= 2024–25 SPHL season =

- League: SPHL
- Sport: Ice hockey
- Duration: October 18, 2024 – April 5, 2025

Regular season
- William B. Coffey Trophy: Peoria Rivermen
- Season MVP: Jordan Ernst
- Top scorer: Nick Ford (Hockey) - Roanoke Rail Yard Dawgs

Playoffs
- Finals champions: Evansville Thunderbolts
- Finals runners-up: Knoxville Ice Bears
- Playoffs MVP: Cole Ceci

SPHL seasons
- ← 2023–24 2025–26 →

The 2024–25 SPHL season is the 21st season of the SPHL. The regular season began on October 18, 2024, and ended on April 5, 2025.

== League business ==
The same 10 teams from the 2023–24 season returned.

== Teams ==
2024-25 Southern Professional Hockey League
Team	City	Arena
Birmingham Bulls	Pelham, Alabama	Pelham Civic Center
Evansville Thunderbolts	Evansville, Indiana	Ford Center
Fayetteville Marksmen	Fayetteville, North Carolina	Crown Complex
Huntsville Havoc	Huntsville, Alabama	Von Braun Center
Knoxville Ice Bears	Knoxville, Tennessee	Knoxville Civic Coliseum
Macon Mayhem	Macon, Georgia	Macon Coliseum
Pensacola Ice Flyers	Pensacola, Florida	Pensacola Bay Center
Peoria Rivermen	Peoria, Illinois	Carver Arena
Quad City Storm	Moline, Illinois	Vibrant Arena at The MARK
Roanoke Rail Yard Dawgs	Roanoke, Virginia	Berglund Center

== Regular season ==
=== Standings ===
As of April 6, 2025.

Team	GP	W	L	OTL	SOL	Pts	GF	GA
z– Peoria Rivermen	56	40	10	3	3	86	216	122
x– Huntsville Havoc	56	36	15	4	1	77	196	144
x– Roanoke Rail Yard Dawgs	56	34	17	2	3	73	199	160
x– Birmingham Bulls	56	32	19	4	1	69	177	163
x– Fayetteville Marksmen	56	30	19	5	2	67	164	182
x– Knoxville Ice Bears	56	25	24	4	2	57	152	186
x– Evansville Thunderbolts	56	24	24	2	6	56	199	172
x– Quad City Storm	56	24	27	2	2	53	161	189
e– Macon Mayhem	56	20	31	5	0	45	136	179
e– Pensacola Ice Flyers	56	15	28	5	8	43	139	192

z– indicates team has clinched William B. Coffey Trophy (regular season champion) and a playoff spot
x– indicates team has clinched a playoff spot
e– indicates team has been eliminated from playoff contention

=== Attendance ===
Team	Total	Games	Average
Huntsville	174,927	28	6,247
Pensacola	152,702	28	5,454
Roanoke	153,230	28	5,473
Peoria	123,173	28	4,399
Fayetteville	119,854	28	4,281
Knoxville	116,006	28	4,143
Quad City	106,594	28	3,807
Birmingham	97,015	28	3,465
Evansville	94,362	28	3,370
Macon	62,702	28	2,239
League	1,200,565	280	4,288

as of April 6, 2025

=== Playoff bracket ===
Quarterfinals
1	Peoria	2
8	Quad City	0
2	Huntsville	1
7	Evansville	2
(Pairings are reseeded after the first round)
3	Roanoke	1
6	Knoxville	2
4	Birmingham	2
5	Fayetteville	0

Semifinals
1	Peoria	0
7	Evansville	2
4	Birmingham	1
6	Knoxville	2

President's Cup Final
6	Knoxville	0
7	Evansville	2

As of April 24, 2025
