= 2025–26 SPHL season =

- League: SPHL
- Sport: Ice hockey
- Duration: October 17, 2025 – May 9, 2026

Regular season
- William B. Coffey Trophy: Peoria Rivermen
- Season MVP: Joe Widmar

Playoffs
- Finals champions: Evansville Thunderbolts
- Finals runners-up: Peoria Rivermen
- Playoffs MVP: Matthew Hobbs

SPHL seasons
- ← 2024–25 2026–27 →

The 2025–26 SPHL season is the 22nd season of the SPHL. The regular season began on October 17, 2025.

== League changes ==
=== Coaching changes ===
Old Coach	New Coach	Team
Rod Aldoff (interim)	Jeremy Gates	Pensacola Ice Flyers

== Regular season ==
=== Standings ===
Team	GP	W	L	OTL	SOL	Pts	GF	GA
z– Peoria Rivermen	58	38	17	3	0	79	159	111
x– Huntsville Havoc	58	32	20	5	1	70	179	146
x– Roanoke Rail Yard Dawgs	58	32	21	3	2	69	176	157
x– Evansville Thunderbolts	58	31	20	1	6	69	146	134
x– Pensacola Ice Flyers	58	28	21	6	3	65	161	172
x– Birmingham Bulls	58	28	23	2	5	63	167	172
x– Knoxville Ice Bears	58	27	26	2	3	59	147	167
x– Macon Mayhem	58	26	26	3	3	58	135	157
e– Quad City Storm	58	25	28	4	1	55	151	177
e– Fayetteville Marksmen	58	23	28	5	2	53	141	169

z– indicates team has clinched William B. Coffey Trophy (regular season champion) and a playoff spot
x– indicates team has clinched a playoff spot
e– indicates team has been eliminated from playoff contention

=== Playoff bracket ===
Quarterfinals
1	Peoria	2
8	Macon	0
2	Huntsville	0
7	Knoxville	2
(Pairings are reseeded after the first round)
3	Roanoke	2
6	Birmingham	0
4	Evansville	2
5	Pensacola	1

Semifinals
1	Peoria	3
7	Knoxville	2
3	Roanoke	1
4	Evansville	3

President's Cup Final
1	Peoria	2
4	Evansville	3
