= 2023–24 SPHL season =

- League: SPHL
- Sport: Ice hockey
- Duration: October 20, 2023 – April 6, 2024

Regular season
- William B. Coffey Trophy: Birmingham Bulls
- Season MVP: Carson Rose (Birmingham)
- Top scorer: Carson Rose (Birmingham)

Playoffs
- Finals champions: Peoria Rivermen
- Finals runners-up: Huntsville Havoc
- Playoffs MVP: Alec Hagaman (Peoria)

SPHL seasons
- ← 2022–23 2024–25 →

The 2023–24 SPHL season is the 20th season of the SPHL. The regular season began on October 20, 2023, and ended on April 6, 2024.

== League business ==
The same 10 teams from the 2023–24 season returned after Vermillion County folded midseason last year.

== Teams ==
2023-24 Southern Professional Hockey League
Team	City	Arena
Birmingham Bulls	Pelham, Alabama	Pelham Civic Center
Evansville Thunderbolts	Evansville, Indiana	Ford Center
Fayetteville Marksmen	Fayetteville, North Carolina	Crown Complex
Huntsville Havoc	Huntsville, Alabama	Von Braun Center
Knoxville Ice Bears	Knoxville, Tennessee	Knoxville Civic Coliseum
Macon Mayhem	Macon, Georgia	Macon Coliseum
Pensacola Ice Flyers	Pensacola, Florida	Pensacola Bay Center
Peoria Rivermen	Peoria, Illinois	Carver Arena
Quad City Storm	Moline, Illinois	Vibrant Arena at The MARK
Roanoke Rail Yard Dawgs	Roanoke, Virginia	Berglund Center

== Map of teams ==
SPHL teams

== Regular season ==
=== Standings ===
As of April 6, 2024.

Team	GP	W	L	OTL	SOL	Pts	GF	GA
z– Birmingham Bulls	56	38	9	6	3	85	198	132
x–Peoria Rivermen	56	37	14	2	4	79	192	139
x–Roanoke Rail Yard Dawgs	56	33	15	7	1	74	207	164
x–Fayetteville Marksmen	56	31	19	6	0	68	191	165
x–Huntsville Havoc	56	30	19	6	1	67	184	166
x–Quad City Storm	56	32	23	1	0	65	193	176
x–Pensacola Ice Flyers	56	25	27	2	2	54	170	178
x–Evansville Thunderbolts	56	23	29	2	2	50	149	177
e–Macon Mayhem	56	15	34	3	4	37	141	225
e–Knoxville Ice Bears	56	16	36	3	1	36	128	231

z– indicates team has clinched William B. Coffey Trophy (regular season champion) and a playoff spot
x– indicates team has clinched a playoff spot
e– indicates team has been eliminated from playoff contention

=== Attendance ===
Team	Total	Games	Average
Huntsville	166,871	28	5,960
Roanoke	148,597	28	5,307
Pensacola	148,588	28	5,307
Fayetteville	113,402	28	4,050
Knoxville	112,562	28	4,020
Peoria	111,224	28	3,972
Quad City	103,672	28	3,703
Birmingham	93,610	28	3,343
Evansville	91,471	28	3,267
Macon	59,413	28	2,122
League	1,149,410	280	4,105

=== Statistical leaders ===
==== Leading skaters ====
The following players are sorted by points, then goals. Updated as of April 6, 2024.

GP = Games played; G = Goals; A = Assists; Pts = Points; PIM = Penalty minutes

Player	Team	GP	G	A	Pts	+/–	PIM
Carson Rose	Birmingham Bulls	49	30	35	65	+26	44
Drake Glover	Birmingham Bulls	55	33	27	60	+33	44
Leif Mattson	Quad City Storm	45	28	31	59	+7	11
Nikita Kozyrev	Birmingham Bulls	53	18	41	59	+31	33
Simon Boyko	Fayetteville Marksmen	39	27	29	56	+20	9
Joe Widmar	Pensacola Ice Flyers	49	16	39	55	-1	18
Cole Golka	Quad City Storm	55	32	21	53	+15	55
Matt Ustaski	Quad City Storm	35	27	26	53	+12	16
Alec Baer	Peoria Rivermen	52	21	31	52	+3	78
Ivan Bondarenko	Pensacola Ice Flyers	53	15	36	51	−2	12

==== Leading goaltenders ====
The following goaltenders with a minimum 1,320 minutes played lead the league in goals against average. Updated as of April 6, 2024.

GP = Games played; TOI = Time on ice (in minutes); SA = Shots against; GA = Goals against; SO = Shutouts; GAA = Goals against average; SV% = Save percentage; W = Wins; L = Losses; OT = Overtime/shootout loss

Player	Team	GP	TOI	SA	GA	SO	GAA	SV%	W	L	OT
Nick Latinovich	Peoria Rivermen	39	2211	848	71	7	1.93	.916	27	7	3
Hayden Stewart	Birmingham Bulls	39	2324	1,111	71	4	2.14	.925	26	7	6
Ryan Kenny	Fayetteville Marksmen	32	1918	1,067	76	2	2.38	.929	18	10	4
Stephen Mundinger	Pensacola Ice Flyers	37	2,051	957	87	3	2.55	.909	16	15	2
Brian Wilson	Huntsville Havoc	32	1940	918	85	2	2.63	.907	16	10	6

== Postseason ==
For 2024, the format was the same as 2023.

=== Playoff bracket ===
Quarterfinals
1	Birmingham	1
8	Evansville	2
2	Peoria	2
7	Pensacola	0
(Pairings are reseeded after the first round)
3	Roanoke	2
6	Quad City	1
4	Fayetteville	0
5	Huntsville	2

Semifinals
2	Peoria	2
8	Evansville	0
3	Roanoke	1
5	Huntsville	2

President's Cup Final
2	Peoria	2
5	Huntsville	1

=== Quarterfinals ===
==== (1) Birmingham Bulls vs. (8) Evansville Thunderbolts ====
April 10, 2024	Evansville Thunderbolts	4 - 5	Birmingham Bulls	Pelham Civic Center	Recap
3:49 – Dmitri Yushkevich (1); 17:16 – Myles Abbate (1)		First period	Scott Donahue (1) – 2:18; Zac Masson (1) – 18:01
No scoring		Second period	Ryan Romeo (1) – 11:05
7:52 – pp – Brendan Harrogate (1); 19:20 – Logan vande Meerakker (1)		Third period	Nikita Kozyrev (1) – 14:59; Drake Glover (1) – pp – 15:31
Cole Ceci (29 saves / 34 shots)		Goalie stats	Hayden Stewart (15 saves / 19 shots)

April 11, 2024	Birmingham Bulls	1 - 2	OT	Evansville Thunderbolts	Ford Center	Recap
3:38 - pp - Drake Glover (2)		First period		no scoring
no scoring		Second period		Mark Zhukov (1) – 4:44
no scoring		Third period		no scoring
No scoring		First overtime period		Chays Ruddy (1) – 10:21
Hayden Stewart (30 saves / 32 shots)		Goalie stats		Cole Ceci (34 saves / 35 shots)

April 13, 2024	Evansville Thunderbolts	4 - 3	OT	Birmingham Bulls	Pelham Civic Center	Recap
0:42 – Logan vande Meerakker (2)		First period		Drake Glover (3) – pp – 7:04
18:10 – Vadim Vasjonkin (1)		Second period		No scoring
15:32 – Dmitri Yushkevich (2)		Third period		Matt Wiesner (1) - 6:13; Drake Glover (4) – 16:29
5:28 – Matthew Hobbs (1)		First overtime period		No scoring
Cole Ceci (56 saves / 59 shots)		Goalie stats		Hayden Stewart (31 saves / 35 shots)

Evansville won series 2-1

==== (2) Peoria Rivermen vs. (7) Pensacola Ice Flyers ====
April 11, 2024	Peoria Rivermen	3 - 2	OT	Pensacola Ice Flyers	Pensacola Bay Center	Recap
2:58 - Jordan Ernst (1); 14:33 - Tristan Trudel (1)		First period		Dale Deon (1) – 14:06
No scoring		Second period		Ivan Bondarenko (1) – 2:16
No scoring		Third period		No scoring
18:50 - Cayden Cahill (1)		First overtime period		No scoring
Nick Latinovich (45 saves / 47 shots)		Goalie stats		Stephen Mundinger (41 saves / 44 shots)

April 13, 2024	Pensacola Ice Flyers	1 - 6	Peoria Rivermen	Carver Arena	Recap
No scoring		First period	Alec Hagaman (1) - 5:31
5:15 – Malik Johnson (1)		Second period	Mathew Rehding (1) – 12:36; Meirs Moore (1) – 19:31
No scoring		Third period	Mike Gelatt (1) – 2:21; Jordan Ernst (2) – pp – 8:52; JM Piotrowski (1) – pp – 10:17
Nick Latinovich (15 saves / 16 shots)		Goalie stats	Stephen Mundinger (25 saves / 31 shots)

Peoria won series 2–0

==== (3) Roanoke Rail Yard Dawgs vs. (6) Quad City Storm ====
April 9, 2024	Roanoke Rail Yard Dawgs	2 - 3	OT	Quad City Storm	Vibrant Arena at The MARK	Recap
6:36 - Dominiks Marcinkevics (1); 11:59 - pp - Brenden Stanko (1)		First period		No scoring
No scoring		Second period		Logan Nelson (1) - 15:30
No scoring		Third period		Leif Mattson (1) – 15:02
No scoring		First overtime period		Hayden Hulton (1) – 2:53
Austyn Roudebush (32 saves / 35 shots)		Goalie stats		Brent Moran (38 saves / 40 shots)

April 12, 2024	Quad City Storm	2 - 3	Roanoke Rail Yard Dawgs	Berglund Center	Recap
2:22 - Mike Moran		First period	Brendan Pepe (1) - pp - 14:29
4:19 – Weiland Parrish (1)		Second period	No scoring
No scoring		Third period	Stephen Alvo (1) – pp – 14:25; Alex DiCarlo (1) – 14:56
Austyn Roudebush (28 saves / 30 shots)		Goalie stats	Brent Moran (24 saves / 27 shots)

April 13, 2024	Quad City Storm	1 - 7	Roanoke Rail Yard Dawgs	Berglund Center	Recap
No scoring		First period	Owen McDade (1) – 5:09; Alex DiCarlo (2) – 12:39
3:45 - pp – Logan Nelson (2)		Second period	Brendan Pepe (2) - pp – 11:54
No scoring		Third period	CJ Stubbs (1) - 1:01; Brendan Pepe (3) - pp – 6:58; Billy Roche (1) – en – 15:48; CJ Stubbs (2) – 16:43
Austyn Roudebush (30 saves / 31 shots)		Goalie stats	Brent Moran (23 saves / 29 shots); Eric Levine (7 saves / 8 shots)

Roanoke won series 2-1

==== (4) Fayetteville Marksmen vs. (5) Huntsville Havoc ====
April 10, 2024	Fayetteville Marksmen	1 - 3	Huntsville Havoc	Huntsville Ice Sports Complex	Recap
No scoring		First period	No scoring
11:34 - pp – Grant Loven (1)		Second period	Dylan Stewart (1) - pp – 0:44; Buster Larsson (1) – 17:37
No scoring		Third period	Robbie Fisher (1) – en - 18:29
Ryan Kenny (40 saves / 42 shots)		Goalie stats	Mike Robinson (25 saves / 26 shots)

April 12, 2024	Huntsville Havoc	7 - 2	Fayetteville Marksmen	Crown Coliseum	Recap
3:14 – Buster Larsson (2)		First period	Todd Goehring (1) - 0:55
8:07 – Eric Henderson (1); 18:14 – sh – Jack Jaunich (1)		Second period	Matt O'Dea (1) - pp - 3:48; Billy Vizzo (1) - 15:57
8:48 – sh – Robbie Fisher (2); 9:43 – sh – Robbie Fisher (3); 14:37 – Craig McCabe (1); 18:51 – en,sh – Craig McCabe (2)		Third period	Simon Boyko (1) - pp – 7:50
Ryan Kenny (18 saves / 24 shots)		Goalie stats	Mike Robinson (29 saves / 31 shots)

Huntsville won series 2–0

=== Semifinals ===
==== (2) Peoria Rivermen vs. (8) Evansville Thunderbolts ====
April 17, 2024	Peoria Rivermen	7 - 2	Evansville Thunderbolts	Ford Center	Recap
7:32 - Jordan Ernst (3)		First period	No scoring
1:41 - Cale List (1); 18:03 - Tristan Trudel (2); 19:33 – pp – Mitchell McPherson (1)		Second period	No scoring
10:47 - pp – Alec Hagaman (2); 12:23 – Alec Hagaman (3); 19:37 – pp – Jordan Ernst (4)		Third period	Chays Ruddy (2) – pp - 7:37; Lincoln Hatten (1) – pp – 15:48
Nick Latinovich (20 saves / 22 shots)		Goalie stats	Cole Ceci (28 saves / 35 shots)

April 19, 2024	Evansville Thunderbolts	2 - 5	Peoria Rivermen	Peoria Civic Center	Recap
No scoring		First period	Alec Baer (1) - 17:39
17:55 – Scott Kirton		Second period	No scoring
8:00 – Lincoln Hatten (2)		Third period	Joseph Drapluk (1) - 14:25; JM Piotrowski (2) – 14:51; Zach Wilkie (1) – pp – 15:43; Mike Gelatt (2) – en – 17:36
Cole Ceci (30 saves / 34 shots)		Goalie stats	Nick Latinovich (16 saves / 18 shots)

Peoria won series 2–0

==== (3) Roanoke Rail Yard Dawgs vs. (5) Huntsville Havoc ====
April 17, 2024	Roanoke Rail Yard Dawgs	2 - 5	Huntsville Havoc	Huntsville Ice Sports Complex	Recap
No scoring		First period	No scoring
No scoring		Second period	Doug Elgstam (1) - 13:38; Buster Larsson (3) – pp – 14:22
9:47 – pp – Jacob Kelly (1); 17:24 – Tommy Munichiello (1)		Third period	Buster Larsson (4) – 2:31; Buster Larsson (5) – 5:08; Buster Larsson (6) – 12:40
Austyn Roudebush (26 saves / 31 shots); Tyler Roy (4 saves / 4 shots)		Goalie stats	Mike Robinson (31 saves / 33 shots)

April 19, 2024	Huntsville Havoc	4 - 5	Roanoke Rail Yard Dawgs	Berglund Center	Recap
No scoring		First period	Jacob Kelly (2) - 1:50; Jacob Kelly (3) - 3:24; Owen McDade (2) - 12:19
18:17 - Buster Larsson (7)		Second period	Aidan Girduckis (1) - 3:37; Josh Nenadal (1) - 4:05
4:17 - pp – Kyle Clarke (1); 5:37 – sh – Matt Doran (1); 19:24 – Robbie Fisher (4)		Third period	No scoring
Austyn Roudebush (36 saves / 40 shots)		Goalie stats	Mike Robinson (8 saves / 12 shots); Brian Wilson (18 saves / 19 shots)

April 20, 2024	Huntsville Havoc	3 - 1	Roanoke Rail Yard Dawgs	Berglund Center	Recap
No scoring		First period	Dominiks Marcinkevics (2) – 13:49
4:25 - Benito Posa (1)		Second period	No scoring
8:06 – Dylan Stewart (2); 18:54 - en - Brett Humberstone (1)		Third period	Alec Baer (3) - pp - 0:20; Nick Neville (1) - 15:37
Austyn Roudebush (24 saves / 26 shots)		Goalie stats	Mike Robinson (25 saves / 26 shots)

Huntsville won series 2-1

=== President's Cup Final ===
==== (2) Peoria Rivermen vs. (5) Huntsville Havoc ====
April 25, 2024	Peoria Rivermen	2 - 3	Huntsville Havoc	Von Braun Center	Recap
8:02 - pp - Alec Baer (2)		First period	David Thomson (1) - 5:45
14:34 – Tristan Trudel (3)		Second period	No scoring
No scoring		Third period	David Thomson (2) - pp – 11:03; Robbie Fisher (5) – 16:13
Nick Latinovich (33 saves / 36 shots)		Goalie stats	Mike Robinson (29 saves / 31 shots)

April 27, 2024	Huntsville Havoc	4 - 6	Peoria Rivermen	Peoria Civic Center	Recap
19:56 - pp - Eric Henderson (2)		First period	Mathew Rehding (2) - pp - 4:32; Alec Hagaman (4) - 13:30; Zach Wilkie (2) - 14:38
11:36 - Jack Jaunich (2); 14:16 – Cole Reginato (1)		Second period	Alec Hagaman (5) - 0:58
4:38 – Cole Reginato (2)		Third period	Alec Baer (4) – 1:46; Alec Hagaman (6) – en – 18:34
Mike Robinson (21 saves / 26 shots)		Goalie stats	Nick Latinovich (21 saves / 25 shots)

April 28, 2024	Huntsville Havoc	1 - 5	Peoria Rivermen	Peoria Civic Center	Recap
3:49 - Alex Kielczewski (1)		First period	Alec Hagaman (7) – 1:05; Mitchell McPherson (2) – 7:31; Meirs Moore (2) – 12:42
No scoring		Second period	No scoring
No scoring		Third period	Alec Hagaman (8) - en - 17:54; Meirs Moore (3) - en – 19:45
Mike Robinson (20 saves / 23 shots)		Goalie stats	Nick Latinovich (21 saves / 22 shots)

Peoria won series 2-1

=== Statistical leaders ===
==== Skaters ====
The following players are sorted by points, then goals. Updated as of April 28, 2024.

GP = Games played; G = Goals; A = Assists; Pts = Points; PIM = Penalty minutes

Player	Team	GP	G	A	Pts	+/–	PIM
Alec Baer	Peoria Rivermen	7	3	14	17	+7	4
Alec Hagaman	Peoria Rivermen	7	8	6	14	+10	18
Buster Larson	Huntsville Havoc	8	7	3	10	+6	2
Robbie Fisher	Huntsville Havoc	8	5	4	9	+1	0
Scott Kirton	Evansville Thunderbolts	5	1	6	7	-1	6

==== Goaltenders ====
The following goaltenders with a minimum 350 minutes played lead the playoffs in goals against average. Updated as of April 28, 2024.

GP = Games played; TOI = Time on ice (in minutes); SA = Shots against; GA = Goals against; SO = Shutouts; GAA = Goals against average; SV% = Save percentage; W = Wins; L = Losses; OT = Overtime/shootout loss

Player	Team	GP	TOI	SA	GA	SO	GAA	SV%	W	L	OT
Nick Latinovich	Peoria Rivermen	7	438	183	15	9	2.06	.918	6	1	0
Austyn Roudebush	Roanoke Rail Yard Dawgs	9	552	266	20	1	2.18	.925	7	2	0
Austyn Roudebush	Roanoke Rail Yard Dawgs	6	353	193	17	1	2.89	.912	3	2	1

== Awards ==
Award	Recipient(s)
President's Cup	Peoria Rivermen
William B. Coffey Trophy (Best regular-season record)	Birmingham Bulls
Defenseman of the Year	Brendan Pepe (Roanoke)
Rookie of the Year	Simon Boyko (Fayetteville)
Goaltender of the Year	Hayden Stewart (Birmingham)
Coach of the Year	Craig Simchuk (Birmingham)
Most Valuable Player	Carson Rose (Birmingham)
Leading Scorer Award	Carson Rose (Birmingham)

=== All-SPHL selections ===
Position	First Team	Second Team	All-Rookie
G	Hayden Stewart (Birmingham)	Nick Latinovich (Peoria)	Ryan Kenny (Fayetteville)
D	Brendan Pepe (Roanoke); Zach Wilkie (Peoria)	Matt O’Dea (Roanoke); Dillion Fournier (Quad City)	Matthew Araujo (Fayetteville); Matt Doran (Huntsville)
F	Carson Rose (Birmingham); Drake Glover (Birmingham); Leif Mattson (Quad City)	Matt Ustaski (Quad City); Simon Boyko (Fayetteville); Nikita Kozyrev (Birmingham)	Simon Boyko (Fayetteville); Nikita Kozyrev (Birmingham); Alex Laplante (Macon)
