= 2021–22 SPHL season =

- League: Southern Professional Hockey League
- Sport: Ice hockey
- Duration: October 15, 2021 – May 3, 2022
- Number of games: 56
- Number of teams: 11

Regular season
- William B. Coffey Trophy: Knoxville Ice Bears
- Season MVP: Alec Baer (Peoria)
- Top scorer: Alec Baer (Peoria)

Playoffs
- Finals champions: Peoria Rivermen
- Finals runners-up: Roanoke Rail Yard Dawgs
- Playoffs MVP: Jack Berry (Peoria)

SPHL seasons
- ← 2020–21 2022–23 →

The 2021–22 SPHL season was the 18th season of the Southern Professional Hockey League (SPHL). The playoffs concluded on May 3, 2022 with the Peoria Rivermen defeating the Roanoke Rail Yard Dawgs in 4 games in the President's Cup Finals, claiming their first President's Cup.

== League business ==
After playing a shortened 2020–21 season with only five teams, the league returned with all ten clubs from the 2019–20 season and added an expansion team, the Vermilion County Bobcats.

== Teams ==
2021-22 Southern Professional Hockey League
Team	City	Arena
Birmingham Bulls	Pelham, Alabama	Pelham Civic Center
Evansville Thunderbolts	Evansville, Indiana	Ford Center
Fayetteville Marksmen	Fayetteville, North Carolina	Crown Complex
Huntsville Havoc	Huntsville, Alabama	Von Braun Center
Knoxville Ice Bears	Knoxville, Tennessee	Knoxville Civic Coliseum
Macon Mayhem	Macon, Georgia	Macon Coliseum
Pensacola Ice Flyers	Pensacola, Florida	Pensacola Bay Center
Peoria Rivermen	Peoria, Illinois	Carver Arena
Quad City Storm	Moline, Illinois	TaxSlayer Center
Roanoke Rail Yard Dawgs	Roanoke, Virginia	Berglund Center
Vermilion County Bobcats	Danville, Illinois	David S. Palmer Arena

== Map of teams ==
SPHL teams

== Regular season ==
=== Standings ===
As of April 10, 2022.

Team	GP	W	L	OTL	SOL	Pts	GF	GA
z–Knoxville Ice Bears	56	42	10	2	2	88	220	136
x–Huntsville Havoc	56	41	13	1	1	84	194	124
x–Peoria Rivermen	56	38	11	3	4	83	219	126
x–Fayetteville Marksmen	56	40	14	1	1	82	197	140
x–Quad City Storm	56	32	15	5	4	73	191	157
x–Pensacola Ice Flyers	56	31	19	5	1	68	189	164
x–Evansville Thunderbolts	56	28	26	2	0	58	162	155
x–Roanoke Rail Yard Dawgs	56	23	24	4	5	55	176	181
e–Birmingham Bulls	56	18	32	5	1	42	144	198
e–Macon Mayhem	56	10	40	3	3	26	123	250
e–Vermilion County Bobcats	56	5	46	5	0	15	83	267

z– indicates team has clinched William B. Coffey Trophy (regular season champion) and a playoff spot
x– indicates team has clinched a playoff spot
e– indicates team has been eliminated from playoff contention

=== Attendance ===
Team	Total	Games	Average
Huntsville	134,713	28	4,811
Knoxville	102,323	28	3,654
Pensacola	97,647	28	3,487
Roanoke	95,011	28	3,393
Fayetteville	80,640	28	2,880
Peoria	76,657	28	2,738
Birmingham	70,747	28	2,527
Evansville	70,678	28	2,524
Quad City	66,481	28	2,374
Macon	48,002	28	1,714
Vermillion County	41,770	28	1,492
League	884,669	308	2,872

=== Statistical leaders ===
==== Leading skaters ====
The following players are sorted by points, then goals. Updated as of April 10, 2022.

GP = Games played; G = Goals; A = Assists; Pts = Points; PIM = Penalty minutes

Player	Team	GP	G	A	Pts	+/–	PIM
Alec Baer	Peoria Rivermen	53	26	54	80	32	36
Alec Hagaman	Peoria Rivermen	47	28	43	71	40	151
Sy Nutkevitch	Huntsville Havoc	56	25	45	70	9	30
Jacob Barber	Huntsville Havoc	54	29	34	63	17	24
Marcel Godbout	Peoria Rivermen	50	33	28	61	15	22
Mac Jansen	Roanoke Rail Yard Dawgs	55	29	31	60	3	52
Rob Darrar	Huntsville Havoc	56	27	33	60	35	16
Anthony McVeigh	Knoxville Ice Bears	56	21	38	59	23	24
Dean Balsamo	Knoxville Ice Bears	46	27	31	58	5	37
Weiland Parrish	Pensacola Ice Flyers	50	15	42	57	22	22

==== Leading goaltenders ====
The following goaltenders with a minimum 660 minutes played lead the league in goals against average. Updated as of April 10, 2022.

GP = Games played; TOI = Time on ice (in minutes); SA = Shots against; GA = Goals against; SO = Shutouts; GAA = Goals against average; SV% = Save percentage; W = Wins; L = Losses; OT = Overtime/shootout loss

Player	Team	GP	TOI	SA	GA	SO	GAA	SV%	W	L	OT
Hunter Vorva	Huntsville Havoc	32	1,892	928	61	3	1.93	.934	22	8	2
Eric Levine	Peoria Rivermen	43	2,446	1,161	83	5	2.04	.929	29	8	4
Jason Pawloski	Fayetteville Marksmen	22	1,288	608	46	2	2.14	.924	17	4	1
Kristian Stead	Knoxville Ice Bears	24	1,394	659	51	2	2.20	.923	18	2	1
Brent Moran	Fayetteville Marksmen	21	1,271	710	50	1	2.36	.930	16	4	1

== Postseason ==
For 2022, the format returned to the top eight teams at the end of the regular season qualifying for the playoffs.

=== Playoff bracket ===
Quarterfinals
1	Knoxville	1
8	Roanoke	2
2	Huntsville	2
7	Evansville	0
(Pairings are reseeded after the first round)
3	Peoria	2
6	Pensacola	1
4	Fayetteville	1
5	Quad City	2

Semifinals
2	Huntsville	0
8	Roanoke	2
3	Peoria	2
5	Quad City	1

President's Cup Final
8	Roanoke	1
3	Peoria	3

=== Quarterfinals ===
==== (1) Knoxville Ice Bears vs. (8) Roanoke Rail Yard Dawgs ====
April 13, 2022	Roanoke Rail Yard Dawgs	1 – 4	Knoxville Ice Bears	Knoxville Civic Coliseum	Recap
No scoring		First period	6:21 – Stepan Timofeyev (1)
No scoring		Second period	17:13 – Andrew Bellant (1)
Mac Jansen (1) – 17:34		Third period	8:31 – pp – Dean Balsamo (1); 16:36 – en – Stepan Timofeyev (2)
Sammy Bernard (23 saves / 26 shots)		Goalie stats	Jimmy Poreda (30 saves / 31 shots)

April 16, 2022	Knoxville Ice Bears	1 – 5	Roanoke Rail Yard Dawgs	Berglund Center	Recap
No scoring		First period	3:44 – Nick DeVito (1); 8:45 – Travis Armstrong (1)
No scoring		Second period	3:27 – Gehrett Sargis (1)
Jared Nash (1) – pp – 15:40		Third period	1:45 – sh – Brant Sherwood (1); 6:06 – Gehrett Sargis (2)
Jimmy Poreda (21 saves / 25 shots)		Goalie stats	Sammy Bernard (23 saves / 24 shots)

April 17, 2022	Roanoke Rail Yard Dawgs	3 – 1	Knoxville Ice Bears	Knoxville Civic Coliseum	Recap
Gehrett Sargis (3) – 3:37; Mac Jansen (2) – 4:57		First period	11:26 – pp – Stepan Timofeyev (3)
Nick Ford (1) – 9:46		Second period	No scoring
No scoring		Third period	No scoring
Sammy Bernard (28 saves / 29 shots)		Goalie stats	Jimmy Poreda (2 saves / 4 shots)

Roanoke won series 2–1

==== (2) Huntsville Havoc vs. (7) Evansville Thunderbolts ====
April 14, 2022	Evansville Thunderbolts	3 – 5	Huntsville Havoc	Propst Arena	Recap
Cameron Cook (1) – 1:38		First period	No scoring
No scoring		Second period	17:54 – pp – Nolan Kaiser (1)
Connor Chatham (1) – 1:14; Cameron Cook (2) – 19:23		Third period	7:07 – Jacob Barber (1); 7:42 – Nate Pionk (1); 12:46 – pp – Bauer Neudecker (1); 18:52 – en – Jacob Barber (2)
Chris Janzen (42 saves / 46 shots)		Goalie stats	Hunter Vorva (14 saves / 17 shots)

April 16, 2022	Huntsville Havoc	3 – 2	OT	Evansville Thunderbolts	Swonder Ice Arena	Recap
No scoring		First period		18:18 – Cameron Cook (3)
No scoring		Second period		16:27 – Derek Osik (1)
Rob Darrar (1) – pp – 0:40; Bair Gendunov (1) – 9:22		Third period		No scoring
Bair Gendunov (2) – pp – 15:34		First overtime period		No scoring
Hunter Vorva (28 saves / 30 shots)		Goalie stats		Chris Janzen (27 saves / 30 shots)

Huntsville won series 2–0

==== (3) Peoria Rivermen vs. (6) Pensacola Ice Flyers ====
April 13, 2022	Peoria Rivermen	6 – 3	Pensacola Ice Flyers	Pelham Civic Center (Birmingham)	Recap
Austin Wisely (1) – 9:41; Alec Baer (1) – 14:48		First period	No scoring
Lordanthony Grissom (1) – 10:27; Jordan Ernst (1) – pp – 16:41; Kasey Kulczycki (1) – 17:16		Second period	No scoring
Mike Laidley (1) – 6:41		Third period	1:04 – pp – Frederic Letourneau (1); 2:54 – Weiland Parrish (1); 19:05 – Ivan Bondarenko (1)
Eric Levine (40 saves / 43 shots)		Goalie stats	Cody Karpinski (30 saves / 34 shots)

April 15, 2022	Pensacola Ice Flyers	6 – 4	Peoria Rivermen	Peoria Civic Center	Recap
Brennan Blaszczak (1) – pp – 5:19; Brennan Blaszczak (2) – 17:37		First period	0:22 – Alec Baer (2); 4:29 – Alec Baer (3)
Frederic Letourneau (2) – 19:34		Second period	No scoring
Ivan Bondarenko (1) – pp – 4:15; Rex Moe (1) – pp – 16:05; Brennan Blaszczak (1) – en – 19:14		Third period	5:06 – Alec Baer (4); 10:32 – pp – JM Piotrowski (1)
Cody Karpinski (23 saves / 27 shots)		Goalie stats	Jack Berry (3 saves / 4 shots)

April 16, 2022	Pensacola Ice Flyers	2 – 4	Peoria Rivermen	Peoria Civic Center	Recap
Frederic Letourneau (3) – pp – 10:34		First period	5:12 – Dale Deon (1); 17:20 – pp – Alec Hagaman (1)
No scoring		Second period	19:43 – Austin Wisely (2)
Weiland Parrish (2) – pp – 14:19		Third period	14:28 – Jordan Ernst (2)
Cody Karpinski (35 saves / 39 shots)		Goalie stats	Jack Berry (25 saves / 27 shots)

Peoria won series 2–1

==== (4) Fayetteville Marksmen vs. (5) Quad City Storm ====
April 13, 2022	Fayetteville Marksmen	3 – 2	Quad City Storm	TaxSlayer Center	Recap
Zach Remers (1) – 7:00		First period	10:26 – pp – Ben Duperreault (1)
No scoring		Second period	No scoring
Taylor Best (1) – 0:30; Drake Glover (1) – 16:10		Third period	15:34 – Drake Glover (1)
Brent Moran (38 saves / 40 shots)		Goalie stats	Bailey Brkin (26 saves / 29 shots)

April 15, 2022	Quad City Storm	3 – 1	Fayetteville Marksmen	Crown Coliseum	Recap
No scoring		First period	No scoring
Dillon Fournier (1) – pp – 9:22		Second period	8:01 – pp – Drake Glover (2)
Shane Bennett (1) – 1:45; Logan Nelson (1) – en – 19:31		Third period	No scoring
Bailey Brkin (26 saves / 27 shots)		Goalie stats	Brent Moran (32 saves / 34 shots)

April 16, 2022	Quad City Storm	4 – 2	Fayetteville Marksmen	Crown Coliseum	Recap
Taylor Price (1) – 8:59; Triston Theriot (1) – 16:12		First period	17:13 – Bryan Moore (1)
No scoring		Second period	8:37 – Nick Mangone (1)
Ben Duperreault (2) – 3:13; Ben Duperreault (3) – 11:09		Third period	No scoring
Bailey Brkin (28 saves / 30 shots)		Goalie stats	Brent Moran (32 saves / 36 shots)

Quad City won series 2–1

=== Semifinals ===
==== (2) Huntsville Havoc vs. (8) Roanoke Rail Yard Dawgs ====
April 21, 2022	Huntsville Havoc	3 – 5	Roanoke Rail Yard Dawgs	Berglund Center	Recap
Rob Darrar (2) – pp – 7:59		First period	4:44 – Brant Sherwood (2); 14:56 – pp – Jeff Jones (1)
Jacob Barber (3) – pp – 10:45; Jacob Barber (4) – 15:30		Second period	6:50 – Nick Ford (2); 11:10 – Sean Leonard (1); 14:42 – pp – Jeff Jones (2)
No scoring		Third period	No scoring
Hunter Vorva (26 saves / 31 shots)		Goalie stats	Austyn Roudebush (18 saves / 20 shots)

April 23, 2022	Roanoke Rail Yard Dawgs	2 – 0	Huntsville Havoc	Propst Arena	Recap
No scoring		First period	No scoring
Brady Heppner (1) – 4:20		Second period	No scoring
Nick Ford (3) – 13:03		Third period	No scoring
Austyn Roudebush (36 saves / 36 shots)		Goalie stats	Hunter Vorva (23 saves / 25 shots)

Roanoke won series 2–0

==== (3) Peoria Rivermen vs. (5) Quad City Storm ====
April 20, 2022	Peoria Rivermen	1 – 4	Quad City Storm	TaxSlayer Center	Recap
No scoring		First period	2:01 – Marcus Ortiz (1); 15:25 – Taylor Pryce (2)
Marcel Godbout (1) – 19:34		Second period	5:05 – Taylor Pryce (3)
No scoring		Third period	18:07 – en – Marcus Ortiz (2)
Jack Berry (36 saves / 39 shots)		Goalie stats	Bailey Brkin (35 saves / 36 shots)

April 22, 2022	Quad City Storm	1 – 5	Peoria Rivermen	Peoria Civic Center	Recap
No scoring		First period	15:05 – Marcel Godbout (2)
Connor Fries (1) – 16:01		Second period	0:28 – Zach Wilkie (1); 11:02 – pp – Alec Baer (5)
No scoring		Third period	3:06 – pp – Marcel Godbout (3); 16:01 – en – Lordanthony Grissom (2)
Bailey Brkin (26 saves / 30 shots)		Goalie stats	Jack Berry (29 saves / 30 shots)

April 23, 2022	Quad City Storm	2 – 3	Peoria Rivermen	Peoria Civic Center	Recap
No scoring		First period	8:51 – Marcel Godbout (4)
Connor Fries (1) – 8:42		Second period	No scoring
Tommy Tsicos (1) – 12:30		Third period	4:43 – JM Piotrowski (2); 15:06 – pp – Jordan Ernst (3)
Bailey Brkin (18 saves / 21 shots)		Goalie stats	Jack Berry (28 saves / 30 shots)

Peoria won series 2–1

=== President's Cup Final ===
==== (3) Peoria Rivermen vs. (8) Roanoke Rail Yard Dawgs ====
April 28, 2022	Roanoke Rail Yard Dawgs	2 – 3	Peoria Rivermen	Peoria Civic Center	Recap
Travis Armstrong (2) – 13:38		First period	No scoring
Gehrett Sargis (4) – 4:11		Second period	12:29 – pp – Mitchell McPherson (1); 17:24 – pp – Mike Laidley (2)
No scoring		Third period	6:47 – Lordanthony Grissom (3)
Sammy Bernard (21 saves / 24 shots)		Goalie stats	Jack Berry (34 saves / 36 shots)

April 29, 2022	Roanoke Rail Yard Dawgs	3 – 7	Peoria Rivermen	Peoria Civic Center	Recap
Nick Ford (4) – pp – 8:31		First period	2:30 – Jordan Ernst (4); 6:24 – Alec Baer (6); 7:20 – Kasey Kulczycki (2); 11:37 – Jordan Ernst (5); 12:13 – Marcel Godbout (5)
Brady Heppner (2) – pp – 12:29		Second period	10:12 – Alec Hagaman (2)
Travis Broughman (1) – 16:54		Third period	19:10 – pp – Jordan Ernst (6)
Austyn Roudebush (19 saves / 23 shots)		Goalie stats	Jack Berry (34 saves / 36 shots)

May 2, 2022	Peoria Rivermen	3 – 4	Roanoke Rail Yard Dawgs	Berglund Center	Recap
No scoring		First period	No scoring
Alec Hagaman (3) – pp – 1:13; Kasey Kulczycki (3) – 14:12; JM Piotrowski (3) – 19:20		Second period	6:37 – Nick Ford (5); 11:03 – Nick Ford (6); 12:22 – Nick Ford (7)
No scoring		Third period	10:06 – Brant Sherwood (3)
Jack Berry (32 saves / 36 shots)		Goalie stats	Sammy Bernard (22 saves / 25 shots)

May 3, 2022	Peoria Rivermen	3 – 2	OT	Roanoke Rail Yard Dawgs	Berglund Center	Recap
No scoring		First period		2:19 – Mac Jansen (3)
Mike Gurtler (1) – 6:10		Second period		1:56 – pp – Travis Broughman (2)
Marcel Godbout (6) – pp – 12:23		Third period		No scoring
JM Piotrowski (4) – 1:06		First overtime period		No scoring
Jack Berry (31 saves / 33 shots)		Goalie stats		Sammy Bernard (22 saves / 25 shots)

Peoria won series 3–1

=== Statistical leaders ===
==== Skaters ====
The following players are sorted by points, then goals. Updated as of May 3, 2022.

GP = Games played; G = Goals; A = Assists; Pts = Points; PIM = Penalty minutes

Player	Team	GP	G	A	Pts	+/–	PIM
Nick Ford	Roanoke Rail Yard Dawgs	9	7	5	12	10	4
Marcel Godbout	Peoria Rivermen	10	6	6	12	10	10
Alec Baer	Peoria Rivermen	10	6	5	11	3	6
JM Piotrowski	Peoria Rivermen	10	4	7	11	4	4
Mac Jansen	Roanoke Rail Yard Dawgs	9	3	7	10	5	0
Alec Hagaman	Peoria Rivermen	10	3	7	10	0	12

==== Goaltenders ====
The following goaltenders with a minimum 350 minutes played lead the playoffs in goals against average. Updated as of May 3, 2022.

GP = Games played; TOI = Time on ice (in minutes); SA = Shots against; GA = Goals against; SO = Shutouts; GAA = Goals against average; SV% = Save percentage; W = Wins; L = Losses; OT = Overtime/shootout loss

Player	Team	GP	TOI	SA	GA	SO	GAA	SV%	W	L	OT
Bailey Brkin	Quad City Storm	6	357	173	14	0	2.25	.919	3	3	0
Jack Berry	Peoria Rivermen	9	492	263	20	0	2.44	.924	6	3	0
Sammy Bernard	Roanoke Rail Yard Dawgs	8	386	167	18	0	2.80	.892	0	0	0

== Awards ==
Award	Recipient(s)
President's Cup	Peoria Rivermen
William B. Coffey Trophy (Best regular-season record)	Knoxville Ice Bears
Defenseman of the Year	Jason Price (Knoxville)
Rookie of the Year	Marcel Godbout (Peoria)
Goaltender of the Year	Hunter Vorva (Huntsville)
Coach of the Year	Jeff Carr (Knoxville)
Most Valuable Player	Alec Baer (Peoria)
Leading Scorer Award	Alec Baer (Peoria)

=== All-SPHL selections ===
Position	First Team	Second Team	All-Rookie
G	Hunter Vorva (Huntsville)	Eric Levine (Peoria)	Kristian Stead (Knoxville)
D	Jason Price (Knoxville); Donald Olivieri (Fayetteville)	Joe Sova (Quad City); Dylan Carabia (Pensacola)	Dylan Carabia (Pensacola); Zach Wilkie (Peoria)
F	Alec Baer (Peoria); Alec Hagaman (Peoria); Sy Nutkevitch (Huntsville); Jacob Barber (Huntsville)	Mac Jansen (Roanoke); Marcel Godbout (Peoria); Anthony McVeigh (Knoxville)	Marcel Godbout (Peoria); Taylor Best (Fayetteville); Weiland Parrish (Pensacola); Carson Rose (Birmingham)

== Milestones and records ==
- On January 22, 2022 – The Pensacola Ice Flyers defeat the Macon Mayhem 13–4 (record for most goals by one team)
