= Evansville Thunderbolts =

- City: Evansville, Indiana
- League: SPHL
- Founded: 2016
- Home arena: Ford Center
- Colors: Red, blue, gray, white
- Owners: VW Sports, LLC.
- Head coach: Jeff Bes
- Captain: Jordan Simoneau
- Website: evansvillethunderbolts.com

Franchise history
- 2016–present: Evansville Thunderbolts

Championships
- Playoff championships: 2 (2024-25, 2025-2026)

The Evansville Thunderbolts are a minor league ice hockey team in the SPHL. The team plays at the Ford Center in Evansville, Indiana. The team replaced the Evansville IceMen of the ECHL.

== History ==
During the 2015–16 season, the City of Evansville and the owner of the ECHL's Evansville IceMen, Ron Geary, were unable to agree to a new lease for the IceMen to continue to operate out of the Ford Center. On January 19, 2016, Geary announced that he had agreed to terms with the nearby city of Owensboro, Kentucky to relocate the team to the Owensboro Sports Center.

On February 8, 2016, Evansville mayor Lloyd Winnecke announced that Mike Hall, a local businessman and IceMen season ticket holder, had secured an expansion team in the Southern Professional Hockey League (SPHL) to play at the Ford Center beginning in the 2016–17 season, thus displacing the IceMen franchise from Evansville. On March 1, the City of Evansville and the new team signed a five-year lease agreement to play at the Ford Center. Hall would act as general manager, while the majority owner was VW Sports, LLC, a subsidiary of VenuWorks, Inc., the arena management company.

On March 22, 2016, former IceMen head coach Jeff Pyle was announced as the head coach for its inaugural season. The new team name was announced on April 15, 2016, taken from the P-47 Thunderbolt fighter aircraft which was manufactured in Evansville during the Second World War. Near the end of the first season, Mike Hall sold his portion of the team to VW Sports, LLC. and Pete Xander was named the new general manager for the 2017–18 season.

After two seasons, head coach Pyle left for the head coaching position with the Atlanta Gladiators of the ECHL. Pyle was replaced by former NHL player Ian Moran as head coach and Adam Stio was named general manager for the 2018–19 season. The team finished in last place and general manager Stio was fired at the end of the season and Moran resigned. Longtime SPHL head coach Jeff Bes was hired as the head coach for the 2019–20 season, while Patrick Kelly was hired as the new general manager. The 2019–20 SPHL season was curtailed by the onset of the COVID-19 pandemic while the Thunderbolts were in a position to qualify for the playoffs.

Due to the ongoing effects and restrictions during the pandemic, the Thunderbolts were one of five SPHL teams to not participate in the 2020–21 season. Before returning for the 2021–22 season, the Thunderbolts hired Bob McNamara as the general manager. The Thunderbolts advanced for the first time in team history to the semifinals in the 2023–24 playoffs, beating the Birmingham Bulls in a sudden death overtime playoff game with the game-winning goal scored by Captain Matthew Hobbs, assisted by Myles Abbate. At the conclusion of the 2024–25 regular season the Thunderbolts finished with a 24–24–2–6 record clinching the 7th seed in the President's Cup. On April 24, 2025, the Thunderbolts won The President's Cup, their 1st in franchise history following a 2–1 overtime win over the Knoxville Ice Bears. The game winning overtime goal was scored by Aiden Litke, assisted by Ethan Price and Captain Matthew Hobbs. Goalie Cole Ceci was named Playoffs MVP.

The 25-26 regular season was the Thunderbolts' best to date. Finishing tied for 3rd Evansville clinched home ice advantage for the first round of the playoffs. They defeated the Pensacola Ice Flyers 2 games to 1 with a game 3 overtime winner, the Roanoke Rail Yard Dawgs 3 games to 1 in round 2, and reverse swept the Peoria Rivermen 3 games to 2 in the Finals to clinch back to back President Cup titles. Team captain Matthew Hobbs was named playoffs MVP.

== Season-by-season records ==
Overview of Evansville Thunderbolts seasons
Season	GP	W	L	OTL	Pts	GF	GA	Finish	Playoffs
2016–17	56	14	32	10	38	138	206	10th of 10, SPHL	did not qualify
2017–18	56	27	20	9	63	186	191	6th of 10, SPHL	Lost Quarterfinals, 2-1 (Macon)
2018–19	56	12	38	6	30	124	224	10th of 10, SPHL	did not qualify
2019–20	46	25	14	7	57	153	151	5th of 10, SPHL	Season cancelled
2020–21	did not participate								
2021–22	56	28	26	2	58	162	155	7th of 11, SPHL	Lost Quarterfinals, 2-0 (Huntsville)
2022–23	56	32	22	2	66	172	165	5th of 11, SPHL	Lost Quarterfinals, 2-0 (Roanoke)
2023-24	56	23	29	4	50	149	177	8th of 10, SPHL	Won Quarterfinals, 2-1 (Birmingham) Lost Semifinals, 2-0 (Peoria)
2024-25	56	24	24	8	56	149	172	7th of 10, SPHL	Won Quarterfinals, 2–1 (Huntsville) Won Semifinals, 2–0 (Peoria) Won Finals, 2–0 (Knoxville)
2025-26	58	31	21	7	69	146	134	3rd of 10 (tied), SPHL	Won Quarterfinals, 2-1 (Pensacola Ice Flyers) Won Semifinals, 3-1 ( Roanoke) Won Finals, 3-2 ( Peoria)

== See also ==
- Sports in Evansville
