= 2022–23 SPHL season =

- League: Southern Professional Hockey League
- Sport: Ice hockey
- Duration: October 20, 2022 – April 8, 2023
- Games: 56
- Teams: 11

Regular season
- William B. Coffey Trophy: Peoria Rivermen
- Season MVP: Justin MacDonald (Knoxville)
- Top scorer: Justin MacDonald (Knoxville)

Playoffs
- Finals champions: Roanoke Rail Yard Dawgs
- Finals runners-up: Birmingham Bulls
- Playoffs MVP: Austyn Roudebush (Roanoke)

SPHL seasons
- ← 2021–22 2023–24 →

The 2022–23 SPHL season was the 19th season of the Southern Professional Hockey League (SPHL). The Peoria Rivermen won their fifth William B. Coffey Trophy during the regular season, while the Roanoke Rail Yard Dawgs earned their first President's Cup, defeating the Birmingham Bulls in four games.

== League business ==
The same 11 teams from the 2021–22 season returned. The Vermilion County Bobcats officially ceased operations on February 9, 2023.

== Teams ==
2022-23 Southern Professional Hockey League
Team	City	Arena
Birmingham Bulls	Pelham, Alabama	Pelham Civic Center
Evansville Thunderbolts	Evansville, Indiana	Ford Center
Fayetteville Marksmen	Fayetteville, North Carolina	Crown Complex
Huntsville Havoc	Huntsville, Alabama	Von Braun Center
Knoxville Ice Bears	Knoxville, Tennessee	Knoxville Civic Coliseum
Macon Mayhem	Macon, Georgia	Macon Coliseum
Pensacola Ice Flyers	Pensacola, Florida	Pensacola Bay Center
Peoria Rivermen	Peoria, Illinois	Carver Arena
Quad City Storm	Moline, Illinois	Vibrant Arena at The MARK
Roanoke Rail Yard Dawgs	Roanoke, Virginia	Berglund Center
Vermilion County Bobcats	Danville, Illinois	David S. Palmer Arena

== Map of teams ==
SPHL teams

== Regular season ==
=== Standings ===
As of April 8, 2023.

Team	GP	W	L	OTL	SOL	Pts	GF	GA
z–Peoria Rivermen	57	39	14	3	1	82	217	137
x–Birmingham Bulls	57	37	16	2	2	78	217	162
x–Huntsville Havoc	56	34	19	2	1	71	197	162
x–Roanoke Rail Yard Dawgs	56	32	19	3	2	69	185	161
x–Evansville Thunderbolts	56	32	22	2	0	66	172	165
x–Knoxville Ice Bears	57	32	22	1	2	67	221	199
x–Fayetteville Marksmen	56	26	22	8	0	60	155	166
x–Pensacola Ice Flyers	57	26	25	3	3	58	183	190
e–Quad City Storm	57	23	32	1	1	48	136	183
e–Macon Mayhem	57	13	39	4	1	31	166	257
e–Vermilion County Bobcats	30	4	24	2	0	10	59	126

z– indicates team has clinched William B. Coffey Trophy (regular season champion) and a playoff spot
x– indicates team has clinched a playoff spot
e– indicates team has been eliminated from playoff contention

=== Attendance ===
Team	Total	Games	Average
Huntsville	154,362	28	5,513
Pensacola	130,024	28	4,644
Roanoke	124,569	28	4,449
Knoxville	119,522	28	4,269
Fayetteville	96,608	28	3,450
Peoria	91,930	28	3,283
Quad City	87,318	28	3,119
Evansville	87,052	28	3,109
Birmingham	80,812	28	2,886
Macon	44,999	28	1,607
Vermillion County	9,635	18	535
League	1,026,831	298	3,446

=== Statistical leaders ===
==== Leading skaters ====
The following players are sorted by points, then goals. Updated as of April 10, 2023.

GP = Games played; G = Goals; A = Assists; Pts = Points; PIM = Penalty minutes

Player	Team	GP	G	A	Pts	+/–	PIM
Justin MacDonald	Knoxville Ice Bears	46	34	45	79	+6	44
Garrett Milan	Pensacola Ice Flyers	57	26	43	69	−12	83
Dean Balsamo	Knoxville Ice Bears	49	27	39	66	−7	16
Sy Nutkevitch	Huntsville Havoc	56	18	45	63	+10	16
Alec Hagaman	Peoria Rivermen	53	24	37	61	+20	202
Tyler Piacentini	Huntsville Havoc	56	22	39	61	+12	26
Michael Gillespie	Birmingham Bulls	38	27	33	60	+24	18
Rob Darrar	Huntsville Havoc	55	23	33	56	+4	31
Nick Ford	Roanoke Rail Yard Dawgs	56	16	38	54	−2	76
Ivan Bondarenko	Pensacola Ice Flyers	57	15	39	54	−3	15

==== Leading goaltenders ====
The following goaltenders with a minimum 1,320 minutes played lead the league in goals against average. Updated as of April 10, 2023.

GP = Games played; TOI = Time on ice (in minutes); SA = Shots against; GA = Goals against; SO = Shutouts; GAA = Goals against average; SV% = Save percentage; W = Wins; L = Losses; OT = Overtime/shootout loss

Player	Team	GP	TOI	SA	GA	SO	GAA	SV%	W	L	OT
Trevor Gorsuch	Evansville Thunderbolts	23	1,352	793	51	2	2.26	.936	15	8	0
Eric Levine	Peoria Rivermen	34	1,771	804	68	5	2.30	.915	17	8	4
Austyn Roudebush	Roanoke Rail Yard Dawgs	42	2,313	1,036	97	2	2.52	.906	24	12	4
Kevin Resop	Quad City Storm	40	2,145	1,139	96	3	2.69	.916	14	22	1
Austin Lotz	Birmingham Bulls	33	1,979	985	90	1	2.73	.909	24	7	2

== Postseason ==
For 2023, the format returned to the top eight teams at the end of the regular season qualifying for the playoffs.

=== Playoff bracket ===
Quarterfinals
1	Peoria	2
8	Pensacola	0
2	Birmingham	2
7	Fayetteville	1
(Pairings are reseeded after the first round)
3	Huntsville	2
6	Knoxville	0
4	Roanoke	2
5	Evansville	0

Semifinals
1	Peoria	1
4	Roanoke	2
2	Birmingham	2
3	Huntsville	1

President's Cup Final
2	Birmingham	1
4	Roanoke	3

=== Quarterfinals ===
==== (1) Peoria Rivermen vs. (8) Pensacola Ice Flyers ====
April 13, 2023	Peoria Rivermen	3 - 2	Pensacola Ice Flyers	Pensacola Bay Center	Recap
11:13 - Joseph Widmar (1); 18:21 - pp - Alec Baer (1)		First period	No scoring
No scoring		Second period	No scoring
16:00 - Alec Hagaman (1)		Third period	Garrett Milan (1) - pp - 10:09; Jason Price (1) - 15:49
Jack Berry (23 saves / 25 shots)		Goalie stats	Brad Arvanitis (31 saves / 34 shots)

April 15, 2023	Pensacola Ice Flyers	1 - 2	Peoria Rivermen	Carver Arena	Recap
No scoring		First period	Alec Hagaman (2) - 11:11
18:04 - Malik Johnson (1)		Second period	Jordan Ernst (1) - 19:12
No scoring		Third period	No scoring
Brad Arvanitis (27 saves / 29 shots)		Goalie stats	Jack Berry (18 saves / 19 shots)

Peoria won series 2–0

==== (2) Birmingham Bulls vs. (7) Fayetteville Marksmen ====
April 13, 2023	Birmingham Bulls	2 - 3	OT	Fayetteville Marksmen	Crown Coliseum	Recap
No scoring		First period		No scoring
No scoring		Second period		No scoring
11:16 - Scott Donahue (1); 17:36 - pp - Michael Gillespie (1)		Third period		Matt McNair (1) - 9:59; Matt McNair (2) - pp - 10:59
No scoring		First overtime period		2:37 - Carson Vance (1)
Austin Lotz (16 saves / 19 shots)		Goalie stats		Jason Pawloski (24 saves / 26 shots)

April 15, 2023	Fayetteville Marksmen	2 - 4	Birmingham Bulls	Pelham Civic Center	Recap
13:32 - pp - Austin Alger (1)		First period	Ryan Romeo (1) - 10:25
16:36 - pp - Andrew Lane (1)		Second period	Carson Rose (1) - pp - 0:50; Mike Davis (1) - pp - 11:41
no scoring		Third period	Stefan Brucato (1) - 18:50
Jason Pawloski (24 saves / 27 shots)		Goalie stats	Hayden Stewart (27 saves / 29 shots)

April 16, 2023	Fayetteville Marksmen	0 - 2	Birmingham Bulls	Pelham Civic Center	Recap
No scoring		First period	No scoring
No scoring		Second period	Jake Pappalardo (1) - 15:51
No scoring		Third period	Jake Pappalardo (2) - 15:12
Jason Pawloski (28 saves / 30 shots)		Goalie stats	Hayden Stewart (30 saves / 30 shots)

Birmingham won series 2-1

==== (3) Huntsville Havoc vs. (6) Knoxville Ice Bears ====
April 13, 2023	Knoxville Ice Bears	1 - 5	Huntsville Havoc	Huntsville Ice Sports Complex	Recap
6:59 - Robbie Fisher (1)		First period	Dean Balsamo (1) - pp - 3:39
No scoring		Second period	Austin Martinsen (1) - pp - 8:10; Austin Martinsen (2) - sh - 10:25; Sam Hunter (1) - 13:31; Mason Palmer (1) - 19:23
No scoring		Third period	No scoring
Kristian Stead (37 saves / 42 shots)		Goalie stats	Max Milosek (20 saves / 21 shots)

April 14, 2023	Huntsville Havoc	3 - 2	Knoxville Ice Bears	Knoxville Civic Coliseum	Recap
2:21 - Rob Darrar (1)		First period	No scoring
No scoring		Second period	Tanner Salsberry (1) - 12:38; Rasmuz Waxin-Engback (1) - 17:25
6:51 - Austin Martinsen (3); 14:27 - Robbie Fisher (2)		Third period	No scoring
Max Milosek (25 saves / 27 shots)		Goalie stats	Kristian Stead (15 saves / 18 shots)

Huntsville won series 2-0

==== (4) Roanoke Rail Yard Dawgs vs. (5) Evansville Thunderbolts ====
April 13, 2023	Roanoke Rail Yard Dawgs	4 - 2	Evansville Thunderbolts	Ford Center	Recap
19:56 - Gehrett Sargis (1)		First period	No scoring
3:55 - Gehrett Sargis (2); 14:57 - [[C.J. Stubbs] (ice hockey)|C.J. Stubbs]] (1)		Second period	Pierre-Luc Lurette (1) - 12:56
17:25 - Jordan Xavier (1)		Third period	Matt Dorsey (1) - 13:46
Austyn Roudebush (21 saves / 23 shots)		Goalie stats	Lucas Fitzpatrick (23 saves / 27 shots)

April 15, 2023	Evansville Thunderbolts	0 - 4	Roanoke Rail Yard Dawgs	Berglund Center	Recap
No scoring		First period	Gehrett Sargis (3) - 17:39
No scoring		Second period	Matt O'Dea (1) - pp - 3:48; Billy Vizzo (1) - 15:57
No scoring		Third period	Alex DiCarlo (1) - 10:02
Lucas Fitzpatrick (28 saves / 32 shots); Zane Steeves (7 saves / 7 shots)		Goalie stats	Austyn Roudebush (32 saves / 32 shots)

Roanoke won series 2–0

=== Semifinals ===
==== (1) Peoria Rivermen vs. (4) Roanoke Rail Yard Dawgs ====
April 19, 2023	Peoria Rivermen	2 - 3	Roanoke Rail Yard Dawgs	Berglund Center	Recap
7:32 - sh - Alec Hagaman (3); 14:05 - pp - Marcel Godbout (1)		First period	Nick Ford (1) - pp - 14:05
No scoring		Second period	Jason Lavallee (1) - pp - 9:48; Josh Nenadal (1) - 11:29
No scoring		Third period	No scoring
Jack Berry (19 saves / 22 shots)		Goalie stats	Austyn Roudebush (32 saves / 34 shots)

April 21, 2023	Roanoke Rail Yard Dawgs	3 - 5	Peoria Rivermen	Peoria Civic Center	Recap
8:43 - sh - Nick DeVito (1)		First period	Mitchell McPherson (1) - pp - 7:18; Mike Gelatt (1) - 7:49; Marcel Godbout (2) - 18:52
3:53 - Nick DeVito (2)		Second period	Alec Baer (2) - pp - 3:30; Jordan Ernst (2) - 11:34
0:17 - Nick DeVito (3)		Third period	No scoring
Austyn Roudebush (28 saves / 32 shots)		Goalie stats	Jack Berry (21 saves / 24 shots)

April 23, 2023	Roanoke Rail Yard Dawgs	5 - 3	Peoria Rivermen	Peoria Civic Center	Recap
0:15 - Josh Nenadal (2); 12:39 - Gehrett Sargis (4); 15:39 - Gehrett Sargis (5)		First period	No scoring
14:35 - Nick DeVito (4)		Second period	Austin Wisely (1) - 14:11
19:34 - en - Nick DeVito (5)		Third period	Alec Baer (3) - pp - 0:20; Nick Neville (1) - 15:37
Austyn Roudebush (37 saves / 40 shots)		Goalie stats	Jack Berry (9 saves / 12 shots); Eric Levine (7 saves / 8 shots)

Roanoke won series 2-1

==== (2) Birmingham Bulls vs. (3) Huntsville Havoc ====
April 21, 2023	Huntsville Havoc	2 - 3	OT	Birmingham Bulls	Pelham Civic Center	Recap
19:20 - Rob Darrar (2)		First period		No scoring
13:01 - Jacob Barber (1)		Second period		Carson Rose (2) - 5:58
No scoring		Third period		Jake Pappalardo (3) - 10:27
No scoring		First overtime period		Carson Rose (3) - 2:21
Max Milosek (42 saves / 45 shots)		Goalie stats		Austin Lotz (14 saves / 16 shots)

April 22, 2023	Birmingham Bulls	2 - 3	OT	Huntsville Havoc	Propst Arena	Recap
No scoring		First period		Sy Nutkevitch (1) - pp - 11:56
0:30 - Zac Masson (1); 8:08 - Scott Donahue (2)		Second period		No scoring
No scoring		Third period		Jordan Fader (1) - 10:43
No scoring		First overtime period		Jamie Bucell (1) - 12:29
Austin Lotz (29 saves / 32 shots)		Goalie stats		Max Milosek (26 saves / 28 shots)

April 23, 2023	Huntsville Havoc	2 - 5	Birmingham Bulls	Pelham Civic Center	Recap
No scoring		First period	No scoring
12:40 - Austin Martinsen (1); 16:44 - pp - Kyle Clarke (1)		Second period	Michael Gillespie (2) - pp - 5:02; Taylor Brierley (1) - 11:05
No scoring		Third period	Stefan Brucato (2) - 8:08; Michael Gillespie (3) - en - 17:35; Scott Donahue - en - 18:32
Max Milosek (30 saves / 33 shots)		Goalie stats	Austin Lotz (29 saves / 31 shots)

Birmingham won series 2-1

=== President's Cup Final ===
==== (2) Birmingham Bulls vs. (4) Roanoke Rail Yard Dawgs ====
April 27, 2023	Roanoke Rail Yard Dawgs	4 - 2	Birmingham Bulls	Pelham Civic Center	Recap
4:32 - Stephen Alvo (1)		First period	Jake Pappalardo (4) - 0:29
6:10 - pp - Jason Lavallee (1)		Second period	Scott Donahue (4) - pp - 1:23
2:57 - Nick Ford (2); 5:16 - Matt O'Dea (1)		Third period	No scoring
Austyn Roudebush (25 saves / 27 shots)		Goalie stats	Hayden Stewart (19 saves / 23 shots)

April 28, 2023	Roanoke Rail Yard Dawgs	0 - 2	Birmingham Bulls	Pelham Civic Center	Recap
No scoring		First period	Matt Wiesner (1) - 8:47
No scoring		Second period	No scoring
No scoring		Third period	Artur Terchiyev (1) - 2:08
Austyn Roudebush (26 saves / 28 shots)		Goalie stats	Austin Lotz (33 saves / 33 shots)

May 1, 2023	Birmingham Bulls	4 - 5	OT	Roanoke Rail Yard Dawgs	Berglund Center	Recap
9:22 - Carson Rose (4); 17:54 - Zac Masson (2)		First period		John Stampohar (1) - 10:45; Nick Ford (3) - 17:16
No scoring		Second period		C.J. Stubbs (2) - pp - 2:26
1:27 - Jake Pappalardo (5); 14:23 - sh - Carson Rose (5)		Third period		Nick DeVito (6) - 4:55
No scoring		First overtime period		Billy Vizzo (2) - 11:53
Austin Lotz (35 saves / 40 shots)		Goalie stats		Austyn Roudebush (27 saves / 31 shots)

May 2, 2023	Birmingham Bulls	1 - 2	OT	Roanoke Rail Yard Dawgs	Berglund Center	Recap
No scoring		First period		No scoring
No scoring		Second period		Josh Nenadal (3) - 14:11
19:49 - Carson Rose (6)		Third period		No scoring
No scoring		First overtime period		Mac Jansen (1) - 2:41
Hayden Stewart (33 saves / 35 shots)		Goalie stats		Austyn Roudebush (18 saves / 19 shots)

Roanoke won series 3-1

=== Statistical leaders ===
==== Skaters ====
The following players are sorted by points, then goals. Updated as of May 2, 2023.

GP = Games played; G = Goals; A = Assists; Pts = Points; PIM = Penalty minutes

Player	Team	GP	G	A	Pts	+/–	PIM
Nick DeVito	Roanoke Rail Yard Dawgs	9	6	5	11	4	4
Nick Ford	Roanoke Rail Yard Dawgs	9	3	7	10	6	8
Carson Rose	Birmingham Bulls	10	6	3	9	0	8
Jake Pappalardo	Birmingham Bulls	9	5	4	9	4	8
Stephen Alvo	Roanoke Rail Yard Dawgs	8	1	8	9	7	19

==== Goaltenders ====
The following goaltenders with a minimum 350 minutes played lead the playoffs in goals against average. Updated as of May 2, 2023.

GP = Games played; TOI = Time on ice (in minutes); SA = Shots against; GA = Goals against; SO = Shutouts; GAA = Goals against average; SV% = Save percentage; W = Wins; L = Losses; OT = Overtime/shootout loss

Player	Team	GP	TOI	SA	GA	SO	GAA	SV%	W	L	OT
Austyn Roudebush	Roanoke Rail Yard Dawgs	9	552	266	20	1	2.18	.925	7	2	0
Austin Lotz	Birmingham Bulls	6	388	172	15	1	2.32	.913	3	0	3

== Awards ==
Award	Recipient(s)
President's Cup	Roanoke Rail Yard Dawgs
William B. Coffey Trophy (Best regular-season record)	Peoria Rivermen
Defenseman of the Year	Zach Wilkie (Peoria)
Rookie of the Year	Austin Alger (Fayetteville)
Goaltender of the Year	Trevor Gorsuch (Evansville)
Coach of the Year	Craig Simchuk (Birmingham)
Most Valuable Player	Justin MacDonald (Knoxville)
Leading Scorer Award	Justin MacDonald (Knoxville)

=== All-SPHL selections ===
Position	First Team	Second Team	All-Rookie
G	Trevor Gorsuch (Evansville)	Kevin Resop (Quad City)	Nick Latinovich (Macon)
D	Zach Wilkie (Peoria); Rourke Russell (Knoxville) (tie); Nick Neville (Peoria) (tie)	Taylor Brierley (Birmingham); Dominic Procopio (Huntsville)	Rourke Russell (Knoxville); Taylor Brierley (Birmingham)
F	Justin MacDonald (Knoxville); Michael Gillespie (Birmingham); Garrett Milan (Pensacola)	Alec Hagaman (Peoria); Dean Balsamo (Knoxville); Sy Nutkevitch (Huntsville)	Austin Alger (Fayetteville); Brandon Harrogate (Evansville); Kolten Olynek (Pensacola)
