= 2017–18 SPHL season =

- League: Southern Professional Hockey League
- Sport: Ice hockey
- Duration: October 20, 2017–April 9, 2018
- Games: 56
- Teams: 10

Regular Season
- William B. Coffey Trophy: Peoria Rivermen
- Season MVP: Berkley Scott (Knoxville)
- Top scorer: Berkley Scott (Knoxville)

Playoffs
- Finals champions: Huntsville Havoc
- Finals runners-up: Peoria Rivermen
- Playoffs MVP: Sy Nutkevitch (Huntsville)

SPHL seasons
- ← 2016–17 2018–19 →

The 2017–18 SPHL season was the 14th season of the Southern Professional Hockey League (SPHL).

== League business ==
=== Team changes ===
- The Birmingham Bulls from Pelham, Alabama, join the SPHL as an expansion team on April 26, 2017.
- The Columbus Cottonmouths suspended operations on May 3, 2017, because the franchise was unable to find a new owner in time for scheduling the 2017–18 season.
- The Fayetteville FireAntz were sold and rebranded as the Fayetteville Marksmen.

== Teams ==
2017-18 Southern Professional Hockey League
Team	City	Arena
Birmingham Bulls	Pelham, Alabama	Pelham Civic Center
Evansville Thunderbolts	Evansville, Indiana	Ford Center
Fayetteville Marksmen	Fayetteville, North Carolina	Crown Complex
Huntsville Havoc	Huntsville, Alabama	Von Braun Center
Knoxville Ice Bears	Knoxville, Tennessee	Knoxville Civic Coliseum
Macon Mayhem	Macon, Georgia	Macon Coliseum
Mississippi RiverKings	Southaven, Mississippi	Landers Center
Pensacola Ice Flyers	Pensacola, Florida	Pensacola Bay Center
Peoria Rivermen	Peoria, Illinois	Carver Arena
Roanoke Rail Yard Dawgs	Roanoke, Virginia	Berglund Center

== Map of teams ==
SPHL teams

== Regular season ==
=== Standings ===
Final standings.

Team	GP	W	L	OTL	GF	GA	Pts
Peoria Rivermen‡	56	38	13	5	211	154	81
Macon Mayhem	56	33	16	7	214	174	73
Pensacola Ice Flyers	56	33	16	7	189	156	73
Huntsville Havoc	56	30	16	10	203	180	70
Knoxville Ice Bears	56	30	20	6	205	182	66
Evansville Thunderbolts	56	27	20	9	186	191	63
Mississippi RiverKings	56	29	25	2	193	181	60
Roanoke Rail Yard Dawgs	56	26	26	4	170	195	56
Birmingham Bulls	56	22	28	6	159	199	50
Fayetteville Marksmen	56	12	38	6	144	262	30

^{‡} William B. Coffey Trophy winners
Advanced to playoffs

=== Attendance ===
Team	Total	Games	Average
Huntsville	133,672	28	4,774
Peoria	107,983	28	3,856
Knoxville	107,087	28	3,824
Pensacola	103,465	28	3,695
Roanoke	94,107	28	3,360
Fayetteville	83,699	28	2,989
Birmingham	73,442	28	2,622
Macon	66,943	28	2,390
Mississippi	65,093	28	2,324
Evansville	64,673	28	2,309
League	900,164	280	3,214

== President's Cup playoffs ==
For 2018, the top eight teams at the end of the regular season qualified for the playoffs. The league implemented a new format so that the top three seeds chose their opponent from the bottom four qualifiers, calling it the "challenge round". The second round still had the highest versus lowest remaining seed format.

=== Playoff bracket ===
Challenge Round
1	Peoria	2
8	Roanoke	0
2	Macon	2
6	Evansville	1
(Pairings are reseeded after the first round)
3	Pensacola	0
5	Knoxville	2
4	Huntsville	2
7	Mississippi	1

Second Round
1	Peoria	2
5	Knoxville	0
2	Macon	1
4	Huntsville	2

Championships
1	Peoria	1
4	Huntsville	2

=== Finals ===
Home team is listed first.

April 25	Peoria Rivermen	5 – 6	Huntsville Havoc	Carver Arena	Recap

April 27	Huntsville Havoc	2 – 3	Peoria Rivermen	Von Braun Center	Recap

April 29	Peoria Rivermen	2 – 4	Huntsville Havoc	Carver Arena	Recap

Huntsville won series 2–1

== Awards ==
Award	Recipient(s)	Finalists
President's Cup	Huntsville Havoc	Peoria Rivermen
William B. Coffey Trophy (Best regular-season record)	Peoria Rivermen	
Defenseman of the Year	Dave Pszenyczny (Peoria)	Daniel Gentzler (Macon); Stuart Stefan (Hunstville)
Rookie of the Year	Jacob Barber (Birmingham)	Eliot Grauer (Knoxville); Tomas Sholl (Evansville)
Goaltender of the Year	Brad Barone (Roanoke)	Tomas Sholl (Evansville)
Coach of the Year	Jean-Guy Trudel (Peoria)	Jeff Bes (Pensacola); Kevin Kerr (Macon)
Most Valuable Player	Berkley Scott (Knoxville)	Jake Trask (Macon)
Kevin Swider Leading Scorer Award	Berkley Scott (Knoxville)	Jake Trask (Macon)

=== All-SPHL selections ===
Position	First Team	Second Team	All-Rookie
G	Brad Barone (Roanoke)	Tomas Sholl (Evansville)	Tomas Sholl (Evansville)
D	Dave Pszenyczny (Peoria); Stuart Stefan (Huntsville)	David Brancik (Knoxville); Daniel Gentzler (Macon)	Anthony Calabrese (Huntsville) (tie); Michael Chen (Knoxville); Derek Perl (Huntsville) (tie)
F	Alec Hagaman (Peoria); Berkley Scott (Knoxville); Jake Trask (Macon)	Jake Hauswirth (Fayetteville); Steve Mele (Roanoke); Garrett Milan (Pensacola)	Jacob Barber (Birmingham); Eliot Grauer (Knoxville); Joseph Widmar (Peoria)
