= 2018–19 SPHL season =

- League: Southern Professional Hockey League
- Sport: Ice hockey
- Duration: October 2018–April 2019
- Games: 56
- Teams: 10

Regular season
- William B. Coffey Trophy: Peoria Rivermen
- Season MVP: Josh Harris (Birmingham)
- Top scorer: Ryan Salked (Huntsville) & Ben Blasko (Peoria)

Playoffs
- Finals champions: Huntsville Havoc
- Finals runners-up: Birmingham Bulls
- Playoffs MVP: Max Milosek (Huntsville)

SPHL seasons
- ← 2017–18 2019–20 →

The 2018–19 SPHL season is the 15th season of the Southern Professional Hockey League (SPHL).

== League business ==
After eleven seasons, president Jim Combs left the league to pursue other opportunities. He originally joined the league in the 2007–08 season and had been league president since 2010–11. Combs was replaced by Doug Price on January 17, 2019.

=== Team changes ===
- The Quad City Storm from Moline, Illinois, joined the SPHL by acquiring the dormant Louisiana IceGators franchise. The Storm replaced the folded Quad City Mallards of the ECHL in the Quad Cities.
- The Mississippi RiverKings ownership suspended operations while the league seeks to find new ownership.

== Teams ==
2018-19 Southern Professional Hockey League
Team	City	Arena
Birmingham Bulls	Pelham, Alabama	Pelham Civic Center
Evansville Thunderbolts	Evansville, Indiana	Ford Center
Fayetteville Marksmen	Fayetteville, North Carolina	Crown Complex
Huntsville Havoc	Huntsville, Alabama	Von Braun Center
Knoxville Ice Bears	Knoxville, Tennessee	Knoxville Civic Coliseum
Macon Mayhem	Macon, Georgia	Macon Coliseum
Pensacola Ice Flyers	Pensacola, Florida	Pensacola Bay Center
Peoria Rivermen	Peoria, Illinois	Carver Arena
Quad City Storm	Moline, Illinois	TaxSlayer Center
Roanoke Rail Yard Dawgs	Roanoke, Virginia	Berglund Center

== Map of teams ==
SPHL teams

== Regular season ==
=== Standings ===
Final standings:

Team	GP	W	L	OTL	GF	GA	Pts
Peoria Rivermen‡	56	40	7	9	201	123	89
Birmingham Bulls	56	39	15	2	204	147	80
Huntsville Havoc	56	36	17	3	209	152	75
Knoxville Ice Bears	56	29	22	5	169	166	63
Roanoke Rail Yard Dawgs	56	28	24	4	168	177	60
Macon Mayhem	56	27	24	5	160	156	59
Pensacola Ice Flyers	56	26	24	6	143	150	58
Fayetteville Marksmen	56	25	23	8	172	201	58
Quad City Storm	56	18	33	5	143	197	41
Evansville Thunderbolts	56	12	38	6	124	224	30

^{‡} William B. Coffey Trophy winners
Advanced to playoffs

=== Attendance ===
Team	Total	Games	Average
Huntsville	138,106	28	4,932
Knoxville	106,906	28	3,818
Peoria	102,018	28	3,643
Pensacola	100,717	28	3,597
Roanoke	97,950	28	3,498
Quad City	89,064	28	3,180
Birmingham	66,563	28	2,377
Fayetteville	62,075	28	2,216
Evansville	57,151	28	2,041
Macon	56,572	28	2,020
League	877,122	280	3,132

== Statistical leaders ==
=== Scoring leaders ===
The following players are sorted by points, then goals.

GP = Games played; G = Goals; A = Assists; Pts = Points; PIM = Penalty minutes

Player	Team	GP	G	A	Pts	PIM
Ryan Salked	Huntsville Havoc	55	28	37	65	40
Ben Blasko	Peoria Rivermen	55	18	47	65	24
Josh Harris	Birmingham Bulls	55	25	38	63	73
Sy Nutkevitch	Huntsville Havoc	55	12	45	57	33
Kyle Sharkey	Huntsville Havoc	51	17	38	55	32
Jake Trask	Macon Mayhem	51	28	26	54	24
Alec Hagaman	Peoria Rivermen	54	18	36	54	147
John Siemer	Macon Mayhem	56	15	39	54	33
Justin Greenberg	Peoria Rivermen	49	19	34	53	14
Jacob Barber	Birmingham Bulls	56	25	24	49	30

=== Leading goaltenders ===
GP = Games played; TOI = Time on ice (in minutes); SA = Shots against; GA = Goals against; SO = Shutouts; GAA = Goals against average; SV% = Save percentage; W = Wins; L = Losses; OTL = Overtime/shootout loss

Player	Team	GP	TOI	SA	GA	SO	GAA	SV%	W	L	OTL
Stephen Klein	Peoria Rivermen	32	1756	713	56	5	1.91	.921	21	5	3
Storm Phaneuf	Peoria Rivermen	22	1272	430	44	1	2.07	.898	15	2	4
Brian Billett	Pensacola Ice Flyers	38	2139	1021	76	5	2.13	.926	19	11	5
Mavric Parks	Birmingham Bulls	42	2472	1394	94	6	2.28	.933	30	9	2
Max Milosek	Huntsville Havoc	30	1783	870	68	1	2.29	.922	23	6	1

== President's Cup playoffs ==
For 2019, the top eight teams at the end of the regular season qualify for the playoffs. The league kept the format implemented in the previous season where the top three seeds choose their opponent from the bottom four qualifiers, calling it the "challenge round". The second round will still have the highest versus lowest remaining seed format.

=== Playoff bracket ===
Quarterfinals
1	Peoria	0
5	Roanoke	2
2	Birmingham	2
8	Fayetteville	1
(Pairings are reseeded after the first round)
3	Huntsville	2
7	Pensacola	1
4	Knoxville	2
6	Macon	0

Semifinals
2	Birmingham	2
5	Roanoke	1
3	Huntsville	2
4	Knoxville	0

Championships
2	Birmingham	0
3	Huntsville	2

== Quarterfinals ==
=== (1) Peoria Rivermen vs. (5) Roanoke Rail Yard Dawgs ===
April 10	Peoria Rivermen	3–4	Roanoke Rail Yard Dawgs	Berglund Center
No scoring		First period	Mac Jansen (1) – 9:51
13:27 – Ben Oskroba (1); 18:25 – Kevin Patterson (1); 18:39 – Joe Kalisz (1)		Second period	Mac Jansen (2) – 11:51
No scoring		Third period	Colton Wolter (1) – 5:48; Josh Nenadal (1) – 17:22
Storm Phaneuf (20 saves / 24 shots)		Goalie stats	Jacob Caffrey (30 saves / 33 shots)

April 12	Roanoke Rail Yard Dawgs	4–3	Peoria Rivermen	Owens Center
Jordan Carvalho (1) – sh – 10:33; Maxime Guyon (1) – 15:48		First period	No scoring
Cody Dion (1) – 6:41; Maxime Guyon (2) – 8:43		Second period	16:15 – pp – Justin Greenberg (1)
No scoring		Third period	11:47 – Pijus Rulevičius (1); 17:38 – pp – Ralfs Grīnbergs (1)
Jacob Caffrey (41 saves / 44 shots)		Goalie stats	Stephen Klein (7 saves / 10 shots); Storm Phaneuf (10 saves / 11 shots)

Roanoke won series 2–0

=== (2) Birmingham Bulls vs. (8) Fayetteville Marksmen ===
April 12	Birmingham Bulls	0–4	Fayetteville Marksmen	Crown Coliseum
No scoring		First period	Brandon McMartin (1) – 17:09
No scoring		Second period	Cody Brown (1) – 10:27; Taylor McCloy (1) – pp – 13:51
No scoring		Third period	Jake Hauswirth (1) – pp – 19:15
Mavric Parks (28 saves / 32 shots)		Goalie stats	Jason Pawloski (30 saves / 30 shots)

April 13	Fayetteville Marksmen	2–3	Birmingham Bulls	Pelham Civic Center
Sam Wilbur (1) – pp – 19:59		First period	15:35 – pp – Josh Harris (1)
Brian Bowen (1) – 4:45		Second period	13:59 – Taylor Dickin (1)
No scoring		Third period	10:03 – pp – Cole Golka (1)
Jason Pawloski (45 saves / 48 shots)		Goalie stats	Mavric Parks (17 saves / 19 shots)

April 14	Fayetteville Marksmen	0–5	Birmingham Bulls	Pelham Civic Center
No scoring		First period	No scoring
No scoring		Second period	Geoff Crisfield (1) – pp – 1:38; Craig Simchuck (1) – pp – 4:13; Geoff Crisfield (2) – 10:38
No scoring		Third period	Taylor Dickin (2) – 11:37; Shane Topf (1) – en – 18:36
Jason Pawloski (24 saves / 28 shots)		Goalie stats	Mavric Parks (40 saves / 40 shots)

Birmingham won series 2–1

=== (3) Huntsville Havoc vs. (7) Pensacola Ice Flyers ===
April 11	Pensacola Ice Flyers	1–3	Huntsville Havoc	Huntsville IcePlex
No scoring		First period	No scoring
No scoring		Second period	0:27 – sh – Ryan Salked (1)
Andrew Schmit (1) – 1:39		Third period	9:45 – Sy Nutkevitch (1); 11:58 – Christian Powers (1)
Brian Billett (34 saves / 37 shots)		Goalie stats	Max Milosek (41 saves / 42 shots)

April 13	Huntsville Havoc	2–3	OT	Pensacola Ice Flyers	Pensacola Bay Center
19:01 – Rob Darrar (1)		First period		No scoring
No scoring		Second period		Donald Olivieri (1) – pp – 2:41; Joseph Drapluk (1) – 5:56
7:36 – Josh Bowes (1)		Third period		No scoring
No scoring		First overtime period		Tim Moore (1) – 4:23
Max Milosek (48 saves / 51 shots)		Goalie stats		Brian Billett (29 saves / 31 shots)

April 14	Pensacola Ice Flyers	3–4	Huntsville Havoc	Huntsville IcePlex
No scoring		First period	Kyle Sharkey (1) – 10:59; Trevor Gerling (1) – 18:36
4:57 – Joseph Drapluk (2); 13:14 – Ryan Marcuz (1)		Second period	No scoring
18:12 – Joseph Drapluk (3)		Third period	Rob Darrar (2) – 2:19; Peter Sikalis (1) – 4:39
Brian Billett (35 saves / 39 shots)		Goalie stats	Max Milosek (47 saves / 50 shots)

Huntsville won series 2–1

=== (4) Knoxville Ice Bears vs. (6) Macon Mayhem ===
April 10	Macon Mayhem	1–3	Knoxville Ice Bears	Knoxville Civic Coliseum
No scoring		First period	18:03 – pp – Stefan Brucato (1)
No scoring		Second period	No scoring
Derek Sutliffe (1) – pp – 7:23		Third period	3:10 – pp – Stanislav Dzakhov (1); 19:49 – en – Stefan Brucato (2)
Kevin Entmaa (19 saves / 21 shots)		Goalie stats	Hayden Stewart (32 saves / 33 shots)

April 12	Knoxville Ice Bears	3–2	Macon Mayhem	Macon Coliseum
17:39 – sh – Mitchell Mueller (1)		First period	Jake Trask (1) – 8:01
No scoring		Second period	No scoring
13:47 – Mitchell Mueller (2); 18:27 – Chandler Madry (1)		Third period	Derek Sutliffe (2) – 12:05
Hayden Stewart (29 saves / 31 shots)		Goalie stats	Jordan Ruby (19 saves / 22 shots)

Knoxville won series 2–0

== Semifinals ==
=== (2) Birmingham Bulls vs. (5) Roanoke Rail Yard Dawgs ===
April 18	Birmingham Bulls	4–3	Roanoke Rail Yard Dawgs	Berglund Center
3:35 – Shane Topf (2); 9:48 – pp – Garrett Schmitz (1)		First period	Adrian Carbonara (1) – 7:54
11:53 – Mike Davis (1)		Second period	Colin Murray (1) – pp – 6:15; Mac Jansen (3) – 19:56
1:12 – Mike Crocock (1)		Third period	No scoring
Mavric Parks (27 saves / 30 shots)		Goalie stats	Jacob Caffrey (15 saves / 19 shots)

April 19	Roanoke Rail Yard Dawgs	4–1	Birmingham Bulls	Pelham Civic Center
Ben Bauer (1) – pp – 10:31		First period	No scoring
Josh Nenadal (2) – 2:34; Cam Bakker (1) – pp – 10:23		Second period	No scoring
Cam Bakker (2) – en – 18:33		Third period	17:19 – Taylor Dickin (3)
Jacob Caffrey (26 saves / 27 shots)		Goalie stats	Mavric Parks (11 saves / 13 shots); Sebastian Andersson (9 saves / 10 shots)

April 20	Roanoke Rail Yard Dawgs	4–6	Birmingham Bulls	Pelham Civic Center
14:35 – Mac Jansen (4)		First period	Justin Larson (1) – pp – 7:41; Craig Simchuck (2) – 14:03
3:35 – pp – Cody Dion (2); 9:34 – Mac Jansen (5); 11:12 – Cody Dion (3)		Second period	Geoff Crisfield (3) – pp – 12:01; Taylor Dickin (4) – 18:12
No scoring		Third period	Jacob Barber (1) – pp – 3:25; Geoff Crisfield (4) – pp – 13:27
Jacob Caffrey (24 saves / 30 shots)		Goalie stats	Mavric Parks (31 saves / 35 shots)

Birmingham won series 2–1

=== (3) Huntsville Havoc vs. (4) Knoxville Ice Bears ===
April 18	Knoxville Ice Bears	2–3	OT	Huntsville Havoc	Huntsville IcePlex
No scoring		First period		No scoring
Scott Cuthrell (1) – sh – 14:14; Scott Cuthrell (2) – 15:58		Second period		3:26 – pp – Trevor Gerling (2)
No scoring		Third period		5:28 – Tyler Piacentini (1)
No scoring		First overtime period		7:24 – Tyler Piacentini (2)
Hayden Stewart (54 saves / 57 shots)		Goalie stats		Max Milosek (32 saves / 34 shots)

April 20	Huntsville Havoc	3–2	OT	Knoxville Ice Bears	Knoxville Civic Coliseum
9:44 – pp – Connor Schmidt (1)		First period		No scoring
7:14 – pp – Christian Powers (2)		Second period		David Brančík (1) – 7:44
No scoring		Third period		Spencer Metcalfe (1) – pp – 3:09
10:46 – Nolan Kaiser (1)		First overtime period		No scoring
Max Milosek (36 saves / 38 shots)		Goalie stats		Hayden Stewart (29 saves / 32 shots)

Huntsville won series 2–0

== President's Cup Finals ==
=== (2) Birmingham Bulls vs. (3) Huntsville Havoc ===
April 26	Huntsville Havoc	4–3	OT	Birmingham Bulls	Huntsville IcePlex
No scoring		First period		4:49 – Mike Davis (2)
Derek Perl (1) – 1:29; Sy Nutkevitch (2) – 2:47; Tyler Piacentini (3) – sh – 17:40		Second period		No scoring
Jacob Barber (2) – pp – 0:59		Third period		2:29 – Cole Golka (2)
Rob Darrar (3) – 5:44		First overtime period		No scoring
Max Milosek (31 saves / 34 shots)		Goalie stats		Mavric Parks (38 saves / 42 shots)

April 27	Birmingham Bulls	2–4	Huntsville Havoc	Pelham Civic Center
10:34 – pp – Josh Harris (2)		First period	John Schiavo (1) – 15:27
No scoring		Second period	Kyle Sharkey (2) – 8:16
15:47 – Shane Topf (3)		Third period	Kyle Sharkey (3) – pp – 12:58; Christian Powers (3) – en – 19:11
Mavric Parks (37 saves / 40 shots)		Goalie stats	Max Milosek (32 saves / 34 shots)

Huntsville won series 2–0

== Playoff scoring leaders ==
Note: GP = Games played; G = Goals; A = Assists; Pts = Points; PIM = Penalty minutes

Player	Team	GP	G	A	Pts	PIM
Geoff Crisfield	Birmingham Bulls	8	4	6	10	15
Rob Darrar	Huntsville Havoc	7	3	5	8	0
Kyle Sharkey	Huntsville Havoc	7	3	5	8	2
Jacob Barber	Birmingham Bulls	8	2	6	8	4
Mac Jensen	Roanoke Rail Yard Dawgs	5	5	2	7	0
Shane Topf	Birmingham Bulls	8	3	4	7	6
Cam Bakker	Roanoke Rail Yard Dawgs	5	2	5	7	2
Craig Simchuck	Birmingham Bulls	8	2	5	7	8
Trevor Gerling	Huntsville Havoc	7	2	4	6	4
Sy Nutkevitch	Huntsville Havoc	7	2	4	6	4
Cole Golka	Birmingham Bulls	8	2	4	6	2
Ryan Salked	Huntsville Havoc	7	1	5	6	8

== Playoff leading goaltenders ==
GP = Games played; TOI = Time on ice (in minutes); SA = Shots against; GA = Goals against; SO = Shutouts; GAA = Goals against average; SV% = Save percentage; W = Wins; L = Losses; OTL = Overtime loss

Player	Team	GP	TOI	SA	GA	SO	GAA	SV%	W	L	OTL
Hayden Stewart	Knoxville Ice Bears	4	258	153	9	0	2.09	.941	2	0	2
Max Milosek	Huntsville Havoc	7	448	283	16	0	2.14	.943	6	0	1
Jason Pawloski	Fayetteville Marksmen	3	175	106	7	1	2.39	.934	1	2	0
Mavric Parks	Birmingham Bulls	8	451	251	22	1	2.92	.912	4	3	1
Brian Billett	Pensacola Ice Flyers	3	178	107	9	0	2.92	.916	1	2	0

== Awards ==
Award	Recipient(s)	Finalists
President's Cup	Huntsville Havoc	Birmingham Bulls
William B. Coffey Trophy (Best regular-season record)	Peoria Rivermen	
Defenseman of the Year	Travis Jeke (Fayetteville)	Nick Neville (Peoria); Garrett Schmitz (Birmingham)
Rookie of the Year	Ben Blasko (Peoria)	Brian Bowen (Fayetteville); Max Milosek (Huntsville); Garrett Schmitz (Birmingham)
Goaltender of the Year	Mavric Parks (Birmingham)	Brian Billett (Pensacola)
Coach of the Year	Jamey Hicks (Birmingham)	
Most Valuable Player	Josh Harris (Birmingham)	Mavric Parks (Birmingham)
Kevin Swider Leading Scorer Award	Ben Blasko (Peoria)	Josh Harris (Birmingham)

=== All-SPHL selections ===
Position	First Team	Second Team	All-Rookie
G	Mavric Parks (Birmingham)	Brian Billett (Pensacola)	Stephen Klein (Peoria)
D	Travis Jeke (Fayetteville); Garrett Schmitz (Birmingham)	Nick Neville (Peoria); Doug Rose (Knoxville)	Alec Brandrup (Huntsville) tie Doug Rose, (Knoxville) tie Garrett Schmitz, (Birmingham) tie
F	Ben Blasko (Peoria); Josh Harris (Birmingham); Ryan Salkeld (Huntsville)	Justin Greenberg (Peoria) tie Alec Hagaman (Peoria) tie John Siemer (Macon) tie Jake Trask (Macon)	Ben Blasko (Peoria); Scott Cuthrell (Knoxville); Rob Darrar (Huntsville)
