= 2016–17 SPHL season =

- League: Southern Professional Hockey League
- Sport: Ice hockey
- Duration: October 21, 2016–April 8, 2017
- Number of teams: 10

Regular Season
- William B. Coffey Trophy: Macon Mayhem
- Season MVP: Sean Bonar (Fayetteville)
- Top scorer: Tayler Thompson (Fayetteville)

Playoffs
- Finals champions: Macon Mayhem
- Finals runners-up: Peoria Rivermen
- Playoffs MVP: Jordan Ruby (Macon)

SPHL seasons
- ← 2015–16 2017–18 →

The 2016–17 SPHL season was the 13th season of the Southern Professional Hockey League (SPHL).

== League business ==
=== Team changes ===
- The dormant Mississippi Surge franchise was purchased and relocated to Roanoke, Virginia, and became the Roanoke Rail Yard Dawgs.
- The Evansville Thunderbolts from Evansville, Indiana, join the SPHL as an expansion team replacing the former Evansville IceMen of the ECHL.
- The Louisiana IceGators suspended operations because renovations to the Cajundome were not going to be complete in time for the regular season.

== Teams ==
2016-17 Southern Professional Hockey League
Team	City	Arena
Columbus Cottonmouths	Columbus, Georgia	Columbus Civic Center
Evansville Thunderbolts	Evansville, Indiana	Ford Center
Fayetteville FireAntz	Fayetteville, North Carolina	Crown Complex
Huntsville Havoc	Huntsville, Alabama	Von Braun Center
Knoxville Ice Bears	Knoxville, Tennessee	Knoxville Civic Coliseum
Macon Mayhem	Macon, Georgia	Macon Coliseum
Mississippi RiverKings	Southaven, Mississippi	Landers Center
Pensacola Ice Flyers	Pensacola, Florida	Pensacola Bay Center
Peoria Rivermen	Peoria, Illinois	Carver Arena
Roanoke Rail Yard Dawgs	Roanoke, Virginia	Berglund Center

== Map of teams ==
SPHL teams

== Regular season ==
=== Standings ===
Final standings

Team	GP	W	L	OTL	GF	GA	Pts
Macon Mayhem^{‡}	56	37	13	6	178	146	80
Fayetteville FireAntz	56	36	17	3	174	130	75
Peoria Rivermen	56	32	13	11	182	145	75
Huntsville Havoc	56	34	16	6	200	165	74
Mississippi RiverKings	56	32	21	3	172	162	67
Knoxville Ice Bears	56	29	20	7	175	178	65
Pensacola Ice Flyers	56	27	21	8	171	154	62
Columbus Cottonmouths	56	22	30	4	153	199	48
Roanoke Rail Yard Dawgs	56	17	30	9	158	216	43
Evansville Thunderbolts	56	14	32	10	138	206	38

^{‡} William B. Coffey Trophy winners
Advanced to playoffs

=== Attendance ===
Team	Total	Games	Average
Huntsville	130,166	28	4,648
Peoria	112,713	28	4,025
Pensacola	104,631	28	3,736
Knoxville	101,123	28	3,611
Roanoke	87,831	28	3,136
Evansville	63,854	28	2,280
Mississippi	63,276	28	2,259
Columbus	63,220	28	2,257
Macon	52,052	28	1,859
Fayetteville	52,013	28	1,857
League	830,879	280	2,967

== President's Cup playoffs ==
=== Playoff bracket ===
Quarterfinals
1	Macon	2
8	Columbus	1
2	Fayetteville	0
7	Pensacola	2
(Pairings are reseeded after the first round)
3	Peoria	2
6	Knoxville	0
4	Huntsville	2
5	Mississippi	1

Semifinals
1	Macon	2
7	Pensacola	0
3	Peoria	2
4	Huntsville	1

Finals
1	Macon	2
3	Peoria	0

=== Finals ===
Home team is listed first.

April 28	Peoria Rivermen	1–2	Macon Mayhem	Carver Arena	Recap
Michael Colantone – 1:35		First period	No scoring
No scoring		Second period	No scoring
No scoring		Third period	6:27 – John Siemer; 10:49 – PP – Stephen Pierog
Storm Phaneuf 23 shots / 21 saves		Goalie stats	Jordan Ruby 26 shots / 25 saves

April 30	Macon Mayhem	2–1	Peoria Rivermen	Macon Coliseum	Recap
Dennis Sicard – 16:12		First period	No scoring
Jake Trask – 16:11		Second period	1:52 – Cody Dion
No scoring		Third period	No scoring
Jordan Ruby 40 shots / 39 saves		Goalie stats	Storm Phaneuf 34 shots / 32 saves

Macon wins series 2–0

== Awards ==
2016–17 SPHL awards
Award	Recipient(s)	Finalists
President's Cup	Macon Mayhem	Peoria Rivermen
William B. Coffey Trophy (Best regular-season record)	Macon Mayhem	
Defenseman of the Year	Louis Belisle (Pensacola)	Nolan Kaiser (Huntsville); Stuart Stefan (Huntsville)
Rookie of the Year	Mike Moran (Mississippi)	Keegan Bruce (Columbus)
Goaltender of the Year	Sean Bonar (Fayetteville)	Jordan Ruby (Macon)
Coach of the Year	Kevin Kerr (Macon)	Jeff Bes (Fayetteville)
Most Valuable Player	Sean Bonar (Fayetteville)	Tayler Thompson (Fayetteville)
Kevin Swider Leading Scorer Award	Tayler Thompson (Fayetteville)	

=== All-SPHL selections ===
Position	First Team	Second Team	All-Rookie
G	Sean Bonar (Fayetteville)	Jordan Ruby (Macon)	Storm Phaneuf (Peoria)
D	Louis Belisle (Pensacola)	Nick Schneider (Roanoke)	Nathan Bruyere (Pensacola)
D	Nolan Kaiser (Huntsville)	Stuart Stefan (Huntsville)	Daniel Echeverri (Macon)
F	Mike Moran (Mississippi)	Keegan Bruce (Columbus)	Keegan Bruce (Columbus)
F	Sy Nutkevitch (Huntsville)	Bobby Chaumont (Fayetteville)	Mike Moran (Mississippi)
F	Tayler Thompson (Fayetteville)	Jake Hauswirth (Fayetteville)	John Siemer (Macon)
