= Peoria Rivermen =

Peoria Rivermen is the name of four minor league hockey clubs:

- Peoria Rivermen (IHL), named as such 1984–1996, formerly the Peoria Prancers 1982–1984
- Peoria Rivermen (ECHL), 1996–2005
- Peoria Rivermen (AHL), 2005–2013
- Peoria Rivermen (SPHL), 2013–present
