= Brock McGinn =

Canadian ice hockey player (born 1994)

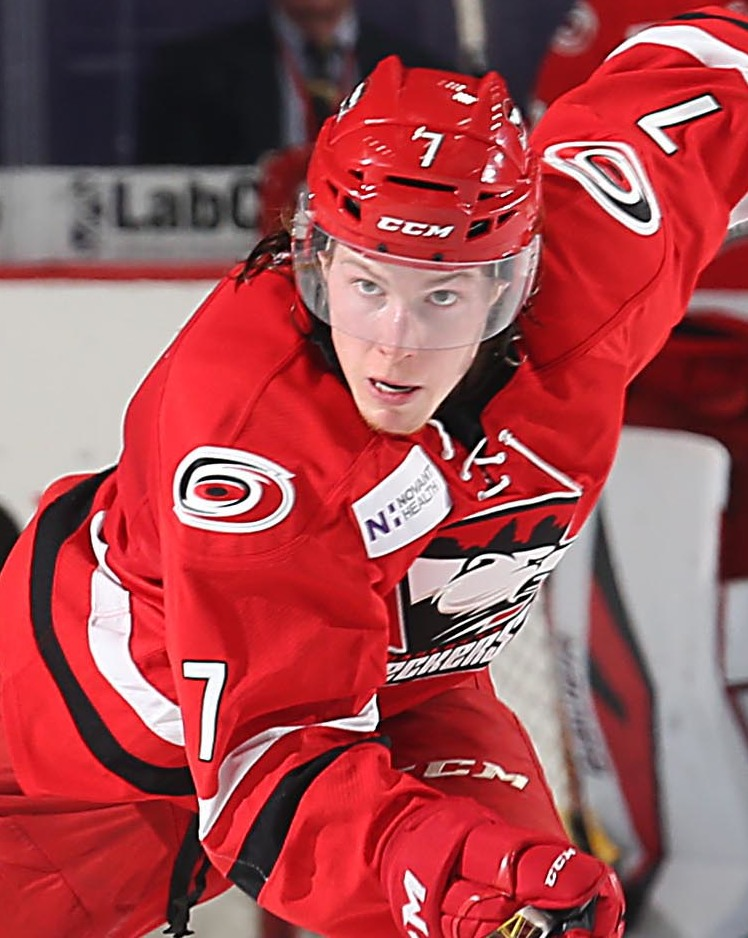
- McGinn with the Charlotte Checkers in 2015
- Born: February 2, 1994 (age 32) Fergus, Ontario, Canada
- Height: 6 ft 0 in (183 cm)
- Weight: 187 lb (85 kg; 13 st 5 lb)
- Position: Left wing
- Shoots: Left
- NHL team Former teams: Free agent Carolina Hurricanes; Pittsburgh Penguins; Anaheim Ducks
- NHL draft: 47th overall, 2012; Carolina Hurricanes
- Playing career: 2013–present

Brock McGinn (born February 2, 1994) is a Canadian professional ice hockey player who is a left winger. He most recently played for the Anaheim Ducks of the National Hockey League (NHL). He was drafted 47th overall by the Carolina Hurricanes in the 2012 NHL entry draft. He previously played for the Hurricanes and the Pittsburgh Penguins.

== Playing career ==
After graduating from minor hockey with the Guelph Jr. Storm of the Ontario Minor Hockey Association (OMHA), McGinn was selected by the Guelph Storm of the Ontario Hockey League (OHL) in the third round, 46th overall in the OHL Priority Selection Draft. He played with the Storm from 2010–11 through 2013–14. At the beginning of the 2011–12 season, McGinn was named an alternate captain. In his final season with the Storm, McGinn established a career high numbers in his junior career in which he tallied 43 goals and 85 points. The Storm won the 2014 J. Ross Robertson Cup as the OHL champions over the North Bay Battalion, with McGinn scoring the Storm's opening goal in the final. The Storm then proceeded to play in the 2014 Memorial Cup tournament, where McGinn scored five points in five games. However, the Storm lost in the final to the Edmonton Oil Kings.

McGinn was selected by the Carolina Hurricanes of the National Hockey League (NHL) in the second round, 47th overall during the 2012 NHL entry draft. On April 3, 2013, the Hurricanes signed McGinn to a three-year, entry-level contract. With the Storm eliminated from the OHL playoffs, McGinn joined the Hurricanes' American Hockey League (AHL) affiliate, the Charlotte Checkers, for the remainder of the 2012–13 AHL season.

In his first full professional season in 2014–15, McGinn recorded 15 goals and 27 points in 73 games for the Checkers. During the 2014–15 season, McGinn was suspended by the AHL for one game for charging on March 3, 2015. After scoring two goals in two games to start the 2015–16 season with the Checkers, McGinn received his first NHL recall and made his debut on October 16, 2015 against the Detroit Red Wings. In his first shift, McGinn scored his first NHL goal to open the scoring after only 55 seconds. It was the fastest debut goal since Alexander Mogilny scored after 20 seconds in 1989. He also contributed with an assist to help the Hurricanes defeat the Red Wings 5–3. He finished the season with four points in 21 games.

McGinn became a regular for the Hurricanes during the 2016–17 season, skating in 57 games, scoring 16 points. He signed a two-year contract extension with the Hurricanes on June 28, 2017. McGinn had his best season during the 2017–18 season where he scored 16 goals and 30 points in 80 games. McGinn finished the 2018–19 season having played in all 82 games, scoring 10 goals and 26 points. In Game 7 of the 2019 Eastern Conference First Round against the Washington Capitals, McGinn made a save with just over two minutes remaining in regulation, and scored the series-winning goal with 8:55 left in double overtime on an assist by Justin Williams. This was the first Hurricanes playoff win since 2009. On July 20, 2019, the Hurricanes re-signed McGinn to a two-year, $4.2 million contract extension.

Upon reaching unrestricted free agency after the 2020–21 season, McGinn joined the Pittsburgh Penguins on July 28, 2021 by signing a four-year, $11 million contract. He scored his first goal as a Penguin on October 16, 2021 in a 5–2 win over the Chicago Blackhawks. On March 11, 2022, McGinn suffered an upper body injury in a game versus the Carolina Hurricanes. He returned to the lineup on April 13 after missing fifteen games. In his second season with the Penguins, McGinn struggled on the third line, going 26 games without a point. This was despite scoring two game-winning goals in back-to-back games in November. On February 28, 2023, Pittsburgh placed McGinn on waivers.

McGinn cleared waivers and on March 3 the Penguins traded him and a third-round draft pick in the 2024 NHL entry draft to the Anaheim Ducks in exchange for defenceman Dmitry Kulikov. McGinn made his Ducks debut on March 7 in a 5–2 loss to the Seattle Kraken. He scored his first goal as a Duck in his second game, a 3–2 overtime loss to the Vancouver Canucks on March 8. On April 6, 2023 McGinn suffered an upper body injury in a 3–1 loss to the Edmonton Oilers that caused him to miss the rest of the season. McGinn suffered a lower body injury during the Ducks' 2023 training camp that led to him being placed on injured reserve at the beginning of the 2023–24 season. He was activated and made his season debut on November 16, 2023 in an 8–2 loss to the Colorado Avalanche.

== Personal life ==
McGinn has two brothers who also play professional hockey, with Brock being the youngest. Jamie (born 1988) was a 2006 second-round pick by the San Jose Sharks who most recently played for the Florida Panthers. Tye (born 1990) was a 2010 fourth-round pick by the Philadelphia Flyers and who most recently played for the Chicago Wolves of the AHL.

Along with his father, Bob McGinn, and his two brothers, he is one of the owners of the Roanoke Rail Yard Dawgs of the Southern Professional Hockey League.

== Career statistics ==
			Regular season					Playoffs
Season	Team	League	GP	G	A	Pts	PIM	GP	G	A	Pts	PIM
2009–10	Orangeville Crushers	CCHL	3	0	0	0	0	—	—	—	—	—
2010–11	Guelph Storm	OHL	68	10	4	14	38	6	0	0	0	2
2011–12	Guelph Storm	OHL	33	12	7	19	25	6	1	1	2	8
2012–13	Guelph Storm	OHL	68	28	26	54	71	3	2	2	4	11
2012–13	Charlotte Checkers	AHL	4	0	0	0	0	2	0	0	0	2
2013–14	Guelph Storm	OHL	58	43	42	85	45	12	6	6	12	21
2014–15	Charlotte Checkers	AHL	73	15	12	27	38	—	—	—	—	—
2015–16	Charlotte Checkers	AHL	48	19	16	35	29	—	—	—	—	—
2015–16	Carolina Hurricanes	NHL	21	3	1	4	10	—	—	—	—	—
2016–17	Charlotte Checkers	AHL	9	5	3	8	6	—	—	—	—	—
2016–17	Carolina Hurricanes	NHL	57	7	9	16	6	—	—	—	—	—
2017–18	Carolina Hurricanes	NHL	80	16	14	30	22	—	—	—	—	—
2018–19	Carolina Hurricanes	NHL	82	10	16	26	20	15	2	4	6	6
2019–20	Carolina Hurricanes	NHL	68	7	10	17	17	8	1	1	2	2
2020–21	Carolina Hurricanes	NHL	37	8	5	13	6	11	3	1	4	4
2021–22	Pittsburgh Penguins	NHL	64	12	10	22	14	7	1	1	2	4
2022–23	Pittsburgh Penguins	NHL	60	10	6	16	21	—	—	—	—	—
2022–23	Anaheim Ducks	NHL	15	2	1	3	0	—	—	—	—	—
2023–24	Anaheim Ducks	NHL	24	1	2	3	4	—	—	—	—	—
2024–25	Anaheim Ducks	NHL	26	4	4	8	0	—	—	—	—	—
NHL totals			534	80	78	158	120	41	7	7	14	16
