= Pensacola Ice Flyers =

American ice hockey team

- City: Pensacola, Florida
- League: SPHL
- Founded: 2009
- Home arena: Pensacola Bay Center
- Colors: Navy blue, Columbia blue, white
- Owner: Greg Harris
- Head coach: Jeremy Gates
- Media: Pensacola News Journal, WEAR3

Franchise history
- 2009–present: Pensacola Ice Flyers

Championships
- Regular season titles: 1 (2013–14)
- Playoff championships: 4 (2012-13, 2013-14, 2015-16, 2020-21)

The Pensacola Ice Flyers are a professional ice hockey team of the SPHL. The team played their first season in 2009–10. Home games are played at the Pensacola Bay Center, previously home to the ECHL's Pensacola Ice Pilots from 1996 until their folding in 2008.

The "Ice Flyers" name has a double meaning – it is both a tribute to Pensacola's heritage in naval aviation (Naval Air Station Pensacola is home to the legendary Blue Angels and the National Museum of Naval Aviation) and a homage to original owner Tim Kerr, who previously played eleven seasons with the National Hockey League's Philadelphia Flyers.

On April 14, 2013, the Ice Flyers beat the Huntsville Havoc 2–0 in game three of the President's Cup finals to win the franchise's first President's Cup. The win also solidified the city of Pensacola's first professional sports championship. The Ice Flyers have since won the playoff championship in 2014, 2016, and 2021.

== Season-by-season records ==
=== Regular season ===
Season	GP	W	L	OTL	PTS	GF	GA	PIM	Finish
2009–10	56	25	23	8	58	176	205	968	5th of 7, SPHL
2010–11	56	28	28	—	56	187	195	1148	5th of 8, SPHL
2011–12	56	30	22	4	64	187	176	873	4th of 9, SPHL
2012–13	56	33	18	5	71	171	149	1113	3rd of 9, SPHL
2013–14	56	38	13	5	81	207	139	1029	1st of 10, SPHL
2014–15	56	32	18	6	70	179	148	857	3rd of 8, SPHL
2015–16	56	31	20	5	67	175	157	1098	2nd of 9, SPHL
2016–17	56	27	21	8	62	171	154	914	7th of 10, SPHL
2017–18	56	33	16	7	73	189	156	804	3rd of 10, SPHL
2018–19	56	26	24	6	58	143	150	752	7th of 10, SPHL
2019–20 (Note: Season cancelled due to COVID-19 pandemic.)	46	23	11	12	58	127	113	506	4th of 10, SPHL
2020–21	42	18	18	6	42	117	120	530	3rd of 5, SPHL
2021–22	56	31	19	6	68	189	164	757	6th of 11, SPHL
2022–23	57	26	25	6	58	183	190	763	8th of 11, SPHL
2023-24	56	25	27	4	54	170	178	719	7th of 10, SPHL
2024-25	56	15	28	13	43	139	192	750	10th of 10, SPHL
2025-26	58	28	21	9	65	161	172	751	5th of 10, SPHL

=== Postseason ===
Season	GP	W	L	GF	GA	PIM	Finish
2009–10	3	1	2	8	11	72	Lost Quarterfinals
2010–11	3	1	2	8	13	59	Lost Quarterfinals
2011–12	6	4	2	14	8	94	Lost League Finals
2012–13	7	6	1	18	9	86	Won President's Cup
2013–14	7	6	1	28	10	87	Won President's Cup
2014–15	3	1	2	6	7	20	Lost Quarterfinals
2015–16	7	7	0	29	16	69	Won President's Cup
2016–17	4	2	2	9	8	28	Lost Semifinals
2017–18	2	0	2	5	10	32	Lost Quarterfinals
2018–19	3	1	2	7	9	32	Lost Quarterfinals
2019–20	No playoffs after season was cancelled						
2020–21	4	4	0	17	7	31	Won President's Cup
2021–22	3	1	2	11	14	35	Lost Quarterfinals
2022–23	2	0	2	3	5	12	Lost Quarterfinals
2023-24	2	0	2	3	9	51	Lost Quarterfinals
2024-25	0	0	0	0	0	0	Out of Playoffs
2025-26	3	1	2	7	9	17	Lost Quarterfinals

== Former Ice Flyers who represented their country internationally ==
- Roman Andrejev - Andrejev played for the Ice Flyers during his only season of North American professional hockey in 2013–14. Andrejev represented Estonia prior to his time with the Ice Flyers at both the U18 and U20 levels but he made his debut with the Estonian National Team at the 2014 IIHF World Championship Division II, Group A where he was second on the team and tied for third for in the whole tournament in scoring as the Estonians gained promotion to 2015 IIHF World Championship Division I, Group B. He and the Estonians have competed in Division I, Group B since and have avoided relegation back down to Division II, Group A.
- Joey Hughes - Hughes played his rookie professional season, and last season in North America, with the Ice Flyers during their inaugural season. Hughes had represented Australia in the World Championships prior to playing for the Ice Flyers and was unable to play in the 2010 World Championship due to the SPHL Playoffs. He made his return to the Australian National Team for the 2011 World Championships and also competed in the 2012 edition.

== See also ==
- Pensacola Ice Pilots
