= Roanoke Rail Yard Dawgs =

Professional ice hockey team based in Virginia

- City: Roanoke, Virginia
- League: SPHL
- Founded: 2016; 10 years ago
- Home arena: Berglund Center
- Colors: Royal blue, gold, white
- Owner: McGinn family (Note: The franchise is composed of six ownership groups. The principal owners of the team are the McGinn family out of Ontario, Canada–parents, Bob & Cori, and their sons Jamie, Tye, and Brock.)
- Head coach: Dan Bremner
- Captain: Vacant
- Media: The Roanoke Times

Franchise history
- 2009–2014: Mississippi Surge
- 2016–present: Roanoke Rail Yard Dawgs

Championships
- Playoff championships: 1 (2022–23)

The Roanoke Rail Yard Dawgs are a professional ice hockey team and a member of the SPHL. Based in Roanoke, Virginia, the Rail Yard Dawgs play their home games at Berglund Center.

== History ==
The Rail Yard Dawgs are the sixth professional hockey franchise to call the Roanoke Valley home, following the Salem/Roanoke Valley Rebels of the Eastern Hockey League and later the Southern Hockey League (1967–1976), the Salem/Virginia Raiders of the second Eastern Hockey League and Atlantic Coast Hockey League (1980–1983), the Virginia Lancers/Roanoke Valley Rebels/Rampage (1983–1993) of the Atlantic Coast Hockey League and later the East Coast Hockey League, the Roanoke Express of the East Coast Hockey League (1993–2004), and the Roanoke Valley Vipers of the United Hockey League (2005–2006).

On October 20, 2015, an ownership group headed by Bob McGinn purchased the dormant Mississippi Surge franchise and relocated the team to Roanoke for the 2016–17 season. The ownership group consisted of Bob McGinn and his three NHL player sons, Jamie, Tye, and Brock, former Surge owner Tim Kerr, and several other locals. On November 19, the Rail Yard Dawgs name, logo and colors were officially announced. On April 29, 2016, Sam Ftorek was announced the team's first head coach.

The Rail Yard Dawgs played their home opener at the Berglund Center in front of a sellout crowd on October 21, 2016, falling to the Knoxville Ice Bears 2–0. The team started with a 4–3–1 record, but faltered down the stretch, finishing the season with 43 points and a final record of 17–30–9. The team finished in ninth place in the league, five points from qualifying for the final playoff spot. The team drew 87,831 fans over the course of the season with an average of 3,136 per game for fifth highest in the ten team league.

During the 2017–18 season, head coach Ftorek was relieved of his duties after 18 games with a 5–11–2 record. He was replaced by Dan Bremner, a former SPHL player. Under Bremner, the Rail Yard Dawgs went 21–15–2 and qualified in the final seed for the playoffs, but were swept in the first round by the top-seeded Peoria Rivermen. In the second season under Bremner, the Rail Yard Dawgs finished fifth in the league with a 28–24–4 record. Roanoke was again selected by the top-seed Rivermen as their first round opponent and the Rail Yard Dawgs upset the regular season champions in a two-game sweep.

Due to the effects of the COVID-19 pandemic, the Rail Yard Dawgs were one of several SPHL teams to not participate in the 2020–21 season.

In the 2021–22 season, Roanoke would finish 8th out of 11th, qualifying for the last playoff spot (making their third ever appearance in the President’s Cup Playoffs.) Despite losing game 1 of the first round against first place Knoxville, Roanoke would win game 2 at home by a score of 5–1, and win game 3 in Knoxville 3–1. Roanoke would go on to sweep the second place Huntsville Havoc, to make the President’s Cup Final for the first time in franchise history. Roanoke would fall to the Peoria Rivermen 3 games to 1 in the best-of-five final.

Building on their 2022 Finals run, the Dawgs would finish the 2022–23 regular season with a 32–19–3–2 record and 69 points, good enough for the 4th seed in the SPHL playoffs. Roanoke would sweep 5th-seeded Evansville in the first round before dispatching top-seeded Peoria two games to one in the Semifinals. On May 2, 2023, Roanoke defeated the Birmingham Bulls 2–1 in overtime to clinch the SPHL Finals three games to one to earn their first SPHL President's Cup.

== Name, logo, and the railroad connection ==
In a manner similar to previous Berglund Center attendants, the Roanoke Express and Roanoke Steam, the Rail Yard Dawgs name and logo pay tribute to the region's railroad heritage. The city has a long history as a railroad hub and the Berglund Center is in close proximity to the nearby Roanoke Shops and train lines operated by Norfolk Southern Railway, as well as the recently completed Roanoke Amtrak Station. This rail history is further exemplified by the presence of railroad tracks on the team's original logo.

In 2020, the Rail Yard Dawgs rolled out an updated logo and simplified color scheme. The team logo depicts the head of mascot, Diesel, wearing a train conductor hat depicting the Mill Mountain Star, arguably Roanoke's most iconic landmark. The star is also present on the team's alternate logo, which is visible on the shoulders of the team's uniforms.

== Philanthropy ==
The Dawgs have partnered with three local charitable organizations:

- Guns and Hoses Hockey - annual hockey game to benefit the Muscular Dystrophy Association. The game is played at the Berglund Center and pits the Roanoke Police Department (Guns) against the Roanoke Fire Department (Hoses).
- Angels of Assisi - a local organization that operates the largest private animal shelter in the Roanoke Valley, as well as a low cost Community Pet Clinic and farm animal sanctuary.
- Virginia Museum of Transportation - a large museum in Downtown Roanoke that hosts a number of exhibits describing Virginia's transportation history and industry. It also is the home base of the 611 Steam Engine, which was built in Roanoke in the 1940s and has since become a symbol of the city, previously being depicted on the logo of the ECHL's Roanoke Express.

== Season-by-season record ==
Note: GP = Games played, W = Wins, L = Losses, OTL = Overtime/shootout losses, Pts = Points, GF = Goals for, GA = Goals against

Season	GP	W	L	OTL	Pts	GF	GA	Finish	Playoffs
2016–17	56	17	30	9	43	158	216	9th	Did not qualify
2017–18	56	26	26	4	56	170	195	8th	Lost in First Round, 0–2 (Peoria)
2018–19	56	28	24	4	60	168	177	5th	Lost in Semifinals, 1–2 (Birmingham)
2019–20	47	16	22	9	41	117	151	7th	Cancelled due to COVID-19 pandemic
2020–21	Did not participate due to the pandemic								
2021-22	56	23	24	9	55	176	181	8th	Lost in Championship, 1–3 (Peoria)
2022-23	56	32	19	5	69	185	161	4th	Won President's Cup, 3-1 (Birmingham)
2023-24	56	33	15	8	74	207	164	3rd	Lost in Semifinals, 1-2 (Huntsville)
2024-25	56	34	17	5	73	199	160	3rd	Lost in First Round, 1-2 (Knoxville)
2025-2026	58	32	21	3	69	176	157	3rd	Lost in Semifinals, 3-1 (Evansville)

== Awards and trophies ==
Most Valuable Player

- Joe Widmar: 2025–26

Goaltender of the Year

- Brad Barone: 2017–18

Defenseman of the Year

- Matt O'Dea: 2025–26
- Brendan Pepe: 2023–24

Leading Scorer Award

- Joe Widmar: 2025–26
- Nick Ford: 2024–25

Rookie of the Year

- Carson Gallagher: 2024–25

First Team All-Star

- Matt O'Dea: 2025–26
- Joe Widmar: 2025–26
- Brendan Pepe: 2023–24
- Brad Barone: 2017–18

Second Team All-Star

- Travis Broughman: 2025–26
- Stephen Alvo: 2024–25
- Nick Ford: 2024–25
- Matt O'Dea: 2023–24
- Mac Jansen: 2021–22
- Travis Armstrong: 2019–20
- Steve Mele: 2017–18
- Nick Schneider: 2016–17

Playoffs Most Valuable Player

- Austyn Roudebush: 2022–23
