= Kevin Kerr (ice hockey) =

- Born: September 18, 1967 (age 58) North Bay, Ontario, Canada
- Height: 5 ft 10 in (178 cm)
- Weight: 190 lb (86 kg; 13 st 8 lb)
- Position: Right wing
- Shot: Right
- Played for: Rochester Americans; Utica Devils; Portland Pirates
- NHL draft: 56th overall, 1986; Buffalo Sabres
- Playing career: 1987–2005

Kevin Kerr (born September 18, 1967) is a Canadian retired professional hockey player and former head coach of the Flint Generals of the United/International Hockey League.

== Career ==
Kerr was drafted in the third round, 56th overall of the 1986 NHL Draft by the Buffalo Sabres.

On February 4, 2015, Kerr was named the inaugural head coach of the Macon Mayhem of the Southern Professional Hockey League. The club played their first game in October 2015. In his second season as Macon's head coach he won the SPHL's coach of the year, and went on to win the league championship, giving Macon its first professional sports title since the 1962 Macon Peaches baseball team.

Kerr left the Mayhem after the 2017–18 season and was named the head coach of the Greenville Swamp Rabbits in the ECHL. The Swamp Rabbits did not renew his contract after the 2019–20 season and he returned to Macon, where he then won his second SPHL coach of the year for the abbreviated 2020–21 season after he led the team to a regular season championship. Kerr resigned following the season due to personal and family reasons.

== Career statistics ==
			Regular season					Playoffs
Season	Team	League	GP	G	A	Pts	PIM	GP	G	A	Pts	PIM
1983–84	North Bay Centennials	OHL	66	7	19	26	138	4	1	1	2	18
1984–85	Windsor Compuware Spitfires	OHL	57	5	16	21	189	4	0	0	0	22
1985–86	Windsor Compuware Spitfires	OHL	59	21	51	72	266	16	6	8	14	55
1986–87	Windsor Compuware Spitfires	OHL	63	27	41	68	264	14	3	8	11	45
1987–88	Rochester Americans	AHL	72	18	11	29	352	5	1	3	4	42
1988–89	Rochester Americans	AHL	66	20	18	38	306	—	—	—	—	—
1989–90	Phoenix Roadrunners	IHL	6	0	0	0	25	—	—	—	—	—
1989–90	Fort Wayne Komets	IHL	43	11	16	27	219	5	0	1	1	33
1989–90	Rochester Americans	AHL	8	0	1	1	22	—	—	—	—	—
1990–91	Cincinnati Cyclones	ECHL	36	25	34	59	228	4	0	6	6	23
1990–91	Fort Wayne Komets	IHL	13	1	6	7	32	—	—	—	—	—
1991–92	Cincinnati Cyclones	ECHL	37	27	18	45	203	9	4	9	13	64
1991–92	Utica Devils	AHL	19	3	3	6	25	—	—	—	—	—
1992–93	Birmingham Bulls	ECHL	39	30	34	64	217	—	—	—	—	—
1992–93	Cincinnati Cyclones	IHL	39	18	23	41	93	—	—	—	—	—
1993–94	Flint Generals	CoHL	45	57	55	112	299	7	7	6	13	79
1993–94	Phoenix Roadrunners	IHL	12	2	4	6	9	—	—	—	—	—
1993–94	Portland Pirates	AHL	4	2	0	2	2	8	0	3	3	21
1994–95	Flint Generals	CoHL	62	63	56	119	284	4	6	1	7	2
1995–96	Flint Generals	CoHL	66	53	47	100	204	15	11	15	26	24
1996–97	Flint Generals	CoHL	68	72	53	125	200	13	10	6	16	35
1997–98	Flint Generals	UHL	67	63	48	111	208	16	9	12	21	62
1998–99	Quad City Mallards	UHL	49	32	36	68	108	16	5	6	11	29
1998–99	Mobile Mysticks	ECHL	12	6	8	14	57	—	—	—	—	—
1999–00	Quad City Mallards	UHL	68	49	49	98	162	10	2	5	7	24
2000–01	Phoenix Mustangs	WCHL	34	18	9	27	45	—	—	—	—	—
2000–01	Flint Generals	UHL	30	18	23	41	97	—	—	—	—	—
2001–02	Toledo Storm	ECHL	61	27	27	54	120	—	—	—	—	—
2002–03	Elmira Jackals	UHL	33	11	9	20	51	—	—	—	—	—
2002–03	Rockford IceHogs	UHL	18	14	12	26	12	3	2	0	2	8
2003–04	Flint Generals	UHL	53	22	25	47	90	3	0	2	2	0
2004–05	Flint Generals	UHL	26	8	11	19	39	—	—	—	—	—
2004–05	Kalamazoo Wings	UHL	13	7	8	15	22	6	1	0	1	4
AHL totals			169	43	33	76	707	13	1	6	7	63
ECHL totals			185	115	121	236	825	13	4	15	19	87
UHL totals			357	224	221	445	789	54	19	25	44	127
