= Huntsville Havoc =

American ice hockey team

- City: Huntsville, Alabama
- League: SPHL
- Founded: 2004
- Home arena: Von Braun Center
- Colors: Black, red, white, silver
- Owners: HSV Sports, LLC
- Head coach: Stuart Stefan
- Captain: Dom Procopio
- Website: https://www.huntsvillehavoc.com/

Franchise history
- 2004–present: Huntsville Havoc

Championships
- Playoff championships: 3 (2009–10, 2017–18, 2018–19)

The Huntsville Havoc are a professional ice hockey team in the SPHL. They play their home games at the Von Braun Center in downtown Huntsville, Alabama.

== History ==
The team began play in the 2004–05 season, following the defunct Huntsville Channel Cats of the South East Hockey League. The team finished sixth out of eight teams in the regular season in 2004–05 and lost a one-game playoff to the Jacksonville Barracudas. In 2006, Huntsville finished fifth in the league and was defeated two games to none by the Florida Seals in the second round of playoffs after knocking off the defending league champion Columbus Cottonmouths in three games in the opening round. In 2007, Huntsville's fourth-place regular season finish was for naught as they were swept out of the playoffs by the eventual league champion Fayetteville FireAntz.

In 2008, the Havoc finished last in the SPHL standings and were the only team left out of the league playoffs. Immediately following the conclusion of the season, the team announced it would not renew the contract of head coach John Gibson, who had led the Havoc through all four SPHL seasons, coached the SEHL Channel Cats to the league championship in 2004, and was an All-Star defenseman for the CHL version of the Channel Cats. Eric Soltys was named head coach of the team for the 2008–09 season with Paul Snell serving as his assistant. In the 2008–09 SPHL season the Havoc finished in fourth place. In the 2009 SPHL Playoffs the Havoc was beaten in the first round by the eventual SPHL champions (Knoxville Ice Bears) in 5 games (5 game series). With Randy Murphy taking over coaching duties in 2009–10, the Havoc finished season play in second place, earning a team-record 71 points. The Havoc entered the SPHL playoffs as the #2 seed. In round 1 Huntsville defeated the Pensacola Ice Flyers 2 games to 1. In round 2 the Havoc swept the Knoxville Ice Bears. The Havoc then went on to sweep the Mississippi Surge in the finals, winning their first SPHL President's Cup. In the 2010–11 season, the Havoc finished 3rd in the regular season and lost in the first round of the playoffs to Columbus.

In the 2018 SPHL playoffs, the fourth-seeded Havoc defeated the Mississippi RiverKings in the Challenge Round 2-game-to-1, the Macon Mayhem in the semifinals 2-games-to-1, and the top-seeded Peoria Rivermen 2-games-to-1 in the finals to claim the franchise's second President's Cup. It was the first time in league history that a fourth-seeded team won the championship.

In 2019, the Huntsville Havoc repeated as SPHL President's Cup Champions by defeating the Birmingham Bulls 2-games-to-0 in the finals.

In 2026, Zawyer Sports and Entertainment purchased the controlling interest of the team.

== Year-by-year record ==
Season	GP	W	L	OTL	Pts	Pct	GF	GA	PIM	Coach	Finish	Playoffs
2004–05	56	29	27	—	58	0.518	183	181	1542	John Gibson	6th	Lost in first round, 1–2 (Jacksonville)
2005–06	56	32	21	3	67	0.571	203	186	1905	John Gibson	5th	Lost in second round, 1–2 (Florida)
2006–07	56	29	23	4	62	0.554	221	210	2108	John Gibson	4th	Lost in first round, 0–2 (Fayetteville)
2007–08	52	23	27	2	48	0.462	195	211	1451	John Gibson	7th	Did not qualify
2008–09	60	29	24	7	65	0.542	204	197	1335	Eric Soltys	4th	Lost in first round, 2–3 (Knoxville)
2009–10	58	31	16	9	71	0.634	199	178	1273	Randy Murphy	2nd	Won Championship, 3–0 (Mississippi)
2010–11	56	30	26	—	60	0.536	168	158	1006	Randy Murphy	3rd	Lost in first round, 0–2 (Columbus)
2011–12	56	22	28	6	50	0.446	163	198	1229	Randy Murphy/Keith Jeffries/Glenn Detulleo	8th	Lost in second round, 0–2 (Columbus)
2012–13	56	21	29	6	48	0.429	135	179	1379	Glenn Detulleo	8th	Lost in championship, 1–2 (Pensacola)
2013–14	56	31	21	4	66	0.589	180	158	991	Glenn Detulleo	5th	Lost in second round, 0–2 (Columbus)
2014–15	56	11	38	7	29	.259	130	184	1250	Glenn Detulleo	8th	Did not qualify
2015–16	56	26	26	4	56	.500	151	158	1282	Glenn Detulleo	7th	Lost in first round, 0–2 (Pensacola)
2016–17	56	34	16	6	74	.661	200	165	849	Glenn Detulleo	4th	Lost in semifinals, 1–2 (Peoria)
2017–18	56	30	16	10	70	.625	203	180	923	Glenn Detulleo	4th	Won Championship, 2–1 (Peoria)
2018–19	56	36	17	3	75	.670	209	152	632	Glenn Detulleo	3rd	Won Championship, 2–0 (Birmingham)
2019–20	46	27	14	5	59	.641	144	124	675	Glenn Detulleo	3rd	Season cancelled
2020–21	42	19	22	1	39	.464	123	137	392	Glenn Detulleo	4th	Lost in semifinals, 0–2 (Pensacola)
2021–22	56	41	13	2	84	.750	194	124	697	Glenn Detulleo	2nd	Lost in semifinals, 0–2 (Roanoke)
2022–23	56	34	19	3	71	.634	197	162	826	Glenn Detulleo	3rd	Lost in semifinals, 1–2 (Birmingham)

=== Attendance ===
Year	Total	Games	Average	League average
2004–05	75,978	28	2,713	2,440
2005–06	87,871	28	3,138	2,720
2006–07	109,615	28	3,914	2,985
2007–08	99,672	26	3,833	2,969
2008–09	106,848	30	3,561	2,921
2009–10	98,365	28	3,513	3,041
2010–11	98,327	28	3,513	2,762
2011–12	94,354	28	3,369	2,796
2012–13	98,383	28	3,514	2,804
2013–14	103,993	28	3,714	3,000
2014–15	100,381	28	3,585	3,248
2015–16	117,298	28	4,187	3,034
2016–17	130,166	28	4,648	2,967
2017–18	133,672	28	4,774	3,214
2018–19	138,106	28	4,932	3,132
2019–20	110,869	23	4,820	3,137
2020–21	44,136	21	2,102	1,747
2021–22	134,713	28	4,811	2,872
2022–23	154,362	28	5,513	3,446
2023–24	166,871	28	5,960	4,105
2024–25	174,927	28	6,247	4,288

=== Honored numbers ===
The following numbers were retired by the Huntsville Havoc.

Name	Number	Tenure
Chris George	17	Channel Cats 1996–2000; Tornado 2001
Mike Degurse	33	Channel Cats 1996–2000, 2004; Havoc 2004–07
John Gibson	23	Channel Cats 1995–2000, as coach 2003–04; Havoc coach 2004–2008
Matt Carmichael	29	Channel Cats 1999-2000, 2003-2004; Tornado 2000-2001; Havoc 2004-2008
Stuart Stefan	7	Havoc 2011–18, as coach 2018-present
Nolan Kaiser	10	Havoc 2015-2022
Tyler Piacentini	14	Havoc 2017-2023, as coach 2023-present

== Records ==
through 2022-23 season

=== Career ===
Games	379	Stuart Stefan (2011–2018)
Goals	115	Sy Nutkevitch (2016–2023)
Assists	256	Sy Nutkevitch (2016–2023)
Points	371	Sy Nutkevitch (2016–2023)
Penalty minutes	994	Luke Phillips (2004–2007)
Wins	92	Matt Carmichael (2004–2008)
Shutouts	7	Dan McWhinney (2009–2013) Max Milosek (2018-2023)

=== Single-season ===
Goals	37	Travis Kauffeldt (2008–09)
Assists	52	James Patterson (2006–07)
Points	78	James Patterson (2006–07)
Penalty minutes	396	Luke Phillips (2005–06)
GAA	1.93	Hunter Vorva (2021–22)
SV%	.934	Hunter Vorva (2021–22)
