= Peoria Rivermen (SPHL) =

American ice hockey team

- City: Peoria, Illinois
- League: SPHL
- Founded: 2013
- Home arena: Carver Arena
- Colors: Red, navy, gold, white
- Owner: CSH International Inc.
- General manager: Jean-Guy Trudel
- Head coach: Jean-Guy Trudel
- Media: Peoria Journal Star

Championships
- Regular season titles: 7 (2014–15, 2015–16, 2017–18, 2018–19, 2022–23, 2024–25, 2025-26)
- Playoff championships: 2 (2021–22, 2023–24)

The Peoria Rivermen are a professional ice hockey team in the SPHL. They play in Peoria, Illinois, United States at the Carver Arena. The team replaced an American Hockey League franchise of the same name that was purchased by the Vancouver Canucks and moved out of Peoria to Utica, New York.

The Rivermen are one of the few teams in the SPHL outside the southern United States, along with the Bloomington Thunder (2013–14 season only), the Evansville Thunderbolts (since the 2016–17 season), and the Quad City Storm (since the 2018–19 season).

Due to the effects of the COVID-19 pandemic, the Rivermen were one of several SPHL teams to not participate in the 2020–21 season.

== History ==
On May 13, 2013, it was reported by the Peoria Journal Star that after being told the city would no longer have an AHL team, former Rivermen executives John Butler and Bart Rogers and former Rivermen owner Bruce Saurs announced that they had applied for admission into the Southern Professional Hockey League in an attempt to save hockey in Peoria. The SPHL is a low-minor hockey league with teams mostly based in the southeastern United States. Butler and Rogers' plan also included for the group to purchase the Bloomington Blaze of the struggling Central Hockey League and also move them to the SPHL. There was an SPHL Board of Governors and franchise general managers emergency conference call scheduled for the morning of May 14, 2013, to decide on the admission of the Rivermen and the Blaze.

On May 15, 2013, it was officially announced that the team had been accepted into the SPHL, along with the newly named Bloomington Thunder, ending the uncertainty of whether Peoria would have a minor professional hockey team in the coming year. Both teams were owned by Illinois Pro Sports, LLC. The Thunder would be shut down after one season when another ownership group obtained an expansion team in the junior United States Hockey League for Bloomington, isolating the Rivermen in the north.

In 2017, the majority ownership of the Rivermen was sold to CSH International Inc., the same owners of the Bloomington USHL franchise, with the former owners, Bart Rogers and John Butler, staying on with minority ownership.

On May 3, 2022, the Rivermen beat the Roanoke Rail Yard Dawgs in game four of the President's Cup finals in overtime to win the franchise's first President's Cup.

On April 7, 2023, the Rivermen and the Peoria Civic Center Authority (PCCA) made a joint announcement that, pending approval by the PCCA at their next scheduled meeting, the Rivermen would commit to playing the 2023-2024 season at the Civic Center, with a renewal option for the 2024-2025 season. The announcement came on the heels of the start of the Rivermen's playoff series to defend their President's Cup title in 2023. Bart Rogers, co-owner of the team, said “Being a part of the Peoria Hockey community is at the heart of the Peoria Rivermen culture and we’re excited to renew with the Peoria Civic Center, continue long-term discussions, and to defend our title.”
