= Birmingham Bulls (SPHL) =

American ice hockey team

- City: Pelham, Alabama
- League: SPHL
- Founded: 2017
- Home arena: Pelham Civic Center
- Colors: Red, black, grey, white
- General manager: Joe Stroud
- Head coach: Craig Simchuk
- Website: www.bullshockey.net

Franchise history
- 2017–present: Birmingham Bulls

Championships
- Regular season titles: 1 (2023–24)

The Birmingham Bulls are a professional ice hockey team in the Birmingham metropolitan area, that began to play in the 2017–18 season as a member of the Southern Professional Hockey League (SPHL). The team is named after the previous Birmingham-area teams in the World Hockey Association and East Coast Hockey League.

== History ==
In 1992, Art Clarkson obtained the rights to an East Coast Hockey League (ECHL) franchise for Birmingham and named it after the former World Hockey Association team, the Birmingham Bulls. However, he sold the ECHL team in 1997 and it eventually relocated in 2001. In early 2017, Clarkson began proposing a new Bulls team to begin play due to the increased presence of hockey in the area. Due to arena issues, the team could not play at the Birmingham–Jefferson Convention Complex like the former teams, but instead settled on the smaller Pelham Civic Center in nearby Pelham, Alabama, in February 2017. The Southern Professional Hockey League (SPHL) announced its approval of the Bulls as an expansion team on April 26, 2017. Longtime ECHL Bulls' player Jamey Hicks was named as the inaugural head coach and director of hockey operations.

In their inaugural season, the team finished second-to-last and missed the playoffs. In their second season, the team improved and had the second best regular season record in the league led by the SPHL's most valuable player Josh Harris, goaltender of the year Mavric Parks, and coach of the year Jamey Hicks. Birmingham advanced in the 2019 playoffs to the championships, but were defeated by the defending champion Huntsville Havoc. After the season, Art Clarkson stepped down as the managing partner of team and died later that year.

The 2019–20 season was curtailed by the COVID-19 pandemic. During the pandemic, head coach Jamey Hicks resigned before the 2020–21 season in order to remain in Canada but was still a consultant for the team. He was replaced by Craig Simchuk.

The Bulls made their second playoff appearance in the 2022-23 season after finishing with the league's second best record. Simchuk was named Coach of the Year after a 36-point turnaround from a ninth place finish the previous season. In the first round, Birmingham weathered a Game 1 overtime loss in Fayetteville by taking the next two at home to win the quarterfinal series. In the semifinals, the Bulls faced their in-state rival Huntsville Havoc. The best-of-three saw the first two games won by the respective home team 3-2, each in overtime. In the deciding Game 3, the Bulls and Havoc each scored two in the second period before Stefan Brucato's rebound goal took the definitive lead for the Bulls. Two empty-netters helped finish the 5-2 victory and a date in the President's Cup Finals against the Roanoke Rail Yard Dawgs. The Bulls split Games 1 and 2 at home. In Roanoke, the Bulls scored late third period goals to tie Games 3 and 4, but would fall in overtime in both games.

The 2023-24 season saw history for the Bulls both for under the current SPHL organization and in the Bulls' long-term history. The club set a franchise record for points and goals allowed. In doing so, they became the first Bulls team in Birmingham's hockey history to finish first in a league's regular season and secured the William B. Coffee Trophy. Unfortunately for the Bulls, their quest for the club's first postseason title ended abruptly, falling to the eight-seed Evansville Thunderbolts 2-1 in the first round.

== Season-by-season record ==
Note: GP = Games played, W = Wins, L = Losses, T = Ties, OTL = Overtime Losses, SOL = Shootout Losses, Pts = Points, GF = Goals for, GA = Goals against

President's Cup champion	William B. Coffey Trophy	President's Cup finals	Playoff appearance							
Season	GP	W	L	OTL	SOL	Pts	GF	GA	Standings	Playoffs
2017-18	56	22	28	5	1	50	159	200	9th	Did not qualify
2018-19	56	39	15	2	0	80	204	147	2nd	Won in quarterfinals, 2-1 (Fayetteville); Won in semifinals, 2-1 (Roanoke); Lost in President's Cup finals, 0-2 (Huntsville)
2019-20	46	17	23	4	2	40	122	161	T-9th	No playoffs due to COVID-19
2020-21	42	12	23	7	0	31	103	161	5th	Did not qualify^{1}
2021-22	56	18	32	5	1	42	144	198	9th	Did not qualify
2022-23	57	37	16	2	2	78	217	162	2nd	Won in quarterfinals, 2-1 (Fayetteville); Won in semifinals, 2-1 (Huntsville); Lost in President's Cup finals, 1-3 (Roanoke)
2023-24	56	38	9	6	3	85	198	132	1st	Lost in quarterfinals, 2-1 (Evansville)

1: Due to COVID-19, only five of the ten SPHL teams played the condensed 2020-21 season with the top four making the playoffs.
