= Quad City Storm =

American ice hockey team

- City: Moline, Illinois
- League: SPHL
- Founded: 2018
- Home arena: Vibrant Arena at The MARK
- Head coach: Shayne Toporowski
- Website: www.quadcitystorm.com

Franchise history
- 2009–2016: Louisiana IceGators
- 2018–present: Quad City Storm

The Quad City Storm is a professional minor league ice hockey team. They began play in the 2018–19 season as a member of the SPHL. The team is based in the Quad Cities area of Illinois and Iowa, with home games at the Vibrant Arena at The MARK in Moline, Illinois. The team replaced the ECHL's Quad City Mallards after the ownership ceased operations of the team in 2018. Due to the effects of the COVID-19 pandemic, the Storm were one of several SPHL teams to not participate in the 2020–21 season; they returned to play the following season.

== History ==
In 2018, the Quad City Mallards' owner Jordan Melville stated he was folding the team after losing about US$4 million since he became the sole owner in 2013. On May 24, 2018, local ownership consisting of Ryan Mosley and John Dawson obtained a franchise in the Southern Professional Hockey League to replace the Mallards at the TaxSlayer Center for the 2018–19 season by purchasing the franchise rights of the defunct Louisiana IceGators. Former original Mallards' owner Howard Cornfield was brought on as a consultant. The team hired longtime SPHL player Dave Pszenyczny as their inaugural head coach. As the Mallards name was unavailable due to the ECHL retaining the trademark, the new team held a name-the-team contest with new name announced as the Quad City Storm on June 21. In May 2024, Shayne Toporowski was name new head coach of the Quad City Storm replacing Dave Pszenyczny after a long 6 years with the Storm.

== Records ==
=== 2018–19 ===
The Storm finished their inaugural season in ninth place out of ten teams, missing the 2019 President's Cup playoffs. The team had a final record of 18–33–5, scoring an average of 2.55 goals per game and allowing an average of 3.45 goals against per game.

=== 2019–20 ===
The sophomore season for the Storm, the team fared slightly better with a final record of 16–20–8. The team was in seventh place out of the ten teams due to points percentage, but was tied for last in the league in total points, before the COVID-19 pandemic curtailed the 2019–20 season on March 15, 2020.

=== 2021-22 ===
The Senior season for the Storm, the team did much better with a final record of 32-15-9. The team was in fifth place out of the ten teams and made into the 2022 playoffs, but lost to the Rivermen in the Semifinals 1-2.

=== 2022-23 ===
During the SPHL 2022-23 season, the team would miss the playoffs with a record of 23-32-2 with the team in ninth place out of eleven teams.

=== 2023-24 ===
During the 2023-24 season, the Storm made it into the playoffs with a record of 32-23-1 with the team placed in sixth place out of ten teams. But the team lost in the first round of the playoffs against Roanoke.

2024-25

During the 2024-25 season, the Storm made it into the playoffs with a record of 24-27-5 with the team placed in eighth place out of ten teams. But the team lost in the first round of the playoffs against the Rivermen in a 0-2 sweep.

2025-26

During the SPHL 2025-26 season, the team would miss the playoffs with a record of 25-28-5 with the team in ninth place out of ten teams.
