= Macon Mayhem =

- City: Macon, Georgia
- League: SPHL
- Founded: 2010
- Home arena: Macon Coliseum
- Colors: Black, Red, Ice Blue, White
- Owner: Charles Norris Jr.
- Head coach: Dave Pszenyczny
- Captain: Alex Cohen
- Media: The Telegraph; WMAZ-TV; WMGT-TV

Franchise history
- 2010–2013: Augusta RiverHawks
- 2015–present: Macon Mayhem

Championships
- Regular season titles: 2 (2016–17, 2020–21)
- Playoff championships: 1 (2016-17)

The Macon Mayhem is an SPHL team based in Macon, Georgia that plays in the Macon Coliseum. The team was formerly the Augusta RiverHawks, which suspended operations for the 2013–14 season due to an ice-system failure at James Brown Arena.

== History ==
The franchise originally played in Augusta, Georgia, as the Augusta RiverHawks from 2010 to 2013. Talks of relocation began in October 2013, when the RiverHawks, the city of Augusta, and Global Spectrum failed to reach an agreement on replacing the James Brown Arena's ice system at a cost of $1.2 million; additionally, the team, city officials and arena officials could not reach a settlement regarding the eight home games lost due to the ice system's failure. Team owner Bob Kerzner had not initially considered relocating to Macon; however Macon Centreplex officials had contacted the league, showing interest in bringing a team, either by expansion or relocation, to Macon. On June 17, 2014, the Macon-Bibb Commission approved a five-year deal for the RiverHawks in the Coliseum. On June 25, the RiverHawks made their move to Macon official, unveiling their new name, colors, and logo. The team did not take to the ice until the 2015–16 SPHL season to allow the team to establish its business relations and fanbase in central Georgia. On February 4, 2015, Kevin Kerr was hired as the director of hockey operations and head coach of the Mayhem.

In the Mayhem's second season, the team clinched the President's Cup, sweeping the Peoria Rivermen 2–0 in the championship series.

After the team's third season, head coach Kevin Kerr was hired by the Greenville Swamp Rabbits of the ECHL as head coach. The Mayhem then promoted assistant coach Leo Thomas as head coach for the 2018–19 season. Under Thomas, the Mayhem went 27–24–5 and lost in the first round of the playoffs in the 2018–19 season. After a 2–6–2 start to the 2019–20 season, the Mayhem released Thomas and assistant coach Ryan Michel took over.

On January 28, 2020, team officials renewed their lease with the Macon Coliseum for another five years. However, the season was then curtailed by the COVID-19 pandemic in March. After Kerr was released by Greenville, he returned as the head coach of Macon in July 2020. Team owner Bob Kerzner then sold the team to a local ownership group, Georgia Pro Sports Ventures, LLC in August 2020. Kerr coached the team through the 2020–21 season and a regular season championship with a 32–6–4 record before resigning again due to personal and family reasons.

In August 2021, the Mayhem named Tulsa Oilers' assistant coach Zac Desjardins as the head coach for its 2021–22 season.
