= Pelham Civic Center =

Multi-purpose arena in Pelham, Alabama

Coordinates: 33.329°N 86.789°W

Pelham Civic Complex and Ice Arena
- Interactive map of Pelham Civic Complex and Ice Arena
- Address: 500 Amphitheater Road; Pelham, AL 35124
- Location: Pelham, Alabama
- Owner: City of Pelham
- Operator: VenuWorks
- Capacity: 4,100

Construction
- Built: 1997

Tenants
- Alabama Slammers (WHA2) 2003–2004; Birmingham Bulls (SPHL) 2017–present Magic City SC (NISL) 2024; Pelham Prowlers (NA3HL) 2025–present

Website
- https://www.pelhamciviccomplex.com

Pelham Civic Complex is a 4,100-seat multi-purpose arena in Pelham, Alabama. It features two NHL size ice skating rinks with a holding capacity of 500 skaters, a skating school, ice skating birthday party rooms, and a multi-purpose banquet area. Its hockey capacity is 4,100; the arena has 17,000 square feet (1,600 m^{2}) of floor space.

It is the only public ice skating rink in the Birmingham, Alabama area. It also houses several other functions, such as corporate events, conventions, sporting contests, trade shows, and as the home of the SPHL team the Birmingham Bulls.

== History ==
It was home to the Alabama Slammers ice hockey team, and the Birmingham Bulls starting in 2017. It is now the home of the club teams of the University of Alabama and the University of Alabama-Birmingham. It is also home to the Pelham Youth Hockey League (PYHL), and hosts the Birmingham area youth travel hockey program (BYHL). It is the home of the Birmingham Figure Skating Club and the Figure Skating Club at UAB.

It has previously hosted the Harlem Globetrotters.

In 2016, the rink hosted National Theatre on Ice.

== Skating School ==
The Pelham Skating School located in the Pelham Civic Complex is attended by over 400 students. It is directed by Susie Gray. The program is associated with the United States Figure Skating Association and both hosts and competes in varying competitions. Classes are divided by skill level and each class is led by a skate coach. Private and public lessons are offered year-round.

== See also ==
- List of convention centers in the United States
