= Sports in Orlando, Florida =

Overview of sports opportunities in Orlando, Florida

Orlando, Florida, has a history of major events in sports. It has had a considerable measure of success in minor league sports as well, with teams winning several minor league championships.

== Major league sports ==
Club	Sport	League	Venue	Average Attendance	Founded	Titles
Orlando Magic	Basketball	NBA	Kia Center	16,785	1989	0
Orlando City SC	Soccer	MLS	Inter.co Stadium	20,573	2015	0
Orlando Pride	Soccer	NWSL	Inter.co Stadium	N/A	2016	1
Orlando Storm	American football	UFL	Inter.co Stadium	N/A	2025	0
Orlando Pirates	Indoor football	IFL	Kia Center	N/A	2018	0
Orlando Valkyries	Volleyball	MLV	Addition Financial Arena	5,000	2023	1

=== Orlando Magic (NBA) ===
Orlando is home to the Orlando Magic, an NBA professional basketball franchise that plays at Kia Center in downtown Orlando. The Magic hosted the 1992 NBA All-Star Game at the Amway Arena, and hosted the 2012 NBA All-Star Game at the Amway Center.

=== Orlando City SC (MLS) ===
Orlando City SC began play in Major League Soccer in 2015 as the league's 20th team. In 2022, Orlando City SC won the Lamar Hunt U.S. Open Cup, U.S. Soccer’s National Championship, by defeating Sacramento Republic SC 3–0

The effort to bring an MLS expansion team to Orlando had been led by Phil Rawlins, who was working since 2010 to bring MLS to Orlando. MLS officially announced in November 2013 that Orlando would join MLS, after the club had received the necessary approvals from city and county officials to construct a new stadium. Orlando City plays in Inter.co Stadium in downtown Orlando, completed in 2017. They played their first and second seasons at the venue then known as the Orlando Citrus Bowl. Orlando had been previously considered for a Major League Soccer franchise following its 1994 World Cup success, but no willing investors were identified at the time.

Orlando has hosted the 1998 MLS All-Star Game, where the U.S. All-Stars beat the World All-Stars, 6–1, and the 2019 MLS All-Star Game, where Atlético Madrid defeated the MLS All-Stars, 3–0.

=== Orlando Pride (NWSL) ===
The Orlando Pride is a professional women's soccer team based in Orlando, Florida and operated by Orlando City SC. The team joined the National Women's Soccer League, the top level of women's soccer in the US, for the 2016 season, and has played in the venue now known as Inter.co Stadium since starting play. The Orlando Pride are the 2024 NWSL Shield Winners and the 2024 National Women’s Soccer League Champions.

=== Orlando Valkyries (MLV) ===
The Orlando Valkyries are an American professional indoor volleyball team based in Orlando, Florida. One of the seven charter members of the Pro Volleyball Federation, the Valkyries are set to begin play for the league's inaugural 2024 season. The Valkyries play their home games at Addition Financial Arena.

=== Orlando Monarchs(WPF) ===
The Orlando Monarchs was an American Softball team based in Orlando, Florida. Formerly the Texas Monarchs, they moved from Bobcat Softball Stadium to the University of Central Florida Softball Complex, where they were set to play their first season of Women's Professional Fastpitch in Orlando for the 2025 season.

== College ==
The UCF Knights, the athletics teams of the University of Central Florida, compete in NCAA Division I. They joined the Football Bowl Subdivision in 1996, Conference USA in 2005, the American Athletic Conference in 2013, and the Big 12 Conference in 2023. The UCF Knights football team won the Conference USA championship in 2007 and 2010, and the American Conference championship in 2013, 2014, and 2017. Its women's soccer program has produced several high-profile players, including FIFA 100 honoree Michelle Akers. The campus features the Acrisure Bounce House for football and Addition Financial Arena for basketball, both built in 2007. Other facilities include Jay Bergman Field (baseball), the UCF Soccer and Track Stadium (soccer, track and field), and The Venue at UCF (women's volleyball).

Orlando also has Camping World Stadium (formerly known as the Tangerine Bowl, then Citrus Bowl). It was formerly the home of several different teams, and is currently the home of the Citrus Bowl game (historically the Tangerine Bowl game), the Cure Bowl, and the Pop-Tarts Bowl (created as the Florida Sunshine Classic, but never known by that name). It also hosts a regular season game called the Florida Classic between the NCAA Division I FCS football teams from Florida A&M University and Bethune–Cookman University, and the state's high-school football finals.

== International soccer ==
Orlando has hosted matches for several high-profile international soccer tournaments. In the 1994 FIFA World Cup, Orlando's Citrus Bowl hosted five matches—four group-stage matches and one Round of 16 match—with Ireland, the Netherlands, Belgium, and Morocco each playing multiple matches at the stadium. Each of the five games drew an attendance of over 60,000.

Orlando also hosted six group stage matches for the 1996 Summer Olympics men's soccer tournament—three each in Groups B and D—with an average attendance of over 20,000 per game. Orlando also hosted three Group E matches for the 1996 women's tournament, with similar attendance figures.

The Florida Cup started in 2015 and hosts international clubs from several European and South American countries at stadiums across central Florida, including Spectrum Stadium and Exploria Stadium.

In June 2016, Camping World Stadium hosted three group stage matches for the Copa América Centenario.

In October 2017, Orlando City Stadium, now known as Inter.co Stadium, hosted a 2018 FIFA World Cup qualification match for the CONCACAF fifth-round of qualifying (also known as the Hexagonal). The United States defeated Panama 4–0 in a push to qualify for the 2018 FIFA World Cup, which ultimately failed.

In March 2018, Orlando City Stadium hosted two matches in that year's SheBelieves Cup, featuring the women's national teams of England, France, Germany, and the 2015 FIFA Women's World Cup winner, the United States.

As of February 2018, Orlando is one of 26 remaining potential host cities and Camping World Stadium is one of 29 remaining potential host venues in the United 2026 FIFA World Cup bid, the joint bid of the United States, Canada, and Mexico to host the 2026 FIFA World Cup. The final version of the bid will include 20–25 venues, selected from the original 49 in consideration.

== Minor league and semi-pro teams ==
=== Soccer ===
The original iteration of Orlando City SC played in the third division USL Pro from 2011 to 2014. In 2010, Steve Donner formed Orlando Pro Soccer which was awarded a future United Soccer Leagues pro expansion slot for 2011. Later that year, Phil Rawlins moved the Austin Aztex FC to Orlando and formed Orlando City SC, beginning play in USL Pro in 2011. Orlando City won the 2011 USL Pro Championship, and the highest attendance in the league while playing at the Citrus Bowl during its first three seasons. 2014 saw a decline in attendance that resulted from being forced to move to a smaller venue at ESPN Wide World of Sports Complex in Walt Disney World Resort during the renovation of the Citrus Bowl. After Orlando City SC joined Major League Soccer, the organization added Orlando City B to the Tier III United Soccer League (USL), which was eventually given Tier II status in 2017. The B team went on hiatus for the 2018 season and returned for the 2019 season in the new Tier III USL League One. City SC pulled City B out of USL1 after the 2020 season, and City B resumed play in 2022 in a new Tier III league, MLS Next Pro.

The Central Florida Kraze formed in the Premier Development Soccer League (later named Premier Development League), the highest amateur league (4th tier overall) in the United States soccer league system, in 1998. Playing in Orange and Seminole Counties, the team won the PDL championship in 2004. Orlando City eventually took over several youth soccer groups and the Kraze to form a unified soccer development system under their brand. Orlando City has since been represented by teams in several levels of the United Soccer Leagues, including the Super Y-League, Super-20 League and PDL.

=== Baseball ===
Professional baseball has been played in Orlando since 1919, primarily in the Class A Florida State League, until the Orlando Twins joined the AA Southern League in 1973. Tinker Field, named for baseball hall-of-famer Joe Tinker, was a historic baseball stadium next to Camping World Stadium (formerly called the Citrus Bowl), but was demolished in 2015, and was commemorated by a history plaza. It was formerly the spring training home of the Minnesota Twins (and the Washington Senators before they relocated to Minneapolis) and the AA Southern League affiliates of the Twins, Chicago Cubs and Tampa Bay Devil Rays.

The Orlando area was home to spring training for one Major League Baseball team. The Atlanta Braves trained at ESPN Wide World of Sports Complex at Walt Disney World Resort. In 2017, the Braves Class A Advanced affiliate, the Florida Fire Frogs of the Florida State League, moved into Osceola County Stadium in Kissimmee. The Disney stadium hosted first-round (Pool D) games in the 2006 World Baseball Classic and two three-game series between for the Tampa Bay Rays in 2007 and 2008. As is common with spring training complexes in Florida, the stadium currently hosts the Braves' rookie league affiliate, the Gulf Coast Braves.

There had been a grassroots campaign to attract Major League Baseball permanently to Orlando, with initial speculation pointed to the group building an MLB-class stadium with private financing. However, the group has settled for attracting a Class-A minor-league team with a new stadium on International Drive. They announced they were discussing a possible purchase of the Tampa Yankees in 2010, but those plans fell apart when a potential stadium construction deal was struck down.

=== Ice hockey ===
In the 1990s, ice hockey became popular in Orlando, perhaps due to large influx of northerners to the city. In the 1993–94 NHL season, the Tampa Bay Lightning played four "home" games at the Orlando Arena, with a 1–2–1 record.

In 2011, an investment group announced that they were approved to lease Amway Center for a new franchise in the mid-level ECHL, which was formally awarded on November 1, 2011. Two weeks later, it was announced that they had received the blessing of previous owner Rich DeVos to revive the Orlando Solar Bears name. The team began play in the 2012–13 ECHL season, with their first game against the Florida Everblades in Estero, Florida, on October 12, 2012. Their home opener was October 20, 2012, also against the Everblades. The DeVos family eventually purchased the ECHL Solar Bears in 2017.

=== Women's football ===
Orlando is home to the Orlando Anarchy, a women's professional football team that plays in the WFA (Women's Football Alliance). The Orlando Anarchy have been playing since 2010, formerly known as the Central Florida Anarchy.

In 2018, the Anarchy won the WFA Division 3 National Championship.

== Venues ==
Venue	Capacity	Opened	Owner	Teams
Acrisure Bounce House	44,206	2007	University of Central Florida	UCF Football
UCF Soccer and Track Stadium	2,000	1991	University of Central Florida	UCF Soccer, Track and Field, and Cross Country
John Euliano Park	3,900	2001	University of Central Florida	UCF Baseball
Addition Financial Arena	9,465	2006	University of Central Florida	UCF Basketball, Orlando Valkyries
The Venue at UCF	2,500	1990	University of Central Florida	UCF Volleyball
UCF Softball Complex	600	2002	University of Central Florida	UCF Softball
Kia Center	20,000	2010	City of Orlando	Orlando Magic, Orlando Solar Bears, Orlando Predators
Inter.co Stadium	25,500	2017	Orlando City SC	Orlando City SC, Orlando Pride, Orlando Storm
Camping World Stadium	60,219	1936	City of Orlando	Several bowl and rivalry games
ESPN Wide World of Sports Complex	8,000	1997	Disney Experiences	Used for sports tourism

== Defunct or relocated teams ==
Club	Sport	League	Venue	First Year in Orlando	Last Year in Orlando	Fate	Titles
Orlando Panthers	American Football	COFL	Tangerine Bowl	1965	1971	Folded	2
Florida Blazers	American Football	WFL	Florida Citrus Bowl	1974	1974	Relocated to San Antonio	
Orlando Renegades	American Football	USFL	Florida Citrus Bowl	1983	1985	League Folded	
Orlando Lions	Soccer	ASL	Florida Citrus Bowl	1985	1996	Merged with Fort Lauderdale Strikers	
Orlando Predators	Indoor Football	AFL	Amway Arena	1991	2016	Folded	
Orlando Thunder	American Football	WLAF	Florida Citrus Bowl	1991	1992	Folded	
Orlando Solar Bears	Ice Hockey	IHL	Orlando Arena	1995	2001	Folded	
Orlando Sundogs	Soccer	USISL A-League	Florida Citrus Bowl	1997	1997	Folded	
Orlando Apollos	American Football	AAF	Spectrum Stadium	2018	2019	League Folded	1
Orlando Guardians	American Football	XFL	Camping World Stadium	2023	2023	Did not make merger with USFL	

In 2000, the Orlando Rays moved from Tinker Field to Cracker Jack Stadium at the Wide World of Sports Complex. The Rays drew poorly at Disney and moved to Montgomery, Alabama, for the 2004 season. The Disney stadium has been mostly empty ever since.

The Women's National Basketball Association's Orlando Miracle played four seasons at Amway Arena (1999–2002). After 2002, when owners were permitted to sell their WNBA teams, the Miracle were purchased by Mohegan Sun casino and moved to become the Connecticut Sun. The semi-professional Orlando Aces played one season in the new revived American Basketball Association in 2006–07 before moving to Las Vegas.

The Orlando Titans of the National Lacrosse League moved to the city from New York City for the 2010 season. They folded after the season ended.

=== American football ===
Professional football in Orlando in goes back to the 1960s, when the Orlando Panthers played in the minor league Continental Football League. The Panthers won two CPFL titles in 1967 and 1968, but folded with the league after the 1969 season. In 1974, the World Football League was formed, and a franchise originally planned for Boston, then moved to the Washington, D.C. area, wound up in Orlando as the Florida Blazers. Despite playing before sparse crowds at the Citrus Bowl and not getting paid for weeks at a time, the Blazers won their division with a 14–6 record and qualified for the first and only WFL championship game, losing to the Birmingham Americans, 22–21. The franchise was relocated to San Antonio for the 1975 season, then quietly expired with the league in October of that year.

Since then, Orlando has hosted several professional teams in short-lived leagues. In 1985, the United States Football League's Washington Federals shifted to the Citrus Bowl and were renamed the Orlando Renegades. Despite a 5–13 record, the Renegades were one of the eight teams that stayed in the USFL for its projected fall season in 1986, but the league folded before any games were played that year. Next came the Orlando Thunder, a charter team in the World League of American Football in 1991 and 1992. They lost the World Bowl to the Sacramento Surge in 1992. Like all of the other the American-based teams, the franchise was dropped in the World League reorganization of 1995. Then came the Orlando Rage, a member of the XFL who also played at the Citrus Bowl. The Rage had the XFL's best record at 8–2, but were upset in the playoffs, and the XFL folded after the on season. The Citrus Bowl was once slated to host some of the games for the Florida team in the never launched All American Football League in 2008.

Orlando was one of the launch markets for the United Football League (UFL) in 2009. Orlando's team, the Florida Tuskers, was invested in by Stuart Sternberg, principal owner of the Tampa Bay Rays baseball team, and played two of its three home games in the Citrus Bowl, and the third in Tropicana Field in St. Petersburg. They compiled a perfect 6–0 record in the inaugural UFL season, before losing to the Las Vegas Locomotives in the championship game. Before the 2010 season, Sternberg sold his stake in the team and the Tuskers announced they would play all home games in Orlando. Its team was then purchased by Pro Football Hall of Famer Joe Theismann. Before the start of 2011, the Tuskers moved to Norfolk, Virginia, and became the Virginia Destroyers.

The Lingerie Football League, a women's indoor football league now known as the Legends Football League, expanded to Orlando in 2010 with the Orlando Fantasy. They played their home games at the CFE Arena. The inaugural season had a 0–4 record under coach Kenny McEntyre, a former Orlando Predators' defensive specialist. The team folded after the 2012 season, before the league adopted its current name.

The Orlando Apollos began play in 2019 as one of the eight founding members of the Alliance of American Football. The AAF folded before the end of its first season.

The Orlando Guardians played one season in 2023 in the rebooted XFL before folding.

==== Orlando Predators (AFL) ====
The Orlando Predators first played in 1991 in the Arena Football League. The Predators created a rivalry with the Tampa Bay Storm called the War on I-4. The Predators won the ArenaBowl in 1998 and 2000, and also recorded the only shutout in AFL history in 1992.

After the original AFL folded in 2009, the Predators resumed play in 2010 in the revived Arena Football League reconstituted by a group of AFL and af2 franchises. The Predators played at the city-owned Amway Center until 2013, but in September 2013 the city of Orlando notified the Predators it was canceling their lease, because the low attendance numbers of 5,878 were in default of the lease's minimum provisions and because of the team's financial performance. For the 2014 season, the Predators moved to the smaller CFE Arena on the University of Central Florida campus. The team was then purchased by Westgate Resorts owner David Siegel during the 2014 season and the Predators moved back to Amway Center for the 2015 season.

On October 12, 2016, the Orlando Predators announced they had suspended operations due to the reduced number of teams in the AFL and other pending disagreements with the league. In 2019, former Predator Kenny McEntyre launched a new version of the team in the National Arena League.

=== Soccer ===
Minor league soccer has seen varying degrees of success in Orlando. The original Orlando Lions were formed in 1985, and played in the American Soccer League in 1988–90. A second incarnation played in the USISL from 1992 to 1995, winning the regular season title in 1992 and 1993. Orlando made another attempt at pro soccer with the Orlando Sundogs, who played in the USISL A-League in 1997. They finished in the middle of the pack, but suffered poor attendance, and folded after one year. In 2008, Orlando hosted the Orlando Sharks of the Major Indoor Soccer League. After poor performance their first year, plans to shift to the new National Indoor Soccer League were eventually shelved.

=== Ice hockey ===
The Orlando Solar Bears of the International Hockey League were formed in 1995 and were very successful, making the playoffs in each of its six seasons and qualifying for Turner Cup finals twice, losing both times, before finally winning the title in 2001. When the IHL folded after the 2000–01 season, Rich DeVos chose to fold the Solar Bears because his other team, the Grand Rapids Griffins, was moving to the American Hockey League (AHL) along with several other former IHL teams, but the AHL did not permit an individual to own multiple teams. In 2017, the DeVos family eventually purchased the revived Solar Bears that had been playing in the ECHL since 2011.

In 2002, the Atlantic Coast Hockey League was formed with Orlando hosting one of the charter franchises, the Orlando Seals, which won their Commissioner's Cup in 2003; this made Orlando the only Florida city with two hockey championships. The Seals moved to the World Hockey Association 2 in 2003, then the Southern Professional Hockey League in 2004. The City of Orlando revoked their lease for the present Amway Arena, forcing them to sit out the 2004–05 season. They moved to Kissimmee and became the Florida Seals in November 2004. The team resumed play in the 2005–06 season, playing home games at the Silver Spurs Arena, making it to the President's Cup finals before losing to the Knoxville Ice Bears. On January 4, 2007, the Silver Spurs Arena evicted the Seals due to unpaid rent, causing the franchise to fold.

== Other sports ==
Orlando is also the home to the NBA Pre-Draft camp, the NBA's Orlando Summer League, the MLB Winter Meetings, the NFL Annual Meeting, and since 2005, the PSP World Cup paintball tournament. They also host the final event of the extreme sport Dew Tour, the PlayStation Pro. Orlando hosted the Major League Baseball draft for several years until 2009, when they moved to the studios of MLB Network in Secaucus, New Jersey.

The Arnold Palmer Invitational is a PGA Tour tournament held at Bay Hill since 1966.

The Citrus Bowl hosted WWE's WrestleMania XXIV in 2008 and WrestleMania 33 in 2017. Amway Arena played host to WWE's Royal Rumble in 1990 and World Championship Wrestling's Bash at the Beach in 1994, as well as WWE's 2008 Hall of Fame ceremony, headlined by the induction of Ric Flair. The Amway Center has hosted the 2016 Royal Rumble and WWE's 2017 Hall of Fame ceremony. In 2020, WWE began a residency in the Amway Center that included their weekly television tapings and multiple major shows, starting with SummerSlam. Orlando also hosted television tapings for WCW at varying times in the 1990s, both at Disney-MGM Studios and Universal Studios Florida. Impact Wrestling has also held a majority of its shows at Universal Studios. The WWE Performance Center, the official pro wrestling school of WWE, is also located in Orlando. It is the current home venue of WWE's NXT brand. It has also served as the site of WrestleMania 36, several other pay-per-views and numerous WWE television tapings during the COVID-19 pandemic in 2020.

The annual Community Effort Orlando (CEO) is the second biggest fighting game tournament of the country. Having grown exponentially since its introduction in 2010, the event got over 4,000 attendees from more than 25 different countries in 2016. Its Street Fighter tournament has been part of the Capcom Pro Tour since its start in 2014.

In 2020, the remaining games of the 2019-20 NBA season were arranged to be played in the NBA Bubble at the ESPN Wide World of Sports Complex, part of Walt Disney World.

== Famous athletes ==
Many major athletes are from Orlando, such as:

- baseball players: A. J. Pierzynski and Johnny Damon
- American football players: Warren Sapp, Chris Johnson, Brandon Meriweather, Deacon Jones, Brandon Siler, Mike Sims-Walker, Brandon Marshall, Blake Bortles and Ha Ha Clinton-Dix
- basketball players: Chandler Parsons, Amar'e Stoudemire and Darius Washington
- soccer player: Michelle Akers

Orlando is home to many notable athletes former and present, including:

- baseball players: Carlos Peña, Frank Viola, Pedro Feliz and Ken Griffey Jr.
- basketball player: Shaquille O'Neal
- volleyball players: Áurea Cruz, Adora Anae, Shainah Joseph, Wilmarie Rivera
- many golfers, including Tiger Woods and Mark O'Meara. The area's golf professionals reside largely in the Isleworth and Lake Nona neighborhoods.

== See also ==
- Sports in Florida
