= Chad Cabana =

Canadian ice hockey player (born 1974)

- Born: October 1, 1974 (age 51) Bonnyville, Alberta, Canada
- Height: 6 ft 1 in (185 cm)
- Weight: 210 lb (95 kg; 15 st 0 lb)
- Position: Left wing
- Shot: Left
- Played for: AHL; Carolina Monarchs; New Haven Beast; Louisville Panthers; Providence Bruins; CoHL/UHL; Port Huron Border Cats; New Haven Knights; Fort Wayne Komets; WCHL; Colorado Gold Kings; ACHL; Jacksonville Barracudas; WHA2; Miami Manatees
- NHL draft: 213th overall, 1993; Florida Panthers
- Playing career: 1995–2004

Chad Cabana (born October 1, 1974) is a Canadian former professional ice hockey player. He was selected by the Florida Panthers in the ninth round (213th overall) of the 1993 NHL entry draft.

Cabana played four seasons (1991 – 1995) of major junior hockey with the Tri-City Americans of the Western Hockey League, scoring 76 goals and 98 assists for 174 points, while earning 576 penalty minutes, in 260 games played.

He went on to play nine seasons of professional hockey, including 293 games played in the American Hockey League where, between 1995 and 2001, he racked up 75 points and 1,010 penalty minutes.

Cabana retired after the 2003–04 season, during which he skated in 10 contests for the Miami Manatees of the World Hockey Association 2.

== Career statistics ==
			Regular season					Playoffs
Season	Team	League	GP	G	A	Pts	PIM	GP	G	A	Pts	PIM
1991–92	Tri-City Americans	WHL	57	5	8	13	19	4	0	1	1	21
1992–93	Tri-City Americans	WHL	68	19	23	42	104	4	1	0	1	10
1993–94	Tri-City Americans	WHL	67	27	33	60	201	4	2	0	2	24
1994–95	Tri-City Americans	WHL	68	25	34	59	252	17	10	11	21	47
1995–96	Carolina Monarchs	AHL	59	4	9	13	159	—	—	—	—	—
1996–97	Carolina Monarchs	AHL	55	8	5	13	221	—	—	—	—	—
1996–97	Port Huron Border Cats	CoHL	14	7	9	16	49	—	—	—	—	—
1997–98	Beast of New Haven	AHL	34	5	5	10	163	2	0	0	0	7
1997–98	Fort Wayne Komets	IHL	6	0	0	0	22	—	—	—	—	—
1998–99	Beast of New Haven	AHL	66	6	5	11	251	—	—	—	—	—
1999–00	Louisville Panthers	AHL	65	10	17	27	173	4	0	0	0	26
2000–01	Providence Bruins	AHL	14	0	1	1	43	—	—	—	—	—
2000–01	New Haven Knights	UHL	51	9	11	20	207	1	0	0	0	22
2001–02	Colorado Gold Kings	WCHL	66	12	9	21	207	5	1	0	1	4
2002–03	Fort Wayne Komets	UHL	7	1	3	4	56	12	1	6	7	47
2002–03	Jacksonville Barracudas	ACHL	26	9	6	15	41	—	—	—	—	—
2003–04	Miami Manatees	WHA2	10	5	2	7	6	2	1	1	2	15
AHL totals			293	33	42	75	1,010	6	0	0	0	33
