= Robb Stauber =

American ice hockey player and coach

- Born: November 25, 1967 (age 58) Duluth, Minnesota, U.S.
- Height: 5 ft 11 in (180 cm)
- Weight: 180 lb (82 kg; 12 st 12 lb)
- Position: Goaltender
- Caught: Left
- Played for: Los Angeles Kings; Buffalo Sabres
- Coached for: Minnesota Whitecaps
- National team: United States
- NHL draft: 107th overall, 1986; Los Angeles Kings
- Playing career: 1989–2006
- Coaching career: 1999–present

Robert Thomas Stauber (born November 25, 1967) is an American ice hockey coach and former professional goaltender. He played college hockey for the Minnesota Golden Gophers and was drafted in the sixth round of the 1986 NHL entry draft by the Los Angeles Kings of the National Hockey League (NHL). He also played for the Buffalo Sabres.

Following his retirement, he went into coaching, becoming the goaltending coach of the Golden Gophers from 2000 to 2008, as well as for the Minnesota Duluth Bulldogs women's team from 2004 to 2008. He later joined the coaching staff of the United States women's national ice hockey team, where he was the assistant coach at the 2014 Winter Olympics. He was named head coach of the national team, winning the gold medal at the 2017 IIHF Women's World Championship and at the 2018 Winter Olympics. In between his time with the national team, he also coached the Minnesota Whitecaps during the 2015–16 season.

== Playing career ==
A 1986 graduate of Denfeld High School, Stauber was chosen as the 63rd best player in Minnesota boys' high school hockey history. Stauber played three seasons for the Minnesota Golden Gophers men's ice hockey team from 1986 to 1989. He was the first goaltender to win the Hobey Baker Award after his sophomore season in 1988. He was drafted in the sixth round, 107th overall, by the Los Angeles Kings in the 1986 NHL entry draft.

Stauber made his debut with the Kings during the 1989–90 season, appearing in two games. After two years in the minors, he played in 53 games for Kings between the 1992–93 and 1993–94 seasons. He was traded (along with Alexei Zhitnik, Charlie Huddy, and a draft pick) to the Buffalo Sabres (for Grant Fuhr, Denis Tsygurov, and Philippe Boucher) during the 1994–95 season. Stauber appeared in just one game with the Kings and six games with the Sabres in that season, his last in the NHL. His career NHL stats are 21-23-9 W-L-T, 3.81 GAA, .890 save percentage, and one shutout in 62 games.

Stauber spent 1995 to 1999 in the AHL and IHL. From 2002 to 2006, he played a few games in three different seasons with the Jacksonville Barracudas in three different leagues, the Atlantic Coast Hockey League, WHA2, and Southern Professional Hockey League. In 1996, he scored a goal while playing for the Rochester Americans.

== Coaching career ==
Initially hired as a volunteer coach in 1999, Stauber coached at the University of Minnesota's Gophers men's hockey program as their goaltending coach from 2000 to 2008, during which the Gophers won back to back NCAA National Titles in 2002 and 2003.

Stauber joined the USA Hockey program in 2010, where he was involved with the United States women's national ice hockey team. He was an assistant coach at the 2014 Winter Olympics. In the first tournament after he was named permanent head coach, he coached the team to a gold medal at the 2017 IIHF Women's World Championship. The next year, he coached the team to a gold medal at the 2018 Winter Olympics, their first gold medal since 1998. He was succeeded by Bob Corkum in October 2018.

== Bandy career ==
Stauber also played bandy with the Dynamo Duluth. He was selected to the United States national team for the 2010 World Championship.

== Personal life ==
Stauber has four children from two marriages. His son Jaxson is a current goaltender in the NHL. His brother Pete Stauber is a former minor league hockey player and in 2018 was elected US Representative from Minnesota's 8th district.

== Career statistics ==
=== Regular season and playoffs ===
			Regular season									Playoffs
Season	Team	League	GP	W	L	T	MIN	GA	SO	GAA	SV%	GP	W	L	MIN	GA	SO	GAA	SV%
1983–84	Denfeld High School	HS-MN	—	—	—	—	—	—	—	—	—	—	—	—	—	—	—	—	—
1984–85	Denfeld High School	HS-MN	22	—	—	—	990	27	0	1.70	—	—	—	—	—	—	—	—	—
1985–86	Denfeld High School	HS-MN	27	—	—	—	1215	66	0	3.26	—	—	—	—	—	—	—	—	—
1986–87	University of Minnesota	WCHA	20	13	5	0	1072	63	0	3.53	.881	—	—	—	—	—	—	—	—
1987–88	University of Minnesota	WCHA	44	34	10	0	2621	119	5	2.72	.913	—	—	—	—	—	—	—	—
1988–89	University of Minnesota	WCHA	34	26	8	0	2024	82	0	2.43	.911	—	—	—	—	—	—	—	—
1989–90	Los Angeles Kings	NHL	2	0	1	0	83	11	0	7.94	.744	—	—	—	—	—	—	—	—
1989–90	New Haven Nighthawks	AHL	14	6	6	2	851	43	0	3.03	.899	5	2	3	302	24	0	4.77	—
1990–91	New Haven Nighthawks	AHL	33	13	16	4	1882	115	1	3.67	.875	—	—	—	—	—	—	—	—
1990–91	Phoenix Roadrunners	IHL	4	1	2	0	160	11	0	4.13	—	—	—	—	—	—	—	—	—
1991–92	Phoenix Roadrunners	IHL	22	8	12	1	1242	80	0	3.86	—	—	—	—	—	—	—	—	—
1992–93	Los Angeles Kings	NHL	31	15	8	4	1735	111	0	3.84	.888	4	3	1	240	16	0	4.00	.898
1993–94	Los Angeles Kings	NHL	22	4	11	5	1144	65	1	3.41	.908	—	—	—	—	—	—	—	—
1993–94	Phoenix Roadrunners	IHL	3	1	1	0	121	13	0	6.42	.843	—	—	—	—	—	—	—	—
1994–95	Los Angeles Kings	NHL	1	0	0	0	16	2	0	7.33	.667	—	—	—	—	—	—	—	—
1994–95	Buffalo Sabres	NHL	6	2	3	0	317	20	0	3.79	.867	—	—	—	—	—	—	—	—
1995–96	Rochester Americans	AHL	16	6	7	1	833	49	0	3.53	.896	—	—	—	—	—	—	—	—
1996–97	Portland Pirates	AHL	30	13	13	2	1606	82	0	3.06	.897	—	—	—	—	—	—	—	—
1997–98	Hartford Wolf Pack	AHL	39	20	10	6	2221	89	2	2.40	.920	7	3	4	419	30	0	4.29	.873
1998–99	Manitoba Moose	IHL	5	2	1	1	213	17	0	4.79	.811	—	—	—	—	—	—	—	—
2002–03	Jacksonville Barracudas	ACHL	3	—	—	—	—	—	—	4.38	.891	—	—	—	—	—	—	—	—
2003–04	Jacksonville Barracudas	WHA2	2	—	—	—	—	—	—	2.50	.924	—	—	—	—	—	—	—	—
2005–06	Jacksonville Barracudas	SPHL	3	2	1	—	—	—	—	2.63	.933	—	—	—	—	—	—	—	—
AHL totals			132	58	52	15	6643	378	3	3.41	.898	12	5	7	721	54	0	4.49	—
NHL totals			62	21	23	9	3295	209	1	3.81	.890	4	3	1	240	16	0	4.00	.898

=== International ===
Year	Team	Event	GP	W	L	T	MIN	GA	SO	GAA	SV%
1987	United States	WJC	4	—	—	—	220	17	0	4.64
1989	United States	WC	6	3	3	0	313	19	0	3.64	—
Junior totals			4	—	—	—	220	17	0	4.64	—
Senior totals			6	3	3	0	313	19	0	3.64	—

== Awards and honors ==
Award	Year
Hobey Baker Award	1987–88
WCHA Player of the Year	1987–88
AHCA West First-Team All-American	1987–88
All-WCHA First Team	1987–88
John Mariucci MVP Award (Minnesota)	1987–88
All-WCHA Second Team	1988–89

Awards and achievements
Preceded by Tony Hrkac	WCHA Most Valuable Player; 1987–88	Succeeded by Curtis Joseph
Preceded by Tony Hrkac	Winner of the Hobey Baker Award; 1987–88	Succeeded by Lane MacDonald
