= Miami Manatees =

Ice hockey team

Miami Manatees
| Founded | 2003 |
| Home ice | Miami Arena |
| Based in | Miami, Florida |
| Colors | Forest Green, Gold, Black, Grey |
| League | 2003 - 2004: WHA2 |
| Head coach | Zac Boyer |
| General manager | Shawn Thorimbert |
| Owner | David Waronker |

The Miami Manatees were a minor league ice hockey team in the World Hockey Association 2.

The Manatees originally played their home games at Miami Arena; however, owner David Waronker had an out clause in the team's lease that stated that if the team's attendance average was under 1,500 after 20 of 32 homes games, the Manatees could play their home games elsewhere. This would prove to be the case, as recorded attendance was well below the mark for most home games; one contest against the Lakeland Loggerheads drew an estimated attendance of only 250 fans. After this, Waronker wanted to move the team to Maitland, FL to play in the RDV Sportsplex, but the players shot down this idea; then the Manatees' ownership decided to play only away games. The players liked this idea even less and several left to play for other teams, mostly in the South East Hockey League while others tried to catch on with ECHL squads. With the few remaining players, the Manatees wound up playing only 48 regular-season games, but still qualified for the playoffs (see below).

The play-by-play voice of the Manatees was Mark Fischel, with color analyst John Daley who was the head coach of the Jr. Manatees ice hockey program, with games carried on IRN.fm internet radio. The Manatees also received limited newspaper coverage in the Miami Herald, and nearby Ft. Lauderdale's Sun-Sentinel.

== Playoffs ==
The Manatees finished the season in 5th place with 53 points in 48 games, an impressive 20 points over the 6th place Lakeland Loggerheads who played 58 games. However, after the Manatees decided to play only road games, the league changed its playoff format to allow the four best win percentages into the playoffs. This turned out to be bad news for the 4th place Orlando Seals; despite finishing with 59 points, or six more than Miami, they did it in 57 games for only a .517 winning percentage, and thus missed the playoffs.

1 - Jacksonville Barracudas (81 pts in 59 games = .686 percentage)
2 - Alabama Slammers (72 pts in 58 games = .621)
3 - Macon Trax (66 pts in 56 games = .589)
4 - Miami Manatees (53 pts in 48 games = .552)

After having their roster severely depleted, the Manatees managed to win one game before losing the best-of-three playoff series with Jacksonville, thus ending their season.

== After 2003-2004 season ==
Following the 2003–04 season, the WHA2 teams jumped ship to the new Southern Professional Hockey League. The Manatees were given permission to suspend operations for the season and attempt to relocate to a new venue, whether in the Miami area or somewhere else. After failing to find another suitable arena, the franchise folded, and there has not been minor league hockey in Miami since.
