= Chris LiPuma =

American ice hockey player

- Born: March 23, 1971 (age 53); Chicago, Illinois, U.S.
- Height: 6 ft 0 in (183 cm)
- Weight: 200 lb (91 kg; 14 st 4 lb)
- Position: Defense
- Shot: Left
- Played for: Tampa Bay Lightning; San Jose Sharks; Orlando Solar Bears; Chicago Wolves; Orlando Seals
- NHL draft: Undrafted
- Playing career: 1992–2004

Christopher Paul LiPuma (born March 23, 1971) is an American former professional ice hockey defenseman.

== Biography ==
LiPuma was born in Chicago, Illinois. As a youth, he played in the 1984 Quebec International Pee-Wee Hockey Tournament with the Chicago Young Americans minor ice hockey team.

LiPuma played 72 games in the National Hockey League: 64 with the Tampa Bay Lightning and eight with the San Jose Sharks.

He is also well known for his play in the International Hockey League.

== Career statistics ==
=== Regular season and playoffs ===
			Regular season					Playoffs
Season	Team	League	GP	G	A	Pts	PIM	GP	G	A	Pts	PIM
1988–89	Kitchener Rangers	OHL	59	7	13	20	101	5	0	1	1	2
1989–90	Kitchener Rangers	OHL	63	11	26	37	125	17	1	4	5	16
1990–91	Kitchener Rangers	OHL	61	6	30	36	145	4	0	1	1	4
1991–92	Kitchener Rangers	OHL	61	13	59	72	115	14	4	9	13	34
1992–93	Atlanta Knights	IHL	66	4	14	18	379	9	1	1	2	35
1992–93	Tampa Bay Lightning	NHL	15	0	5	5	34	—	—	—	—	—
1993–94	Atlanta Knights	IHL	42	2	10	12	254	11	1	1	2	28
1993–94	Tampa Bay Lightning	NHL	27	0	4	4	77	—	—	—	—	—
1994–95	Atlanta Knights	IHL	41	5	12	17	191	—	—	—	—	—
1994–95	Nashville Knights	ECHL	1	0	0	0	0	—	—	—	—	—
1994–95	Tampa Bay Lightning	NHL	1	0	0	0	2	—	—	—	—	—
1995–96	Atlanta Knights	IHL	48	5	11	16	146	—	—	—	—	—
1995–96	Tampa Bay Lightning	NHL	21	0	0	0	13	—	—	—	—	—
1996–97	Kentucky Thoroughblades	AHL	48	6	17	23	93	4	0	3	3	6
1996–97	San Jose Sharks	NHL	8	0	0	22	—	—	—	—	—
1997–98	Orlando Solar Bears	IHL	13	1	4	5	63	—	—	—	—	—
1997–98	San Antonio Dragons	IHL	60	1	10	11	116	—	—	—	—	—
1998–99	Chicago Wolves	IHL	34	0	10	10	186	—	—	—	—	—
1999–00	Chicago Wolves	IHL	42	0	4	4	98	5	0	0	0	8
2000–01	Chicago Wolves	IHL	64	2	5	7	184	2	0	0	0	8
2001–02	Baton Rouge Kingfish	ECHL	70	3	31	34	228	—	—	—	—	—
2002–03	Orlando Seals	ACHL	51	10	21	31	263	6	0	1	1	6
2003–04	Orlando Seals	WHA2	30	1	14	15	112	—	—	—	—	—
IHL totals			410	20	80	100	1617	27	2	2	4	79
NHL totals			72	0	9	9	146	—	—	—	—	—
