= Benoit Cotnoir =

Canadian ice hockey player

- Born: July 10, 1975 (age 51) Rouyn-Noranda, Quebec, Canada
- Height: 6 ft 1 in (185 cm)
- Weight: 185 lb (84 kg; 13 st 3 lb)
- Position: Defenseman
- Shot: Right
- Played for: Mobile Mysticks; Richmond Renegades; Basingstoke Bison; Pont-Rouge Caron & Guay; Augusta Lynx; Macon Trax
- Playing career: 1995–2004

Benoit Cotnoir is a Canadian former ice hockey defenseman who was an All-American for Notre Dame.

== Career ==
Cotnoir began his tenure with the ice hockey team at Notre Dame in 1995. In his first two years he proved to be a steady defender for a bad team. The fortunes of the Fighting Irish changed in his junior season and Cotnoir benefitted by nearly doubling his point production. As a senior he helped the team post its first winning season in 9 years and was named an All-American. While his numbers were never eye-popping, Cotnoir was nevertheless able to carve out a brief career as a professional. He played three years in the ECHL before heading to England in 2002. The trial lasted just 11 games and he finished out the year in Quebec. He spent most of his final year as a player with the Macon Trax in the WHA2.

After his playing career, Cotnoir remained in Georgia and matriculated to Georgia Tech, earning an MBA in 2006. During his studies, he interned with Lafarge, a French industrial company, and then joined their marketing department after graduating. He worked his way up the company ladder and is currently an Area Sales Manager (as of 2021).

== Personal life ==
Benoit's cousin, Pier-Olivier, played college hockey at Norwich.

== Statistics ==
=== Regular season and playoffs ===
			Regular Season					Playoffs
Season	Team	League	GP	G	A	Pts	PIM	GP	G	A	Pts	PIM
1991–92	Abitibi-Témiscamingue Forestiers	QMAAA	41	3	16	19	40	4	0	0	0	2
1992–93	Rouyn-Noranda Capitales	NOJHL	8	0	1	1	10	—	—	—	—	—
1992–93	Rouyn-Noranda Citadelles	QNWJHL	32	9	40	49	56	—	—	—	—	—
1993–94	Le National de Joliette	QJHL	40	19	27	46	60	—	—	—	—	—
1994–95	Weyburn Red Wings	SJHL	53	10	27	37	136	—	—	—	—	—
1995–96	Notre Dame	CCHA	34	6	13	19	64	—	—	—	—	—
1996–97	Notre Dame	CCHA	30	5	10	15	68	—	—	—	—	—
1997–98	Notre Dame	CCHA	41	10	19	29	54	—	—	—	—	—
1998–99	Notre Dame	CCHA	36	7	18	25	58	—	—	—	—	—
1999–00	Mobile Mysticks	ECHL	66	7	21	28	55	5	0	3	3	8
2000–01	Mobile Mysticks	ECHL	20	3	5	8	43	—	—	—	—	—
2001–02	Mobile Mysticks	ECHL	57	2	16	18	38	—	—	—	—	—
2002–03	Basingstoke Bison	BNL	11	0	6	6	30	—	—	—	—	—
2002–03	Pont-Rouge Caron & Guay	QSPHL	16	3	4	7	18	9	2	2	4	0
2003–04	Augusta Lynx	ECHL	2	0	0	0	0	—	—	—	—	—
2003–04	Macon Trax	WHA 2	52	5	25	30	93	4	0	4	4	6
NCAA totals			141	28	60	88	244	—	—	—	—	—
ECHL totals			158	13	44	57	142	5	0	3	3	8

== Awards and honors ==
Award	Year
All-CCHA First Team	1998–99
AHCA East Second-Team All-American	1998–99
