= David Goverde =

Canadian ice hockey player

- Born: April 9, 1970 (age 54); Toronto, Ontario, Canada
- Height: 6 ft 1 in (185 cm)
- Weight: 210 lb (95 kg; 15 st 0 lb)
- Position: Goaltender
- Caught: Left
- Played for: Los Angeles Kings
- NHL draft: 91st overall, 1990; Los Angeles Kings
- Playing career: 1990–2004

David Goverde (born April 9, 1970) is a Canadian former professional ice hockey player.

== Playing career ==
He played 5 games in the National Hockey League with the Los Angeles Kings between 1991 and 1993. The rest of his career, which lasted from 1990 to 2004, was spent in various minor leagues.

Goverde was born in Toronto, Ontario. As a youth, he played in the 1983 Quebec International Pee-Wee Hockey Tournament with the Toronto Young Nationals minor ice hockey team.

== Career statistics ==
=== Regular season and playoffs ===
			Regular season									Playoffs
Season	Team	League	GP	W	L	T	MIN	GA	SO	GAA	SV%	GP	W	L	MIN	GA	SO	GAA	SV%
1986–87	North York Rangers	GTHL	21	—	—	—	672	47	3	2.24	—	—	—	—	—	—	—	—	—
1987–88	Windsor Compuware Spitfires	OHL	10	5	3	1	471	28	0	3.57	—	—	—	—	—	—	—	—	—
1988–89	Windsor Spitfires	OHL	5	0	3	0	221	24	0	6.52	—	—	—	—	—	—	—	—	—
1988–89	Sudbury Wolves	OHL	39	16	15	4	2189	156	0	4.28	—	—	—	—	—	—	—	—	—
1989–90	Sudbury Wolves	OHL	52	28	12	7	2941	182	0	3.71	.894	7	3	3	394	25	0	3.81	—
1990–91	Phoenix Roadrunners	IHL	40	11	19	5	2007	137	0	4.10	—	—	—	—	—	—	—	—	—
1991–92	Los Angeles Kings	NHL	2	1	1	0	120	9	0	4.50	.857	—	—	—	—	—	—	—	—
1991–92	Phoenix Roadrunners	IHL	36	11	19	3	1951	129	1	3.97	.904	—	—	—	—	—	—	—	—
1991–92	New Haven Nighthawks	AHL	5	1	3	0	248	17	0	4.11	.896	—	—	—	—	—	—	—	—
1992–93	Los Angeles Kings	NHL	2	0	2	0	99	13	0	7.94	.745	—	—	—	—	—	—	—	—
1992–93	Phoenix Roadrunners	IHL	45	18	21	3	2569	173	1	4.04	.887	—	—	—	—	—	—	—	—
1993–94	Los Angeles Kings	NHL	1	0	1	0	60	7	0	7.00	.811	—	—	—	—	—	—	—	—
1993–94	Phoenix Roadrunners	IHL	30	15	13	1	1716	93	0	3.25	.904	—	—	—	—	—	—	—	—
1993–94	Portland Pirates	AHL	1	0	1	0	59	4	0	4.01	.871	—	—	—	—	—	—	—	—
1993–94	Peoria Rivermen	IHL	5	4	1	0	299	13	0	2.61	.919	1	0	1	59	7	0	7.05	.731
1994–95	Detroit Falcons	CoHL	4	4	0	0	240	10	0	2.50	.924	—	—	—	—	—	—	—	—
1994–95	Phoenix Roadrunners	IHL	2	0	2	0	76	5	0	3.95	.861	—	—	—	—	—	—	—	—
1994–95	Detroit Vipers	IHL	15	8	5	0	814	49	0	3.61	.864	—	—	—	—	—	—	—	—
1995–96	Saint John Sea Dogs	AHL	1	0	0	0	47	9	0	11.49	.750	—	—	—	—	—	—	—	—
1995–96	Louisville Riverfrogs	ECHL	12	5	5	1	697	46	1	3.96	.879	—	—	—	—	—	—	—	—
1995–96	Toledo Storm	ECHL	31	23	3	4	1817	79	1	2.61	.916	11	8	3	666	32	0	2.88	.924
1996–97	Fort Wayne Komets	IHL	1	0	1	0	60	7	0	7.00	.870	—	—	—	—	—	—	—	—
1996–97	Toledo Storm	ECHL	44	23	14	6	2554	126	5	2.96	.915	5	2	3	346	15	0	2.59	—
1997–98	Phoenix Mustangs	WCHL	53	30	21	2	3149	178	2	3.39	.896	9	3	5	492	38	0	4.63	.856
1998–99	Phoenix Mustangs	WCHL	58	26	25	6	3378	211	2	3.75	.889	3	1	2	179	11	0	3.69	.919
1999–00	Phoenix Mustangs	WCHL	55	24	27	3	3175	186	2	3.52	.893	12	10	2	750	29	2	2.32	.931
2000–01	Phoenix Mustangs	WCHL	41	11	29	1	2279	178	2	4.69	.876	—	—	—	—	—	—	—	—
2001–02	Tacoma Sabercats	WCHL	28	12	11	2	1516	96	0	3.80	.892	9	5	4	544	23	0	2.54	.927
2002–03	Orlando Seals	ACHL	43	30	12	0	2509	111	4	2.65	.907	5	5	0	318	5	1	0.94	.962
2003–04	Orlando Seals	WHA2	43	20	17	3	2444	132	1	3.24	.905	—	—	—	—	—	—	—	—
NHL totals			5	1	4	0	279	29	0	6.25	.808	—	—	—	—	—	—	—	—
