= Macon Coliseum =

Arena in Macon, Georgia

Coordinates: 32°50′31″N 83°37′11″W

- Interior of arena (c.2007)

- Location within Georgia Location within the United States
- Full name: Macon Centreplex Coliseum Arena
- Address: 200 Coliseum Dr; Macon, GA 31217-3806
- Location: Macon Centreplex
- Owner: City of Macon
- Operator: Spectra
- Capacity: 9,000 Detailed capacity: Basketball: 9,252; Hockey/Arena football: 7,182; End stage 180°: 7,418; End stage 270°: 8,024; End stage 360°: 8,438; Theatre: 1,750

Construction
- Opened: October 30, 1968
- Renovated: 1996; 2015

Tenants
- Macon Whoopees (SHL) (1973-74); Macon Whoopee (CHL) (1996-2001); Macon Whoopee (ECHL) (2001-02); Macon Knights (af2) (2001-06); Macon Trax (ACHL/WHA2/SPHL) (2002-05); Macon Blaze (WBA) (2005); Macon Steel (AIF) (2012); Macon Mayhem (SPHL) (2015-present); Georgia Doom (AAL) (2018–19)

Website
- Venue Website

The Macon Coliseum is a multi-purpose arena in Macon, Georgia, United States. It is home to the Macon Mayhem, a minor-league hockey team in the SPHL. The Centerplex was home to the Macon Whoopee (ECHL), Macon Whoopee (CHL) and Macon Trax ice hockey teams and the Macon Knights arena football team. It seats 7,182 for hockey and arena football and up to 9,252 for concerts.

== History ==
Macon Centreplex was built in 1968 as the first facility of its size and kind in the state. Mayor Ronnie Thompson was among its most influential backers. Thompson, who served from 1967 to 1975, blocked an appearance at the facility by the boxer Muhammad Ali because the mayor objected to Ali's Conscientious Objector status during the Vietnam War.

The Centreplex quickly became Central Georgia's premier sports, entertainment and trade show venue, with concerts by well-known performers such as Elvis Presley. Presley performed at the centreplex on April 15, 1972, afternoon show and evening show, April 24, 1975, August 31, 1976, and June 1, 1977. Many others have performed here, including Led Zeppelin, the Allman Brothers Band, Kiss, Van Halen, Jethro Tull, James Brown, War, Jackson 5, Jeffrey Osborne, Earth, Wind, and Fire, The Emotions, Bar Kays, Parliament/Funkadelic, The Temptations, OJays, Chicago, Leon Russell, Aerosmith, Rick James, Prince, The Time, Vanity 6, George Jones, Reba McEntire, Kenny Rogers, Hank Williams Jr., Red Hot Chili Peppers, Sarah McLachlan, Billy Joel, Katy Perry, Elton John and many others. R.E.M. filmed part of its first concert film Tourfilm here on November 11, 1989.

Professional wrestling often comes to the Centreplex. World Championship Wrestling (WCW) was a frequent visitor of the Centreplex, holding multiple television tapings and non-televised house shows all throughout the 90s. WCW's supercard Clash of the Champions XXI aired live from the Centreplex on TBS on November 18, 1992. The show featured Ricky Steamboat & Shane Douglas winning the unified WCW World Tag Team Championship and NWA World Tag Team Championship from Barry Windham & Dustin Rhodes. Windham turned heel on Rhodes after the match.

WCW Monday Nitro, WCW's flagship weekly live television show that aired on TNT, emanated from the Centreplex a few times:

— November 20, 1995 (notable for featuring the first one-on-one match in history between Hulk Hogan and Sting)

— May 27, 1996 (notable for being the first two-hour episode of the show and Scott Hall's debut in WCW, beginning the New World Order storyline)

— December 23, 1996

— June 23, 1997

— December 22, 1997 (notable for being the first and only episode of "nWo Monday Nitro")

WWE also visits the Centreplex. On January 28, 1991, the company (then called the World Wrestling Federation or "WWF") held their 5th and final episode of The Main Event V, which aired nationally on NBC on February 1, 1991. The show featured the announcement that Hulk Hogan would face WWF Champion Sgt. Slaughter at WrestleMania VII for the title. The WWF also taped matches and segments for their syndicated shows, which featured the debut of Paul Bearer as the manager of The Undertaker. Their flagship weekly live television show, Monday Night Raw, aired live from the Centreplex on February 20, 1995, and featured the return of Sycho Sid to the WWF for the first time in almost 3 years. The following two episodes on February 27, 1995, and March 6, 1995, also featured taped matches from the Centreplex. As of 2017, WWE still holds house shows in the Centreplex about twice a year.

Total Nonstop Action Wrestling (TNA) also held a television taping for their weekly flagship show, Impact Wrestling, on October 27, 2011, at the Centreplex. The shows aired on Spike on November 3, 2011, and November 10, 2011.

Donald Trump held a nationally televised campaign rally at the Centreplex on October 16, 2015, during his first United States Presidential campaign.

The arena underwent major renovations in 1996 including the addition of the Edgar H. Wilson Convention Centre, which hosts conventions, trade shows and banquets. Three luxury suites were added in 2003 and the Centreplex's exterior redone, resulting in the addition of a giant "M" at the main entrance on the arena.

=== Replacement ===
In June 2025, the Macon–Bibb County Commission approved a contract with MFA Program Management to plan and oversee the construction of a new sports arena. Gary Wheat, president and CEO of Visit Macon, said the Macon Coliseum is an aging facility that lacks the seating and features to accommodate the type of events the city is looking to attract, and other Georgia cities have invested in new state-of-the-art venues, with Savannah opening Enmarket Arena in 2022, Athens opening the Akins Ford Arena in 2024, and the New Augusta Arena under construction at the site of the former James Brown Arena. The new arena is planned to be built adjacent to the existing Macon Coliseum, with the existing arena continuing to operate while the new facility is under construction. The new arena is planned to be financed in part from a $450 million, ten-year special-purpose local-option sales tax.

== In film ==
The Macon Coliseum portrayed the Olympic Ice Hall in Albertville, France and the CC Amfi in Hamar, Norway in the film I, Tonya.

Preceded by The Spectrum; Philadelphia	FIBA Intercontinental Cup; Final Venue; 1969	Succeeded by Palazzo dello Sport Lino Oldrini; Varese
