= 2004–05 SPHL season =

- League: Southern Professional Hockey League
- Sport: Ice hockey
- Duration: October 29, 2004–April 1, 2005

Regular season
- Season champions: Knoxville Ice Bears
- Season MVP: Kevin Swider (Knoxville)
- Top scorer: Kevin Swider (Knoxville)

Playoffs
- Finals champions: Columbus Cottonmouths
- Finals runners-up: Macon Trax

SPHL seasons
- 2005–06 →

The 2004–05 Southern Professional Hockey League season was the first season of the Southern Professional Hockey League. The regular season began October 29, 2004, and ended April 1, 2005, after a 56-game regular season and a six-team playoff. The Columbus Cottonmouths won the first SPHL championship.

== Teams ==
2004-05 Southern Professional Hockey League
Team	City	Arena
Asheville Aces	Asheville, North Carolina	Asheville Civic Center
Columbus Cottonmouths	Columbus, Georgia	Columbus Civic Center
Fayetteville FireAntz	Fayetteville, North Carolina	Cumberland County Crown Coliseum
Huntsville Havoc	Huntsville, Alabama	Von Braun Center
Jacksonville Barracudas	Jacksonville, Florida	Jacksonville Veterans Memorial Arena
Knoxville Ice Bears	Knoxville, Tennessee	Knoxville Civic Auditorium and Coliseum
Macon Trax	Macon, Georgia	Macon Coliseum
Winston-Salem Polar Twins	Winston-Salem, North Carolina	LJVM Coliseum Annex

== Map of teams ==
SPHL teams

== Regular season ==
=== Final standings ===
Team	GP	W	L	GF	GA	Pts
Knoxville Ice Bears^{‡}	56	34	22	235	185	68
Macon Trax	56	33	23	220	199	66
Jacksonville Barracudas	56	33	23	230	195	66
Fayetteville FireAntz	56	32	24	226	158	64
Columbus Cottonmouths	56	30	26	224	200	60
Huntsville Havoc	56	29	27	183	181	58
Asheville Aces	56	19	37	182	256	38
Winston-Salem Polar Twins	56	14	42	147	300	28

^{‡} Commissioner's Cup winners
Advanced to playoffs

=== Attendance ===
Team	Total	Games	Average
Knoxville	93,564	28	3,341
Fayetteville	85,744	28	3,062
Huntsville	75,978	28	2,713
Columbus	73,063	28	2,609
Jacksonville	63,542	28	2,269
Asheville	59,901	28	2,139
Macon	53,082	28	1,895
Winston-Salem	41,816	28	1,493

== President's Cup playoffs ==
Quarterfinals
5	Columbus Cottonmouths	4
4	Fayetteville FireAntz	2
3	Jacksonville Barracudas	2
6	Huntsville Havoc	1

Semifinals
1	Knoxville Ice Bears	2	2	–
5	Columbus Cottonmouths	4	3	–
2	Macon Trax	2	3	7
3	Jacksonville Barracudas	1	4	1

Finals
5	Columbus Cottonmouths	5	3	–
2	Macon Trax	1	2	–

=== Quarterfinals ===
Note: game-winning goal scorer indicated in italics

==== (1) Knoxville Ice Bears and (2) Macon Trax ====
The Knoxville Ice Bears and the Macon trax get byes for the Quarter Finals round of the playoffs. The teams will be reseeded for the Simi Finals round.

==== (3) Jacksonville Barracudas vs. (6) Huntsville Havoc ====
Game-by-Game		Score	Jacksonville goals	Huntsville goals	Winning goalie
1	March 23	at Jacksonville 2, Huntsville 1	Brad Federenko, Jason Silverthron	Jeff Dams	Kelly Shields
Jacksonville win series 1–0					

==== (4) Fayetteville FireAntz vs. (5) Columbus Cottonmouths ====
Game-by-Game		Score	Fayetteville goals	Columbus goals	Winning goalie
1	March 23	at Fayetteville 2, Columbus 4	Chad Peck, George Nistas	Ryan Haggarty, Tylor Keller, Daryl Moor, Tim Green	Chad Rycroft
Columbus win series 1–0					

=== Semifinals ===
Note: game-winning goal scorer indicated in italics

==== (1) Knoxville Ice Bears vs. (5) Columbus Cottonmouths ====
Game-by-Game		Score	Knoxville goals	Columbus goals	Winning goalie
1	March 25	at Knoxville 2, Columbus 4	David Bagley, Doug Searle	Orrin Hergott, Tylor Keller, Ryan Haggarty 2	Chad Rycroft
2	March 27	at Columbus 3, Knoxville 2	Chris Bodnar, Craig Desjarlais	Craig Stahl 2, Orrin Hergott	Chad Rycroft
Columbus win series 2–0				Hergott 2, Haggarty 2, Stahl 2	

==== (2) Macon Trax vs. (3) Jacksonville Barracudas ====
Game-by-Game		Score	Macon goals	Jacksonville goals	Winning goalie
1	March 25	at Jacksonville 1, Macon 2	Craig Miller, Casey Handrahan	Jason Silverthorn	Mark Cairns
2	March 26	at Macon 3, Jacksonville 4	John Gurskis 2, Steve Zoryk	Joe Koslakiewicz 2, Brad Federenko 2	Kelly Shields
3	March 27	at Macon 7, Jacksonville 1	Edan Welch, Ryan Rivard, Steve Zoryk 2, Lou Dimasi, Mark Allen, David Deeves	Brent Rumble	Kelly Shields
Macon win series 2–1			Zork 3,	Koslakiewicz 2, Federenko 2	

=== Finals ===
March 31, 2005; 7:35 pm	Columbus	5–1	Macon	Macon Centreplex, Macon, GA; Attendance: 1,997

Game reference

Chad Rycroft
Goalies
Mark Cairns
Referee:
Jon Mattson

Misita (Keller, Aikia) (SH) – 05:12	1 – 0
Keller (Green, Underwood) (PP) – 07:17	2 – 0
	2 – 1	18:17 – Miller (Welch, Deeves)
Moor (Stahl) – 29:47	3 – 1
Misita (Keller, Aikia) (PP) – 35:48	4 – 1
Green (Keller, Aikia) (PP) – 40:48	5 – 1

23 min
Penalties
25 min
44
Shots
33

April 1, 2005; 7:30 pm	Macon	2 – 3 (OT)	Columbus	Columbus Civic Center, Columbus, GA; Attendance: 4,579

Game reference

Mark Cairns
Goalies
Chad Rycroft
Referee:
Jon Mattson

	0 – 1	18:45 – Green (Keller) (PP)
Welch (Gurskis) – 34:22	1 – 1
Deeves (Miller) – 44:48	2 – 1
	2 – 2	58:59 – Green (Keller)
	2 – 3	63:55 – Keller (Green)

18 min
Penalties
18 min
30
Shots
34

== Awards ==
The Coach of the Year award was announced on March 21, 2005, followed by the All-Star team on March 22, Goalie of the Year on March 23, Defenseman of the Year on March 24, and MVP and Rookie of the Year on March 25.

President's Cup:	Columbus Cottonmouths
Commissioner's Cup:	Knoxville Ice Bears
League MVP:	Kevin Swider (Knoxville)
Rookie of the Year:	Chad Collins (Fayetteville)
Defenseman of the Year:	Curtis Menzul (Knoxville)
Goalie of the Year:	Chad Collins (Fayetteville)
Coach of the Year:	Derek Booth (Fayetteville)

=== All-Star selections ===
All-Stars

(Canada) F Brent Rumble (Jacksonville)
(United States) F Kevin Swider (Knoxville)
(Canada) F K.J. Vorhees (Knoxville)
(Canada) D Ryan Aikia (Columbus)
(Canada) D Curtis Menzul (Knoxville)
(Canada) G Chad Collins (Fayetteville)
