= ACHL =

ACHL may refer to:

- Atlantic Coast Hockey League (1981–87)
- Atlantic Coast Hockey League (2002–03)
- Appellate Committee of the House of Lords in the UK; see Judicial functions of the House of Lords
