= Rick Allain =

Canadian ice hockey coach

- Born: May 20, 1969 (age 56) Guelph, Ontario, Canada
- Height: 6 ft 2 in (188 cm)
- Weight: 215 lb (98 kg; 15 st 5 lb)
- Position: Defence
- Shot: Left
- Played for: Maine Mariners; Providence Bruins
- NHL draft: 164th overall, 1989; Boston Bruins
- Playing career: 1990–1993

Rick Allain (born May 20, 1969) is a Canadian former professional ice hockey player and coach. Allain's coaching career followed three seasons as a defenceman for the Maine Mariners/Providence Bruins franchise in the American Hockey League.

== Coaching career ==
Allain made the transition to coaching in 1997, when he spent a season as assistant coach for the Guelph Storm in the junior-level Ontario Hockey League (OHL). The following season he accepted the head coach position with the Peterborough Petes of the OHL, where he coached for six seasons, 1998–2004. Under his command the Petes had a record of 191–179–38.

In 2004 Allain moved to Florida. In the summer of 2006 he assumed the position of head coach for the Jacksonville Barracudas of the Southern Professional Hockey League, a position he held until the conclusion of the 2007-08 SPHL season, in which the Barracudas requested a one-year suspension from the SPHL due to "not having a suitable venue in for SPHL hockey in North Florida."

Allain was named as Hockey Operations Advisor to the Augusta RiverHawks on April 23, 2010.

== Awards and honours ==
Awards	Year
SPHL Coach of the Year	2007–08
