= Jim Paek =

Korean-Canadian ice hockey player

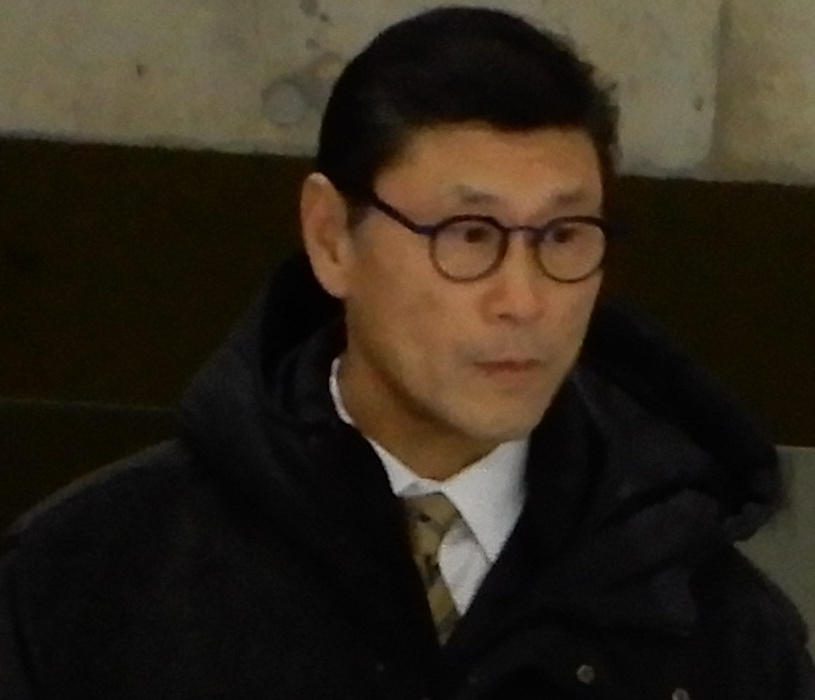
- Paek in 2023
- Born: April 7, 1967 (age 59) Seoul, South Korea
- Height: 6 ft 1 in (185 cm)
- Weight: 195 lb (88 kg; 13 st 13 lb)
- Position: Defence
- Shot: Left
- Played for: Pittsburgh Penguins; Los Angeles Kings; Ottawa Senators
- National team: Canada
- NHL draft: 170th overall, 1985; Pittsburgh Penguins
- Playing career: 1987–2003

Jim Paek (Korean: 백지선, Baek Chi-sun, born April 7, 1967) is a Korean-Canadian former professional ice hockey player, who is currently the director of hockey for the Korea Ice Hockey Association and head coach of the South Korean national team. Paek played in the National Hockey League (NHL) from 1990–91 to 1994–95, and won the Stanley Cup twice, in 1991 and 1992 with the Pittsburgh Penguins. He is both the first Korean-born hockey player to play in the NHL, and to have his name engraved on the Stanley Cup.

== Playing career ==
Paek was the first player of Korean descent to play hockey in the NHL. Paek was drafted by the Pittsburgh Penguins in the ninth round, 170th overall, in the 1985 NHL entry draft. Before joining the NHL in 1990–91, he played three seasons for the Oshawa Generals (1984–85 to 1986–87) of the OHL and three seasons with the Muskegon Lumberjacks (1987–88 to 1989–90) of the IHL. Paek also played 48 games for the Canadian National Team in 1990–91.

Paek's NHL career began with the Penguins in 1990–91. Upon entering the league, he became the first Korean-born hockey player to ever play in the NHL and since he was part of the Penguins' Stanley Cup run of 1990–91, he became the first player of Korean descent to have his name engraved on the Cup. His Penguins sweater now hangs in the Hockey Hall of Fame honouring this feat.

After four seasons and two Stanley Cups in Pittsburgh, Paek was traded mid-season to the Los Angeles Kings in 1993–94 as part of the deal that brought Tomas Sandström to the Penguins. After only 18 regular season games as a King, he moved on, signing with the Ottawa Senators for the 1994–95 NHL season.

After only 29 games with the Ottawa Senators in 1994–95, he left the NHL and began play in the International Hockey League. In the IHL, he played for the Houston Aeros, winning the league championship Turner Cup in 1999, Minnesota Moose, Manitoba Moose, and Cleveland Lumberjacks. His next stop was Great Britain, where he joined the Nottingham Panthers of the British Ice Hockey Superleague. With the exception of 40 games in 2001–02 with the Anchorage Aces of the West Coast Hockey League, he played out the rest of his career with the Panthers, retiring after the 2002–03 season.

In five NHL seasons, Paek played 217 regular season games, recording five goals, and 29 assists. He also racked up 155 penalty minutes. Paek played in 27 playoff games, recording one goal, four assists, and eight penalty minutes.

== Coaching career ==
=== Early career ===
After retiring from play, Paek coached the Orlando Seals of the World Hockey Association 2, guiding the club to a 27–25–5 in 2003–04, and coaching in the league's all-star game.

In 2004, Paek served as an assistant coach for the St. Edward High School, leading the team to an Ohio state championship. While coaching at St. Edward, he also served as a co-coach of the Cleveland Panthers bantam minor squad, leading them to an Eastern Elite Amateur Hockey League title.

=== Grand Rapids Griffins ===
On 11 August 2005, Paek was named the assistant head coach for the Grand Rapids Griffins of the American Hockey League (AHL). Paek helped guide the Griffins to their first Calder Cup in 2013, the American Hockey League's regular season championship in 2005-06, and a cumulative record of 357–272–33–46 (0.560) during his nine seasons. Paek was the longest-tenured coach in franchise history, having served as the assistant coach for nine seasons.

=== International career ===
On July 23, 2014, it was announced that Paek accepted a position as the director of hockey for the Korea Ice Hockey Association (KIHA), and head coach of the South Korean national team. Under Paek's leadership, South Korea earned its first-ever Olympic hockey qualification to the 2018 Winter Olympics, held on home soil in Pyeongchang.

== Personal life ==
Paek was born in Seoul but grew up in Canada after moving there at age one, playing hockey in Toronto. As a youth, he played in the 1980 Quebec International Pee-Wee Hockey Tournament with the Toronto Marlboros minor ice hockey team.

== Career statistics ==
			Regular season					Playoffs
Season	Team	League	GP	G	A	Pts	PIM	GP	G	A	Pts	PIM
1983–84	St. Michael's Buzzers	MetJHL	5	0	2	2	8	—	—	—	—	—
1984–85	Oshawa Generals	OHL	54	2	13	15	57	5	1	0	1	9
1985–86	Oshawa Generals	OHL	64	5	21	26	122	6	0	1	1	9
1986–87	Oshawa Generals	OHL	57	5	17	22	75	26	1	14	15	43
1986–87	Oshawa Generals	MC	—	—	—	—	—	4	1	0	1	4
1987–88	Muskegon Lumberjacks	IHL	82	7	52	59	141	6	0	0	0	29
1988–89	Muskegon Lumberjacks	IHL	80	3	54	57	96	14	1	10	11	24
1989–90	Muskegon Lumberjacks	IHL	81	9	41	50	115	15	1	10	11	41
1990–91	Canada	Intl	48	2	12	14	24	—	—	—	—	—
1990–91	Pittsburgh Penguins	NHL	3	0	0	0	9	8	1	0	1	2
1991–92	Pittsburgh Penguins	NHL	49	1	7	8	36	19	0	4	4	6
1992–93	Pittsburgh Penguins	NHL	77	3	15	18	64	1	0	0	0	0
1993–94	Pittsburgh Penguins	NHL	41	0	4	4	8	—	—	—	—	—
1993–94	Los Angeles Kings	NHL	18	1	1	2	10	—	—	—	—	—
1994–95	Ottawa Senators	NHL	29	0	2	2	28	—	—	—	—	—
1995–96	Houston Aeros	IHL	25	2	5	7	20	—	—	—	—	—
1995–96	Minnesota Moose	IHL	42	1	11	12	54	—	—	—	—	—
1996–97	Manitoba Moose	IHL	9	0	2	2	12	—	—	—	—	—
1996–97	Cleveland Lumberjacks	IHL	74	3	25	28	36	14	0	1	1	2
1997–98	Cleveland Lumberjacks	IHL	75	7	9	16	48	10	2	1	3	4
1998–99	Cleveland Lumberjacks	IHL	65	4	11	15	34	—	—	—	—	—
1998–99	Houston Aeros	IHL	11	0	3	3	2	19	2	4	6	10
1999–2000	Cleveland Lumberjacks	IHL	69	2	20	22	27	9	0	2	2	2
2000–01	Nottingham Panthers	BISL	47	3	21	24	28	6	1	2	3	2
2001–02	Nottingham Panthers	BISL	5	0	0	0	4	6	0	1	1	4
2001–02	Anchorage Aces	WCHL	40	1	28	29	12	—	—	—	—	—
2002–03	Nottingham Panthers	BISL	32	1	10	11	10	17	0	4	4	18
IHL totals			613	38	233	271	585	87	6	28	34	112
NHL totals			217	5	29	34	155	27	1	4	5	8

== Transactions ==
- February 16, 1994 – Traded to Los Angeles by Pittsburgh with Marty McSorley for Tomas Sandstrom and Shawn McEachern.
- June 25, 1994 – Traded to Ottawa by Los Angeles for Ottawa's seventh round choice (Benoit Larose) in 1995 Entry Draft.
- November 25, 1996 – Traded to Houston (IHL) by Manitoba (IHL) for Mike Stevens.
- March, 1999 – Loaned to Houston (IHL) by Cleveland (IHL) for Jason Ruff and future considerations.
- August 4, 2000 – Signed as a free agent by Nottingham Panthers (Britain).
- September 6, 2001 – Signed as a free agent by Anchorage.
