= Amway Arena =

Former indoor arena in Orlando, Florida, United States

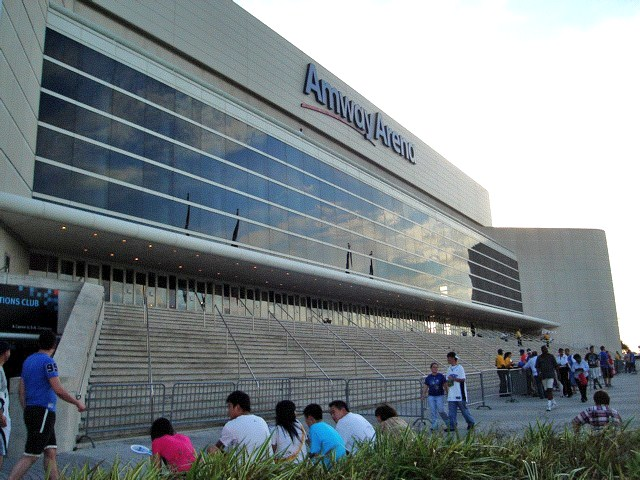
- Amway Arena in April 2010
- Interactive map of Amway Arena
- Former names: Orlando Arena (1989–99); TD Waterhouse Centre (1999–2006)
- Location: 600 West Amelia Street; Orlando, Florida 32801–1107
- Coordinates: 28°32′56″N 81°23′12″W
- Owner: City of Orlando
- Operator: Orlando Venues
- Capacity: Basketball: 15,077 (1989–1991); 15,151 (1991–1993); 15,291 (1993–1994); 16,010 (1994–1995); 17,248 (1995–2002); 17,283 (2002–2006); 17,451 (2006–2007); 17,519 (2007–2008); 17,461 (2008–2010); Professional wrestling: 18,432; Arena football: 15,924; Ice hockey: 15,948; Circus: 15,788; Ice skating: 16,882; Concerts: 17,740 (end stage); 18,039 (center stage)
- Scoreboard: American Sign & Indicator, now Trans-Lux; later Daktronics

Construction
- Groundbreaking: January 5, 1987
- Opened: January 29, 1989
- Closed: September 30, 2010
- Demolished: March 25, 2012
- Cost: US$110 million ($286 million in 2025 dollars)
- Architects: Lloyd Jones Philpot Associates; Cambridge Seven Associates
- Structural engineer: Walter P Moore
- General contractor: Gilbane Building Co.

Tenants
- Orlando Magic (NBA) (1989–2010); Orlando Titans (NLL) (2010); Orlando Predators (AFL) (1991–2010); Orlando Sharks (MISL) (2007–2008); Orlando Miracle (WNBA) (1999–2002); Orlando Solar Bears (IHL) (1995–2001); Orlando Rollergators/Jackals (RHI) (1995–1997); Orlando Seals (ACHL/WHA2) (2002–2004)

Amway Arena (originally known as Orlando Arena and later TD Waterhouse Centre) was a multi-purpose indoor arena located in Orlando, Florida. It was part of the Orlando Centroplex, a sports and entertainment complex located in Downtown Orlando. The arena was the former home of the Orlando Magic of the NBA and the Orlando Titans of the NLL. It was also the home of the Orlando Solar Bears of the International Hockey League, and the Orlando Predators of the Arena Football League. It also hosted many other minor league sports teams, as well as various concerts and other events such as the PlayStation Pro event on the Dew Action Sports Tour and the Ringling Brothers and Barnum and Bailey Circus annually.

Amway Arena closed in 2010 and was demolished in 2012.

== History ==
Orlando Arena's original logo

The city of Orlando wanted a downtown arena long before there was talk of an NBA franchise. The arena site on West Livingston Street was approved in December 1983, at a time when concerts and other large-scale events were held at the Orange County Convention Center, which is several miles away from downtown. Discussions on financing delayed the project for several years due to concerns of the convention center losing money if an arena was built, as an arena would be a better venue for many of the events previously held at the convention center. By the end of 1985, the city and county reached an agreement on a financing plan that would delay the opening of the arena until the end of the decade (unless the county agreed) so it would not compete with the convention center. The planned site grew 50% from its original plan and consumed three extra blocks south of Lake Dot.

In 1986, support was growing to attempt to bring an NBA franchise to Orlando, and general manager Pat Williams knew that having an arena already under construction would be critical for expansion being approved by the league. Considering the importance of the arena, the city voted to allow construction to begin before a study of its impact on the area was filed with state and regional planners. Ground broke in January 1987, four months before the NBA Board of Governors made their final decision to bring Orlando into the league.

Construction was completed in 1989 at a cost of $110 million ($2,099,903.23 as of 2020) – entirely publicly financed. The arena officially opened on January 29, 1989, with a ribbon cutting ceremony and public open house featuring the Orlando Magic Dancers and Curly Neal. In 1991, the facility was voted "Arena of the Year" by Performance Magazine. It was also nominated for "Best Indoor Concert Venue" in the Pollstar Concert Industry Awards. The arena's design provided for an intimate atmosphere. Spectators in the upper bowl were still relatively close to the floor due to the number of seats in the lower and upper bowls being split almost 50/50, with the luxury suites near the ceiling. The arena originally seated 15,291 but all the original seats were replaced with narrower ones between 1994 and 1995, increasing capacity by over 2,000 to 17,519.

=== Naming ===
The logo as TD Waterhouse Centre

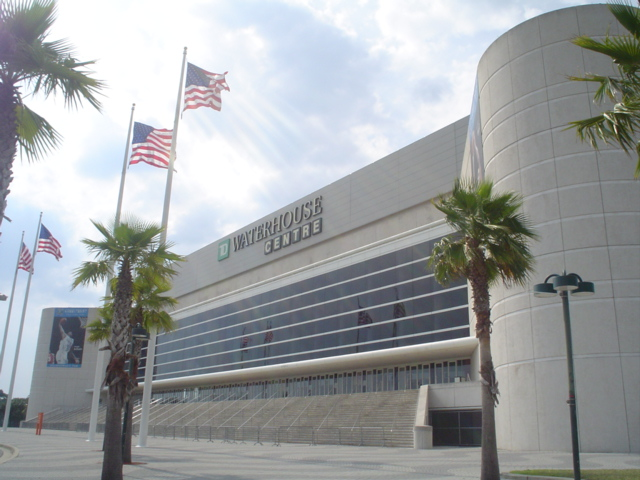
The then TD Waterhouse Centre

During its entire lifetime, the arena was colloquially known by the nickname of "The O-Rena". It was officially named Orlando Arena, then TD Waterhouse Centre, and finally Amway Arena.

After considering several names, including Frederick Arena (suggested by Magic general manager Pat Williams), MagicDome, Quest, Apex and Centrum, then-Orlando Mayor Bill Frederick decided to name the building Orlando Arena in 1988. It was the city's first choice.

The city agreed to allow the Magic to sell the naming rights of the arena in November 1998. It was part of a five-year extension of the team's lease on the building. The search for a corporate sponsor began immediately, and speculation began that Amway would be chosen due to the fact that Magic owner Rich DeVos co-founded it. However, in 1999, TD Waterhouse, a division of Canadian finance company Toronto Dominion, purchased the naming rights at a cost of $7.8 million for five years. The building was then renamed to TD Waterhouse Centre.

The naming rights with TD Waterhouse expired on November 30, 2006, and the financial company which bought TD Waterhouse's U.S. operations earlier in the year chose not to renew them. The venue was briefly known as "The arena in Orlando" before a new naming rights contract was signed, a period of approximately one week. On December 7, 2006, it was announced that Amway would become the new sponsor at a cost of $1.5 million over 4 years, or $375,000 a year, renaming the building as Amway Arena. As part of the deal, Amway received an initial exclusive option to negotiate for the right to name Orlando's new arena, which had just been announced. The new arena would go on to be named Amway Center.

=== Former tenants ===
Defunct tenants of the arena include the IHL's Orlando Solar Bears, the SPHL's Orlando Seals, RHI's Orlando Jackals, MISL's Orlando Sharks, the WNBA's Orlando Miracle, and the NLL's Orlando Titans.

The Solar Bears folded in 2001 along with the IHL itself. After the 2002 WNBA season, all franchises were sold to the operators of the teams, and Magic owner Rich DeVos was not interested in keeping them. They relocated to Connecticut and were renamed the Sun. On August 22, 2004, the City of Orlando evicted the Seals and they were forced to sit out the first season of Southern Professional Hockey League play for 2004–05 as a result. They ultimately moved to Kissimmee's Silver Spurs Arena and resumed play in 2005–2006 as the Florida Seals until they folded. In 2007, the Orlando Sharks, an expansion team in the Major Indoor Soccer League, were to play in the arena beginning that fall, but rent issues with the arena led them to eventually fold. The Orlando Titans played their first and only season at the arena before folding due to financial troubles.

== Renovation plans ==
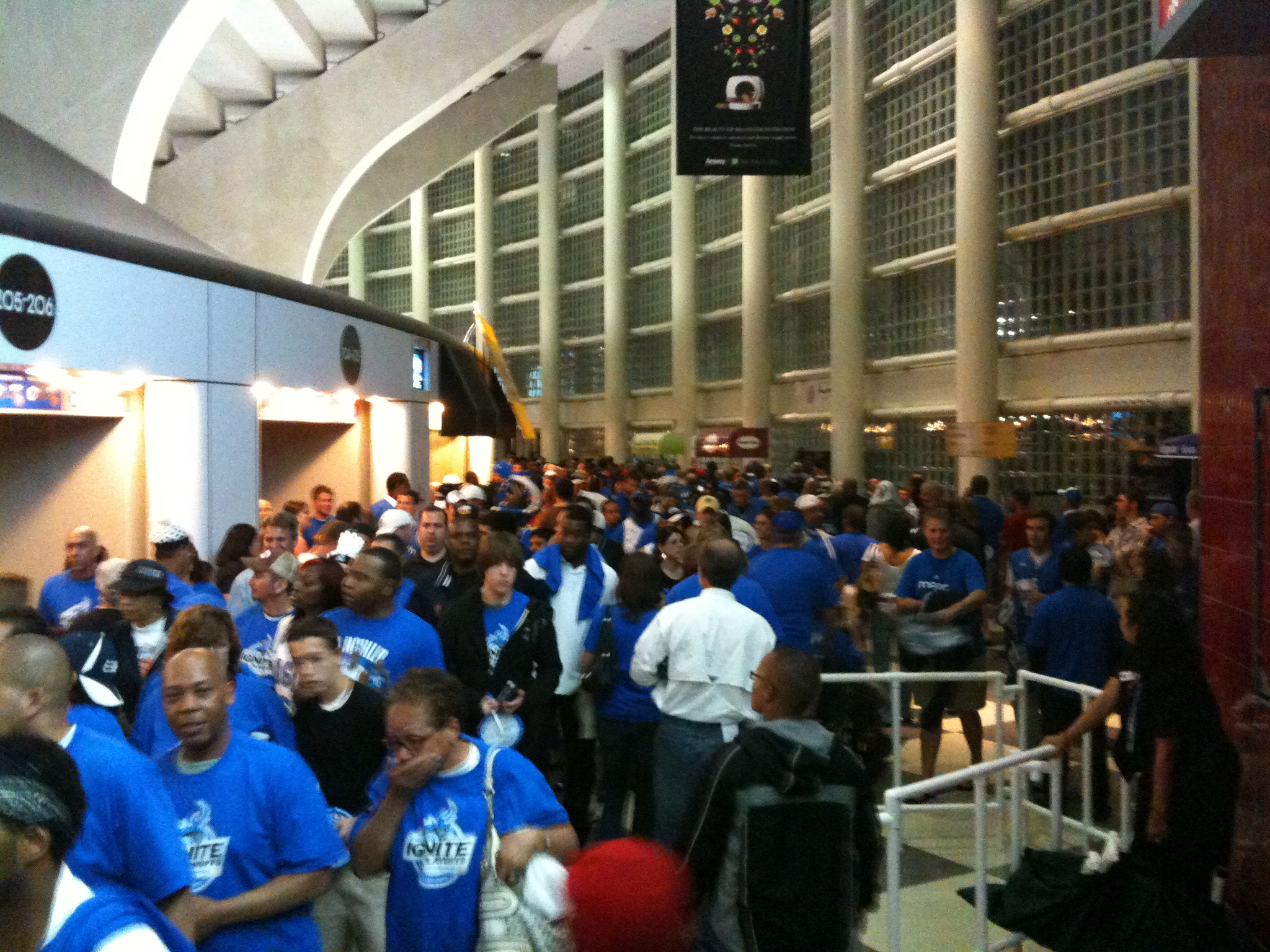
The arena had only one concourse for over 17,000 people, which would get extremely congested.

Attendance to Magic NBA games was strong, with a waiting list of 3,700 names on the season ticket list in 1996, even after a 1994 renovation made the seats narrower. However, experts stated that the arena was outdated since the day its doors first opened. Although it was built to NBA specifications at the time, construction began right before mid level luxury seating and lower-level club seating became the de facto standard, and the arena lacked both of these lucrative features. Also, the placement of the skyboxes gave them the worst sightlines in the arena, consequently Fortune 500 companies in the vicinity such as SunTrust, Lockheed Martin, Darden Restaurants, and Hughes Supply did not lease the luxury suites.

The Orlando Magic's desire for a major renovation of the building dated to 1994, when the arena was only five years old, as the team was seeking to increase revenue by expanding the limited retail and concession space and luxury seating. In 1996, the team spent $100,000 to have Conventions Sports & Leisure of Minneapolis study and determine renovation ideas. Major renovation seemed unfeasible in 1997, when the task-force determined that the cost of implementing everything that the team wanted would reach up to $75 million. However, even if luxury suites were relocated to the midlevel, the city had few corporations in the area willing to pay the $100,000-plus a year lease rates. The revenues brought in by the changes likely would not be enough to cover mortgage payments on money that would have to be borrowed to pay for the renovation. Also, at the time, the city still owed $40 million on the original construction of the building.

Beginning around 2000, the Magic began to push the City of Orlando for a brand new arena, replacing the TD Waterhouse Centre. Since the city, as well as Orange County, were not keen on picking up the tab for a second facility in a little over a decade, the Magic stated they would contribute to the cost of building it. They did not, however, say how much. They also indicated they expected public dollars to be used, too. Discussions became contentious in 2001, as the team threatened to look elsewhere if Orlando would not build a new arena, or contribute a significant amount to a renovation. At the time, the team was losing $8 million annually. Magic President Bob Vander Weide stated, "If we can't break even in the long term and we can't stay competitive, maybe this isn't the best place for us." The Magic outlined where an arena should be built, the potential cost, what type of tax should pay for it and what could be done with the existing building once it was abandoned by the team. In a meeting with county and city officials, team owner DeVos said he was seeking $200 million in public money, including $121.5 million from the tourist tax collected by the county, $50 million from the city of Orlando and $28.5 million from the state. Officials were staunchly opposed. Any plans for renovation or replacement relied on tourist-tax revenue, and after the terrorist attacks of 9/11, the numbers of tourists in the area declined sharply. Then-Orlando Mayor Glenda Hood and Orange County Mayor Rich Crotty were close to a deal for a major renovation, but talks were broken off for several years due to the sagging tourist tax dollars. At the grand opening of the Amway Center on October 1, 2010, Crotty remarked "When I look around this building, I think to myself, 'Boy, am I glad that didn't work.' Sometimes good comes out of bad."

== Successor arena and demolition ==
On September 29, 2006, the City of Orlando and Orange County finally came to an agreement on a $1.1-billion improvement package that included $480 million for a new arena. The Magic would provide $114 million in cash and up-front lease payments and guarantee $100 million in bonds toward the arena. The venue plan received final approval on July 26, 2007, and the arena was completed in time for the 2010–11 NBA season. Amway Arena's last day of operation was September 30, 2010, as arena operations then moved to the new Amway Center.

The City of Orlando began demolition of Amway Arena's interior on December 15, 2011, originally planning to take about six months to traditionally demolish the facility. The majority of the building was instead imploded at 7:30 a.m. on March 25, 2012, leaving only the corner columns standing, which would be removed along with the rest of the rubble over the following months. One man was injured after being hit by debris.

Currently, plans call for the remainder of the Centroplex to also be demolished to make way for a "Creative Village" complex on the site. It will be home to digital media companies and related industries. There will be 35% office space, 45% residential space, and 20% for other uses including education, hotels, retail, and entertainment. The goal of the complex is to redevelop the site into "a place where high-tech companies locate; and employees of those businesses and other residents live, work, learn and play".

== Notable events ==
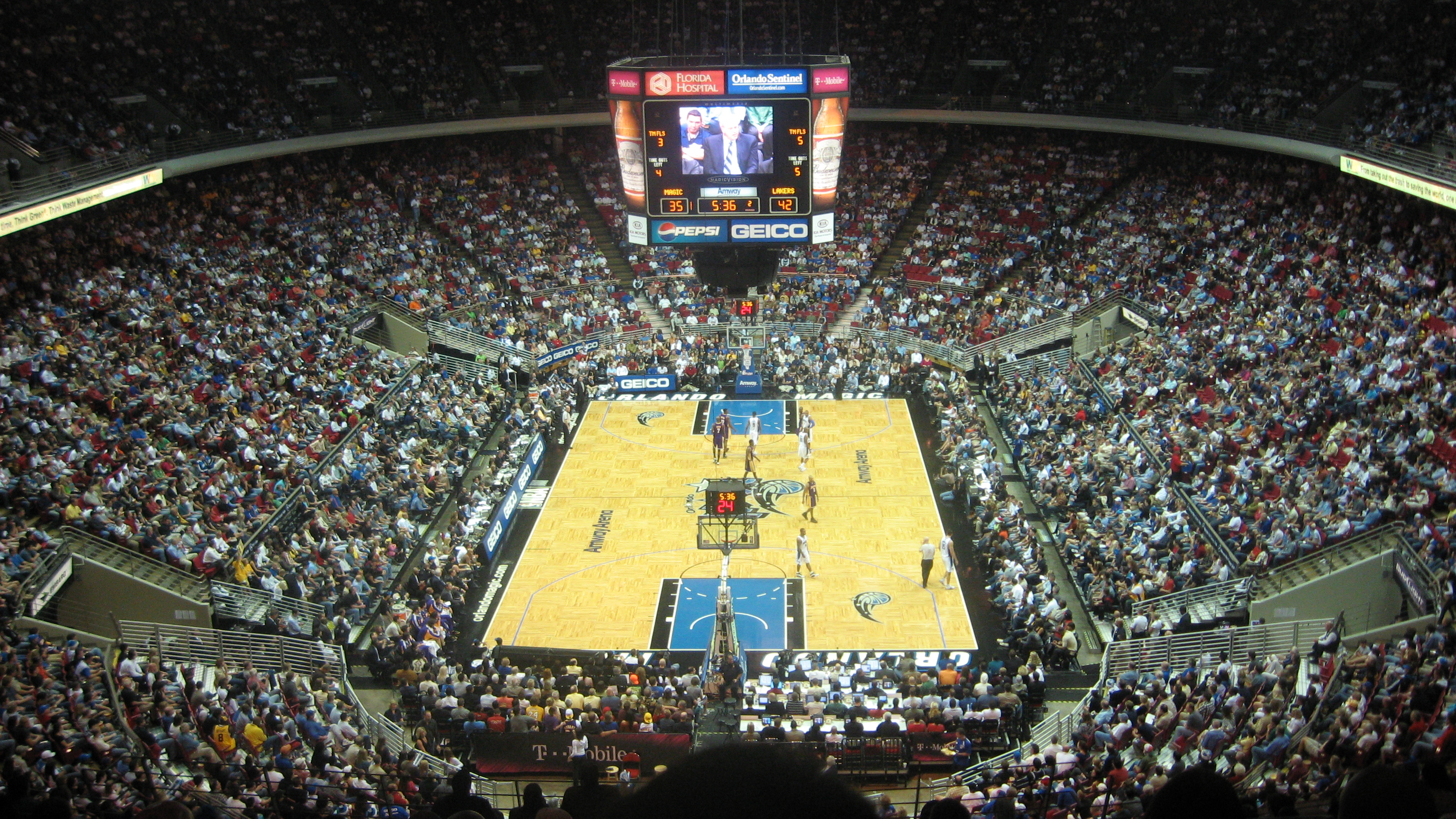
The Orlando Magic playing against the Los Angeles Lakers in Amway Arena.

=== Sports ===
Notable basketball events include the 1990 SEC men's basketball tournament, as well as early rounds of the NCAA Tournament in 1993, 1996, 1999, and 2004. The 42nd annual NBA All-Star Game was held at the facility on February 9, 1992. Games 1 and 2 of the 1995 NBA Finals between the Magic and the Houston Rockets were held at the arena, as well as Games 3, 4, and 5 of the 2009 NBA Finals between the Magic and the Los Angeles Lakers. The final NBA game at Amway Arena was Game 5 of the Eastern Conference Finals against the Boston Celtics on May 26, 2010; the Magic won that game. The Celtics would then win Game 6 in Boston, advancing to face the Lakers in the 2010 NBA Finals.

Other sporting events include the 1992 United States Figure Skating Championships and the IHL Finals in 1996, 1999 and 2001, when the Orlando Solar Bears won the Turner Cup in the IHL's last season of operations. During the 1993–94 NHL season, the Tampa Bay Lightning played five of their home games at the arena. In 2004, Orlando was selected as one of five cities to host the Dew Tour, an extreme sports franchise started in 2005. It was the site of the PlayStation Pro, the final event each season on the tour. Three ArenaBowl games were held at the facility. The Orlando Predators lost to the Detroit Drive in 1992 and Arizona Rattlers in 1994 before defeating the Nashville Kats in 2000. The final sporting event at Amway Arena was an Orlando Predators game on July 24, 2010, against the Oklahoma City Yard Dawgz.

=== Political events ===
On October 20, 2008, Democratic Presidential Candidate Barack Obama held a major outdoor rally immediately outside the Amway Arena north entrance that drew over 50,000 supporters and was televised nationally. Additional speakers at the rally included U.S. Senators Hillary Clinton and Bill Nelson, and Orlando Mayor Buddy Dyer. The major rally drew national attention to Florida as an election battle-ground state and was covered live on national evening newscasts on all major networks. A similar rally was held in 2004 by Democratic Presidential Candidate John Kerry inside the Amway Arena.

=== Other events ===
R.E.M. performed at the arena on April 30, 1989. It was one of two R.E.M. shows recorded for Westwood One's Superstars In Concert radio show, the other being their show at Miami Arena the night before.

Several tracks on Ozzy Osbourne's 1993 Live & Loud album were recorded during his August 16, 1992 performance at the arena.

Many professional wrestling pay-per-view events were held at Amway Arena, including the 1990 WWF Royal Rumble, 1994 WCW Bash at the Beach, and WWE Armageddon 2003. On March 29, 2008, WWE held their Hall of Fame induction at the arena in conjunction with WrestleMania XXIV, which was held at the Florida Citrus Bowl.

NSYNC's final official concert, the last leg of Celebrity Tour, was held at the arena on April 28, 2002. Following that, Justin Timberlake embarked on a successful solo career, and performed again at the arena on July 15, 2003, as part of The Justified & Stripped Tour. The band was based in Orlando.

Many Orange and Seminole County public high schools held their graduation ceremonies at the arena.

The final event at Amway Arena was a performance of the So You Think You Can Dance Tour on September 30, 2010.

Events and tenants
Preceded by first arena	Home of the Orlando Magic; 1989–2010	Succeeded by Kia Center
Preceded by first arena	Home of the Orlando Predators; 1991–2010	Succeeded by Kia Center
Preceded by Madison Square Garden	Home of the Orlando Titans; 2010	Succeeded by last arena
Preceded by first arena	Home of the Orlando Miracle; 1999–2002	Succeeded by Mohegan Sun Arena (as Connecticut Sun)
Preceded by Charlotte Coliseum	Host of the NBA All-Star Game; 1992	Succeeded by Delta Center
