= Miami Arena =

Arena in Miami, Florida, United States

- The Pink Elephant

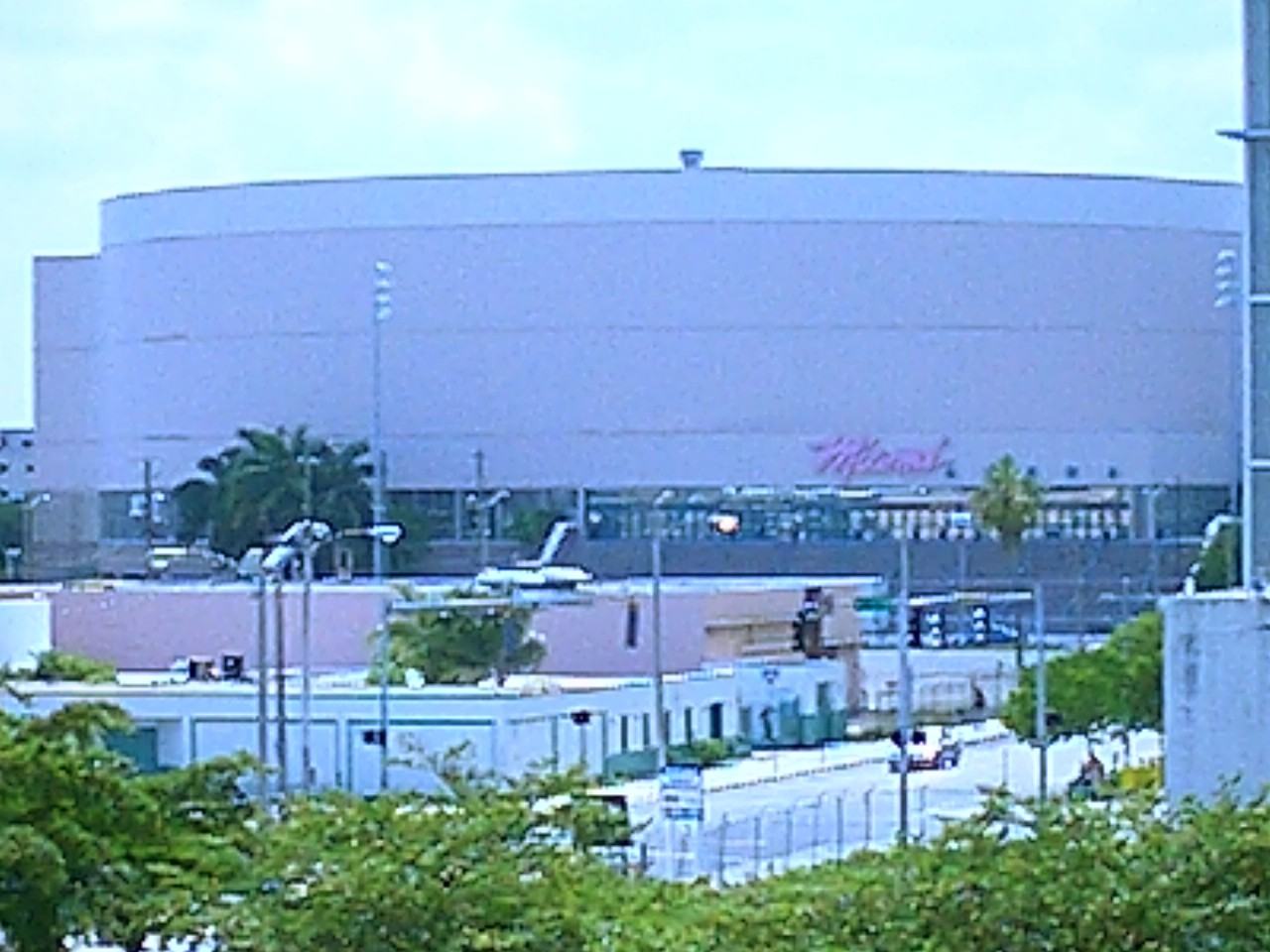
- Miami Arena circa 2002
- Interactive map of Miami Arena
- Address: 721 NW 1st Ave
- Location: Miami, Florida
- Coordinates: 25°46′52″N 80°11′41″W
- Owner: City of Miami (1988–2004); Arena Ventures, LLC. (2004–2008)
- Operator: Miami Sports and Entertainment Authority
- Capacity: 15,200 (basketball); 14,700 (hockey)
- Public transit: Historic Overtown/Lyric Theatre

Construction
- Groundbreaking: August 4, 1986
- Opened: July 13, 1988
- Closed: July 2008
- Demolished: August–October 2008
- Cost: $52.5 million ($143 million in 2025 dollars)
- Architect: Lloyd Jones Fillpot Associates
- Structural engineer: Walter P. Moore
- General contractor: Linbeck Construction Company

Tenants
- Miami Heat (NBA) (1988–1999); Miami Hurricanes (NCAA) (1988–2002); Florida Hammerheads (RHI) (1993); Florida Panthers (NHL) (1993–1998); Miami Hooters (AFL) (1993–1995); Miami Matadors (ECHL) (1998–1999); Miami Manatees (WHA2) (2003–2004); Miami Morays (NIFL) (2005)

Miami Arena was an indoor arena located in Miami, Florida. The venue served as the home of the Miami Heat of the National Basketball Association (NBA) and the Florida Panthers of the National Hockey League (NHL). From 1988 until 2002, it also was the indoor arena for the Miami Hurricanes.

== History ==
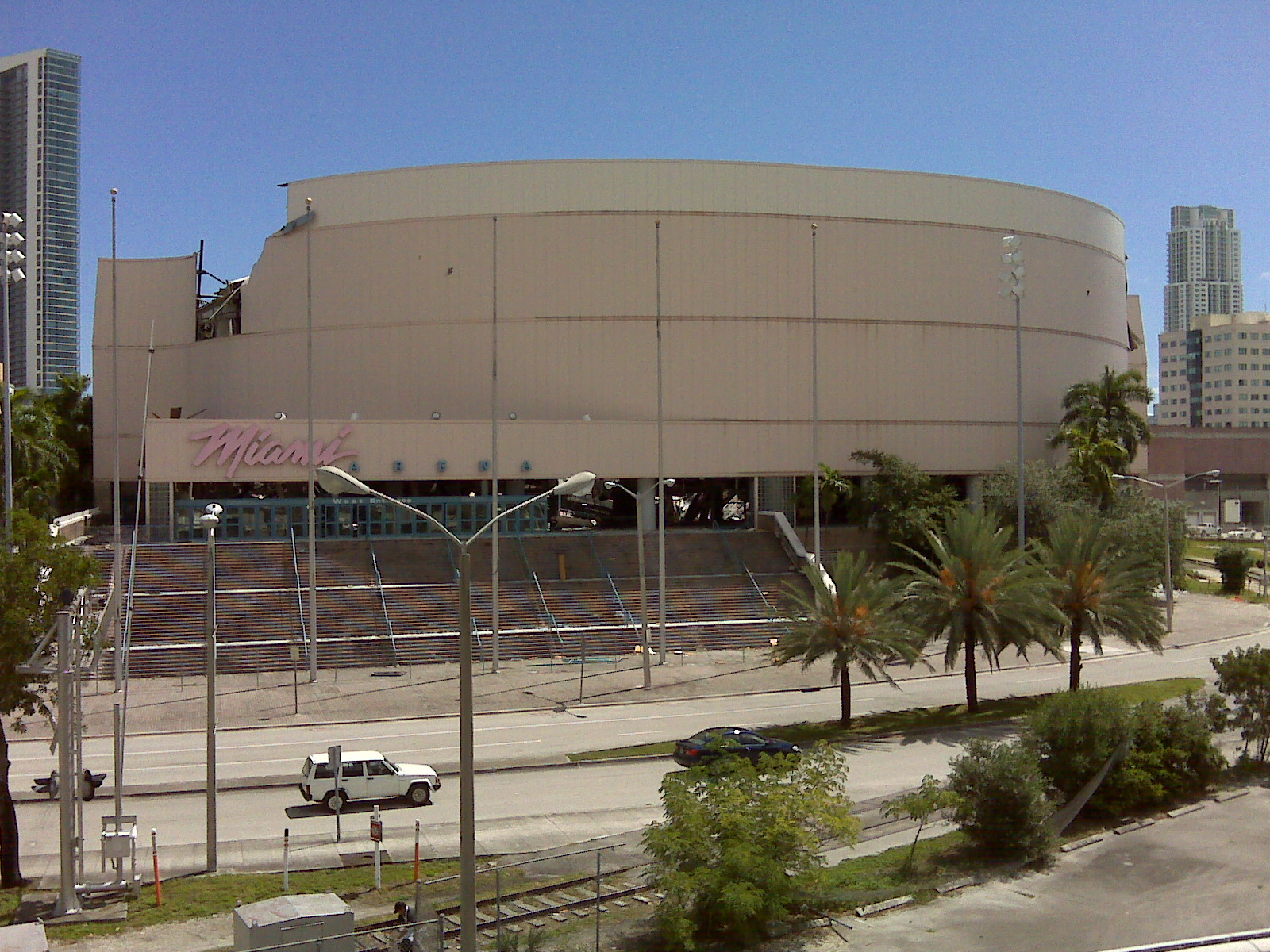
Miami Arena being demolished, view from the west, taken September 24, 2008. The west wall was the last to fall, October 21, 2008.

Completed in 1988 at a cost of $52.5 million, its opening took business away from the Hollywood Sportatorium and eventually led to that venue's demolition. The arena was the home of the Miami Heat from 1988 to 1999, the Florida Panthers from 1993 to 1998, the University of Miami basketball teams from 1988 to 2003, the Miami Hooters of the Arena Football League from 1993 to 1995, the Miami Matadors of the ECHL in 1998 and the Miami Manatees of the WHA2 in 2003. The first game played by the Heat in their first home was a loss to the Los Angeles Clippers, 111–91, on November 5, 1988; the first victory came a month and a half later against the Utah Jazz, 101–80.

The arena also hosted the 1990 NBA All-Star Game, the 1991 WWF Royal Rumble, the 1994 NCAA men's basketball East Regional final, the NHL's 1996 Stanley Cup Finals between the Florida Panthers and Colorado Avalanche and the NBA's 1997 NBA Playoffs Eastern Conference Finals between the Miami Heat and Chicago Bulls.

By 1998, the Miami Arena, like most indoor sports arenas built in the late 1980s, was beginning to show its age, despite being only 10 years old. Its seating capacity was one of the lowest of any NBA or NHL arena. In addition, sports teams in general began wanting newer, more updated facilities, specifically luxury suites and new concessions. In 1998, the Panthers moved into the National Car Rental Center (now Amerant Bank Arena) in Sunrise, near Florida's largest outlet mall, Sawgrass Mills. On January 2, 2000, the Heat moved to the new American Airlines Arena (now Kaseya Center) located three blocks east of Miami Arena on the shore of Biscayne Bay.

After the year 2000, the arena became mostly inactive, as most of the concerts that were held at Miami Arena moved to the newer venues. However, the Miami Manatees of the WHA2 played at the Miami Arena in 2003, and the Miami Morays indoor football team played at the arena in 2005.

The arena was easily accessible via mass transit, with a Metrorail stop at Historic Overtown/Lyric Theatre station just across the street (once known as Overtown/Arena station). Miami-Dade city buses also service the arena area downtown. Miami Arena was sometimes called the "Pink Elephant", because it was a white elephant with pink colored walls.

In 2004, the arena was sold in a public auction to Glenn Straub, an investor from Palm Beach County, for half of the price the city of Miami paid for its original construction. On August 3, 2008, Straub announced in a television interview that the interior of the arena had been cleared out and that the building would be demolished by the end of the month. On September 21, 2008, the roof of the Miami Arena was imploded. While the exterior walls remained standing after the implosion, demolition continued until the falling of the west wall on October 21, 2008. A parking lot now exists where the arena used to stand.

== Seating capacity ==
Basketball

- 1988–1993 – 15,008
- 1993–2008 – 15,200

Ice hockey/arena football

- 14,703

Concerts

- Full house: 16,627
- 3/4 house: 9,878
- 1/2 house: 7,485
- In the round: 16,694
- the space in arena is 1,560

Other

- Banquets – 500
- Luxury suites – 26

== Events ==
List of Events
- Julio Iglesias – July 13, 1988 (Arena's opening concert)
- Robert Plant – July 14, 1988, with Cheap Trick and October 23, 1990, with The Black Crowes
- AC/DC – August 11, 1988, with White Lion,
- Eazy-E - August 23, 1989 (Eazy Duz It Tour),

February 21, 1991, with King's X and January 21, 1996, with The Poor

- Elton John – September 9–10, 1988, October 13–14, 1989, May 5, 1993 and May 4 and October 2, 1998
- Bob Dylan – September 23, 1988
- Frank Sinatra – September 24, 1988 and January 20–21, 1989, with Sammy Davis Jr. and Liza Minnelli
- Gloria Estefan & Miami Sound Machine – October 1, 1988 (Broadcast Live on Showtime and later released on Home Video as The Homecoming Concert)
- The Grateful Dead – October 14, 1988, October 25–26, 1989 and April 6–8, 1994
- Poison – October 15, 1988, with Lita Ford and Britny Fox, March 15, 1989, with Ratt and Tesla and March 23, 1991, with Slaughter
- The Moody Blues – November 9, 1988
- Neil Diamond – December 18–20, 1988, February 21–22, 1993 and December 9, 1996
- Duran Duran – January 14, 1989, with The Pursuit of Happiness
- Bon Jovi – February 9, 1989, with Skid Row and September 9, 1995
- Ratt – April 28, 1989, with Kix and Great White
- R.E.M. – April 29, 1989, with Drivin' N' Cryin' (Tracks from this show and from April 30th at Orlando Arena were broadcast on the radio) and September 8, 1995, with Radiohead
- Rod Stewart – April 30, 1989 and October 13, 1991
- Tom Petty and the Heartbreakers – July 5, 1989, with The Replacements, October 22, 1991, with Chris Whitley and May 15 and 17, 1995, with Pete Droge
- Jimmy Buffett & The Coral Reefer Band – August 5, 1989, with The Neville Brothers, January 24, 1991, with Greg "Fingers" Taylor & The Ladyfingers Revue and January 24, 1992, with Evangeline
- The Doobie Brothers – September 1, 1989
- Stevie Nicks – September 30, 1989, with The Hooters
- The Beach Boys – October 7, 1989, with Chicago
- Stevie Ray Vaughan & Double Trouble and Jeff Beck – November 21, 1989
- Mötley Crüe – January 21, 1990, with Raging Slab
- Rush – February 22, 1990, with Mr. Big, February 28, 1992, with Primus and February 27, 1994, with Candlebox (Recording of "Show Don't Tell" from 1994 show was included on Different Stages)
- Janet Jackson – March 1 (her debut concert) and July 12, 1990, with Chuckii Booker and January 20, 1994
- Billy Joel – March 12, 1990 and February 8, 14 and 18–19 and April 15–16, 1994
- Whitesnake – March 24, 1990
- Dolly Parton – April 21, 1990
- Aerosmith – April 22, 1990, with Joan Jett and the Blackhearts and February 2, 1994, with Brother Cane
- David Bowie – April 27, 1990
- Depeche Mode – May 31, 1990, with Nitzer Ebb, October 2, 1993, with The The and November 13, 1998, with Stabbing Westward
- Heart – June 8, 1990
- MC Hammer – June 30, 1990 Please Hammer Don't Hurt 'Em World Tour, April 10, 1992 Too Legit to Quit World Tour
- Eric Clapton – July 21–23, 1990, May 25, 1992, September 5–6, 1995, with Clarence "Gatemouth" Brown and April 25, 1998, with Distant Cousins
- The B-52's – July 28, 1990
- KISS – August 3, 1990, with Danger Danger and Slaughter, October 31, 1992 and September 17, 1996, with The Verve Pipe
- Billy Idol – September 29, 1990, with Faith No More
- Fleetwood Mac – October 24, 1990, with Squeeze
- Judas Priest – December 20, 1990, with Testament and Megadeth
- INXS – January 22 and February 5, 1991
- Sting – February 27, 1991 and February 23, 1994, with Melissa Etheridge
- Gloria Estefan – March 1–2 and 6–7, 1991 and September 20–22 and 24, 1996 (Sept 20–21 gigs were filmed live on HBO Telecast, also released on VHS/DVD as The Evolution Tour: Live in Miami)
- Neil Young & Crazy Horse – March 9, 1991, with Sonic Youth
- Cinderella – March 11, 1991
- ZZ Top – April 5–7, 1991, with Dreams So Real
- Scorpions – May 26, 1991, with Great White and Trixter
- Whitney Houston – June 11, 1991, with After 7
- David Lee Roth – June 15, 1991, with Cinderella and Extreme
- Suicidal Tendencies – June 27, 1991
- Don Henley – June 29, 1991
- Queensrÿche – July 3, 1991 and June 25, 1995, with Type O Negative
- Yes – July 6, 1991 and August 10, 1994
- Slayer – July 14, 1991, with Megadeth, Anthrax and Alice in Chains
- The Allman Brothers Band – October 31, 1991, with Little Feat
- Van Halen – December 13, 1991, with Alice in Chains and March 17, 1995
- U2 – March 1, 1992, with The Pixies
- Metallica – March 14, 1992, with Metal Church and April 19, 1997, with Corrosion of Conformity
- Bryan Adams – April 12, with The Storm and December 4, 1992
- The Cure – June 3–4, 1992, with The Cranes and August 30, 1996
- Michael Bolton – July 30, 1992, with Celine Dion
- Ozzy Osbourne – August 14, 1992, with Slaughter and Ugly Kid Joe
- Tesla – October 1, 1992, with FireHouse
- Bruce Springsteen – November 24, 1992
- Def Leppard – February 2, 1993
- Peter Gabriel – August 4, 1993
- Tina Turner – August 22, 1993
- Sade – September 22, 1993
- Mariah Carey – November 3, 1993 (her debut concert)
- Phil Collins – May 30–31, 1994 and March 3, 1997
- Meat Loaf & His Neverland Express – July 29, 1994
- Steely Dan – August 21, 1994
- Luis Miguel – October 6–9, 1994, October 9–10, 1995, November 30, 1997, February 7–8, 1998 and February 16–17, 2002
- Nine Inch Nails – November 20, 1994, with Marilyn Manson and The Jim Rose Circus and May 17, 2000, with A Perfect Circle
- The Eagles – February 27, 1995
- Page & Plant – March 6, 1995 and May 22, 1998
- Boston – June 30, 1995
- Melissa Etheridge – July 3, 1995, with Joan Osborne
- Live – July 30, 1995, with Buffalo Tom
- AC/DC - January 21, 1996, with The Poor
- White Zombie – February 2, 1996, with Filter
- Bob Seger & The Silver Bullet Band – February 9, 1996
- Garth Brooks – April 18–20, 1996
- LL Cool J – June 7, 1996, with R. Kelly, Xscape and Solo
- The 1996 Stanley Cup Finals – June 8 and 10–11 (Florida Panthers vs. Colorado Avalanche) This was the first appearance the Panthers made in the Stanley Cup Finals. They were swept by the Avalanche 4-0.
- Pantera – July 6, 1996, with White Zombie
- The Smashing Pumpkins – November 17, 1996, with Garbage
- New Edition – January 24, 1997, with Keith Sweat, Blackstreet and 702
- Bush – March 20, 1997, with Veruca Salt
- Prince & The New Power Generation – August 15, 1997
- The Fugees – September 13, 1997
- Bone Thugs-n-Harmony – September 21, 1997
- Enrique Iglesias – December 12–13, 1997
- The Backstreet Boys – July 10, 1998, with Aaron Carter
- Brooks & Dunn – July 17, 1998, with Reba McEntire, Terri Clark and David Kersh
- The Family Values Tour – May 11, 1999
- Los Van Van – October 9, 1999
- Ricky Martin – October 20–21, 1999, with Jessica Simpson
- System of a Down – November 5, 1999, with Limp Bizkit and Method Man
- Alejandro Fernández – November 14, 1999, with Elvis Crespo
- Shakira – April 22, 2000
- Blink-182 – May 19, 2000, with Bad Religion and Fenix TX
- Marc Anthony – July 27–29, 2000
- Juan Luis Guerra – August 27, 2000 and May 9, 2005, with Ricardo Montaner and Gian Marco Zignago
- Carlos Vives – September 16, 2000
- Juan Gabriel – November 18, 2000, with Ana Gabriel
- Vicente Fernández – July 21, 2001, with Alejandro Fernández
- Marcos Witt – May 21, 2002 for Dios de Pactos (God of Covenants)
- Sasha & John Digweed – March 23, 2002, with Jimmy Van M
- Maná – October 25, 2002
- Dragon Tales Live – February 27, 2003 - March 2, 2003
- Marco Antonio Solís – May 25, 2003
- The Damned – August 13, 2003
- Berlin – October 4, 2003
- Chayanne – April 2, 2004
- Disney on Ice – December 6, 2004
- Kutless – March 5, 2005
- Wisin & Yandel – July 9, 2005
- The SCREAM Tour – September 4, 2005
- Molotov – November 6, 2005, with Rata Blanca and Jarabe de Palo

Events and tenants
Preceded by none	Home of the Miami Heat; 1988–1999	Succeeded by Kaseya Center
Preceded by none	Home of the Florida Panthers; 1993–1998	Succeeded by FLA Live Arena
Preceded by Astrodome	Host of the NBA All-Star Game; 1990	Succeeded by Charlotte Coliseum
