= Alabama Slammers =

Defunct ice hockey team based in Pelham, Alabama

- Sport: Ice hockey
- Founded: 2003
- Folded: By January 2007
- League: World Hockey Association 2
- Location: Pelham, Alabama, USA
- Arena: Pelham Civic Center
- Owner: David Waronker
- Head coach: Garry Unger

The Alabama Slammers were a professional ice hockey team. They were a member of the World Hockey Association 2 and played their home games at Pelham Civic Center in Pelham, Alabama, a suburb of Birmingham. The Slammers were one of eight minor league hockey teams purchased or founded by real estate mogul David Waronker starting in 2003. By January 2007 all but one of those teams had ceased operations. They were coached to a 34-20-0-4 record, second in the league, by former NHL centerman Garry Unger. They were defeated by the Macon Trax in the semifinal round of the WHA2 playoffs.

The league folded after one season, with three of the remaining teams moving to the Southern Professional Hockey League, but the Slammers folded before making the move.

== 2003-04 roster ==
- #30 Jamie Ronayne
- #34 Geoff Kilgore
- #17 Bobby Quinnell
- #18 Jorin Welsh
- #29 Mark Loeding
- #7 Stephane Desjardins
- #2 Tom Wilson
- #12 Joe Savioli
- #3 Doug Mann
- #15 Hugo Belanger
- #27 Chad Peck
- #16 Jeff Coulter
- #8 Justin Schabes
- #61 Mike Craigen
- #24 Ryan Prentice
- #11 Jeff Mead
- #19 Doug Lawrence
- #9 Tony Patterson
- #22 Jaroslav Kresec
- #91 Jason Renard
- #15 Jeff Cheeseman
