= Florida Seals =

American ice hockey team

- City: Orlando, Florida (2002–04); Kissimmee, Florida (2005–06)
- League: ACHL (2002–03); WHA2 (2003–04); SPHL (2005–07)
- Founded: 2002
- Operated: May 2002 – Jan 2007
- Home arena: Amway Arena (2002–04) Silver Spurs Arena (2005–06)
- Colors: Blue, Black, Red, Gray, White
- Owners: Orlando Professional Hockey, Inc.
- General manager: Sammy Wallace (2002); Joe Fellini (2002–2003); Brian Fling (2004); Various (2005–2007)
- Head coach: Stan Drulia (2002–03); Jim Paek (2003–04); Tom Stewart (2005–07)

Franchise history
- 2002–2004: Orlando Seals
- 2005–2007: Florida Seals

Championships
- Regular season titles: 2003 Commissioner's Cup (ACHL)
- Playoff championships: 2003 President's Cup (ACHL)

The Florida Seals were a minor league ice hockey franchise, a member of the Southern Professional Hockey League (SPHL). Originally based in Orlando, Florida, as the Orlando Seals, they later moved to Kissimmee, Florida, a suburb thirty miles south of Orlando in Osceola County. The Seals were one of eight minor league hockey teams purchased or founded by David Waronker starting in 2003.

== History ==
The team was formed as the Orlando Seals and played its first season beginning in October 2002 with the Atlantic Coast Hockey League (ACHL). That first year's team included former NHL players Zac Boyer, David Goverde, Chris LiPuma, and Terry Ryan. It was coached by former Tampa Bay Lightning player Stan Drulia. The Seals were running away with the league during the regular season and made a pivotal move at the trade deadline getting high scoring center Mike Sanderson and defenseman Dave Mills. These moves at the trade deadline gave the Seals the final pieces to win the ACHL regular season. The Seals' original staff was made up of owner Jeff Brubaker until he ran out of money one month into the season and David Waronker took over the franchise. The staff included several former employees of the Orlando Solar Bears (IHL) including GM Sammy Wallace, Joe Fellini, John Dyer as well as newcomers Erika Hodges, and Tom Bradley. With the backing of several Solar Bears' season ticket holders, the Seals got off to a solid start attendance-wise and later on the ice thanks to a solid core of hockey fans in Orlando and a roster full of veteran players. With Waronker's investment, the staff was able to make the team a success. The Seals were the winners of that league's first and only President's Cup in 2003 as well as the Commissioner's Cup as regular season champions after a 43–14 record. League Commissioner Jim Riggs awarded the trophy to the Waronker and Orlando mayor Buddy Dyer during an on-ice ceremony at one of the regular season games. The Seals swept both Macon Trax and Knoxville in the playoffs to win the championship on the road in Knoxville.

The team's celebration event, held at Wall Street Plaza in downtown Orlando, drew hundreds of fans to celebrate the city's second hockey championship. When the ACHL folded, they and two other teams, the Jacksonville Barracudas and the Macon Trax, merged into the new World Hockey Association 2 (WHA2), founded by Waronker and longtime Canadian hockey man and former WHA staffer Peter Young. The second season brought a coaching change as Stan Drulia left Orlando to take over the coaching duties of the Augusta Lynx of the ECHL. Former Pittsburgh Penguin Jim Paek was brought in to lead the Seals in year two.

After the 2003–04 season, the team went through several coaching and staff change including Paek being replaced by former Macon Trax head coach Tommy Stewart when the Trax ceased operations. The Seals were also announced to join the Southern Professional Hockey League (SPHL) for the 2004–05 season.

On August 22, 2004, the City of Orlando revoked its lease at the TD Waterhouse Centre due to a clause about attendance and the Seals would miss the season. On October 19, 2004, the ownership group announced a new three-year lease with the Silver Spurs Arena in Kissimmee, changing its name to the Florida Seals. The team resumed play in the 2005–06 season, hosting their first home game against the Jacksonville Barracudas on October 29, 2005. The Seals finished the 2005–06 season with a 32–17 record with seven overtime losses, placing third in the league, but lost the President's Cup to the Knoxville Ice Bears in five games.

Before the 2006–07 season, Waronker agreed in principle to sell the team to real estate developer Bill Lucia. However, while the deal closed in May 2006, Lucia did not file the required league paperwork until October and never made a formal presentation to the league. Later in the month, the team's general manager resigned. On January 4, 2007, Osceola Heritage Park, operators of the Silver Spurs Arena, abruptly locked out the Seals after they failed to meet their contractual obligations. OHP facility director Robb Larson said that OHP had run out of patience with the Seals after giving them numerous chances to get back in compliance. Stewart told WFTV that the team was short on cash and had missed several payments on its lease with the arena. At the same time, the players had been kicked out of their apartments because the team was not paying the rent.

The next day, the SPHL Board of Directors held an emergency meeting and voted to expel the Seals from the league. The players were parceled out to the other SPHL teams in a dispersal draft.

Lucia later revealed that, for all intents and purposes, the rest of the board had essentially abandoned the team; he had been the only one paying the bills.

Several members of the Seals' organization continued their careers in professional sports with Sammy Wallace working for the Germain Arena in Estero, Florida, and Peter Young was with a baseball team in Arizona. Joe Fellini became the director of sales at the Tsongas Center at University of Massachusetts Lowell in Massachusetts, while Brian Fling moved to Colorado to work in the private sector. Ryan Morris was working in the music field with Rymo Records. Erika Hodges went on to work for the Florida Panthers, and Tom Bradley earned a Stanley Cup ring with the Tampa Bay Lightning. The Seals first two coaches were still active with Drulia working with the Milwaukee Admirals and Paek with the Grand Rapids Griffins.

== Championships ==
Year	League	Trophy
2002–2003	ACHL	President's Cup

The mascot of the Florida Seals was Sealvester. He wore a jersey emblazoned with the number "05".
