= World Hockey Association (proposed) =

Proposed rival league to the NHL

- The proposed league's logo
- Sport: Ice hockey
- Founded: 2003
- Folded: 2009
- Countries: Canada and United States

The World Hockey Association (WHA) was a proposed professional hockey league intended to compete with the established National Hockey League during the 2004–05 NHL lockout. Noteworthy for instability and failed plans, its organization operated several minor and junior leagues thereafter.

== History ==
Seeking to capitalize upon the original World Hockey Association of the 1970s, Allan Howell and Dr. Nick Vaccaro announced in 2003 the formation of a new professional hockey league calling itself the "World Hockey Association." Original WHA superstar Bobby Hull was named its commissioner. The league was regarded by many as an attempt to fill the void that loomed as the NHL's serious labour problems, which led to the 2004–05 NHL lockout. Most hockey commentators felt that the league's best hope was to operate while the NHL players were locked out and try to develop enough of a following to survive once the NHL labour problems were resolved.

It was projected that the league would begin operation with teams from Dallas, Detroit, Halifax, Hamilton, Miami, Toronto, Vancouver and Quebec City. Five teams went so far as to acquire nicknames: the Detroit Gladiators (which planned to play at the Pontiac Silverdome, a venue that had never hosted hockey before); the Dallas Americans (which introduced Toronto Maple Leafs goaltender Ed Belfour as goalie/co-owner); the Quebec Nordiks (a tweaking of the old Quebec Nordiques nickname); the Toronto Toros (adopting the nickname of the original WHA team of the same name); and the Halifax IceBreakers.

After being pushed back from June 2, a WHA draft took place on July 18, 2004 in Niagara Falls, Ontario. Future superstar Sidney Crosby was the first pick; he turned down the league's three-year, $7.5 million offer. By August, however, things began to unravel: the WHA pulled the Quebec franchise and Toronto, unable to find an arena, dropped out soon afterwards. The Florida-based franchise, apparently headed for Miami, then Jacksonville and finally Orlando, quietly expired. By September, the new WHA was down to four teams and had pushed its debut back to November. By October, Dallas had folded and an announced "restructuring" never took place.

In the spring of 2005, the league announced the "Bobby Hull Invitational Tournament," for which 50 NHL players had purportedly showed interest. The tournament, scheduled to begin May 20 and award $2 million to the winning team, was dropped without comment by the organization and never held.

When that and other plans failed to materialize, the rights to the WHA's name and logo were sold to Richard Smith, a British Columbia investor. Further plans to operate either a similar Tier II junior league or a professional loop in the Pennsylvania-Midwest area in 2007–2008 were dropped without comment by the organization, in addition to financial problems that led to the company's stockbroker calling for a legal investigation and subsequently filing a lawsuit against the WHA.

The organization operated three now-defunct leagues, two playing a single season each before folding and the third playing two seasons; the minor-league World Hockey Association 2 and the WHA Super Junior League in Florida, the latter which was abandoned with little to no warning to players and the communities involved. It operated an unsanctioned Tier II developmental league in British Columbia called the WHA Junior West Hockey League between 2006 and 2008, marked by financial and franchise instabilities that saw the WHA's stock price drop to a fraction of a penny per share. While the organization announced a third season for the Junior West Hockey League, no teams were ever iced or games played, and the league's website was taken down after September 2008.
