= Jacksonville Barracudas =

- City: Jacksonville, Florida
- League: Atlantic Coast Hockey League (2002–2003); World Hockey Association 2 (2003–2004); Southern Professional Hockey League (2004–2008)
- Founded: 2002
- Folded: 2008
- Home arena: Jacksonville Coliseum (2002–2003); Jacksonville Veterans Memorial Arena (2003–2007); Jacksonville Ice (2007–2008)
- Colors: navy blue, red
- Owner: Stephen Croskrey
- General manager: Gilles Richard
- Head coach: Rick Allain
- Media: The Florida Times-Union

Franchise history
- 2002–2008: Jacksonville Barracudas

Championships
- Regular season titles: 1 (2003-04 WHA2)

The Jacksonville Barracudas were a professional minor league ice hockey team based in Jacksonville, Florida. They were established in 2002, and played in the Atlantic Coast Hockey League (2002–2003), the World Hockey Association 2 (2003–2004), and the Southern Professional Hockey League (2004–2008), before folding in 2008.

They won the WHA2 championship title in 2003 – becoming the only Jacksonville pro hockey team to win a league championship – and went to the playoffs three times in the SPHL, advancing to the league finals in 2007 and 2008. They ceased operations after the 2007–2008 season after being unable to secure a suitable venue for the upcoming season.

== History ==
=== ACHL and WHA2 ===
The Barracudas began play in the second Atlantic Coast Hockey League (ACHL) in the 2002–03 season. Their original owner was David Waronker, who owned three other teams in the league. Jacksonville's first professional hockey team since the Jacksonville Lizard Kings folded in 2000, they played their first home games at the Jacksonville Coliseum. However, the ACHL's instability caused Waronker to lose confidence in the league. After the season, he announced he was withdrawing his four teams and creating a new league, the World Hockey Association 2 (WHA2), which he envisioned as a developmental league for a proposed revival of the World Hockey Association.

Though the revived WHA never took the ice, the WHA2 did play its 2003–04 season. Jacksonville became the fledgling league's most successful team, taking the regular season title and being the only team to draw an average of over 3,000 fans per game. They began the season in the old Jacksonville Coliseum, and moved to the new Jacksonville Veterans Memorial Arena when it was completed. However, the WHA2, which was largely controlled by Waronker, struggled. The Barracudas beat Miami two games to one and then swept Macon two games to none bringing Jacksonville its only professional hockey championship. Shortly thereafter the WHA2 collapsed, and many of its teams joined the new Southern Professional Hockey League (SPHL).

=== SPHL ===
In 2004, a group of Jacksonville investors organized to purchase the Barracudas from Waronker and join the newly formed SPHL. The team ended the 2004–05 season with a third-place finish and a semi-final loss in the playoffs, and finished the 2005–06 season at the bottom of the SPHL standings. Attendance was modest in the first two years in the SPHL; they drew an average of just below 3,000 in 2005–2006. The Barracudas improved both their record and their attendance the following season; under new coach Rick Allain, they finished the regular season sixth in the league with a 25–24–7 record. This qualified them for the 2007 playoffs, where they defeated the Columbus Cottonmouths 3–1 in the semi-final series, vaulting Jacksonville into the SPHL Finals for their first time. They were ultimately defeated by the Fayetteville FireAntz 3–1 in the finals series. Their on-ice success, combined with schedule changes that allowed them to play more home games after football season, saw their attendance improve measurably for the 2006–07 season.

Still, however, management at the 8,500-seat Jacksonville Veterans Memorial Arena worried that the team's revenues were too low to justify the expense of setting up the facility for ice hockey. After the season, the Arena proposed an increase in the Barracudas' yearly lease that was beyond what the team could afford. For the 2007–08 season, they relocated to Jacksonville Ice, a local 900-seat recreational ice rink. They continued their on-ice success, qualifying for the playoffs and advancing to the league finals for the second year in a row, ultimately losing to the Knoxville Ice Bears. However, the new venue was too small for the team to be financially viable, and unable to secure any other arena lease, the Barracudas suspended operations after the season. While team officials believed that an arena of between 3,000 and 6,000 seats would allow the team to be viable, the Barracudas have not returned to the ice since.

== Championships ==
Year	League	Trophy
2003–2004	WHA2	Commissioner's Cup
2003–2004	WHA2	President's Cup
