= Macon Trax =

- City: Macon, Georgia
- League: Atlantic Coast Hockey League (2002–03); World Hockey Association 2 (2003–04); Southern Professional Hockey League (2004–05)
- Founded: 2002
- Home arena: Macon Coliseum
- Colors: Black, Gray, Yellow, White
- Owners: Macon Hockey Club, Inc.
- Head coach: Brian Curran (2002–03); Tom Stewart (2003–05)

The Macon Trax were a minor-league professional ice hockey team based in Macon, Georgia. They played in the low minor league Atlantic Coast Hockey League (2002–03), World Hockey Association 2 (2003–04), and Southern Professional Hockey League (2004–05), playing their home games at the Macon Coliseum. They went to the championship finals in both the WHA2 and the SPHL, losing in each series to the league champion. This history prompted head coach Tommy Stewart to tell the Macon Telegraph that the team was "always a bridesmaid, never a bride."

The Trax were one of eight minor league hockey teams purchased or founded by real estate mogul David Waronker starting in 2003. By January 2007 all but one of those teams had ceased operations. Following the termination of the Trax in 2005, the team's players were dispersed by draft to the Pee Dee Cyclones and Florida Seals, two new teams entering the SPHL for the 2005–06 season. Stewart was given a coaching contract with the Florida team, which lost in the 2006 SPHL finals. The Seals would later suspend operations in January 2007.

Nearly a decade after the Trax folded, the SPHL returned to Macon during the 2015–16 season. The new team, the Macon Mayhem, was formerly known as the Augusta RiverHawks. The RiverHawks relocated to Macon after the ice refrigeration system at the James Brown Arena malfunctioned in late February 2013, forcing the team to suspend its operations.

== 2004–2005 season roster ==
- Tom Wilson
- Lou Dimasi
- Chris Davidson
- Art Mnatsakanov
- Bob Macmillan
- Chris Duggan
- Steve Zoryk
- Craig Miller
- Jeff Roukes
- Mark Allen
- John Gurskis
- Edan Welch
- Dominick Dawes
- Casey Handrahan
- Craig Geerlinks
- Mark Cairns
- Ryan Rivard
- David Deeves
- Terry Denike
