= Atlantic Coast Hockey League (2002–03) =

- Sport: Ice hockey
- Founded: 2002
- Ceased: 2003
- No. of teams: 6
- Last champion: Orlando Seals

The Atlantic Coast Hockey League was a professional minor league ice hockey league based in the United States. The second league to bear the name Atlantic Coast Hockey League, it operated for only one season, 2002–2003, before its franchises split into two new leagues.

== History ==
The 2002 incarnation of the Atlantic Coast Hockey League was the second organization to bear this name, after the original Atlantic Coast Hockey League, the early 1980s predecessor of the East Coast Hockey League. The ACHL would last only one season, and was notable for the early-season move of the St. Petersburg Parrots to Winston-Salem, North Carolina. After a bitter split among the franchises, the league split into two new leagues, the South East Hockey League and World Hockey Association 2. Surviving franchises would later rejoin each other for the 2004–05 season in the Southern Professional Hockey League.

The Orlando Seals won the ACHL's only regular season and playoff championships.

== Teams ==
- Cape Fear Fire Antz (moved to SEHL for 2003–04)
- Jacksonville Barracudas (moved to WHA2 for 2003–04)
- Knoxville Ice Bears (moved to SEHL for 2003–04)
- Macon Trax (moved to WHA2 for 2003–04)
- Orlando Seals (moved to WHA2 for 2003–04)
- St. Pete/Winston-Salem Parrots (relocated from St. Petersburg to Winston-Salem on November 30, 2002; folded after the season)
- Tallahassee Tide (team intended to play the 2002–03 season but never secured a lease)

Two expansion teams were planned for the 2003–04 season, before the league folded:

- Huntsville Channel Cats (played in the SEHL)
- Miami Manatees (played in the WHA2)

== League split ==
After the 2002–03 season, David Waronker, who owned four of the ACHL's teams in whole or in part, announced he would be founding a new league the following year. This was the World Hockey Association 2, which was envisioned as a developmental league to a revived World Hockey Association. Waronker's teams, the Jacksonville Barracudas, the Macon Trax, the Orlando Seals, and the ACHL expansion team, the Miami Manatees, joined this new league; they were joined by the Lakeland Loggerheads and the Alabama Slammers. The Cape Fear Fire Antz and the Knoxville Ice Bears joined the SEHL with the Huntsville Channel Cats (who were also briefly an ACHL expansion team), the Tupelo T-Rex (who never played due to contractual issues with a previous professional league), and eventually the Winston-Salem T-Birds (who began the season known as the Winston-Salem Hockey Club) as the 4th team.

== Final standings ==
=== Regular season ===
| Team | GP | W | L | OTL | GF | GA | Pts |
|---|---|---|---|---|---|---|---|
| Orlando Seals | 59 | 43 | 14 | 2 | 235 | 158 | 88 |
| Knoxville Ice Bears | 59 | 36 | 21 | 2 | 231 | 186 | 74 |
| Macon Trax | 59 | 31 | 25 | 3 | 214 | 202 | 65 |
| St. Pete/Winston-Salem Parrots | 57 | 28 | 23 | 6 | 171 | 174 | 62 |
| Cape Fear Fire Antz | 60 | 21 | 37 | 3 | 180 | 243 | 44 |
| Jacksonville Barracudas | 60 | 18 | 41 | 1 | 180 | 248 | 37 |

=== Playoffs ===
Semifinals
1 | Orlando Seals | 3 | 4 | 1 | x | x
3 | Macon Trax | 2 | 3 | 0 | x | x
4 | St. Pete/Winston-Salem Parrots | 0 | 1 | 0 | x | x
2 | Knoxville Ice Bears | 1 | 3 | 3 | x | x

Final
1 | Orlando Seals | 2 | 3 | 8 | x | x
2 | Knoxville Ice Bears | 1 | 1 | 1 | x | x

==== Final ====
All times are local (EST)

| March 26, 2003; 7:00 pm | Knoxville | 1 – 2 (1–1, 0–1, 0–0) | Orlando | TD Waterhouse Centre, Orlando, FL |

Game reference

Fred Beaubein
Goalies
David Goverde

| Gatis Tsplis (Savchenko, Desjarlais) - pp - 5:39 | 1 – 0 |
| | 1 – 1 | 10:36 - Todd Nowicki (Sanderson, White) |
| | 1 – 2 | 6:03 - Louis Goulet (Nowicki, Lipuma) |

4 min
Penalties
8 min
32
Shots
29

| March 28, 2003; 7:30 pm | Knoxville | 1 – 3 (0–1, 0–1, 1–1) | Orlando | TD Waterhouse Centre, Orlando, FL |

Game reference

Fred Beaubien
Goalies
David Goverde

| | 0 – 1 | 19:30 - Todd Nowicki (Goulet, White) |
| | 0 – 2 | 1:05 - Terry Ryan (Seroski) |
| Jim Bermingham (Desjarlais, Rodriguez) - 0:52 | 1 – 2 |
| | 1 – 3 | 19:49 - en - Terry Ryan (Goulet, Stephens) |

4 min
Penalties
2 min
34
Shots
30

| March 29, 2003; 7:30 pm | Orlando | 8 – 1 (5–0, 2–1, 1–0) | Knoxville | James White Civic Coliseum, Knoxville, TN; Attendance: 3,258 |

Game reference

David Goverde
Goalies
Fred Beaubien (out 11:42 1st)
Jason Tapp (in 11:42 1st)

| Louie Goulet (Stephens) - 2:57 | 1 – 0 |
| Mark White - 4:28 | 2 – 0 |
| Brad Federenko (Ryan, Sanderson) - 5:29 | 3 – 0 |
| Brad Federenko (Seroski) - 11:24 | 4 – 0 |
| Terry Ryan - 11:42 | 5 – 0 |
| | 5 – 1 | 4:10 - Todd MacIsaac (Alepin, Rodriguez) |
| B.J. Stephens (Johnson) - 4:45 | 6 – 1 |
| Terry Ryan (White, Federenko) - 9:55 | 7 – 1 |
| Darcy Johnson (Goulet, Stephens) - 8:28 | 8 – 1 |

2 min
Penalties
2 min
37
Shots
16

== See also ==
- List of developmental and minor sports leagues
- List of ice hockey leagues
