= SPHL =

Ice hockey league of the Eastern United States

- Current season, competition or edition: 2026–27 SPHL season
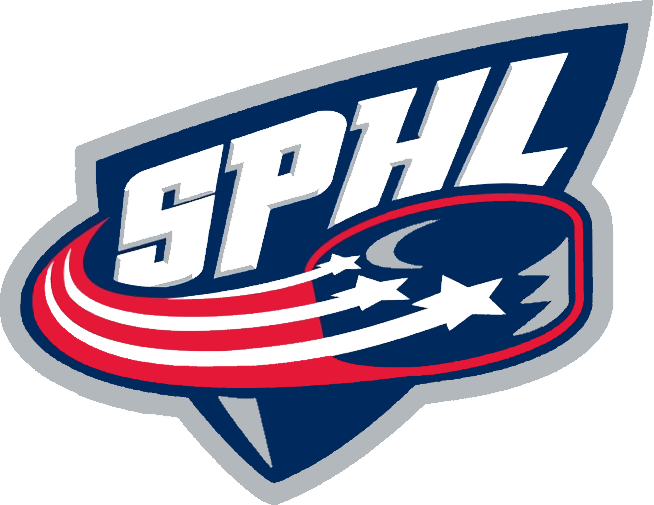
- Sport: Ice hockey
- Founded: 2004
- Commissioner: Doug Price
- No. of teams: 12 (13 in 2027-28 Season)
- Country: United States
- Most recent champions: Evansville Thunderbolts (2026)
- Most titles: Knoxville Ice Bears and Pensacola Ice Flyers (4 each)
- Broadcaster: FloSports
- Website: thesphl.com

The SPHL (formerly the Southern Professional Hockey League) is a professional ice hockey independent minor league based in Huntersville, North Carolina, with teams located primarily in the southeastern United States as well as Illinois and Indiana in the midwestern United States.

Following the 2025-26 season, the Evansville Thunderbolts are the reigning President's Cup champions. As of 2024, the Knoxville Ice Bears are the most successful team in SPHL history, having won five William B. Coffey Trophies as the regular season champions and four President's Cup playoff championships. The Peoria Rivermen have also won five William B. Coffey Trophies, while Pensacola has also won four President's Cups.

== History ==
The SPHL's history traces back to three other short-lived leagues. The Atlantic Coast Hockey League started play in the 2002–03 season. After its only season, the ACHL dissolved with member teams forming the nucleus for two rival leagues, the South East Hockey League and the World Hockey Association 2. After one season, the SEHL and WHA2 disbanded, with their surviving teams rejoining with two expansion teams to form the SPHL, commencing with the 2004–05 season.

In 2009, the SPHL saw a large expansion with three new franchises, in Biloxi, Mississippi, Lafayette, Louisiana and Pensacola, Florida. In 2010, the league added an expansion team in Augusta, Georgia, another former long time ECHL market. For the 2011–12 season, the league added two-time Central Hockey League champions, the Mississippi RiverKings. For the 2013–14 season, the league lost the Augusta RiverHawks but also expanded northward with two franchises in Illinois: the Bloomington Thunder, a team also moving from the CHL, where they were known as the Bloomington Blaze, and the Peoria Rivermen, who were replacing an American Hockey League team of the same name in their market. In 2015, the Augusta franchise returned and relocated to Macon, Georgia as the Macon Mayhem.

In November 2014, Shannon Szabados became the first female goaltender to win an SPHL game, when the Columbus Cottonmouths defeated the Fayetteville FireAntz 5–4 in overtime. In that same game Erin Blair and Katie Guay became the first female officials to referee an SPHL game.

At the end of the 2015–16 season, the Louisiana IceGators announced a one-year leave of absence for renovations to their arena but never returned. The IceGators' franchise was sold and reactivated as the Quad City Storm in 2018. Then in 2016, the dormant Mississippi Surge franchise was relocated to Southwest Virginia to become the Roanoke Rail Yard Dawgs. One of the inaugural SPHL teams, the Columbus Cottonmouths, suspended operations in 2017 after failing to find a buyer while an expansion team called the Birmingham Bulls were accepted into the league as the tenth team. Following the 2017–18 season, the Mississippi RiverKings suspended operations while the league searched for new owners. With the acceptance of the Quad City Storm, the league was able to remain at ten teams for the 2018–19 season.

Due to the COVID-19 pandemic, the 2019–20 season was curtailed and no champion was named. The following season, the league announced it would only play with five of the ten member teams due to pandemic-related capacity restrictions barring fans from attending games. During the season, the league approved of the Vermilion County Bobcats as a 2021–22 expansion team based in Danville, Illinois. The Bobcats folded after only a year and a half.

In 2023, the league rebranded to the orphaned initialism "SPHL" to reflect the fact that the league's footprint had expanded beyond the southern United States.

On September 17, 2025, it was announced that Mobile will be joining the league for the 2027–28 season.

In May 2026, the Athens Rock Lobsters and the Pee Dee IceCats of the FPHL announced that they would be joining the SPHL for the 2026-27 season.

== Teams ==
=== Map ===
Teams currently in the SPHL.
- Current teams
- Future teams

=== 2026–27 members ===
Overview of SPHL teams
Team	Location	Arena	Capacity	Founded	Joined	Head Coach
Athens Rock Lobsters	Athens, Georgia	Akins Ford Arena	5,500	2024	2026	Scott Burt
Birmingham Bulls	Pelham, Alabama	Pelham Civic Center	4,100	2017		Craig Simchuk
Evansville Thunderbolts	Evansville, Indiana	Ford Center	9,000	2016		Jeff Bes
Fayetteville Marksmen	Fayetteville, North Carolina	Crown Coliseum	9,500	2002	2004	Garrett Rutledge
Huntsville Havoc	Huntsville, Alabama	Von Braun Center	6,050	2004		Stuart Stefan
Knoxville Ice Bears	Knoxville, Tennessee	Knoxville Civic Coliseum	5,109	2002	2004	John Gurskis
Macon Mayhem	Macon, Georgia	Macon Coliseum	6,550	2010 (Note: Relocated franchise)		Dave Pszenyczny
Pee Dee IceCats	Florence, South Carolina	Florence Center	7,526	2023	2026	Chris Bernard
Pensacola Ice Flyers	Pensacola, Florida	Pensacola Bay Center	8,150	2009		Jeremy Gates
Peoria Rivermen	Peoria, Illinois	Carver Arena	9,815	2013		Jean-Guy Trudel
Quad City Storm	Moline, Illinois	Vibrant Arena at The MARK	9,200	2009		Shayne Toporowski
Roanoke Rail Yard Dawgs	Roanoke, Virginia	Berglund Center	8,672	2009		Dan Bremner

==== Future teams ====
Overview of SPHL teams
Team	City	Arena	Capacity	Founded	Joined	Head Coach
Mobile Mysticks	Mobile, Alabama	Regions Arena	10,275	2025	2027	TBD

=== Defunct and relocated teams ===
- Asheville Aces (2004–05)
- Augusta RiverHawks (2010–13) Moved to Macon, Georgia, as the Mayhem for the 2015–16 season.
- Bloomington Thunder (2013–14) Membership terminated to make way for a team in the United States Hockey League.
- Columbus Cottonmouths (2004–17) Inaugural member of the SPHL, suspended operations when ownership could no longer fund the team.
- Florida Seals (2005–07) Membership terminated in the middle of the 2006–07 SPHL season.
- Jacksonville Barracudas (2004–08) Suspended for the 2008–09 season and dissolved.
- Louisiana IceGators (2009–16) Suspended operations for the 2016–17 season claiming the arena needed the year for renovations but later dissolved. In 2018, the franchise was sold and became the Quad City Storm.
- Macon Trax (2004–05)
- Mississippi RiverKings (2011–18) Joined from the Central Hockey League in 2011, ownership suspended operations in 2018.
- Mississippi Surge (2009–14) Moved to Roanoke, Virginia, as the Rail Yard Dawgs for the 2016–17 season.
- Pee Dee Cyclones (2005–07) Moved to Winston-Salem, North Carolina.
- Richmond Renegades (2006–09)
- Twin City Cyclones (2007–09)
- Vermilion County Bobcats (2021–23) Ceased operations on February 9, 2023, after 88 games played.
- Winston-Salem Polar Twins (2004–05)

== Key rule differences ==
As per minor leagues, there are some rule differences between the SPHL and the NHL (and even the ECHL and the AHL, the two official developmental leagues regulated by the Professional Hockey Players' Association).

- A team may dress nineteen players to a game. Two players dressed for the game will be goaltenders.
- A mouthpiece is required for all players except the goaltender.
- No curvature of stick limitations as in the NHL, AHL, and ECHL.

== Champions ==
=== President's Cup ===
Awarded to the league playoff champion.

Season	Winner	Runner-up
2005	Columbus Cottonmouths	Macon Trax
2006	Knoxville Ice Bears	Orlando Seals
2007	Fayetteville FireAntz	Jacksonville Barracudas
2008	Knoxville Ice Bears	Jacksonville Barracudas
2009	Knoxville Ice Bears	Fayetteville FireAntz
2010	Huntsville Havoc	Mississippi Surge
2011	Mississippi Surge	Augusta Riverhawks
2012	Columbus Cottonmouths	Pensacola Ice Flyers
2013	Pensacola Ice Flyers	Huntsville Havoc
2014	Pensacola Ice Flyers	Columbus Cottonmouths
2015	Knoxville Ice Bears	Mississippi RiverKings
2016	Pensacola Ice Flyers	Peoria Rivermen
2017	Macon Mayhem	Peoria Rivermen
2018	Huntsville Havoc	Peoria Rivermen
2019	Huntsville Havoc	Birmingham Bulls
2020	Not awarded due to the COVID-19 pandemic	
2021	Pensacola Ice Flyers	Macon Mayhem
2022	Peoria Rivermen	Roanoke Rail Yard Dawgs
2023	Roanoke Rail Yard Dawgs	Birmingham Bulls
2024	Peoria Rivermen	Huntsville Havoc
2025	Evansville Thunderbolts	Knoxville Ice Bears
2026	Evansville Thunderbolts	Peoria Rivermen

Team	Titles
Knoxville Ice Bears	4
Pensacola Ice Flyers	4
Huntsville Havoc	3
Peoria Rivermen	2
Columbus Cottonmouths	2
Evansville Thunderbolts	2
Fayetteville FireAntz	1
Macon Mayhem	1
Mississippi Surge	1
Roanoke Rail Yard Dawgs	1

=== William B. Coffey Trophy ===
Originally known as the Commissioner's Cup, the regular season championship trophy was renamed in honor of league co-founder Bill Coffey during the 2007–08 season.

Season	Winner	Title
2004–05	Knoxville Ice Bears	1
2005–06	Knoxville Ice Bears	2
2006–07	Columbus Cottonmouths	1
2007–08	Knoxville Ice Bears	3
2008–09	Knoxville Ice Bears	4
2009–10	Mississippi Surge	1
2010–11	Mississippi Surge	2
2011–12	Augusta RiverHawks	1
2012–13	Fayetteville FireAntz	1
2013–14	Pensacola Ice Flyers	1
2014–15	Peoria Rivermen	1
2015–16	Peoria Rivermen	2
2016–17	Macon Mayhem	1
2017–18	Peoria Rivermen	3
2018–19	Peoria Rivermen	4
2019–20	Not awarded due to season cancellation	
2020–21	Macon Mayhem	2
2021–22	Knoxville Ice Bears	5
2022–23	Peoria Rivermen	5
2023–24	Birmingham Bulls	1
2024–25	Peoria Rivermen	6
2025-26	Peoria Rivermen	7

Team	Titles
Peoria Rivermen	7
Knoxville Ice Bears	5
Macon Mayhem	2
Mississippi Surge	2
Augusta Riverhawks	1
Columbus Cottonmouths	1
Fayetteville FireAntz	1
Pensacola Ice Flyers	1
Birmingham Bulls	1

== See also ==
- List of developmental and minor sports leagues
- List of ice hockey leagues
- Minor league
