= World Hockey Association 2 =

American minor hockey league, 2003–04

- Sport: Ice hockey
- Founded: 2003
- Folded: 2004
- Commissioner: David Waronker
- No. of teams: 6
- Last champion: Jacksonville Barracudas

The World Hockey Association 2 was a minor professional ice hockey league created at the instigation of the organizers of the proposed recreated World Hockey Association to serve as its development league. The WHA2 teams — some of which had played the 2002–03 season in the Atlantic Coast Hockey League — were all in the southeastern United States. David Waronker was the league's founder and also served as the league's commissioner.

The WHA2 operated in the 2003–04 season only, after which (due to a falling-out with the parent organization) it was served a cease-and-desist from the WHA and ceased operations. David Waronker was credited with both the founding and collapse of the league. In addition he owned or co-owned all of the teams in the league. Its surviving teams merged with survivors of the South East Hockey League to form the Southern Professional Hockey League for the 2004–2005 season.

The Jacksonville Barracudas won the WHA2's first and only President's Cup. Jacksonville also hosted the first and only WHA2 All-Star Game.

== Teams ==
- Orlando Seals (became the Florida Seals for the 2005–06 SPHL season)
- Jacksonville Barracudas (moved to SPHL for 2004–05)
- Macon Trax (moved to SPHL for 2004–05)
- Miami Manatees (folded after 2003–04)
- Lakeland Loggerheads (folded after 2003–04)
- Alabama Slammers (folded after 2003–04)

== 2003–04 season ==
=== Regular season ===
	GP	W	L	OTL	SOL	GF	GA	Pts
Jacksonville Barracudas	59	40	18	1	0	233	175	81
Alabama Slammers	58	34	20	2	2	224	196	72
Macon Trax	56	30	20	3	3	218	193	66
Orlando Seals	57	27	25	2	3	198	197	59
Miami Manatees	48	24	19	4	1	215	213	53
Lakeland Loggerheads	58	13	38	4	3	181	295	33

=== Playoffs ===
Semifinals
1	Jacksonville Barracudas	2
5	Miami Manatees	1
2	Alabama Slammers	0
3	Macon Trax	2

Finals
1	Jacksonville Barracudas	2
3	Macon Trax	0

== See also ==
- List of developmental and minor sports leagues
- List of ice hockey leagues
