= Brad Ralph =

Canadian ice hockey player and coach

- Ralph coaching the Everblades in 2026
- Born: October 17, 1980 (age 45) Ottawa, Ontario, Canada
- Height: 6 ft 2 in (188 cm)
- Weight: 198 lb (90 kg; 14 st 2 lb)
- Position: Left wing
- Shot: Left
- Played for: Phoenix Coyotes
- NHL draft: 53rd overall, 1999; Phoenix Coyotes
- Playing career: 2000–2009

Bradley Ralph (born October 17, 1980) is a Canadian former professional ice hockey left winger and is the head coach of the Florida Everblades of the ECHL. He played in one National Hockey League game for the Phoenix Coyotes during the 2000–01 NHL season.

== Career ==
Ralph skated one game in the NHL with the Phoenix Coyotes. He also played in the ECHL (for the Mississippi Sea Wolves, Augusta Lynx, Dayton Bombers, Columbia Inferno, and Charlotte Checkers) and American Hockey League (for the Springfield Falcons and Hershey Bears) in the United States, as well as a season each for Alleghe HC in Serie A in Italy and AaB Ishockey in the AL-Bank Ligaen in Denmark.

After his playing career, Ralph began coaching hockey, spending two years as head coach for the Augusta RiverHawks in the Southern Professional Hockey League and of the Idaho Steelheads in the ECHL.

On August 4, 2015, Ralph was named head coach of the Western Hockey League's Kelowna Rockets.

On July 12, 2016, he was named the head coach of the Florida Everblades in the ECHL. He was named Coach of the Year for the 2017–18 season.

Ralph guided the Florida Everblades to an ECHL record three consecutive Kelly Cup Championships in 2022, 2023 and 2024, which was the first three-peat in ECHL history.

== Career statistics ==
=== Regular season and playoffs ===
			Regular season					Playoffs
Season	Team	League	GP	G	A	Pts	PIM	GP	G	A	Pts	PIM
1995–96	Kanata Valley Lasers	CJHL	19	6	1	7	19	—	—	—	—	—
1996–97	Kanata Valley Lasers	CJHL	44	13	13	26	63	—	—	—	—	—
1997–98	Oshawa Generals	OHL	59	20	17	37	45	7	2	1	3	8
1998–99	Oshawa Generals	OHL	67	31	44	75	93	16	8	7	15	10
1999–00	Oshawa Generals	OHL	56	28	35	63	68	5	1	1	2	4
2000–01	Phoenix Coyotes	NHL	1	0	0	0	0	—	—	—	—	—
2000–01	Springfield Falcons	AHL	50	5	13	18	23	—	—	—	—	—
2001–02	Mississippi Sea Wolves	ECHL	16	2	3	5	12	—	—	—	—	—
2002–03	Augusta Lynx	ECHL	44	11	15	26	80	—	—	—	—	—
2002–03	Springfield Falcons	AHL	16	2	5	7	6	—	—	—	—	—
2003–04	Dayton Bombers	ECHL	13	5	4	9	16	—	—	—	—	—
2003–04	HC Alleghe	ITA	21	9	9	18	32	3	0	0	0	6
2004–05	Columbia Inferno	ECHL	65	27	26	53	60	5	2	3	5	8
2005–06	AaB Ishockey	DEN	35	8	13	21	78	17	7	1	8	42
2006–07	Columbia Inferno	ECHL	63	20	33	53	108	—	—	—	—	—
2006–07	Hershey Bears	AHL	—	—	—	—	—	1	0	0	0	0
2007–08	Columbia Inferno	ECHL	66	18	31	49	73	5	1	5	6	8
2008–09	Charlotte Checkers	ECHL	28	13	15	28	22	6	0	2	2	12
ECHL totals			295	96	127	222	371	16	3	10	13	28
NHL totals			1	0	0	0	0	—	—	—	—	—

== Head Coaching Record ==
=== ECHL ===
Team	Year	Regular Season						Postseason			
Team	Year	G	W	L	OTL	Pts	Finish	W	L	Win %	Result
IDH	2012–13	72	45	20	7	97	2nd in Mountain	9	8	.529	Lost in Third Round
IDH	2013–14	72	39	26	7	85	3rd in Mountain	5	6	.454	Lost in Second Round
IDH	2014–15	72	48	18	6	102	1st in Pacific	2	4	.333	Lost in First Round
FLA	2016–17	72	46	21	5	97	1st in South	5	7	.416	Lost in Second Round
FLA	2017–18	72	53	13	6	112	1st in South	15	6	.714	Lost in Finals
FLA	2018–19	72	50	16	6	106	1st in South	9	7	.562	Lost in Third Round
FLA	2019–20	62	43	13	6	92	—	—	—	—	—
FLA	2020–21	69	42	19	8	92	1st in East	2	3	.400	Lost in First Round
FLA	2021–22	72	42	20	10	94	1st in South	16	4	.800	Won Championship
FLA	2022–23	72	38	25	9	85	4th in South	16	6	.727	Won Championship
FLA	2023–24	72	40	23	9	89	3rd in South	16	7	.695	Won Championship
FLA	2024–25	72	49	15	8	106	2nd in South	10	5	.667	Lost in Third Round
FLA	2025–26	72	49	13	10	108	1st in South	16	4	.800	Won Championship
Total		923	584	242	97	1,265	—	121	67	.643	12 Playoff Appearances 4 Kelly Cup titles

=== Other ===
Team	Year	League	Regular Season						Postseason			
Team	Year	League	G	W	L	OTL	Pts	Finish	W	L	Win %	Result
AUG	2010–11	SPHL	56	35	21	—	70	2nd	4	5	.444	Lost in Finals
AUG	2011–12	SPHL	56	36	13	7	79	1st	1	2	.333	Lost in First Round
KEL	2015–16	WHL	72	48	20	4	100	2nd	8	10	.444	Lost in Third Round
SPHL Total			112	71	34	7	149	—	5	7	.416	2 Playoff Appearances
WHL Total			72	48	20	4	100	—	8	10	.444	1 Playoff Appearance

== Awards and honours ==
Awards	Year
SPHL Coach of the Year	2010–11
John Brophy Award for ECHL Coach of the Year	2017–18

== See also ==
- List of players who played only one game in the NHL
