= Scott Darling =

American ice hockey player (born 1988)

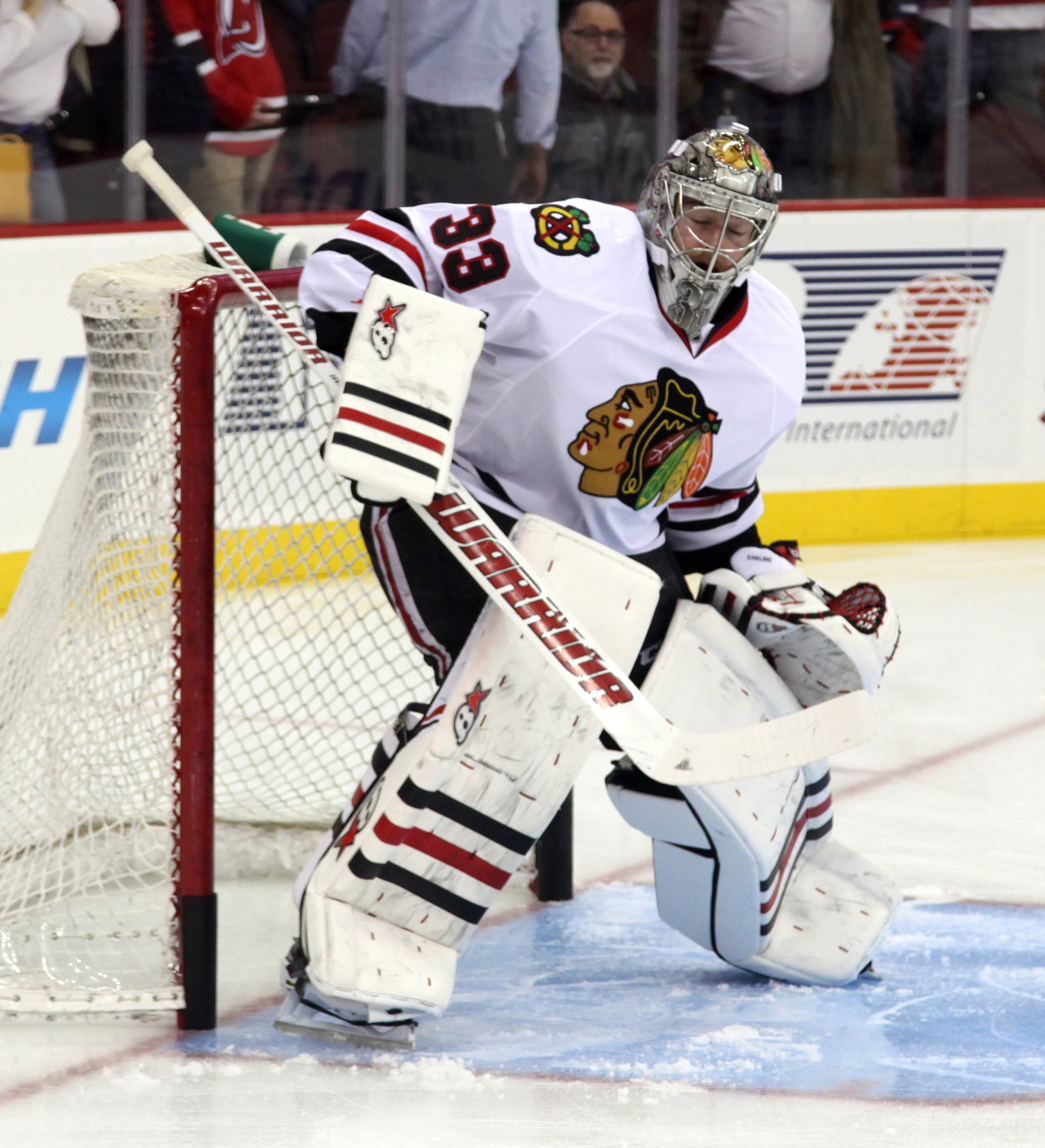
- Darling with the Chicago Blackhawks in December 2014
- Born: December 22, 1988 (age 37) Newport News, Virginia, U.S.
- Height: 6 ft 6 in (198 cm)
- Weight: 232 lb (105 kg; 16 st 8 lb)
- Position: Goaltender
- Caught: Left
- Played for: Chicago Blackhawks; Carolina Hurricanes; HC TWK Innsbruck
- National team: United States
- NHL draft: 153rd overall, 2007; Phoenix Coyotes
- Playing career: 2010–2021

Scott Darling (born December 22, 1988) is an American former professional ice hockey goaltender. He previously played in the National Hockey League (NHL) for the Chicago Blackhawks and Carolina Hurricanes. Darling was selected by the Phoenix Coyotes in the sixth round, 153rd overall, of the 2007 NHL entry draft.

Darling won the Stanley Cup as a member of the Blackhawks in 2015, becoming the first Chicago-area native player to do so as a member of the Blackhawks.

== Playing career ==
=== Amateur ===
Darling grew up in Chicago's southern suburb of Lemont, Illinois, and as a child idolized the Chicago Blackhawks goaltender Ed Belfour. He played minor ice hockey with the AA Vikings (Orland Park), AA Huskies (then Darien, now Romeoville) and AAA Team Illinois and Chicago Young Americans. He played in the 2002 Quebec International Pee-Wee Hockey Tournament with the Chicago Young Americans. He attended Notre Dame College in Wilcox, Saskatchewan, in eighth grade and played AAA hockey for the Hounds. He attended Lemont High School.

Prior to turning professional, Darling attended the University of Maine, where he played two seasons of NCAA Men's Division I Ice Hockey with the Black Bears ice hockey team. At the University of Maine, he was involved in excessive partying and by his sophomore year was abusing alcohol. He frequently violated the school's code of conduct and was given three suspensions from the hockey team within a 16-month period, resulting in him being dropped.

=== Minor leagues ===
After bouncing around for several years through various minor hockey leagues, his goaltender coach Brian Daccord said he was not permitted to play at his hockey school until he made a dedicated commitment to the gym. It was at this time, he lost nearly 40 pounds and gave up alcohol in 2011. Darling said even at the lowest point, after being cut from what might have been the worst team in organized hockey, he never forgot something his father told him about getting ahead: "It was kind of like his motto—'Saw the wood that's in front of you.' "

In the 2013–14 season, Darling enjoyed his most successful American Hockey League (AHL) season, earning 13 wins in 26 games with the Milwaukee Admirals.

=== Chicago Blackhawks ===
On July 1, 2014, the Chicago Blackhawks signed Darling as a free agent to his first NHL contract on a one-year deal. Darling made his NHL debut on October 26, 2014, against the Ottawa Senators, making 32 saves in the 2–1 win. He became the first former Southern Professional Hockey League (SPHL) player to play in an NHL game. On November 1, 2014, it was announced Darling had been reassigned to the Blackhawks' AHL affiliate, the Rockford IceHogs, following starting goaltender Corey Crawford's recovery from an undisclosed upper-body injury. However, Darling was recalled two weeks later, on November 15, 2014. On February 22, 2015, Darling was promoted from Rockford and placed onto Chicago's NHL roster, replacing Antti Raanta as the team's backup goaltender, who himself was demoted to Rockford. The Blackhawks also signed Darling to a two-year contract extension. On March 18, 2015, Darling recorded his first NHL shutout in a Blackhawks' 1–0 victory over the New York Rangers. On April 15, 2015, Darling recorded his first playoff win after replacing Crawford in net, making 42 saves, with the Blackhawks defeating the Nashville Predators 4–3 in double overtime. Darling set an NHL record in his debut for the longest relief appearance without allowing a goal (67:44), as well as the most saves in relief without allowing a goal (42). On June 15, 2015, Darling became the first Chicago-area native player to win a Stanley Cup with the Blackhawks.

=== Carolina Hurricanes ===
On April 28, 2017, at the conclusion of the Blackhawks season in 2016–17, Darling's rights as a pending free agent were traded to the Carolina Hurricanes in exchange for the Ottawa Senators' original third-round pick in the 2017 NHL entry draft. On May 6, 2017, Darling agreed to terms with the Hurricanes on a four-year contract. His first season with Carolina was underwhelming, as he recorded a 13–21–7 record with a 3.18 goals against average (GAA).

On November 29, 2018, the Hurricanes placed Darling on waivers. At that point, he had a .892 save percentage in seven appearances for the club. He cleared the following day, and joined the Hurricanes' AHL affiliate, the Charlotte Checkers. On February 10, 2019, Darling was granted a "personal leave of absence" from the Charlotte Checkers and the Hurricanes organization for an undetermined period of time.

On June 30, 2019, Darling and a 2020 sixth-round draft pick were traded to Florida Panthers in exchange for James Reimer. He was subsequently placed on unconditional waivers for the purpose of buying out the final two years of his contract.

=== Innsbruck HC ===
Darling signed with Innsbruck HC of the Austrian Hockey League in November 2019. He abruptly returned to the United States in March 2020 following the onset of the coronavirus pandemic in Europe. Darling appeared in 33 contests for Innsbruck, where he posted a 3.34 GAA and .898 save percentage prior to his departure.

=== Return to North America ===
As a free agent, Darling returned from Austria and agreed to a professional tryout contract to attend the Florida Panthers training camp on January 2, 2021. With the Panthers under the leadership of former Chicago Blackhawks coach Joel Quenneville, Darling was subsequently released without a contract at the conclusion of camp.

On January 26, Darling returned to the roots of his past success in joining the Blackhawks, signing a professional tryout contract (PTO) with the Rockford IceHogs of the AHL, to begin the 2020–21 season. He made a lone appearance in his return to the IceHogs on February 9, allowing five goals on 27 shots. Darling was released from his PTO with the IceHogs on February 17, 2021. He retired from professional hockey after his release. Darling reflected on his career, stating, "I grew up in Chicago, I've been a 'Hawks fan my entire life, I still am a 'Hawks fan. It meant the world to me. My family went to the parade in 2010, I watched 2013 with my mom on her couch and being on the 2015 team and helping them along, oh my God, it makes me emotional just talking about it."

== International play ==
Medal record

Representing United States

Ice hockey

World Championships
Bronze medal – third place	2018 Denmark	

Darling played for the United States in the 2018 IIHF World Championship, mainly serving as the backup to Keith Kinkaid. He recorded featured in two wins in as many games with a 2.25 GAA and a .870 save percentage. On May 20, the United States defeated Canada 4–1 to win the bronze medal.

Darling played in the Wayne Gretzky Ice Hockey Classic for Team USA in the summer of 2016 in Australia.

== Post-retirement career ==
According to Darling, he was depressed for six months after his retirement, until he began doing stand-up comedy. Darling was recognized by a comedian at Chicago's Laugh Factory comedy club who encouraged Darling to try and open for him. By summer 2022, he toured with comedian Ian Bagg and performed multiple shows in Raleigh. Darling became a studio analyst for Blackhawks coverage on NBC Sports Chicago in October 2022.

== Personal life ==
Born in Newport News, Virginia, Darling is the son of a former Army officer who was stationed at Fort Lewis, Washington and Fort Rucker, Alabama before the family finally settled in the Chicago suburb of Lemont.

In February 2016, Darling helped a homeless man in Arizona by buying him groceries and renting him a hotel room for the month. The story went viral after Darling's Uber driver shared it with the media. Darling's deed was recognized by President Barack Obama during the Blackhawks' visit to the White House later that month, who recounted the story and praised Darling for his generosity.

== Career statistics ==
			Regular season									Playoffs
Season	Team	League	GP	W	L	T/OT	Min	GA	SO	GAA	SV%	GP	W	L	Min	GA	SO	GAA	SV%
2005–06	North Iowa Outlaws	NAHL	8	2	4	0	405	28	0	4.15	.888	—	—	—	—	—	—	—	—
2006–07	North Iowa Outlaws	NAHL	1	0	0	0	15	3	0	12.00	.786	—	—	—	—	—	—	—	—
2006–07	Capital District Selects	EJHL	22	9	9	3	1,242	70	1	3.38	.924	—	—	—	—	—	—	—	—
2007–08	Indiana Ice	USHL	42	27	10	2	2,391	121	1	3.04	.908	3	1	2	179	11	0	3.69	.889
2008–09	University of Maine	HE	27	10	14	3	1,566	72	3	2.76	.895	—	—	—	—	—	—	—	—
2009–10	University of Maine	HE	27	15	6	3	1,511	78	0	3.10	.895	—	—	—	—	—	—	—	—
2010–11	Louisiana IceGators	SPHL	30	6	22	0	1,598	102	0	3.83	.892	—	—	—	—	—	—	—	—
2011–12	Mississippi RiverKings	SPHL	35	15	17	1	2,055	100	1	2.92	.905	1	0	1	59	5	0	5.12	.762
2011–12	Florida Everblades	ECHL	1	0	1	0	58	5	0	5.14	.773	—	—	—	—	—	—	—	—
2011–12	Wichita Thunder	CHL	1	0	1	0	60	4	0	4.01	.840	—	—	—	—	—	—	—	—
2012–13	Wheeling Nailers	ECHL	32	13	12	4	1,819	85	2	2.80	.907	—	—	—	—	—	—	—	—
2012–13	Hamilton Bulldogs	AHL	1	0	0	0	25	0	0	0.00	1.000	—	—	—	—	—	—	—	—
2013–14	Milwaukee Admirals	AHL	26	13	6	2	1,347	45	6	2.00	.933	—	—	—	—	—	—	—	—
2013–14	Cincinnati Cyclones	ECHL	6	4	1	1	368	16	0	2.61	.916	—	—	—	—	—	—	—	—
2014–15	Rockford Icehogs	AHL	26	14	8	0	1,419	52	2	2.20	.927	—	—	—	—	—	—	—	—
2014–15	Chicago Blackhawks	NHL	14	9	4	0	833	27	1	1.94	.936	5	3	1	298	11	0	2.28	.936
2015–16	Chicago Blackhawks	NHL	29	12	8	3	1,551	67	1	2.58	.915	—	—	—	—	—	—	—	—
2016–17	Chicago Blackhawks	NHL	32	18	5	5	1,689	67	2	2.38	.924	—	—	—	—	—	—	—	—
2017–18	Carolina Hurricanes	NHL	43	13	21	7	2,476	131	0	3.18	.888	—	—	—	—	—	—	—	—
2018–19	Carolina Hurricanes	NHL	8	2	4	2	486	27	0	3.33	.884	—	—	—	—	—	—	—	—
2018–19	Charlotte Checkers	AHL	14	5	6	2	742	42	0	3.40	.882	—	—	—	—	—	—	—	—
2019–20	HC TWK Innsbruck	EBEL	33	9	24	0	1923	107	0	3.34	.898	—	—	—	—	—	—	—	—
2020–21	Rockford IceHogs	AHL	1	0	1	0	60	5	0	5.00	.815	—	—	—	—	—	—	—	—
NHL totals			126	54	42	18	7,042	319	4	2.72	.908	5	3	1	298	11	0	2.28	.936

=== International ===
Year	Team	Event	Result	GP	W	L	OT	MIN	GA	SO	GAA	SV%
2018	United States	WC	3rd place, bronze medalist(s)	2	1	0	0	80	3	0	2.25	.870
Senior totals				2	1	0	0	80	3	0	2.25	.870

== Awards and honors ==
Award	Year
NHL
Stanley Cup (Chicago Blackhawks)	2015
