= 2013–14 SPHL season =

- League: Southern Professional Hockey League
- Sport: Ice hockey
- Duration: October 25, 2013–April 12, 2014

Regular season
- Season champions: Pensacola Ice Flyers
- Season MVP: (Canada) Shawn McNeil (Louisiana)
- Top scorer: (Canada) Shawn McNeil (Louisiana)

Playoffs
- Finals champions: Pensacola Ice Flyers
- Finals runners-up: Columbus Cottonmouths
- Playoffs MVP: (Canada) Brett Lutes (Pensacola)

SPHL seasons
- ← 2012–13 2014–15 →

The 2013–14 Southern Professional Hockey League season is the 10th season of the Southern Professional Hockey League (SPHL). The Pensacola Ice Flyers defeated the Columbus Cottonmouths in the President's Cup final 2 games to none to repeat as winners of the President's Cup.

== Preseason ==
The Augusta RiverHawks have suspended operations for the 2013-14 season due to the failure of the ice system at the James Brown Arena. Team officials, the city of Augusta, and Global Spectrum could not reach an agreement on repairing or replacing the JBA's ice system in time for the club to commit to the forthcoming season.

On May 15, 2013, it was announced that the CHL's Bloomington Thunder (formerly known as the Blaze), and the AHL's Peoria Rivermen, would move to the Southern Professional Hockey League for the 2013–14 season. The Rivermen had been notified that the Vancouver Canucks, who had purchased the team a month earlier, would not keep them in Peoria. The two teams will reportedly be owned by two former Rivermen executives, John Butler, Bart Rogers and David Holt with financial backing from former Rivermen owner Bruce Saurs.

== Teams ==
2013-14 Southern Professional Hockey League
Team	City	Arena
Bloomington Thunder	Bloomington, Illinois	U.S. Cellular Coliseum
Columbus Cottonmouths	Columbus, Georgia	Columbus Civic Center
Fayetteville FireAntz	Fayetteville, North Carolina	Cumberland County Crown Coliseum
Huntsville Havoc	Huntsville, Alabama	Von Braun Center
Knoxville Ice Bears	Knoxville, Tennessee	Knoxville Civic Coliseum
Louisiana IceGators	Lafayette, Louisiana	Cajundome
Mississippi RiverKings	Southaven, Mississippi	Landers Center
Mississippi Surge	Biloxi, Mississippi	Mississippi Coast Coliseum
Pensacola Ice Flyers	Pensacola, Florida	Pensacola Bay Center
Peoria Rivermen	Peoria, Illinois	Carver Arena

== Map of teams ==
SPHL teams

== Regular season ==
=== Standings ===
Team	GP	W	L	OTL	GF	GA	Pts
Pensacola Ice Flyers^{‡}	56	38	13	5	207	139	81
Louisiana IceGators	56	35	18	3	198	175	73
Peoria Rivermen	56	30	18	8	154	144	68
Mississippi RiverKings	56	31	21	4	175	150	66
Huntsville Havoc	56	31	21	4	180	158	66
Columbus Cottonmouths	56	27	26	3	183	173	57
Knoxville Ice Bears	56	25	24	7	157	163	57
Mississippi Surge	56	22	28	6	140	186	50
Fayetteville FireAntz	56	21	30	5	144	183	47
Bloomington Thunder	56	20	33	3	125	192	43

^{‡} William B. Coffey Trophy winners
Advanced to playoffs

After games of March 22, 2014

=== Attendance ===
Team	Total	Games	Average
Pensacola	114,537	28	4,090
Huntsville	103,993	28	3,714
Peoria	98,176	28	3,506
Knoxville	95,556	28	3,412
Fayetteville	88,623	28	3,165
Columbus	76,618	28	2,736
MS RiverKings	70,991	28	2,535
Louisiana	66,438	28	2,372
Bloomington	66,025	28	2,358
MS Surge	59,277	28	2,117
League	840,234	280	3,000

After games of March 22, 2014

== President's Cup playoffs ==
First Round
1	Pensacola Ice Flyers	5	4*	X
8	Mississippi Surge	1	3	X
4	Mississippi RiverKings	4	2	3
5	Huntsville Havoc	2	4	5
(Pairings are reseeded after the first round)
6	Columbus Cottonmouths	0	6	4
3	Peoria Rivermen	2	1	1
7	Knoxville Ice Bears	3	3*	X
2	Louisiana IceGators	0	2	X

Semifinals
1	Pensacola Ice Flyers	0	3	2
7	Knoxville Ice Bears	2	1	1
5	Huntsville Havoc	0	2	X
6	Columbus Cottonmouths	1	4	X

Final
1	Pensacola Ice Flyers	9	5	X
6	Columbus Cottonmouths	1	1	X

* indicates overtime period.

=== Finals ===
All times are local (EDT/CDT)

April 10, 2014; 7:05pm	Columbus	1 - 9 (0-3, 1-3, 0-3)	Pensacola	Pensacola Civic Center; Pensacola, Florida; Attendance: 4,266

Game reference

Andrew Loewen, Shannon Szabados
Goalies
Ross MacKinnon
Referees:
Pete MacDougall
Mike Sheehan

	0–1	Ryan Salvis (Jeremy Gates, John Dunbar) 0:31
	0–2	Brett Lutes (Joe Caveney) 1:41
Will Aide (Alex Gallant, Chris Bailer) 1:56	1–2
	1–3	Ryan Salvis (Keegan Flaherty) 2:36
	1–4	Joe Caveney (Mitchell Good, Steve Bergin) 8:08
	1–5	Adam Pawlick (Ryan Salvis, John Dunbar) 15:20
	1–6	Corey Banfield (unassisted) 16:55
	1–7	Brett Lutes (power play) (Jeremy Gates, Adam Pawlick) 1:56
	1–8	Joe Caveney (power play) (Tyler Amburgey, Corey Banfield) 9:27
	1–9	Mitchell Good (Brett Lutes, Drew Baker) 10:00

10 min
Penalties
10 min
29
Shots
33

April 12, 2014; 7:30pm	Pensacola	5 - 1 (2-1, 3-0, 0-0)	Columbus	Columbus Civic Center; Columbus, Georgia; Attendance: 4,127

Game reference

Ross MacKinnon
Goalies
Andrew Loewen
Referees:
Ken Anderson
Pete MacDougall

Brett Lutes (Steve Bergin, Drew Baker) 2:18	1–0
Brett Lutes (Drew Baker) 7:43	2–0
Corey Banfield (Tyler Amburgey, Paul Rodrigues) 8:21	3–0
Corey Banfield (Steve Whitely, Paul Rodrigues) 11:15	4–0
	4–1	Preston Shupe (Jason Gray) 11:35
John Dunbar (power play) (Jeremy Gates, Ryan Salvis) 16:50	5–1

17 min
Penalties
19 min
30
Shots
22

== Awards ==
The SPHL All-Rookie team was announced on March 26, 2014, the All-SPHL teams on March 27, 2014, the Easton Defensemen of the Year on March 28, 2014, the Easton Rookie of the Year on March 31, 2014, the Sher-Wood Goaltender of the Year on April 1, 2014, the Easton Coach of the Year on April 2, 2014, and the Easton Most Valuable Player on April 3, 2014.

2013–14 SPHL awards
Award	Recipient(s)	Finalists
President's Cup	Pensacola Ice Flyers	Columbus Cottonmouths
William B. Coffey Trophy (Best regular-season record)	Pensacola Ice Flyers	
Easton Defenseman of the Year	Stuart Stefan (Huntsville)	Kirk Byczynski (Louisiana)
Easton Rookie of the Year	Joe Caveney (Pensacola)	Garrett Vermeersch (Peoria)
Sher-Wood Goaltender of the Year	Kyle Rank (Peoria)	Ross MacKinnon (Pensacola)
Easton Coach of the Year	Rod Aldoff (Pensacola)	Jean-Guy Trudel (Peoria)
Easton Most Valuable Player	Shawn McNeil (Louisiana)	Todd Hosmer (Mississippi Riverkings)

=== All-SPHL selections ===
Position	First Team	Second Team	All-Rookie
G	(United States) Kyle Rank (Peoria)	(United States) Ross MacKinnon (Pensacola)	(Canada) Kevin Genoe (Huntsville)
D	(Canada) Andrew Randazzo (Mississippi RiverKings)	(Canada) Kirk Byczynski (Louisiana)	(United States) Mike Grace (Mississippi RiverKings)
D	(Canada) Stuart Stefan (Huntsville)	(United States) Leland Fidler (Huntsville)	(Canada) Jason Gray (Columbus)
F	(Canada) Shawn McNeil (Louisiana)	(United States) Garrett Vermeersch (Peoria)	(United States) Garrett Vermeersch (Peoria)
F	(Canada) Todd Hosmer (Mississippi RiverKings)	(Canada) Matt Gingera (Columbus)	(United States) Joe Caveney (Pensacola)
F	(United States) Joe Caveney (Pensacola)	(United States) Nick Lazorko (Huntsville)	(Canada) Francis Drolet (Knoxville)
