= Steffon =

Steffon is a given name. Notable people with the name include:

- Steffon Armitage (born 1985), English rugby union player
- Steffon Bradford (born 1977), American basketball player
- Steffon Walby (born 1972), American ice hockey player and coach

== See also ==
- Steffon Baratheon, fictional character
- Stefon (disambiguation)
