= 2009–10 SPHL season =

- League: Southern Professional Hockey League
- Sport: Ice hockey
- Duration: October 22, 2009–April 17, 2010

Regular season
- Season champions: Mississippi Surge
- Season MVP: Rob Sich (Fayetteville)
- Top scorer: Kevin Swider (Knoxville)

Playoffs
- Finals champions: Huntsville Havoc
- Finals runners-up: Mississippi Surge

SPHL seasons
- ← 2008–09 2010–11 →

The 2009–10 Southern Professional Hockey League season was the sixth season of the Southern Professional Hockey League. The season began October 22, 2009, and ended April 17, 2010, after a 56-game regular season and a six-team playoff. The Huntsville Havoc captured their first SPHL championship.

== Preseason ==
The Richmond Renegades and Twin City Cyclones franchises folded during the off-season. The Louisiana IceGators, Mississippi Surge, and Pensacola Ice Flyers joined the league, after each of those markets had recently lost an ECHL team.

== Teams ==
2009-10 Southern Professional Hockey League
Team	City	Arena
Columbus Cottonmouths	Columbus, Georgia	Columbus Civic Center
Fayetteville FireAntz	Fayetteville, North Carolina	Cumberland County Crown Coliseum
Huntsville Havoc	Huntsville, Alabama	Von Braun Center
Knoxville Ice Bears	Knoxville, Tennessee	Knoxville Civic Coliseum
Louisiana IceGators	Lafayette, Louisiana	Blackham Coliseum
Mississippi Surge	Biloxi, Mississippi	Mississippi Coast Coliseum
Pensacola Ice Flyers	Pensacola, Florida	Pensacola Civic Center

== Map of teams ==
SPHL teams

== Regular season ==
=== Final standings ===
Team	GP	W	L	OTL	GF	GA	Pts
Mississippi Surge^{‡}	56	34	14	8	210	165	76
Huntsville Havoc	56	31	16	9	199	178	71
Fayetteville FireAntz	56	31	22	3	231	213	65
Knoxville Ice Bears	56	30	23	3	228	199	63
Pensacola Ice Flyers	56	25	23	8	176	205	58
Columbus Cottonmouths	56	22	27	7	171	207	51
Louisiana IceGators	56	23	31	2	175	223	48

^{‡} William B. Coffey Trophy winners
Advanced to playoffs

=== Attendance ===
Team	Total	Games	Average
Fayetteville	102,243	28	3,651
Huntsville	98,365	28	3,513
Pensacola	96,804	28	3,457
Knoxville	91,304	28	3,260
Columbus	78,331	28	2,797
Mississippi	74,223	28	2,650
Louisiana	54,779	28	1,956

== President's Cup playoffs ==
First round
1	Mississippi Surge	5	4	4	6	x
6	Columbus Cottonmouths	2	5*	2	2	x
3	Fayetteville FireAntz	7	5	3
4	Knoxville Ice Bears	1	6**	4*
5	Pensacola Ice Flyers	3	1	4
2	Huntsville Havoc	1	5	5*

Second round
4	Knoxville Ice Bears	1	1	x
2	Huntsville Havoc	5	3	x

Final
1	Mississippi Surge	2	2	2
2	Huntsville Havoc	3	3	3

* indicates overtime game.

=== Finals ===
All times are local (CDT)

April 14, 2010; 7:30 pm	Huntsville	3–2	Mississippi	Mississippi Coast Coliseum, Biloxi, MS; Attendance: 1,988

Game reference

Dan McWhinney
Goalies
Bill Zaniboni
Referees:
Brent Coulombe
Curtis Marouelli

	0 – 1	00:10 – Jeff Grant (Greene)
Jeff Winchester (MacDonald) – pp – 24:59	1 – 1
	1 – 2	31:02 – Matt Larke (Greene, Wolgemuth)
Chris Myers (McCreary, Radovich) – 31:21	2 – 2
Travis Kauffeldt (McCreary, Schembri) – pp – 36:00	3 – 2

14 min
Penalties
10 min
22
Shots
26

April 15, 2010; 7:30 pm	Huntsville	3–2	Mississippi	Mississippi Coast Coliseum, Biloxi, MS; Attendance: 2,025

Game reference

Dan McWhinney
Goalies
Bill Zaniboni
Referees:
Curtis Marouelli
Geoffrey Miller

	0 – 1	13:29 – Matt Zultek (Greene, Larke)
	0 – 2	19:46 – pp – Matthew Larke (Greene)
Brett Liscomb (Hartinger) – pp – 29:24	1 – 2
Mike MacDonald – 49:04	2 – 2
Justin Rohr (Liscomb, Petiot) – 50:00	3 – 2

28 min
Penalties
40 min
26
Shots
26

April 17, 2010; 7:30 pm	Mississippi	2–3	Huntsville	Von Braun Center, Huntsville, AL; Attendance: 4,541

Game reference

Bill Zaniboni
Goalies
Dan McWhinney
Referees:
Geoffrey Miller
Brent Coulombe

	0 – 1	07:56 – pp – Vladimir Hartinger (McCreary, Carter)
	0 – 2	34:19 – Andrew Schembri (Rohr, Kauffeldt)
	0 – 3	51:37 – Mike MacDonald
Nick Klaren (Cacaro, Grant) – 55:43	1 – 3
Tim Velemirovich (Richard) – 56:18	2 – 3

18 min
Penalties
10 min
23
Shots
42

== Awards ==
The SPHL All-Rookie team was announced March 25, 2010, followed by the All-SPHL teams on March 26, Rookie of the Year on March 29, Coach of the Year on March 30, Defenseman of the Year on March 31, Goaltender of the Year on April 1, and MVP on April 2.

President's Cup:	Huntsville Havoc
Coffey Trophy:	Mississippi Surge
League MVP:	Rob Sich (Fayetteville)
Rookie of the Year:	Jesse Biduke (Fayetteville)
Defenseman of the Year:	Steve Weidlich (Mississippi)
Goaltender of the Year:	Bill Zaniboni (Mississippi)
Coach of the Year:	Steffon Walby (Mississippi)

=== All-SPHL selections ===
1st Team All-SPHL

(Canada) F Chris Leveille (Fayetteville)
(Canada) F Rob Sich (Fayetteville)
(United States) F Kevin Swider (Knoxville)
(Canada) D Mark Van Vliet (Knoxville)
(Canada) D Steve Weidlich (Mississippi)
(United States) G Bill Zaniboni (Mississippi)

2nd Team All-SPHL

(Canada) F Lorne Misita (Pensacola)
(Canada) F Michael Richard (Mississippi)
(Canada) F Matt Zultek (Mississippi)
(Canada) D Kevin Harris (Knoxville)
(Canada) D Jeff White (Huntsville)
(Canada) G Ian Vigier (Columbus)

All-Rookie Team

(Canada) F Jesse Biduke (Fayetteville)
(Canada) F Jesse Cole (Columbus)
(Canada) F Levi Lind (Columbus)
(Canada) D Mark Hinz (Pensacola)
(Canada) D Dean Petiot (Huntsville)
(Canada) G Mark Sibbald (Huntsville)
