= 2019–20 SPHL season =

- League: Southern Professional Hockey League
- Sport: Ice hockey
- Duration: October 18, 2019 – March 2020
- Number of games: 56 (scheduled); 44–48 (played)
- Number of teams: 10

Regular season
- Season MVP: Austin Plevy (Evansville)
- Top scorer: Austin Plevy (Evansville)

SPHL seasons
- ← 2018–19 2020–21 →

The 2019–20 SPHL season was the 16th season of the Southern Professional Hockey League (SPHL). Like most other events at the time, the season was cancelled before its conclusion in March 2020 due to the COVID-19 pandemic.

== League business ==
=== Team changes ===
For the first time since the 2012–13 SPHL season, there were no changes to the league membership.

== Teams ==
2019-20 Southern Professional Hockey League
| Team | City | Arena |
| Birmingham Bulls | Pelham, Alabama | Pelham Civic Center |
| Evansville Thunderbolts | Evansville, Indiana | Ford Center |
| Fayetteville Marksmen | Fayetteville, North Carolina | Crown Complex |
| Huntsville Havoc | Huntsville, Alabama | Von Braun Center |
| Knoxville Ice Bears | Knoxville, Tennessee | Knoxville Civic Coliseum |
| Macon Mayhem | Macon, Georgia | Macon Coliseum |
| Pensacola Ice Flyers | Pensacola, Florida | Pensacola Bay Center |
| Peoria Rivermen | Peoria, Illinois | Carver Arena |
| Quad City Storm | Moline, Illinois | TaxSlayer Center |
| Roanoke Rail Yard Dawgs | Roanoke, Virginia | Berglund Center |

== Map of teams ==
SPHL teams

== Regular season ==
=== Standings ===
Final standings:

| Team | GP | W | L | OTL | GF | GA | Pts |
|---|---|---|---|---|---|---|---|
| Peoria Rivermen | 46 | 33 | 8 | 5 | 150 | 105 | 71 |
| Fayetteville Marksmen | 46 | 31 | 6 | 9 | 163 | 120 | 71 |
| Huntsville Havoc | 46 | 27 | 14 | 5 | 144 | 124 | 59 |
| Pensacola Ice Flyers | 46 | 23 | 11 | 12 | 127 | 113 | 58 |
| Evansville Thunderbolts | 46 | 25 | 14 | 7 | 153 | 151 | 57 |
| Knoxville Ice Bears | 48 | 26 | 17 | 5 | 165 | 154 | 57 |
| Roanoke Rail Yard Dawgs | 47 | 16 | 22 | 9 | 117 | 151 | 41 |
| Quad City Storm | 44 | 16 | 20 | 8 | 123 | 144 | 40 |
| Birmingham Bulls | 46 | 17 | 23 | 6 | 122 | 161 | 40 |
| Macon Mayhem | 47 | 17 | 24 | 6 | 115 | 156 | 40 |

^{‡} William B. Coffey Trophy winners
Qualified to advance to playoffs

=== Attendance ===
| Team | Total | Games | Average |
|---|---|---|---|
| Huntsville | 110,869 | 23 | 4,820 |
| Knoxville | 85,740 | 23 | 3,727 |
| Pensacola | 87,527 | 24 | 3,646 |
| Roanoke | 73,962 | 21 | 3,522 |
| Peoria | 87,854 | 25 | 3,514 |
| Quad City | 65,529 | 22 | 2,978 |
| Fayetteville | 59,260 | 22 | 2,693 |
| Birmingham | 54,496 | 23 | 2,369 |
| Evansville | 50,848 | 22 | 2,311 |
| Macon | 48,555 | 26 | 1,867 |
| League | 724,640 | 231 | 3,136 |

== President's Cup playoffs ==
For 2020, the top eight teams at the end of the regular season would have qualified for the playoffs. The league returned to the traditional highest seed versus lowest seed format for all rounds, replacing the "challenge round" used in the previous two seasons where the top three seeds choose their opponent from the bottom four qualifiers. As a result of the league shutdown, there was no playoffs in 2020.

== Awards ==
| Award | Recipient(s) |
|---|---|
| President's Cup | Not awarded |
| William B. Coffey Trophy (Best regular-season record) | Not awarded |
| Defenseman of the Year | Nick Neville (Peoria) |
| Rookie of the Year | Austin Plevy (Evansville) |
| Goaltender of the Year | Eric Levine (Peoria) |
| Coach of the Year | Jesse Kallechy (Fayetteville) |
| Most Valuable Player | Austin Plevy (Evansville) |
| Kevin Swider Leading Scorer Award | Austin Plevy (Evansville) |

=== All-SPHL selections ===
| Position | First Team | Second Team | All-Rookie |
|---|---|---|---|
| G | Eric Levine (Peoria) | Max Milosek (Huntsville) | Joseph Murdaca (Knoxville) |
| D | Matt Fuller (Birmingham); Nick Neville (Peoria) | Travis Armstrong (Roanoke); Saverio Posa (Huntsville) tie Gehrett Sargis (Knoxville) tie | Braden Hellems (Evansville); Meirs Moore (Pensacola) |
| F | Brian Bowen (Fayetteville); Alec Hagaman (Peoria); Austin Plevy (Evansville) | Max Cook (Fayetteville); Scott Cuthrell (Knoxville); Garrett Milan (Pensacola) | Shane Bednard (Fayetteville); Tommaso Bucci (Pensacola); Austin Plevy (Evansville) |
