= 2011–12 SPHL season =

- League: Southern Professional Hockey League
- Sport: Ice hockey
- Duration: October 20, 2011–April 14, 2012

Regular season
- Season champions: Augusta RiverHawks
- Season MVP: Kevin Swider (Knoxville)
- Top scorer: Kevin Swider (Knoxville)

Playoffs
- Finals champions: Columbus Cottonmouths
- Finals runners-up: Pensacola Ice Flyers
- Playoffs MVP: Ian Vigier (Columbus)

SPHL seasons
- ← 2010–11 2012–13 →

The 2011–12 Southern Professional Hockey League season was the eighth season of the Southern Professional Hockey League. The season began October 20, 2011, and ended April 14, 2012, after a 56-game regular season and an eight-team playoff. The Columbus Cottonmouths captured their second SPHL championship.

== Preseason ==
The Mississippi RiverKings joined the SPHL after 19 seasons in the Central Hockey League. With 9 teams now in the SPHL, the league adopted an 8-team playoff format, with all rounds using best-of-three game series.

== Teams ==
2011-12 Southern Professional Hockey League
Team	City	Arena
Augusta RiverHawks	Augusta, Georgia	James Brown Arena
Columbus Cottonmouths	Columbus, Georgia	Columbus Civic Center
Fayetteville FireAntz	Fayetteville, North Carolina	Cumberland County Crown Coliseum
Huntsville Havoc	Huntsville, Alabama	Von Braun Center
Knoxville Ice Bears	Knoxville, Tennessee	Knoxville Civic Coliseum
Louisiana IceGators	Lafayette, Louisiana	Cajundome
Mississippi RiverKings	Southaven, Mississippi	Landers Center
Mississippi Surge	Biloxi, Mississippi	Mississippi Coast Coliseum
Pensacola Ice Flyers	Pensacola, Florida	Pensacola Civic Center

== Map of teams ==
SPHL teams

== Regular season ==
=== Final standings ===
Team	GP	W	L	OTL	GF	GA	Pts
Augusta RiverHawks^{‡}	56	36	13	7	206	159	79
Columbus Cottonmouths	56	35	16	5	185	155	75
Knoxville Ice Bears	56	32	16	8	208	170	72
Pensacola Ice Flyers	56	30	22	4	187	176	64
Mississippi Surge	56	29	24	3	166	162	61
Mississippi RiverKings	56	25	28	3	167	177	53
Louisiana IceGators	56	24	27	5	177	202	53
Huntsville Havoc	56	22	28	6	163	198	50
Fayetteville FireAntz	56	19	32	5	180	240	43

^{‡} William B. Coffey Trophy winners
Advanced to playoffs

=== Attendance ===
Team	Total	Games	Average
Knoxville	100,425	28	3,586
Huntsville	94,354	28	3,369
Fayetteville	91,521	28	3,268
Pensacola	86,752	28	3,098
Mississippi RiverKings	82,068	28	2,931
Columbus	76,484	28	2,731
Mississippi Surge	63,280	28	2,260
Louisiana	56,514	28	2,018
Augusta	53,266	28	1,902
League	704,664	252	2,796

== President's Cup playoffs ==
First Round
1	Augusta RiverHawks	4*	3	2
8	Huntsville Havoc	3	4*	6
4	Pensacola Ice Flyers	4	2	X
5	Mississippi Surge	1	0	X
(Pairings are reseeded after the first round)
6	Mississippi RiverKings	6	2	3
3	Knoxville Ice Bears	3	4	6
7	Louisiana IceGators	2	2	X
2	Columbus Cottonmouths	4	3*	X

Semifinals
2	Columbus Cottonmouths	5	6	X
8	Huntsville Havoc	0	1	X
4	Pensacola Ice Flyers	4	1	X
3	Knoxville Ice Bears	1	0	X

Final
2	Columbus Cottonmouths	3	3	X
4	Pensacola Ice Flyers	2	1	X

* indicates overtime game.

=== Finals ===
All times are local (EDT/CDT)

April 12, 2012; 7:30 PM	Pensacola	2–3 (0–1, 1–0, 1–2)	Columbus	Columbus Civic Center, Columbus, GA; Attendance: 2,245

Game reference

Steve Christie
Goalies
Ian Vigier
Referees:
Tyler Puddifant, Andrew Wilk
Andrew Gray, Joshua Greco

	0 – 1	3:18 – Orrin Hergott (Beller, Pallardy)
Matthew Robertson (Buccella) – 1:20	1 – 1
	1 – 2	1:21 – Orrin Hergott (Pallardy, Cianfrini)
Dan Buccella (Harris) – 3:13	2 – 2
	2 – 3	4:30 – Sam Bowles (Krelove)

4 min
Penalties
8 min
33
Shots
27

April 14, 2012; 7:05 PM	Columbus	3–1 (1–1, 1–0, 1–0)	Pensacola	Pensacola Civic Center, Pensacola, FL; Attendance: 5,630

Game reference

Ian Vigier
Goalies
Steve Christie
Referees:
Jason Schulz, Andrew Wilk
Jared Gregor, Andrew Gray

Jordan Braid (Maldonado, Sullivan) – 9:38	1 – 0
	1 – 1	14:50 – Ryan Salvis
Greg Beller (Pallardy, Maldonado) – 14:56	2 – 1
John Sullivan – en – 19:32	3 – 1

8 min
Penalties
10 min
31
Shots
32

== Awards ==
The SPHL All-Rookie team was announced March 26, 2012, followed by the All-SPHL teams on March 27, Defenseman of the Year on March 28, Rookie of the Year on March 29, Goaltender of the Year on April 2, Coach of the Year on April 3, and Most Valuable Player on April 4.

President's Cup:	Columbus Cottonmouths
Coffey Trophy:	Augusta RiverHawks
League MVP:	Kevin Swider (Knoxville)
Rookies of the Year:	Kiefer Smiley (Mississippi Surge) and Jordan Chong (Pensacola)
Defenseman of the Year:	Mark Van Vliet (Knoxville)
Goaltender of the Year:	Ian Vigier (Columbus)
Coach of the Year:	Jeff Bes (Mississippi Surge)
Playoff MVP:	Ian Vigier (Columbus)

=== All-SPHL selections ===
1st Team All-SPHL

(United States) F Kevin Swider (Knoxville)
(Canada) F Emery Olauson (Knoxville)
(United States) F Jim Gehring (Augusta)
(Canada) D Mark Van Vliet (Knoxville)
(Canada) D Ed Snetsinger (Augusta)
(Canada) G Ian Vigier (Columbus)

2nd Team All-SPHL

(United States) F Matt Auffrey (Augusta)
(Canada) F Chris Wilson (Pensacola)
(United States) F Jason Hill (Louisiana)
(United States) D Bret Tyler (Columbus)
(United States) D Ricky Helmbrecht (Knoxville)
(Canada) G Kiefer Smiley (Mississippi Surge)

All-Rookie Team

(Canada) F Jordan Chong (Pensacola)
(Canada) F Brayden Metz (Louisiana)
(Canada) F Greg Beller (Columbus)
(Canada) D Andrew Krelove (Columbus)
(Canada) D James Isaacs (Mississippi Surge)
(Canada) G Kiefer Smiley (Mississippi Surge)
