= Columbus Cottonmouths =

- City: Columbus, Georgia
- League: CHL (1996–2001); ECHL (2001–2004); SPHL (2004–2017)
- Founded: 1996 (In the CHL)
- Home arena: Columbus Civic Center
- Colors: Blue, gold, black, white
- Owner: Wanda Amos
- General manager: Jerome Bechard
- Head coach: Jerome Bechard
- Media: SPHL Live

Franchise history
- First franchise (CHL)
- 1996–2001: Columbus Cottonmouths
- Second franchise (ECHL)
- 1989–2000: Hampton Roads Admirals
- 2001–2004: Columbus Cottonmouths
- Never played: Gulf Coast Swords
- Third franchise (SPHL)
- 2004–2017: Columbus Cottonmouths

Championships
- Regular season titles: 2 (1997–98, 2006–07)
- Division titles: 3 (1997–98, 1999–00, 2000–01)
- Playoff championships: 3 (1997–98, 2004–05, 2011–12)

The Columbus Cottonmouths were three separate professional ice hockey teams based in Columbus, Georgia. The team is nicknamed the Snakes and played their home games at the Columbus Civic Center. In 2017, the third franchise suspended operations after failing to find a new owner.

== History ==
=== Central Hockey League (CHL): 1996–2001 ===
In 1996, the Columbus Cottonmouths started play in the Central Hockey League, joining the Macon Whoopee and Nashville Nighthawks as expansion entries that were originally slated to be in the Southern Hockey League before its demise in the summer of 1996. Along with the Memphis RiverKings, an established CHL franchise, and the Huntsville Channel Cats, the SHL champion in 1996 and the lone surviving franchise from that league, Columbus and the other two expansion SHL teams formed the new Eastern Division of the CHL in the 1996–97 season. In 1998, the team won the CHL championship, defeating the Wichita Thunder in a four-game sweep. The Cottonmouths were in the CHL playoffs each of their five seasons in the league, making it to the league finals in 2000 and 2001 before losing to the Indianapolis Ice and the Oklahoma City Blazers, respectively. In the summer of 2001, the CHL merged with the Western Professional Hockey League and geographic rivals in Huntsville and Macon were lost, leading the Cottonmouths to seek and obtain entry into the East Coast Hockey League.

DVA Sports, composed of owners Salvador Diaz-Verson and Shelby Amos, purchased the defunct Hampton Roads Admirals ECHL franchise, relocating it to Columbus under the Cottonmouths name.

=== East Coast Hockey League (ECHL): 2001–2004 ===
From 2001 to 2004, the Columbus Cottonmouths organization played in the ECHL, bringing with them their longtime captain Jerome "Boom-Boom" Bechard and head coach Bruce Garber. In the three seasons that Columbus spent in the ECHL, they failed to make the playoffs. Midway through their second season in the ECHL, Garber, the only coach in team history, resigned. General manager Phil Roberto took over for the remainder of the season. Their best season in the ECHL was their last. Prior to the 2003–04 season the team announced the signing of their new coach, former NHL enforcer Brian Curran. They finished with a 37–27–8 record, tied with the Greensboro Generals for the best record by a non-playoff team that season.

In April 2004, Cottonmouth management announced their intention to move their ECHL franchise to the Bradenton-Sarasota area in Florida. The team, which was later named the Gulf Coast Swords, would never come to fruition as financial setbacks delayed the construction of their arena. Finally, after foreclosure on the arena property and numerous delays, the ECHL revoked the Swords franchise in the league in the summer of 2006.

=== Southern Professional Hockey League (SPHL): 2004–2017 ===
In 2004, the Columbus Cottonmouths organization joined the Southern Professional Hockey League as one of its inaugural members. Led by first year coach, and Columbus hockey legend Jerome Bechard, the team won the first SPHL championship in April 2005 by first winning a one-game playoff against the Fayetteville FireAntz by a 4–2 score. They next swept the regular season champion Knoxville Ice Bears to advance to the league finals, which they won against the Macon Trax with two straight victories, ending with a 3–2 overtime win. The Snakes' victory capped an undefeated postseason in which they won five games.

In 2007, the Columbus team won the SPHL Commissioner's Cup as the team with the best season record, but was ousted in the first round of playoffs by the Jacksonville Barracudas, who won the series three games to one. In 2008, the Snakes' 22–24–6 regular-season record was a Columbus hockey team's first losing record since 2002–03 and the first one by a non-ECHL team.

On April 14, 2012, the Cottonmouths won their second President's Cup championship with a two-game sweep of the Pensacola Ice Flyers. The Snakes won game one 3–2 at home and then completed the championship series with a 3–1 road victory over the Ice Flyers. The Cottonmouths went undefeated in the playoffs, 6–0.

On January 19, 2017, the bus carrying the Cottonmouths was involved in a rollover on I-74 on the way to play the Peoria Rivermen. 24 players and staff were injured in the accident. In March 2017, it was announced that owners Wanda and Shelby Amos were selling the team and that general manager and head coach Bechard was in charge of looking for a buyer. The Amoses cited mounting financial losses as their reason for trying to sell the team and that they would cease operations if a new buyer was not found. On May 3, 2017, the team official suspended operations for the 2017–18 season. However, SPHL commissioner Jim Combs confirmed that negotiations with a potential ownership were still ongoing but would only be ready for the 2018–19 season if the ownership transfer was successful. In June, the new potential ownership was confirmed as Residential World Media, headed by Fidel Jenkins, and that the purchase was still in negotiations with the SPHL. However, it was also stated that the "Cottonmouths" branding would not be included in the purchase and the team would instead be called the Columbus Burn. However, in August, the league terminated the application of the Burn to join the league.

In 2019, professional hockey returned to Columbus in the Federal Hockey League with the Columbus River Dragons.

== Season-by-season records ==
=== Central Hockey League ===
Season	GP	W	L	T	Pts	Finish	Playoffs
1996–97	66	32	28	6	70	4th, East	Lost in Quarter Finals
1997–98	70	51	13	6	108	1st, East	Won Levins Cup
1998–99	70	42	21	7	91	2nd, East	Lost in Division Finals
1999–00	70	39	20	11	89	2nd, East	Lost Miron Cup Finals
2000–01	70	41	21	8	90	2nd, East	Lost Miron Cup Finals

=== East Coast Hockey League ===
Season	GP	W	L	RT	PTS	Finish	Playoffs
2001–02	72	24	37	11	59	8th, Southeast	did not qualify
2002–03	72	25	39	8	58	7th, Southeast	did not qualify
2003–04	72	37	27	8	82	5th, Central	did not qualify

=== Southern Professional Hockey League ===
Season	GP	W	L	OTL	PTS	Finish	Playoffs
2004–05	56	30	26	—	60	5th	Won President's Cup
2005–06	56	34	16	6	74	2nd	Lost Quarterfinals
2006–07	56	36	18	2	74	1st	Lost Quarterfinals
2007–08	52	22	24	6	50	6th	Lost Quarterfinals
2008–09	60	31	22	7	69	2nd	Lost Semifinals
2009–10	56	22	27	7	48	6th	Lost First Round
2010–11	56	29	27	—	58	4th	Lost Semifinals
2011–12	56	35	16	5	75	2nd	Won President's Cup
2012–13	56	28	24	4	60	5th	Lost Quarterfinals
2013–14	56	27	26	3	57	6th	Lost Finals
2014–15	56	33	19	4	70	2nd	Lost Semifinals
2015–16	56	19	29	8	46	9th	did not qualify
2016–17	56	22	30	4	48	8th	Lost Quarterfinals

== Staff ==
- Head coach – Jerome Bechard
- Athletic Trainer – Adam Norman
- Equipment manager – Mike Nash

== Championships ==
Year	League	Trophy
1997–98	CHL	William "Bill" Levins Memorial Cup
1997–98	CHL	Adams Cup (regular-season champion)
1997–98	CHL	Eastern Division Champions
1999–2000	CHL	Eastern Division Champions
2000–01	CHL	Eastern Division Champions
2004–05	SPHL	President's Cup
2006–07	SPHL	Commissioner's Cup (regular-season champion)
2011–12	SPHL	President's Cup

== Notable NHL alumni ==
List of Columbus Cottonmouths alumni who played more than 25 games in Columbus and 25 or more games in the National Hockey League.

- Mike Morrison
- Rumun Ndur
