= Jeff Bes =

Canadian ice hockey player (born 1973)

- Born: July 31, 1973 (age 52) Tillsonburg, Ontario, Canada
- Height: 6 ft 0 in (183 cm)
- Weight: 190 lb (86 kg; 13 st 8 lb)
- Played for: Laredo Bucks; Hamilton Dukes; Dallas Stars; Guelph Storm
- NHL draft: 58th overall, 1992; Minnesota North Stars
- Playing career: 1993–2012

Jeff Bes (born July 31, 1973) is a Canadian former professional ice hockey player who played several seasons with the Laredo Bucks. Bes has played for many minor league teams such as the Dayton Bombers, Chicago Wolves, Mississippi Sea Wolves, Orlando Solar Bears, Jacksonville Lizard Kings, SaiPa and several other teams including the Dukes of Hamilton. He also coaches in the SPHL.

== Playing career ==
=== Junior ===
Born in Tillsonburg, Ontario, Bes started playing hockey at age 2. He began his junior career in 1990–91, playing for the Dukes of Hamilton of the Ontario Hockey League. He would score 23 goals and 47 assists for 70 points. His time with Hamilton would be short lived as the following season they became the Guelph Storm. He played the 1991–92 season with the new, Storm, and finish with 40 goals and 62 assists for 102 points. He spent the 1992-93 campaign with the Storm again, scoring 48 goals and 67 assists.

=== Professional ===
Bes was selected by the Minnesota North Stars in the third round of the 1992 NHL entry draft, 58th overall. He would never see regular season action, but was considered a top prospect in the National Hockey League at the time.

Bes spent the next 11 years going back and forth between leagues, such as the International Hockey League, the East Coast Hockey League and the American Hockey League. In 2003, he signed with the Laredo Bucks of the Central Hockey League (CHL). Bes is the Bucks all-time leader in goals, assists, and points a two-time MVP of the CHL. In 2007 Bes took on the responsibilities of being a player and assistant coach with the bucks.

=== International ===
Bes was selected for the 1993 World Junior Ice Hockey Championships in Sweden, where he played on a line with Paul Kariya. He won a gold medal with Team Canada.

== Coaching career ==
In August 2011, Bes was hired as the head coach of the Mississippi Surge of the Southern Professional Hockey League. Following the Surge folding in May 2014, Bes was hired to coach the Fayetteville FireAntz in 2015. After two seasons with Fayetteville, Bes left the team to be closer to his family in Biloxi, Mississippi, but then took the head coaching job with the Pensacola Ice Flyers for the 2017–18 season. In 2019, he was hired as the SPHL's Evansville Thunderbolts head coach.

== Career statistics ==
| | | | Regular season | | | | | Playoffs |
| Season | Team | League | GP | G | A | Pts | PIM | GP | G | A | Pts | PIM |
|---|---|---|---|---|---|---|---|---|---|---|---|---|
| 1990–91 | Dukes of Hamilton | OHL | 66 | 23 | 47 | 70 | 53 | 4 | 1 | 4 | 5 | 4 |
| 1991–92 | Guelph Storm | OHL | 62 | 40 | 62 | 102 | 123 | — | — | — | — | — |
| 1992–93 | Guelph Storm | OHL | 59 | 48 | 67 | 115 | 128 | 5 | 3 | 5 | 8 | 4 |
| 1992–92 | Kalamazoo Wings | IHL | 3 | 1 | 3 | 4 | 6 | — | — | — | — | — |
| 1993–94 | Kalamazoo Wings | IHL | 30 | 2 | 12 | 14 | 30 | — | — | — | — | — |
| 1994–95 | Kalamazoo Wings | IHL | 52 | 8 | 17 | 25 | 47 | — | — | — | — | — |
| 1995–96 | Springfield Falcons | AHL | 57 | 20 | 23 | 43 | 77 | 9 | 3 | 4 | 7 | 13 |
| 1996–97 | SaiPa | Liiga | 40 | 10 | 12 | 22 | 146 | — | — | — | — | — |
| 1997–98 | Chicago Wolves | IHL | 24 | 3 | 5 | 8 | 20 | — | — | — | — | — |
| 1997–98 | Orlando Solar Bears | IHL | 15 | 1 | 2 | 3 | 8 | 2 | 0 | 0 | 0 | 5 |
| 1998–99 | Kassel Huskies | DEL | 6 | 0 | 0 | 0 | 6 | — | — | — | — | — |
| 1999–00 | Jacksonville Lizard Kings | ECHL | 28 | 12 | 24 | 36 | 27 | — | — | — | — | — |
| 1999–00 | Espoo Blues | Liiga | 6 | 0 | 0 | 0 | 12 | — | — | — | — | — |
| 1999–00 | Orlando Solar Bears | IHL | 1 | 0 | 0 | 0 | 0 | — | — | — | — | — |
| 2000–01 | Pensacola Ice Pilots | ECHL | 48 | 24 | 44 | 68 | 69 | — | — | — | — | — |
| 2000–01 | Jackson Bandits | ECHL | 20 | 11 | 21 | 32 | 34 | 5 | 1 | 3 | 4 | 10 |
| 2001–02 | Mississippi Sea Wolves | ECHL | 23 | 9 | 19 | 28 | 62 | — | — | — | — | — |
| 2001–02 | Augusta Lynx | ECHL | 24 | 5 | 21 | 26 | 40 | — | — | — | — | — |
| 2001–02 | Greensboro Generals | ECHL | 20 | 4 | 19 | 23 | 22 | — | — | — | — | — |
| 2002–03 | Jackson Bandits | ECHL | 63 | 23 | 39 | 62 | 115 | 1 | 0 | 0 | 0 | 4 |
| 2003–04 | Laredo Bucks | CHL | 64 | 39 | 78 | 117 | 111 | 16 | 4 | 14 | 18 | 37 |
| 2004–05 | Laredo Bucks | CHL | 60 | 26 | 45 | 71 | 76 | 15 | 8 | 6 | 14 | 26 |
| 2005–06 | Laredo Bucks | CHL | 56 | 27 | 61 | 88 | 72 | 15 | 11 | 20 | 31 | 26 |
| 2006–07 | Laredo Bucks | CHL | 51 | 28 | 40 | 68 | 76 | 21 | 16 | 8 | 24 | 24 |
| 2007–08 | Laredo Bucks | CHL | 64 | 46 | 60 | 106 | 72 | 11 | 3 | 9 | 12 | 14 |
| 2008–09 | Laredo Bucks | CHL | 39 | 14 | 46 | 60 | 52 | — | — | — | — | — |
| 2009–10 | Laredo Bucks | CHL | 64 | 19 | 56 | 75 | 42 | 7 | 0 | 5 | 5 | 6 |
| 2010–11 | Laredo Bucks | CHL | 60 | 20 | 35 | 55 | 44 | — | — | — | — | — |
| AHL totals | | | 57 | 20 | 23 | 43 | 77 | 9 | 3 | 4 | 7 | 13 |
| ECHL totals | | | 226 | 88 | 187 | 275 | 369 | 6 | 1 | 3 | 4 | 14 |

== Awards and honours ==
| Awards | Year |
|---|---|
| SPHL Coach of the Year | 2011–12 |
