= New Augusta Arena =

Indoor arena under construction in Augusta, Georgia, U.S.

- Interactive map of New Augusta Arena
- Location: Augusta, Georgia
- Coordinates: 33°28′12″N 81°57′59″W
- Owner: Augusta–Richmond County Coliseum Authority
- Operator: Oak View Group
- Capacity: 10,500; 10,300 (basketball); 8,720 (hockey)

Construction
- Groundbreaking: June 25, 2024
- Opened: Spring 2027
- Cost: $250 million

Tenant
- Augusta Lynx (ECHL) (2027–)

New Augusta Arena is an indoor arena under construction in Augusta, Georgia on the site of the demolished James Brown Arena. It will be home to the Augusta Lynx of the ECHL. It will have a capacity of 10,500. Opening is planned for 2027. It is owned by the Augusta–Richmond County Coliseum Authority.

== History ==
In August 2017, the Augusta-Richmond County Coliseum Authority voted 4–2 to relocate the arena to the former Regency Mall location off on Gordon Highway in South Augusta. The proposed site called for a new development at the Regency Mall site called Regency Town Center & Park. The development would feature a new arena, new retail shops and restaurants, and new apartments as well. Augusta Mayor Hardie Davis was a key proponent of the move as he pushed for more redevelopment efforts in the Gordon Highway area in an area he called SOGO (South of Gordon Highway). Soon following the Coliseum Authority's vote, local residents launched the "Save The J" campaign which advocated for keeping the new arena at its current location in downtown Augusta.

Augusta commissioners voted down the proposed site in a December 2017 before ultimately deciding to put the question of the new arena location on the Republican and Democratic primary ballots as a non-binding referendum in May 2018. Augustans voted 57% to 43% to keep the arena at its current location in downtown Augusta.

Plans soon began to be developed for the arena to be constructed on the current site before plans were revealed in early 2021 for a new arena. The new arena plans call for a 10,500 seat capacity featuring meeting rooms, 1,100 premium seats, 12 luxury suites, and a new connector between the Bell Auditorium and the arena all with an estimated cost of $250 million for construction.

The new arena was on the November 2021 ballot for a bond referendum vote. Had the bond referendum passed, the estimated time of completion would have been Fall 2024. Despite low voter turnout, the bond referendum was rejected, forcing the Coliseum Authority to look for alternate sources of funding.

In the November 2023 elections, Richmond County residents voted in favor of levying a half-cent special-purpose local-option sales tax to cover the cost of the new arena. The old arena's final public event was the 2024 commencement ceremony for Augusta Technical College, held on May 31, 2024; the reopening of the Bell Auditorium following a $20 million renovation coincided with the arena's closure. The groundbreaking ceremony for the new arena was held on June 25, 2024. After two months of interior demolition, construction crews began exterior demolition of the old arena in early December 2024. By mid-May 2025, the old arena's superstructure has been removed completely, with grading, using grounded concrete from the old arena, taking place on the site before construction of the new arena begins.
