= Augusta Lynx =

- City: Augusta, Georgia
- League: ECHL
- Conference: Eastern
- Division: South
- Founded: 2025
- Home arena: New Augusta Arena
- Colors
- Owners: Tim Tebow; David Hodges
- Website: augustalynx.com

The Augusta Lynx are a future American minor league ice hockey team based in Augusta, Georgia. Founded in 2025, the team plans to make its debut in the ECHL in 2027. Affiliation with teams from the National Hockey League and American Hockey League will be determined at a later date. The club will play in the New Augusta Arena, which is being built on the site of its predecessor, James Brown Arena.

== History ==
The city of Augusta previously had another ECHL franchise known as the Augusta Lynx, who played from the 1998–99 ECHL season until folding 18 games into the 2008–09 ECHL season, becoming the first ECHL franchise to cease operations mid-season. In 2010, Augusta was granted an expansion franchise in the Southern Professional Hockey League, the Augusta RiverHawks, who suspended operations following the 2012–13 SPHL season after the James Brown Arena's ice refrigeration system failed in late February 2013, forcing the team to play their remaining home games at their practice facility. After team ownership and city officials failed to reach an agreement on replacing the ice system, the RiverHawks subsequently moved in-state to Macon as the Macon Mayhem, resuming play in the 2015–16 SPHL season.

On August 20, 2025, the ECHL awarded an expansion team to the city of Augusta, Georgia. The ownership group consists of Tim Tebow and David Hodges, who also own the Tahoe Knight Monsters.

On May 26, 2026, the team announced that they would revive the Augusta Lynx branding for the new team starting in 2027. However, it was also revealed that the new team will use green, yellow, and black for their colors as a nod to the Masters Tournament held in Augusta every year, as opposed to the light blue, black, and silver color scheme from the original team.
