= Matt Zultek =

Canadian ice hockey player (born 1979)

- Born: March 12, 1979 (age 47) Mississauga, Ontario, Canada
- Height: 6 ft 4 in (193 cm)
- Weight: 210 lb (95 kg; 15 st 0 lb)
- Position: Left wing
- Shot: Left
- Played for: Philadelphia Phantoms; Springfield Falcons; Manitoba Moose
- NHL draft: 15th overall, 1997; Los Angeles Kings; 56th overall, 1999; Boston Bruins
- Playing career: 2001–2011

Matt Zultek (born March 12, 1979) is a Canadian former professional ice hockey player who was drafted in the first round, 15th overall, by the Los Angeles Kings in the 1997 NHL entry draft. The Kings had acquired this selection from the St. Louis Blues as part of the 1996 Wayne Gretzky trade. The Kings were unable to sign him to a contract, and he was redrafted in 1999 by the Boston Bruins.

Zultek never played in the National Hockey League, and most recently played for the Toledo Storm (ECHL) in 2006-07 and the Rapid City Rush (CHL) 2008-09. From 2009 to 2011 he played for the Mississippi Surge (SPHL).

Zultek scored the 1999 Memorial Cup winning goal for the Ottawa 67's against the Calgary Hitmen.

== Career statistics ==
| | | | Regular season | | | | | Playoffs |
| Season | Team | League | GP | G | A | Pts | PIM | GP | G | A | Pts | PIM |
|---|---|---|---|---|---|---|---|---|---|---|---|---|
| 1995–96 | Caledon Canadians | MetJHL | 50 | 19 | 14 | 33 | 40 | — | — | — | — | — |
| 1996–97 | Ottawa 67's | OHL | 63 | 27 | 13 | 40 | 76 | 21 | 6 | 7 | 13 | 27 |
| 1997–98 | Ottawa 67's | OHL | 62 | 28 | 28 | 56 | 156 | 14 | 6 | 12 | 18 | 20 |
| 1998–99 | Ottawa 67's | OHL | 56 | 33 | 33 | 66 | 71 | 9 | 6 | 2 | 8 | 4 |
| 1999–2000 | Ottawa 67's | OHL | 28 | 9 | 6 | 15 | 34 | 11 | 3 | 5 | 8 | 12 |
| 2000–01 | St. Thomas University | AUS | 17 | 12 | 7 | 19 | 68 | — | — | — | — | — |
| 2000–01 | Philadelphia Phantoms | AHL | 25 | 1 | 5 | 6 | 14 | 9 | 0 | 1 | 1 | 8 |
| 2001–02 | Trenton Titans | ECHL | 48 | 15 | 13 | 28 | 148 | 7 | 4 | 1 | 5 | 12 |
| 2001–02 | Philadelphia Phantoms | AHL | — | — | — | — | — | 1 | 0 | 0 | 0 | 0 |
| 2002–03 | Philadelphia Phantoms | AHL | 13 | 0 | 0 | 0 | 2 | — | — | — | — | — |
| 2002–03 | Trenton Titans | ECHL | 58 | 25 | 27 | 52 | 205 | 3 | 1 | 0 | 1 | 2 |
| 2003–04 | Springfield Falcons | AHL | 4 | 0 | 0 | 0 | 0 | — | — | — | — | — |
| 2003–04 | Trenton Titans | ECHL | 65 | 35 | 30 | 65 | 217 | — | — | — | — | — |
| 2004–05 | Manitoba Moose | AHL | 1 | 0 | 0 | 0 | 0 | — | — | — | — | — |
| 2004–05 | Trenton Titans | ECHL | 60 | 12 | 17 | 29 | 231 | 13 | 1 | 0 | 1 | 30 |
| 2005–06 | Greenville Grrrowl | ECHL | 22 | 6 | 5 | 11 | 56 | — | — | — | — | — |
| 2005–06 | Toledo Storm | ECHL | 24 | 10 | 8 | 18 | 47 | 13 | 8 | 6 | 14 | 42 |
| 2006–07 | Toledo Storm | ECHL | 72 | 27 | 37 | 64 | 92 | 2 | 0 | 0 | 0 | 14 |
| 2007–08 | EC Dornbirn | AUT.2 | 31 | 36 | 26 | 62 | 120 | 12 | 10 | 10 | 20 | 6 |
| 2008–09 | EC Dornbirn | AUT.2 | 21 | 13 | 19 | 32 | 45 | — | — | — | — | — |
| 2008–09 | Rapid City Rush | CHL | 17 | 6 | 4 | 10 | 11 | — | — | — | — | — |
| 2009–10 | Mississippi Surge | SPHL | 52 | 47 | 21 | 68 | 93 | 7 | 3 | 4 | 7 | 4 |
| 2010–11 | Mississippi Surge | SPHL | 45 | 32 | 15 | 47 | 73 | 8 | 5 | 1 | 6 | 0 |
| AHL totals | | | 43 | 1 | 5 | 6 | 16 | 10 | 0 | 1 | 1 | 8 |
| ECHL totals | | | 349 | 130 | 137 | 267 | 996 | 38 | 14 | 7 | 21 | 100 |

| Preceded by Olli Jokinen | Los Angeles Kings first-round draft pick 1997 | Succeeded by Mathieu Biron |
