= Chris Chambers (disambiguation) =

Chris Chambers (born 1978), National Football League wide receiver.

Chris Chambers may also refer to:

- Chris Chambers (ice hockey) (born 1986), American player for the Mississippi Surge
- Chris Chambers, a fictional character from the novella The Body (adapted into the film Stand by Me)
- Chris Chambers, former deputy director of development for America's Army
