= Mark DeSantis (ice hockey) =

Canadian ice hockey player and coach

- Born: January 12, 1972 (age 54) Brampton, Ontario, Canada
- Height: 6 ft 1 in (185 cm)
- Weight: 218 lb (99 kg; 15 st 8 lb)
- Position: Defence
- Shot: Right
- Played for: IHL; San Diego Gulls; San Antonio Dragons; Grand Rapids Griffins; ECHL; Greensboro Monarchs; Jacksonville Lizard Kings; Louisiana IceGators; Augusta Lynx; Toledo Storm; AHL; Baltimore Bandits; Providence Bruins; WPHL; New Mexico Scorpions; CHL; San Antonio Iguanas; Amarillo Gorillas; Rapid City Rush; EIHL; Basingstoke Bison; UHL; Port Huron Icehawks
- NHL draft: Undrafted
- Playing career: 1993–2009

Mark DeSantis (born January 12, 1972) is a Canadian professional ice hockey coach and former player.

== Career ==
DeSantis was the head coach for the Rapid City Rush of the ECHL from midway into the 2015–16 season until the end of the 2016–17 season. He was the head coach of the Fayetteville FireAntz of the Southern Professional Hockey League for the 2012–13 season and of the Brampton Beast of the Central Hockey League for the 2013–14 season.

== Career statistics ==
			Regular season					Playoffs
Season	Team	League	GP	G	A	Pts	PIM	GP	G	A	Pts	PIM
1989–90	Cornwall Royals	OHL	59	3	17	20	79	6	0	2	2	13
1990–91	Cornwall Royals	OHL	41	7	15	22	78	—	—	—	—	—
1991–92	Cornwall Royals	OHL	66	10	45	55	105	6	1	2	3	7
1992–93	Newmarket Royals	OHL	66	19	70	89	136	7	3	11	14	14
1993–94	San Diego Gulls	IHL	65	5	10	15	95	—	—	—	—	—
1994–95	Greensboro Monarchs	ECHL	57	10	34	44	196	15	0	4	4	41
1994–95	San Diego Gulls	IHL	8	0	0	0	23	—	—	—	—	—
1995–96	Jacksonville Lizard Kings	ECHL	51	12	32	44	243	18	6	15	21	56
1995–96	Baltimore Bandits	AHL	8	0	0	0	21	—	—	—	—	—
1996–97	San Antonio Dragons	IHL	61	7	15	22	184	2	0	1	1	2
1997–98	San Antonio Dragons	IHL	61	5	12	17	108	—	—	—	—	—
1998–99	Louisiana IceGators	ECHL	27	4	10	14	85	—	—	—	—	—
1998–99	Augusta Lynx	ECHL	25	1	5	6	31	2	0	0	0	2
1998–99	Grand Rapids Griffins	IHL	7	0	0	0	9	—	—	—	—	—
1999–00	Augusta Lynx	ECHL	16	1	5	6	31	—	—	—	—	—
1999–00	Toledo Storm	ECHL	44	4	28	32	235	—	—	—	—	—
1999–00	Providence Bruins	AHL	6	1	2	3	17	—	—	—	—	—
2000–01	New Mexico Scorpions	WPHL	67	21	42	63	169	—	—	—	—	—
2001–02	San Antonio Iguanas	CHL	64	13	43	56	156	4	0	1	1	18
2002–03	Amarillo Gorillas	CHL	64	7	41	48	106	4	0	5	5	10
2003–04	Amarillo Gorillas	CHL	64	12	42	54	113	8	1	1	2	12
2004–05	Amarillo Gorillas	CHL	60	8	22	30	104	9	2	2	4	18
2005–06	Amarillo Gorillas	CHL	62	11	34	45	163	8	2	1	3	16
2006–07	Basingstoke Bison	EIHL	54	12	33	45	151	2	1	0	1	0
2007–08	Port Huron Icehawks	IHL	66	6	22	28	64	12	1	2	3	14
2008–09	Rapid City Rush	CHL	64	3	17	20	140	—	—	—	—	—
AHL totals			14	1	2	3	38	—	—	—	—	—
ECHL totals			220	32	122	154	836	35	6	19	25	99

== Awards and honours ==
Awards	Year
WPHL Most outstanding defenceman	2000–01
SPHL Coach of the Year	2012–13
