= Louisiana IceGators =

Louisiana IceGators may refer to:

- Louisiana IceGators (ECHL), an ice hockey team from Lafayette, Louisiana, that played in the East Coast Hockey League/ECHL from 1995 to 2005
- Louisiana IceGators (SPHL), an ice hockey team from Lafayette, Louisiana, that played in the Southern Professional Hockey League from 2009 to 2016
