= Steffon Walby =

American ice hockey player and coach

- Born: November 22, 1972 (age 53) Madison, WI, USA
- Height: 6 ft 1 in (185 cm)
- Weight: 190 lb (86 kg; 13 st 8 lb)
- Position: Right wing
- Shot: Right
- Played for: AHL; St. John's Maple Leafs; Hershey Bears; Rochester Americans; Kentucky Thoroughblades; IHL; Fort Wayne Komets; ECHL; Mississippi Sea Wolves
- NHL draft: Undrafted
- Playing career: 1993–2004

Steffon Walby (born November 22, 1972) is an American retired ice hockey player and coach.

Walby was the first head coach of the Mississippi Surge of the Southern Professional Hockey League (SPHL) and was selected as the 2009–10 SPHL Coach of the Year in his inaugural season. The following year, he coached the Surge to capture the 2010–11 SPHL championship. Prior to the start of the next season, the new owner of the team fired Walby from his post as the team's head coach.

== Awards and honors ==
Awards	Year
ECHL First All-Star Team	2001–02
ECHL First All-Star Team	2002–03
ECHL First All-Star Team	2003–04
SPHL Coach of the Year	2009–10
