= David MacIsaac =

American ice hockey player (born 1972)

Dave MacIsaac
- Born: April 23, 1972 (age 52); Cambridge, Massachusetts, U.S.
- Height: 6 ft 2 in (188 cm)
- Weight: 225 lb (102 kg; 16 st 1 lb)
- Position: Defense
- Shot: Left
- Played for: Milwaukee Admirals; Philadelphia Phantoms; Lowell Lock Monsters; Kentucky Thoroughblades; Hershey Bears; Hartford Wolf Pack; Amur Khabarovsk; Danbury Trashers
- NHL draft: Undrafted
- Playing career: 1995–2008

David MacIsaac (born April 23, 1972) is a former professional ice hockey player and hockey coach from Cambridge, Massachusetts.

MacIsaac established his footing in the ice hockey industry when he won the NCAA championship with the University of Maine in 1992–93. He was also selected for the Hockey East All-Rookie team that season. During his collegiate career, MacIsaac majored in physical education with a concentration in teaching and coaching.

In 1995, MacIsaac began his professional hockey career in the International Hockey League. He played more than 750 professional games before moving on to the NHL's primary feeder league, the American Hockey League.

After a nearly 14 season playing career, MacIsaac would move on to coaching. He led the Danbury Mad Hatters (EPHL) to a 30-18-2 record as the head coach in 2008–09. In 2009, MacIsaac would become the head coach of the Louisiana IceGators (SPHL). For the 2011–12 season, he would assume the same role for Bjorninn HC of the Icelandic Hockey League and Bjorninn HC won the league championship that season. He would be named head coach of the Icelandic National team where he led the team to a bronze medal at the World Championships. It was announced in 2021 that MacIsaac would be returning to Danbury, where he captained Danbury Trashers and would be the Head Coach of the Danbury Hat Tricks, leading them to the league semi finals in his only season there.

MacIsaac speaks 5 different languages: English, French, Russian, Icelandic, and Italian.

Awards and accomplishments:

- 1992–93 – NCAA Champion (UMaine) & Hockey East All-Rookie Team Selection
- 1998 – Calder Cup Champion (Philadelphia Phantoms)
- 2001 – AHL Plus/Minus Player of the Year
- 2012 – Icelandic Hockey League Champions & Named Assistant Coach of Icelandic National Team
- 2013 – Head coach of the Icelandic National Hockey Team.

Team captain:

- 1994–95 University of Maine (NCAA)
- 1998–99 Philadelphia Phantoms (AHL)
- 1999–00 Lowell Lock Monsters (AHL)
- 2000–01 Kentucky Thoroughblades (AHL)
- 2001–02 Hartford Wolf Pack (AHL)
- 2002–03 Amur Khabarovsk (Russian Superleague)
- 2005–06 Danbury Trashers (UHL)
