= 2012–13 SPHL season =

- League: Southern Professional Hockey League
- Sport: Ice hockey
- Duration: October 26, 2012–April 14, 2013

Regular season
- Season champions: Fayetteville FireAntz
- Season MVP: (Canada) Josh McQuade (Fayetteville)
- Top scorer: (Canada) Josh McQuade (Fayetteville)

Playoffs
- Finals champions: Pensacola Ice Flyers
- Finals runners-up: Huntsville Havoc

SPHL seasons
- ← 2011–12 2013–14 →

The 2012–13 Southern Professional Hockey League season was the ninth season of the Southern Professional Hockey League (SPHL). The regular season began October 26, 2012 and ended April 14, 2013, after a 56-game regular season and an 8-team playoff. The Fayetteville FireAntz captured their first SPHL regular season title. The Pensacola Ice Flyers defeated the Huntsville Havoc in the President's Cup final 2 games to 1 to win the team's first President's Cup.

== Teams ==
2012-13 Southern Professional Hockey League
Team	City	Arena
Augusta RiverHawks	Augusta, Georgia	James Brown Arena
Columbus Cottonmouths	Columbus, Georgia	Columbus Civic Center
Fayetteville FireAntz	Fayetteville, North Carolina	Cumberland County Crown Coliseum
Huntsville Havoc	Huntsville, Alabama	Von Braun Center
Knoxville Ice Bears	Knoxville, Tennessee	Knoxville Civic Coliseum
Louisiana IceGators	Lafayette, Louisiana	Cajundome
Mississippi RiverKings	Southaven, Mississippi	Landers Center
Mississippi Surge	Biloxi, Mississippi	Mississippi Coast Coliseum
Pensacola Ice Flyers	Pensacola, Florida	Pensacola Bay Center

== Map of teams ==
SPHL teams

== Regular season ==
=== Final standings ===
Team	GP	W	L	OTL	GF	GA	Pts
Fayetteville FireAntz^{‡}	56	35	18	3	195	154	73
Louisiana IceGators	56	34	17	5	172	167	73
Pensacola Ice Flyers	56	33	18	5	171	149	71
Knoxville Ice Bears	56	33	19	4	180	157	70
Columbus Cottonmouths	56	28	24	4	149	138	60
Mississippi Surge	56	25	23	8	152	156	58
Mississippi RiverKings	56	24	24	8	165	183	56
Huntsville Havoc	56	21	29	6	135	179	48
Augusta RiverHawks	56	19	31	6	150	186	44

^{‡} William B. Coffey Trophy winners
Advanced to playoffs

=== Attendance ===
Team	Total	Games	Average
Huntsville	98,393	28	3,514
Knoxville	96,570	28	3,448
Fayetteville	96,313	28	3,439
Pensacola	92,087	28	3,288
Columbus	79,260	28	2,830
Mississippi RiverKings	70,373	28	2,513
Louisiana	64,080	28	2,288
Mississippi Surge	58,496	28	2,089
Augusta	51,247	28	1,830
League	706,819	252	2,804

== President's Cup playoffs ==
First Round
1	Fayetteville FireAntz	2	4	X
8	Huntsville Havoc	3*	5*	X
4	Knoxville Ice Bears	3	3	X
5	Columbus Cottonmouths	0	0	X
(Pairings are reseeded after the first round)
6	Mississippi Surge	1	3	X
3	Pensacola Ice Flyers	4	5	X
7	Mississippi RiverKings	5	5	4
2	Louisiana IceGators	7	2	5*

Semifinals
2	Louisiana IceGators	3	2***	1
8	Huntsville Havoc	5	1	5
3	Pensacola Ice Flyers	3	1
4	Knoxville Ice Bears	2	0

Final
8	Huntsville Havoc	1	2	0
3	Pensacola Ice Flyers	2*	1	2

* indicates overtime period.

=== Finals ===
All times are local (EDT/CDT)

April 9, 2013; 7:05pm	Huntsville	1 – 2 OT (1–0, 0–1, 0–0, 0–1)	Pensacola	Pensacola Civic Center; Pensacola, Florida; Attendance: 3,632

Game reference

Jesse Kallechy
Goalies
Ross MacKinnon
Referees:
Andrew Howard
Tyler Puddifant

Stuart Stefan (Fidler, Gurtler) - 17:08	1–0
	1–1	19:10 - Mitchell Good (Soehner, Dupuis)
	1–2	17:01 - Dan Buccella (Cooper, Knowlton)

2 min
Penalties
2 min
44
Shots
72

April 12, 2013; 7:30pm	Pensacola	1 – 2 (0–0, 1–0, 0–2)	Huntsville	Von Braun Center; Huntsville, Alabama; Attendance: 4,856

Game reference

Ross MacKinnon
Goalies
Jesse Kallechy
Referees:
Peter MacDougall
Curtis Marouelli

Patrick Knowlton (Dunbar) - pp - 16:10	1–0
	1–1	10:30 - Aaron McGill (Fidler, DeBruyn)
	1–2	19:51 - Justin Fox (Stefan, McGill)

43 min
Penalties
39 min
37
Shots
25

April 14, 2013; 6:05pm	Huntsville	0 – 2 (0–1, 0–1, 0–0)	Pensacola	Pensacola Civic Center; Pensacola, Florida; Attendance: 4,693

Game reference
Jesse Kallechy	Goalies	Ross MacKinnon	Referees: Tyler Puddifant; Curtis Marouelli
0–1 / 2:07 - Patrick Knowlton (Dunbar, Vossberg); 0–2 / 12:32 - Brad Cooper (Dunbar, Chong)			Referees: Tyler Puddifant; Curtis Marouelli
2 min	Penalties	4 min	Referees: Tyler Puddifant; Curtis Marouelli
28	Shots	46	Referees: Tyler Puddifant; Curtis Marouelli

== Awards ==
The SPHL All-Rookie team was announced on March 27, 2013, the All-SPHL teams on March 28, Defenseman of the Year on March 29, Rookie of the Year on April 1, Goaltender of the Year on April 2, Coach of the Year on April 3, and Most Valuable Player on April 4.

2012–13 SPHL awards
Award	Recipient(s)	Finalists
President's Cup	Pensacola Ice Flyers	Huntsville Havoc
William B. Coffey Trophy (Best regular-season record)	Fayetteville FireAntz	
Easton Defenseman of the Year	Andrew Smale (Fayetteville)	Kirk Byczynski (Louisiana)
Easton Rookie of the Year	Matt Gingera (Columbus)	Kirk Byczynski (Louisiana); Ross MacKinnon (Pensacola)
Sher-Wood Goaltender of the Year	Riley Gill (Louisiana)	Andrew Loewen (Columbus)
Easton Coach of the Year	Mark DeSantis (Fayetteville)	Kevin Kaminski (Louisiana)
Easton Most Valuable Player	Josh McQuade (Fayetteville)	Riley Gill (Louisiana)

=== All-SPHL selections ===
Position	First Team	Second Team	All-Rookie
G	(United States) Riley Gill (Louisiana)	(Canada) Andrew Loewen (Columbus)	(United States) Ross MacKinnon (Pensacola)
D	(Canada) Andrew Smale (Fayetteville)	(Canada) Kirk Byczynski (Louisiana)	(Canada) Kirk Byczynski (Louisiana)
D	(Canada) Mark Van Vliet (Knoxville)	(United States) Bret Tyler (Columbus)	(United States) Mike Kavanagh (Fayetteville)
F	(Canada) Josh McQuade (Fayetteville)	(Canada) Matt Gingera (Columbus)	(United States) Derek Elliott (Fayetteville)
F	(Canada) Matt Robertson (Louisiana)	(Canada) Eric Satim (Knoxville)	(Canada) Matt Gingera (Columbus)
F	(Canada) Ryan Salvis (Pensacola)	(Canada) Matt Whitehead (Mississippi RiverKings)	(Canada) Todd Hosmer (Mississippi RiverKings))
