= Mississippi RiverKings =

- City: Southaven, Mississippi
- League: Central Hockey League (1992–2011); Southern Professional Hockey League (2011–2018)
- Founded: 1992 (In the CHL)
- Folded: 2018
- Home arena: Landers Center
- Colors: Black, white, gold
- Owner: Maddox Foundation

Franchise history
- 1992–2007: Memphis RiverKings
- 2007–2018: Mississippi RiverKings

Championships
- Regular season titles: None
- Division titles: 3 (2000–01, 2001–02, 2008–09)
- Conference titles: None
- Ray Miron President's Cup: 2 (2001–02, 2002–03)

The Mississippi RiverKings were a professional minor league ice hockey team. The RiverKings were a member of the Southern Professional Hockey League from 2011 to 2018 after playing their first nineteen seasons (1992–2011) in the Central Hockey League. On July 2, 2007, after 15 seasons as the Memphis RiverKings, the team's name was changed to Mississippi RiverKings.

For their first eight seasons, the team played their home games in the Mid-South Coliseum in Memphis, Tennessee. From 2000 to 2018, their home was the Landers Center in Southaven, Mississippi, a suburb of Memphis.

On June 13, 2011, it was announced the RiverKings had left the CHL to join the SPHL.

On May 24, 2018, the RiverKings' ownership announced it had suspended operations for the 2018–19 season, but the team never took the ice again.

== Championships ==
Year	League	Trophy
2002–03	CHL	Ray Miron President's Cup
2001–02	CHL	Ray Miron President's Cup

== Season-by-season record ==
Central Hockey League champions	Conference champions	Division Leader

Note: GP = Games played, W = Wins, L = Losses, T/OTL = Ties/Overtime losses/Shootout losses, Pts = Points, GF = Goals for, GA = Goals against, PIM = Penalties in minutes

Season	GP	W	L	T/OTL	Pts	GF	GA	PIM	Finish	Playoffs
1992–93	60	26	27	7	59	253	272	1670	4th in CHL	Lost in round 1 to Oklahoma City Blazers 2–4
1993–94	64	25	34	5	55	243	294	1312	5th in CHL	Did not qualify
1994–95	66	24	35	7	55	259	327	1534	6th in CHL	Did not qualify
1995–96	64	34	24	6	74	308	271	1918	3rd in CHL	Lost in round 1 to San Antonio Iguanas 2–4
1996–97	66	35	27	4	74	278	260	1479	3rd in Eastern	Won in round 1 against Macon Whoopee 3–2; Won in round 2 against Huntsville Channel Cats 4–2; Lost in finals against Fort Worth Fire 3–4
1997–98	70	25	40	5	55	230	287	1948	4th in Western	Lost in round 1 to Oklahoma City Blazers 1–3
1998–99	70	36	27	7	79	313	307	1747	3rd in Eastern	Lost in round 1 to Columbus Cottonmouths 1–3
1999–00	70	9	57	4	22	175	341	1796	5th in Eastern	Did not qualify
2000–01	70	43	21	6	92	296	236	2345	1st in Eastern	Won in round 1 against Indianapolis Ice 3–0; Lost in round 2 to Columbus Cottonmouths 1–3
2001–02	64	46	14	4	92	267	186	1410	1st in Northeast	Won in round 1 against Fort Worth Brahmas 3–1; Won in round 2 against Bossier-Shreveport Mudbugs 4–3; Won in finals against Austin Ice Bats 4–1
2002–03	64	39	21	4	82	235	190	1784	2nd in Northeast	Won in round 1 against Oklahoma City Blazers 3–2; Won in round 2 against Indianapolis Ice 4–0; Won in finals against Austin Ice Bats 4–1
2003–04	64	35	25	4	74	198	184	1400	3rd in Northeast	Did not qualify
2004–05	60	30	28	2	62	206	205	1543	4th in Northeast	Did not qualify
2005–06	64	22	37	5	49	207	254	1789	3rd in Northeast	Did not qualify
2006–07	64	39	19	6	84	227	208	1663	2nd in Northeast	Won in round 1 against Oklahoma City Blazers 4–3; Won in round 2 against Bossier-Shreveport Mudbugs 4–1; Lost in conference finals to Colorado Eagles 2–4
2007–08	64	39	21	4	82	214	177	1611	3rd in Northeast	Lost in round 1 to Texas Brahmas 1–2
2008–09	64	44	17	3	91	242	166	1432	1st in Northeast	Bye in round 1 Won in round 2 against Oklahoma City Blazers 4–2; Lost in conference finals to Colorado Eagles 2–4
2009–10	64	33	24	7	73	217	216	1363	4th in Northern	Lost in round 1 to Missouri Mavericks 1–2
2010–11	66	30	31	5	65	199	229	1598	6th in Berry	Lost in round 1 to Tulsa Oilers 2–3
2011–12	56	25	28	3	53	167	177	976	6th in SPHL	Lost in round 1 to Knoxville Ice Bears 1–2
2012–13	56	24	24	8	56	165	183	950	7th in SPHL	Lost in round 1 to Louisiana IceGators 1–2
2013–14	56	31	21	4	66	175	150	991	4th in SPHL	Lost in round 1 to Huntsville Havoc 1–2
2014–15	56	33	21	2	68	169	140	659	4th in SPHL	Won in round 1 against Pensacola Ice Flyers 2–1; Lost in finals to Knoxville Ice Bears 0–2
2015–16	56	28	18	10	66	151	161	668	3rd in SPHL	Won in quarterfinals against Louisiana IceGators 2–0; Lost in semifinals to Pensacola Ice Flyers 0–2
2016–17	56	32	21	3	67	172	162	735	5th in SPHL	Lost in quarterfinals against Huntsville Havoc 1–2
2017–18	56	29	25	2	60	193	181	964	7th in SPHL	Lost in quarterfinals against Huntsville Havoc 1–2

== Retired numbers ==
- 13 – Don Parsons
- 31 – Scott Brower
- 55 – Derek Landmesser

== Affiliation ==
From 2001 to 2006, the RiverKings were affiliated with the Toronto Maple Leafs organization. This involved accepting some players on assignment from the National Hockey League club.
