= Mississippi Surge =

- City: Biloxi, Mississippi
- League: Southern Professional Hockey League
- Operated: 2009–2014
- Home arena: Mississippi Coast Coliseum
- Colors: Blue, Gold, Metallic Silver, White
- Owner(s): Surge LLC (Tim Kerr)
- General manager: Tim Kerr
- Head coach: Jeff Bes
- Media: The Sun Herald

Franchise history
- 2009–2014: Mississippi Surge
- 2016–present: Roanoke Rail Yard Dawgs

Championships
- Playoff championships: 1 (2010–11)

The Mississippi Surge were a professional hockey team in the Southern Professional Hockey League that began play in the 2009–10 season and folded on May 2, 2014. Playing for five seasons, the Surge was based in Biloxi and home games were played at the Mississippi Coast Coliseum, also known as "The Power Plant".

== History ==
The Mississippi Surge began play 2009 following the suspension of operations of the Mississippi Sea Wolves of the ECHL. The folding of the Sea Wolves left South Mississippi without a hockey team or a professional sports team. A new team was announced to begin play in 2009 and the team held a name-the-team contest on their temporary webpage. On June 17, the Surge unveiled their name, logo, and colors. The team was to be coached by longtime Sea Wolves player and coach Steffon Walby.

The Surge had great success in its first season. After finishing first in the league at 34–14–8 at the end of the regular season, the Surge were presented the William B. Coffey Trophy as the regular season champions. The Surge advanced to the playoffs and faced the Columbus Cottonmouths in a series that they won 3–1. In the championship round the Surge were defeated by the Huntsville Havoc, sweeping the Surge 3–0. In addition to winning the William B. Coffey Trophy, the Surge also won many of the league's player awards. Steffon Walby was chosen as Coach of the Year, Steve Weidlich was chosen as Defenseman of the Year and was named team captain the following season, and Bill Zaniboni was chosen as the Goalie of the Year.

In the team's second year of operation, the Surge faced adversity with numerous injuries and call-ups of key players, but again managed to finish the season in first place with an overall record of 37–19. The Surge were again crowned the Regular Season Champions and received the 2010–11 William B. Coffey Trophy for the second year in a row. They played the Knoxville Ice Bears in the first round of the 2010–11 SPHL Playoffs and advanced to the President's Cup Finals after winning the series 3–2. In the SPHL Finals, the Surge were matched up against the second seed Augusta Riverhawks and swept the series 3–0 claiming their first President's Cup.

The Surge moved into their third year of operation under new ownership as the Pensacola Ice Flyers owner, Tim Kerr, bought the team from Coast Hockey LLC. Under new ownership, the Surge hired rookie head coach Jeff Bes. They went 29–24–3 in his first season.

During the off-season, Kerr informed fans that the team would need to reach 1,000 season ticket holders by the start of this season, to stay viable on the coast. He later had a meeting and told fans the number had been revised to 800 season ticket holders. Fans collaborated to achieve 816 season ticket holders. There was a counter visible to fans on the team's official website. The Surge have since removed the counter and it is not known how many season tickets have been sold.

On May 2, 2014, the Surge announced that they had officially suspended operations indefinitely and have since relocated to Roanoke to become the Rail Yard Dawgs.

== Season records ==
| Year | Position | GP | W | L | OTL | Pts | Pct | GF | GA | PIM | Coach | Result |
|---|---|---|---|---|---|---|---|---|---|---|---|---|
| 2009–10 | 1st | 56 | 34 | 14 | 8 | 76 | 0.607 | 168 | 139 | 1344 | Steffon Walby | Lost in Finals |
| 2010–11 | 1st | 56 | 37 | 19 | * | 74 | 0.660 | 207 | 157 | 1059 | Steffon Walby | League Champions |
| 2011–12 | 5th | 56 | 29 | 24 | 3 | 61 | 0.545 | 166 | 162 | 976 | Jeff Bes | Lost in Quarterfinals |
| 2012–13 | 6th | 56 | 25 | 23 | 8 | 58 | 0.518 | 152 | 156 | 1228 | Jeff Bes | Lost in Quarterfinals |
| 2013–14 | 8th | 56 | 22 | 28 | 6 | 50 | 0.446 | 140 | 186 | 963 | Jeff Bes | Lost in First Round |

*2010–11 season: no points were given for OTL

== Championships and awards ==
Since the team's debut in the 2009–10 SPHL season, the Surge and its players won three different championship trophies and numerous player awards.

=== Championships ===
| Year | League | Trophy |
|---|---|---|
| 2009–10 | SPHL | Commissioner's Cup |
| 2010–11 | SPHL | Commissioner's Cup |
| 2010–11 | SPHL | President's Cup |

=== '11 President's Cup Champions roster ===
Forwards
| No. | | Player | Pos. | Shoots | Height | Weight | Place of Birth |
|---|---|---|---|---|---|---|---|
| 7 | (Canada) | Michael Richard | C | | 5' 9" | 190 lbs. | Saint-Constant, Quebec |
| 9 | (Canada) | Matt Zultek | LW | L | 6' 4" | 210 lbs. | Mississauga, Ontario |
| 11 | (United States) | Chris Chambers | F | | 6' 3" | 200 lbs. | Crofton, Maryland |
| 13 | (Canada) | Mark Versteeg-Lytwyn | LW | L | 5' 11" | 190 lbs. | Sharon, Ontario |
| 14 | (United States) | Rob Campbell | F | | 5' 10" | 175 lbs. | Reading, Massachusetts |
| 15 | (United States) | Rusty Masters | C | L | 6' 0" | 185 lbs. | Grafton, Ontario |
| 16 | (United States) | Adam Bartholomay | F | R | 5' 11" | 216 lbs. | Agoura Hills, California |
| 23 | (United States) | Jeff Grant | F | | 6' 0" | 165 lbs. | Burlington, Massachusetts |
| 26 | (United States) | Jason Beeman | RW | R | 5' 11" | 213 lbs. | Los Angeles, California |
| 28 | (Canada) | Ryan McCarthy | C | | 5' 10" | 185 lbs. | Brampton, Ontario |

Defensemen
| # | | Player | Pos. | Shoots | Height | Weight | Place of Birth |
|---|---|---|---|---|---|---|---|
| 2 | (United States) | Shane Wagner | D | | 6' 0" | 190 lbs. | Stillwater, Minnesota |
| 3 | (Canada) | Jeff Winchester | D | L | 6' 2" | 205 lbs. | Dalhousie, New Brunswick |
| 5 | (Canada) | Greg Moore | D | | 5' 10" | 200 lbs. | Châteauguay, Quebec |
| 22 | (United States) | Glenn Cacaro | D | L | 6' 0" | 190 lbs. | Sioux Falls, South Dakota |
| 25 | (United States) | Jack Wolgemuth | D | | 6' 3" | 185 lbs. | Anchorage, Alaska |
| 27 | (United States) | Nick Klaren | D | | 6' 1" | 200 lbs. | North St. Paul, Minnesota |
| 42 | (Canada) | Steve Weidlich | D | L | 6' 2" | 210 lbs. | Edmonton, Alberta |

Goaltenders
| # | | Player | Pos. | Catches | Height | Weight | Place of Birth |
|---|---|---|---|---|---|---|---|
| 31 | (Canada) | Dan Earles | G | | 5' 11" | 175 lbs. | Penetang, Ontario |
| 33 | (United States) | Bill Zaniboni | G | R | 6' 1" | 210 lbs. | Plymouth, Massachusetts |

- Head Coach: Steffon Walby
- Player-Assistant: Steve Weidlich

=== Player Awards ===
2009–10 SPHL Goal-Tender of the Year: Bill Zaniboni
2009–10 SPHL Defenseman of the Year: Steve Wiedlich
2009–10 SPHL Coach of the Year: Steffon Walby
