= Augusta Lynx (1998–2008) =

- City: Augusta, Georgia
- League: ECHL
- Conference: American Conference
- Division: South Division
- Operated: 1998–2008
- Home arena: James Brown Arena
- Colors: Blue, black, silver, white
- Owners: (United States) Jan Hodges Burch, Robert Burch, Dan Troutman
- General manager: (United States) Dan Troutman
- Head coach: (Canada) John Marks
- Media: WRDW (AM), b-2 Network
- Affiliates: Tampa Bay Lightning (NHL), Norfolk Admirals (AHL)

Franchise history
- 1991–1998: Raleigh IceCaps
- 1998–2008: Augusta Lynx

The Augusta Lynx were a minor-league professional ice hockey team based in Augusta, Georgia. The Lynx played their home games at the James Brown Arena. The Lynx, who played in the ECHL, had affiliations with the Tampa Bay Lightning of the NHL and the Norfolk Admirals of the AHL.

The team was named for The Masters golf tournament held annually in Augusta, with the "Lynx" name a play on the golf term "hitting the links". The Lynx folded midway through the 2008–09 season on December 2, 2008, when it was announced that they were suspending operations and voluntarily relinquishing their league membership. The Lynx's failure marked the first time in the ECHL's history a franchise folded mid-season.

== History ==
The Augusta Lynx were formed in 1991 as the Raleigh IceCaps. The IceCaps moved to Augusta in 1998, a year after the Hartford Whalers moved to North Carolina, becoming the Carolina Hurricanes.

The Lynx were replaced in their market by the Augusta Riverhawks, a team in the Southern Professional Hockey League, which began operations with the 2010–11 season.

In 2025, Augusta was awarded an expansion team in the ECHL set to play in the 2027–28 season. This ECHL team will bring back the Augusta Lynx name, although they are a separate franchise.

== Season-by-season record ==
Note: GP = Games played, W = Wins, L = Losses, T = Ties, OTL = Overtime Losses, SOL = Shootout Losses, PTS = Points, PCT = Winning Percentage, GF = Goals for, GA = Goals against, PIM = Penalty Infraction Minutes

Season	League	Division	GP	W	L	T	OTL	SOL	PTS	PCT	GF	GA	PIM	Coach(es)	Post-season Result
1998–99	ECHL	Southeast	70	38	27	5	0	0	81	0.579	235	233	1984	Dan Wiebe	Lost in round 1 (Baton Rouge) 2–0
1999–00	ECHL	Southeast	70	34	31	0	5	0	73	0.486	243	248	1781	Dan Wiebe	Won round 1 (New Orleans) 2–1; Won round 2 (Florida) 3–2; Lost in round 3 (Greenville) 3–1
2000–01	ECHL	Southeast	72	36	29	7	0	0	79	0.549	259	253	1579	Scott MacPherson, Jim Burton	Lost in round 1 (New Orleans) 2–1
2001–02	ECHL	Southeast	72	36	26	10	0	0	82	0.569	218	224	1834	Jim Burton	Out of Playoffs
2002–03	ECHL	Southeast	72	27	39	6	0	0	60	0.417	203	256	1623	Jim Burton, David Wilkie	Out of Playoffs
2003–04	ECHL	Central	72	32	33	7	0	0	71	0.493	203	234	1510	Stan Drulia	Out of Playoffs
2004–05	ECHL	East	72	28	35	9	0	0	65	0.451	188	237	1232	Stan Drulia	Out of Playoffs
2005–06	ECHL	South	72	30	36	6	0	0	66	0.458	216	255	1475	Bob Ferguson	Lost in round 1 (Greenville) 2–0
2006–07	ECHL	South	72	39	29	0	1	3	82	0.569	258	265	1225	Bob Ferguson	Lost in round 1 (Charlotte) 2–0
2007–08	ECHL	South	72	32	35	0	1	4	69	0.479	200	223	1173	Bob Ferguson	Lost in round 1 (South Carolina) 3–2
2008–09	ECHL	South	18	6	10	0	1	1	14	0.389	39	70	471	John Marks	Team ceased operations December 2
Totals			716	338	330	50	8	8	742	0.449	2262	2498	15887		6 of 11 playoff appearances

== Final team roster ==
Forwards
#		Player	Position	Shoots	Date of birth	Place of birth
	(United States)	Aaron Slattengren ^	C	L	Dec. 28, 1981	Duluth, Minnesota, United States
9	(Canada)	Chris Lawrence	C	R	Feb. 5, 1987	Toronto, Ontario, Canada
10	(United States)	Scott Thauwald	LW	L	Oct. 26, 1984	Rochester, Minnesota, United States
17	(Canada)	Patrick Bordeleau	LW	L	Mar. 23, 1986	Montreal, Quebec, Canada
19	(Canada)	Brian Ihnacak	C	R	Apr. 10, 1985	Toronto, Ontario, Canada
20	(United States)	Chase Watson	F	L	Oct. 23, 1982	Media, Pennsylvania, United States
21	(United States)	Michael Mullen	RW	R	Jul. 16, 1983	Pittsburgh, Pennsylvania, United States
22	(Canada)	Justin Keller ^	LW	L	Mar. 4, 1986	Nelson, British Columbia, Canada
25	(Canada)	Travis Fuller	LW	L	Jan. 25, 1986	Whitney, Ontario, Canada
26	(United States)	Jason Bloomingburg (IR)	LW	L	Nov. 29, 1982	Canton, Michigan, United States
29	(United States)	Joel Hanson	F	R	Jun. 20, 1983	Elk River, Minnesota, United States
37	(United States)	A Dallas Steward	C	L	Feb. 11, 1980	Chippewa Falls, Wisconsin, United States
44	(United States)	A Matt Auffrey	RW	R	Jan. 3, 1986	Cincinnati, Ohio, United States

Defencemen
#		Player	Position	Shoots	Date of birth	Place of birth
2	(United States)	B.J. Crum	D	R	Aug. 6, 1983	Hampden, Massachusetts, United States
3	(United States)	Kevin Quick	D	L	Mar. 29, 1988	Buffalo, New York, United States
6	(United States)	Brock Wilson	D	L	Oct. 15, 1984	St. Louis, Missouri, United States
14	(United States)	C Tim Branham	D	L	May 10, 1981	Eagle River, Wisconsin, United States
27	(United States)	R.J. Linder	D	R	Nov. 9, 1983	St. Cloud, Minnesota, United States
55	(Canada)	Brent Henley	D	R	Aug. 30, 1980	Coquitlam, British Columbia, Canada

Goaltenders
#		Player	Position	Catches	Date of birth	Place of birth
1	(Canada)	Mike Brodeur	G	L	Mar. 30, 1983	Calgary, Alberta, Canada
34	(Finland)	Riku Helenius	G	L	Mar. 1, 1988	Palkane, Finland

^ - Currently Called Up

Staff
Title	Staff Member
Head coach	John Marks
Assistant coach	Dane Litke
Athletic trainer	Chad Weprin
Equipment Manager	Ryan Adamson
Director of Public Relations	A.J. Bembry
Director of Broadcasting	Anthony Langella
Director of Game Operations	James T. Warbington
