= 2010–11 SPHL season =

- League: Southern Professional Hockey League
- Sport: Ice hockey
- Duration: October 21, 2010–April 15, 2011

Regular season
- Season champions: Mississippi Surge
- Season MVP: Matt Auffrey (Augusta)
- Top scorer: Chris Leveille (Fayetteville)

Playoffs
- Finals champions: Mississippi Surge
- Finals runners-up: Augusta Riverhawks

SPHL seasons
- ← 2009–10 2011–12 →

The 2010–11 Southern Professional Hockey League season was the seventh season of the Southern Professional Hockey League. The season began October 21, 2010, and ended April 15, 2011, after a 56-game regular season and a six-team playoff. The Mississippi Surge captured their first SPHL championship.

== Preseason ==
The Augusta Riverhawks joined the SPHL, after the departure of the city's ECHL franchise two years prior.

== Teams ==
2010-11 Southern Professional Hockey League
Team	City	Arena
Augusta RiverHawks	Augusta, Georgia	James Brown Arena
Columbus Cottonmouths	Columbus, Georgia	Columbus Civic Center
Fayetteville FireAntz	Fayetteville, North Carolina	Cumberland County Crown Coliseum
Huntsville Havoc	Huntsville, Alabama	Von Braun Center
Knoxville Ice Bears	Knoxville, Tennessee	Knoxville Civic Coliseum
Louisiana IceGators	Lafayette, Louisiana	Cajundome
Mississippi Surge	Biloxi, Mississippi	Mississippi Coast Coliseum
Pensacola Ice Flyers	Pensacola, Florida	Pensacola Civic Center

== Map of teams ==
SPHL teams

== Regular season ==
=== Final standings ===
Team	GP	W	L	GF	GA	Pts
Mississippi Surge^{‡}	56	37	19	207	157	74
Augusta Riverhawks	56	35	21	203	177	70
Huntsville Havoc	56	30	26	168	158	60
Columbus Cottonmouths	56	29	27	169	171	58
Pensacola Ice Flyers	56	28	28	187	195	56
Knoxville Ice Bears	56	27	29	186	187	54
Fayetteville FireAntz	56	22	34	170	184	44
Louisiana IceGators	56	16	40	170	231	32

^{‡} William B. Coffey Trophy winners
Advanced to playoffs

=== Attendance ===
Team	Total	Games	Average
Huntsville	98,372	28	3,513
Knoxville	95,563	28	3,412
Fayetteville	93,056	28	3,323
Pensacola	84,433	28	3,015
Columbus	79,116	28	2,825
Mississippi	71,360	28	2,548
Louisiana	50,971	28	1,820
Augusta	45,853	28	1,637
League	618,724	224	2,762

== President's Cup playoffs ==
First round
1	Mississippi Surge	4	8	3*	2	3
6	Knoxville Ice Bears	6	1	2	4	1
3	Huntsville Havoc	2	4	x
4	Columbus Cottonmouths	4	5	x
5	Pensacola Ice Flyers	2	4	2
2	Augusta Riverhawks	5	2	6

Second round
4	Columbus Cottonmouths	0	7	2
2	Augusta Riverhawks	3	2	3

Final
1	Mississippi Surge	3	4*	5	x	x
2	Augusta Riverhawks	2	3	1	x	x

* indicates overtime game.

=== Finals ===
All times are local (EDT/CDT)

April 12, 2011; 7:05 pm	Augusta	2–3 (1–2, 0–0, 1–1)	Mississippi	Mississippi Coast Coliseum, Biloxi, MS; Attendance: 1,077

Game reference

Jon Olthuis
Goalies
Bill Zaniboni
Referees:
Thomas Chmielewski
Jacob Brenk, James Sanders

Travis Dunstall (Auffrey, Snetsinger) – pp – 9:20	1 – 0
	1 – 1	15:33 – Matt Zultek (Cacaro, Klaren)
	1 – 2	19:43 – pp – Jason Beeman (Klaren, Richard)
Neil Graham (Wynn, Tolles) – 47:22	2 – 2
	2 – 3	57:58 – Matt Zultek (Richard, Masters)

11 min
Penalties
15 min
26
Shots
39

April 13, 2011; 7:05 pm	Augusta	3 – 4 OT (0–0, 1–3, 0–2, 0–1)	Mississippi	Mississippi Coast Coliseum, Biloxi, MS; Attendance: 1,291

Game reference

Peter Skoggard
Goalies
Bill Zaniboni
Referees:
Brent Coulombe
James Sanders, Tyler Puddifant

	0 – 1	20:47 – Rusty Masters (Wolgemuth, Winchester)
Branden Kosolofsky (Dunstall, Auffrey) – pp – 29:55	1 – 1
Egor Mironov – 30:06	2 – 1
Matt Auffrey (Olidis, Price) – pp – 35:53	3 – 1
	3 – 2	41:24 – pp – Jason Beeman (Richard, Klaren)
	3 – 3	46:45 – Matt Zultek (Richard, Klaren)
	3 – 4	70:28 – Adam Bartholomy (Klaren, Cacaro)

14 min
Penalties
14 min
25
Shots
55

April 15, 2011; 7:30 pm	Mississippi	5–1 (1–0, 2–0, 2–1)	Augusta	James Brown Arena, Augusta, GA; Attendance: 2,251

Game reference

Bill Zaniboni
Goalies
Jon Olthuis
Referees:
Donald Jablonski Jr.
Jacob Brenk, Jason Schulz

Shane Wagner (Masters, Versteeg-Lytwyn) – 18:29	1 – 0
Mark Versteeg-Lytwyn (Grant) – 23:02	2 – 0
Jack Wolgemouth (McCarthy, Beeman) – 33:58	3 – 0
	3 – 1	41:17 – pp – Branden Kosolofsky (Snetsinger, Gehring)
Shane Wagner (Versteeg-Lytwyn) – 45:17	4 – 1
Mark Versteeg-Lytwyn (Masters, Wolgemouth) – pp – 47:35	5 – 1

10 min
Penalties
38 min
35
Shots
24

== Awards ==
The SPHL All-Rookie team was announced March 24, 2011, followed by the All-SPHL teams on March 25, Defenseman of the Year on March 28, Goaltender of the Year on March 29, Rookie of the Year on March 30, Coach of the Year on March 31, and MVP on April 1.

President's Cup:	Mississippi Surge
Coffey Trophy:	Mississippi Surge
League MVP:	Matt Auffrey (Augusta)
Rookie of the Year:	Chris Wilson (Pensacola)
Defenseman of the Year:	Mark van Vliet (Knoxville)
Goaltender of the Year:	Mark Sibbald (Huntsville)
Coach of the Year:	Brad Ralph (Augusta)

=== All-SPHL selections ===
1st Team All-SPHL

(Canada) F Chris Leveille (Fayetteville)
(Canada) F Chris Wilson (Pensacola)
(United States) F Matt Auffrey (Augusta)
(Canada) D Mark van Vliet (Knoxville)
(Canada) D Omar Pacha (Huntsville)
(Canada) G Mark Sibbald (Huntsville)

2nd Team All-SPHL

(United States) F Beau McLaughlin (Louisiana)
(Canada) F Michael Richard (Mississippi)
(United States) F Frank Furdero (Knoxville)
(United States) D Jack Wolgemuth (Mississippi)
(United States) D Luke Lucyk (Augusta)
(Canada) G Jon Olthuis (Augusta)

All-Rookie Team

(Canada) F Chris Wilson (Pensacola)
(Canada) F Neil Graham (Augusta)
(Canada) F Branden Kosolofsky (Augusta)
(Canada) D Omar Pacha (Huntsville)
(Canada) D Dan Ehrman (Pensacola)
(Canada) G Jon Olthuis (Augusta)
