= Stefon (disambiguation) =

Stefon may refer to:

- Stefon Adams, American former NFL player
- Stefon Alexander, American rapper that goes by the name P.O.S.
- Stefon Bristol, American film director
- Stefon Diggs, American NFL player
- Stefon Harris, American jazz vibraphonist
- Stefon Jackson, American former basketball player
- Stefon Meyers, a character played by Bill Hader on SNL
