= Augusta RiverHawks =

- City: Augusta, Georgia
- League: Southern Professional Hockey League
- Operated: 2010–2013
- Home arena: James Brown Arena
- Colors: Red, White, Blue
- Owners: Bob & Diane Kerzner

Franchise history
- 2010–2013: Augusta RiverHawks
- 2015–present: Macon Mayhem

Championships
- Regular season titles: 1 (2011–12)

The Augusta RiverHawks were a professional minor league ice hockey team based in Augusta, Georgia. They played in the Southern Professional Hockey League (SPHL) from 2010 to 2013. They played their home games at the James Brown Arena.

== History ==
The Augusta RiverHawks were established as a new franchise in the Southern Professional Hockey League in 2010 by Bob and Diane Kerzner, who had formerly owned a different franchise, the Pee Dee/Twin City Cyclones. The RiverHawks replaced the Augusta Lynx, who had played in the city for ten years in the ECHL before folding in 2008. The name "RiverHawks" was announced for the new club on March 13, 2010, as the winning result of a fan vote. The RiverHawks opened their inaugural season on the road on October 21, 2010, losing to the Fayetteville FireAntz. They had their home opener the following evening, against 2009–10 SPHL champions the Huntsville Havoc, ultimately losing 5–3, however they went on to place second in league by the season's close.

In late February 2013, the ice refrigeration system at the James Brown Arena malfunctioned, causing the ice surface to melt. This forced the RiverHawks to play their remaining home games at their practice facility, where attendance was limited to season ticket holders and sponsors. Team owner Bob Kerzner, the city of Augusta, and arena operator Global Spectrum could not reach an agreement on repairing or replacing the arena's ice system in time for the club to commit to the 2013–14 SPHL season, forcing Kerzner to temporarily suspend team operations. Kerzner stated that he would retain his franchise rights during the RiverHawks' hiatus, hoping to return to play in the 2014–15 season.

After considering relocating to either Greensboro, North Carolina, or Tallahassee, Florida, Kerzner, the SPHL, and the Macon-Bibb County Board of Commissioners announced on June 25, 2014, that the RiverHawks would relocate to Macon, Georgia, and resume play as the Macon Mayhem. The Mayhem signed a five-year lease with the city of Macon and played their home games in the Macon Coliseum starting in the 2015–16 season. The SPHL previously had a franchise in Macon called the Macon Trax during its inaugural 2004–05 season.
