= Louisiana IceGators (SPHL) =

Ice hockey team

- City: Lafayette, Louisiana
- League: Southern Professional Hockey League
- Founded: 2009
- Folded: 2016
- Home arena: "The Frozen Swamp" Cajundome
- Colors: Green, Gold, Black, White
- Owners: Chuck Anselmo Jr. & Chuck Anselmo III
- General manager: Louis Dumont
- Head coach: Drew Omicioli
- Media: Lafayette Daily Advertiser, KATC, KLFY

Franchise history
- 2009–2016: Louisiana IceGators
- 2018–present: Quad City Storm

Championships
- Regular season titles: 0

The Louisiana IceGators were a professional ice hockey team in the Southern Professional Hockey League that began play in the 2009–10 season. Like the original IceGators, which played from 1995 until folding in 2005, they were based in Lafayette, Louisiana. The IceGators were brought back by local businessman Danny Smith. In August 2010, Smith sold the team to two local businessmen, E.C. "Chuck" Anselmo, Jr. and E.C. "Chuck" Anselmo, III.

== History ==
For their first season as members of the SPHL, home games were played at the Blackham Coliseum rather than the Cajundome, the original home of the ECHL's IceGators. For the 2010–11 season, the team's home ice returned to the Cajundome, also called the "Frozen Swamp."

On October 26, 2009, Ron Handy stepped down as head coach after a 0-3-0 start. He was replaced by general manager Brent Sapergia on an interim basis. Sapergia was banned by the league after being disqualified from two games in a row. In Pensacola, Sapergia threw a water bottle onto the ice, then a water cooler, then a pair of medical kits. Sapergia finished the tirade by emptying Louisiana's supply of hockey sticks into play and giving a farewell gesture to the fans as he left the arena. Former Huntsville Havoc player and coach John Gibson was later named head coach, while Handy began to focus on community relations and off-ice operations. Gibson would coach 11 games before being replaced by Dave MacIsaac. MacIsaac would finish off the 2009–10 season, coaching 38 games, finishing with a record of 18-18-0.

On October 18, 2010, the IceGators affiliated with the New York Islanders of the National Hockey League for the 2010–11 season. During the 2010–11 season, MacIsaac would have 7 wins and 14 losses in 22 games before being let go. He was replaced in December 2010 by former NHL enforcer Kevin "Killer" Kaminiski. Also during this season, the IceGators brought back forward Shawn McNeil who had played for the ECHL IceGators from 1999 to 2003. The IceGators also started rookie goalie Scott Darling who would become the first SPHL player to play in the National Hockey League when he was called up by the Chicago Blackhawks during the 2014–15 NHL season. The Blackhawks won the Stanley Cup with Darling as a back-up to Corey Crawford.

In 2013–14, IceGators star player, Shawn McNeil, would play in 56 games achieving 18 goals and 49 assists at the age of 35. On April 3, 2014, Shawn was named the 2013–14 Easton SPHL Most Valuable Player. "McNeil led all players in points (67) and assists (49) and tied SPHL season-highs with an 18-game point streak and an eight-game assist streak. One of four IceGators to play all 56 games, McNeil was a team-best +18 as he led Louisiana to a second-place finish in the regular season."

On May 16, 2016, the IceGators' general manager and the SPHL announced that the team is suspending operations for the 2016–17 SPHL season due to planned Cajundome renovations. However, sometime after the announcement, the team shut down its headquarters, the website was taken down, and the team has not indicated a return. In 2018, the franchise was sold and became the Quad City Storm.

== Team record ==
=== Season-by-season records ===
As of the 2015–16 season

Season	GP	W	L	OTL	PTS	GF	GA	PIM	Finish	Playoffs
2009–10	56	23	31	2	48	175	223	1650	7th of 7, SPHL	Did not qualify
2010–11	56	16	40	0	32	170	231	1111	8th of 8, SPHL	Did not qualify
2011–12	56	24	27	5	53	177	202	943	7th of 9, SPHL	Lost in quarterfinals
2012–13	56	34	17	5	73	172	167	1145	2nd of 9, SPHL	Lost in semifinals
2013–14	56	35	18	3	73	198	175	1094	2nd of 10, SPHL	Lost in quarterfinals
2014–15	56	27	21	8	62	77	184	968	6th of 8, SPHL	Lost in semifinals
2015–16	56	26	26	4	56	151	162	1008	6th of 9, SPHL	Lost in quarterfinals

=== Attendance ===
Year	Total	Games	Average	League average
2009–10	54,779	28	1,956	3,041
2010–11	50,971	28	1,820	2,762
2011–12	56,514	28	2,018	2,796
2012–13	64,080	28	2,288	2,804
2013–14	66,438	28	2,372	3,000
2014–15	65,433	28	2,336	3,248
2015–16	59,063	28	2,109	3,034

== Team information ==
=== Captains ===
- 2009–10: Paul McBrien
- 2010–15: Shawn McNeil
- 2015–16: Jake Hauswirth/Mike Kavanagh

=== Coaching history ===
- 2009: Ron Handy (0-3-0)
- 2009: Brent Sapergia (2-2-0)
- 2009: John Gibson (3-8-0)
- 2009–11: David MacIsaac (25-33-2)
- 2011: Chris Valicevic (0-3-0)
- 2011–14: Kevin Kaminski (102-84-13)
- 2014–16: Drew Omicioli (27-21-8)

=== General Manager ===
- 2009–10: Brent Sapergia
- 2010–11: Dave Berryman
- 2011–present: Louis Dumont

=== SPHL awards ===
==== 2010–11 ====
- Beau McLaughlin: All-SPHL Second Team

==== 2011–12 ====
- Brayden Metz: All-SPHL Rookie Team
- Jason Hill: All-SPHL Second Team

==== 2012–13 ====
- Riley Gill: SPHL Goalie of the Year Award Winner, All-SPHL First Team
- Matt Robertson: All-SPHL First Team
- Kirk Byczynski: All-SPHL Second Team, All-SPHL Rookie Team

==== 2013–14 ====
- Shawn McNeil: Easton Most Valuable Player, All-SPHL First Team
- Kirk Byczynski: All-SPHL Second Team

==== 2015–16 ====
- Jake Hauswirth: All-SPHL Second Team
- Zac Frischmon: All-SPHL Rookie Team
