= Fayetteville Marksmen =

American ice hockey team

- City: Fayetteville, North Carolina
- League: SPHL
- Founded: 2002
- Home arena: Crown Coliseum
- Colors: Black, orange, olive, cream
- Owner: Charles "Chuck" Norris
- Head coach: Kyle Sharkey
- Media: The Fayetteville Observer

Franchise history
- 2002–2004: Cape Fear FireAntz
- 2004–2017: Fayetteville FireAntz
- 2017–present: Fayetteville Marksmen

Championships
- Regular season titles: 1 (2012–13)
- Playoff championships: 1 (2006-07)

The Fayetteville Marksmen are a professional minor league ice hockey team based in Fayetteville, North Carolina. They currently play in the SPHL and play their home games in the Crown Coliseum.

The team, originally known as the Cape Fear FireAntz, began play in the Atlantic Coast Hockey League in the 2002–03 season. After the league's collapse, they joined the South East Hockey League for the 2003–04 season and then what would become the SPHL in 2004 as the Fayetteville FireAntz. Since their inception, they have won the 2007 SPHL championship and made a number of playoff appearances.

Due to the effects of the COVID-19 pandemic, the Marksmen were one of several SPHL teams to not participate in the 2020–21 season.

== History ==
=== ACHL and SEHL years ===
The team, then known as the Cape Fear FireAntz, joined the fledgling Atlantic Coast Hockey League for the 2002–03 season. Their first coach was Shawn Ulrich. After the season David Waronker announced he was withdrawing his four teams from the unstable league to form the World Hockey Association 2. The FireAntz and other remaining ACHL teams formed the South East Hockey League. They played the SEHL for the 2003–04 season, with Scott Rex serving as coach.

=== SPHL ===
==== Fayetteville FireAntz ====
Primary logo, 2004–2017

In 2004, teams from the SEHL and WHA2 joined together to form the league now known as the Southern Professional Hockey League. The FireAntz joined the new league, changing their name to Fayetteville FireAntz, abandoning the reference to the nearby Cape Fear River. Derek Booth took over as head coach in 2004 and after two seasons behind the bench, he left to coach the Bloomington Prairie Thunder of the United Hockey League.

In the 2006–07 season, under the guidance of head coach John Marks, the FireAntz advanced to the finals of the league's post-season playoffs for the first time in team history. The first two games of the best-of-five finals were won by Fayetteville on the FireAntz' home ice, before the series returned to Jacksonville, Florida, where the Jacksonville Barracudas won game three of the series by a 3–2 score. The FireAntz won the fourth game of the series by a score of 5–3 to win the President's Cup. It was the first championship for the FireAntz, and Fayetteville's first professional sports championship in 51 years. Head coach Marks resigned after the team's championship run to take the head coach position with the Pensacola Ice Pilots of the ECHL. Shortly after Marks' resignation the FireAntz announced that former Florida Seals coach, Tommy Stewart, had been hired to coach the team for the 2007–2008 season.

Tommy Stewart was let go after the 2010–11 season and was soon replaced by Rio Grande Valley Killer Bees' assistant coach, Sean Gillam. Gillam would only last partway through the season; on February 17, 2012, the FireAntz replaced him with Todd Bidner.

Mark DeSantis was hired prior to the 2012–13 season. He led the team to regular season record in the league and won William B. Coffey Trophy and the SPHL's Coach of the Year. However, he left the team after only one season to become the head coach of an expansion team in his hometown, the Brampton Beast.

Greg McCauley was then hired to replace DeSantis for the 2013–14 season but resigned for personal reasons after 32 games. He was replaced by Emery Olauson, who was then kept on until the end of the 2014–15 season.

On May 26, 2015, Jeff Bes was hired as the head coach prior to the 2015–16 season.

==== Fayetteville Marksmen ====
On February 13, 2017, Jeffrey M. Longo was hired as the general manager. Later in the 2016–17 season, Longo and local entrepreneur Chuck Norris purchased the FireAntz from the seven-person ownership group, Cape Fear Pro Hockey. At the end of the season, the new owners changed the name of the FireAntz to the Fayetteville Marksmen. The change reflects the city of Fayetteville's relationship with the local United States Army post, Fort Bragg, as well as the native Carolina red fox.

In June 2017, head coach Jeff Bes decided to not re-sign with the team to be closer to his family. He was replaced by Nick Mazzolini but only lasted until November 23 when he was replaced by Phil Esposito, the recent head coach of the Watertown Wolves. Esposito would also last less than a season and was relieved of duties on February 21, 2018, after a 5–19–4 record and in last place in the SPHL. John Bierchen took over as head coach on an interim basis for the remainder of the season.

The Marksmen then hired Jesse Kallechy as the permanent head coach for the 2018–19 season where the Marksmen finished the season with the final playoff spot. In the 2019–20 season, Kallechy had led the team to competing for the President's Trophy for the regular season championship until the season was curtailed by the onset of the COVID-19 pandemic in March 2020. Kallechy win the 2020 SPHL Coach of the Year and was then hired by the Florida Everblades in the ECHL as an assistant coach. Kellechy was replaced by Marksmen assistant coach Cory Melkert during the 2020 offseason. The Marksmen were then one of five SPHL teams to opt out of participating in the 2020–21 pandemic-delayed season due to capacity restrictions at their home arena.

== Championships ==
Season	League	Trophy
2006–07	SPHL	President's Cup
2012–13	SPHL	Coffey Trophy

== Honors ==
Season	League	Personnel	Award
2004–05	SPHL	Derek Booth	Coach of the Year
2004–05	SPHL	Chad Collins	Rookie of the Year
2005–06	SPHL	Mike Clarke	Defenseman of the Year
2006–07	SPHL	Tim Velemirovich	Rookie of the Year
2006–07	SPHL	Rob Sich	SPHL MVP
2006–07	SPHL	John Marks	Coach of the Year
2006–07	SPHL	Chad Collins	SPHL Playoff MVP
2012–13	SPHL	Josh McQuade	SPHL MVP
2012–13	SPHL	Andrew Smale	Defenseman of the Year
2012–13	SPHL	Mark DeSantis	Coach of the Year
2016–17	SPHL	Sean Bonar	SPHL MVP and Goaltender of the Year
2018–19	SPHL	Travis Jeke	SPHL Defensemen of the Year
2019–20	SPHL	Jesse Kallechy	SPHL Coach of the Year
2022-23	SPHL	Austin Alger	Rookie of the Year
