= Crown Complex =

Arena in North Carolina, United States

Coordinates: 35.015124°N 78.891714°W

Crown Coliseum

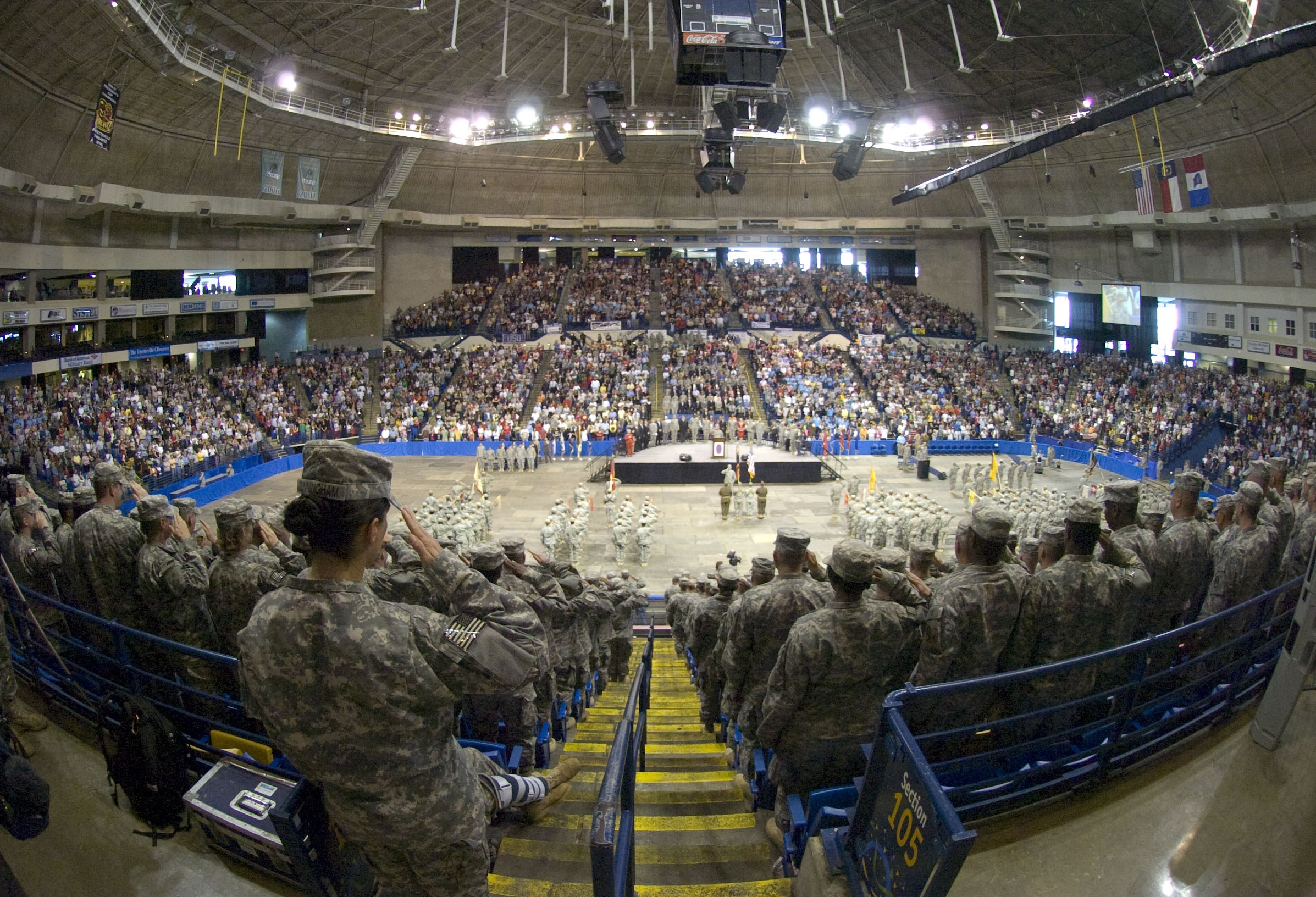
- Interior of the Crown Coliseum arena during the departure ceremony for the 30th Heavy Brigade Combat Team (c. 2009)

- Location within North Carolina Location within the United States
- Former names: Cumberland County Crown Coliseum (1997–2014)
- Address: 1960 Coliseum Drive; Fayetteville, North Carolina (Coliseum and Expo Center) 28306-3059; 2484+M4; Fayetteville, North Carolina 28306 (arena and theater)
- Location: Crown Complex
- Owner: Cumberland County Civic Center Commission
- Operator: Comcast Spectacor
- Capacity: 10,000 (coliseum); 4,500 (arena); 2,400 (theater)

Construction
- Groundbreaking: June 12, 1995 (coliseum)
- Built: 1960s (arena and theater)
- Opened: October 23, 1997 (coliseum)
- Cost: $55 million ($116 million in 2025 dollars)
- Architect: Odell Associates
- Structural engineers: Fleming and Associates, PA
- General contractor: Turner Construction

Tenants
- Fayetteville Marksmen (SPHL) (2002–present); Fayetteville Liberty (TBL) (2026–present); Fayetteville Force (CHL) (1997–2001); Cape Fear Wildcats (AF2) (2002–2004); Fayetteville Guard (NIFL/AIFA) (2005–2010); Cape Fear Heroes (AIF/X-League/SIF/AAL) (2012–2019); Fayetteville Fury (NISL) (2021–2024)

Website
- Venue Website

The Crown Complex (originally the Cumberland County Crown Coliseum) is a multi-purpose venue in Fayetteville, North Carolina that includes the Crown Coliseum, an indoor stadium. The stadium broke ground in 1995 and opened in 1997, and is currently home to the Fayetteville Marksmen ice hockey team. The Coliseum replaced the Crown Arena in the same complex as the main venue for sports events. In addition to serving the Fayetteville area, it is also the closest indoor arena to the Cape Fear region, which lacks a large-scale indoor sports and entertainment venue of its own, with "Cape Fear" teams having played in the Coliseum in the past, including the af2's Cape Fear Wildcats.

The complex also contains a 2,400-seat auditorium named the Crown Theater and a 4,500-seat venue named Crown Arena, both of which were built in the 1960s. On January 22, 2020, Cumberland County's commissioner announced that the Crown Arena and Crown Theater would close in October 2022 due to the venues' non-compliance with the ADA, but would not affect the Coliseum. The closing was pushed back to November 2025.

During the early stages of its construction, Crown Coliseum was mentioned as a possible temporary home for the NHL's Carolina Hurricanes, but this was blocked by minor league hockey executive Bill Coffey who had signed an exclusive lease agreement with the arena for the Fayetteville Force of the Central Hockey League.

It was reported in mid-January that TNA Wrestling would be taping its weekly TNA iMPACT! broadcast in the arena on February 24, 2011 — which would be only the second time in its history that the show would be broadcast outside Universal Studio's iMPACT! zone in Orlando, Florida. WWE taped its annual Tribute to the Troops show at the venue on December 11, 2011.

German-born rapper J. Cole, who was raised in Fayetteville, recorded his Forest Hills Drive: Live and his concert film, Forest Hills Drive: Homecoming was recorded at the arena on August 30, 2015, during his Forest Hills Drive Tour. Forest Hills Drive: Homecoming aired on HBO, January 9, 2016. Cole returned to the Crown Coliseum on September 23, 2026 for the last show of the North American leg of The Fall-Off Tour.

Preceded by Florence Civic Center	Home of the Fayetteville Guard; 2005 – 2010	Succeeded by Last arena
