= James Brown Arena =

Former arena complex in Georgia, United States

Coordinates: 33°28′12″N 81°57′59″W

- Interactive map of James Brown Arena
- Location: 601 7th Street; Augusta, GA 30901
- Owner: Augusta–Richmond County Coliseum Authority
- Operator: Global Spectrum
- Capacity: (James Brown Arena): 9,167; 6,557 (hockey); 7,255 (basketball)

Construction
- Groundbreaking: 1968
- Opened: 1974 (Exhibition hall); January 24, 1980 (Arena)
- Closed: May 31, 2024
- Cost: $11 million ($71.8 million in 2025 dollars)
- Architects: Pei Cobb Freed & Partners; Holroyd, Johnson, Hughes, Beattie & Davis
- Structural engineer: LeMessurier Associates
- Services engineer: Cosentini Associates LLP

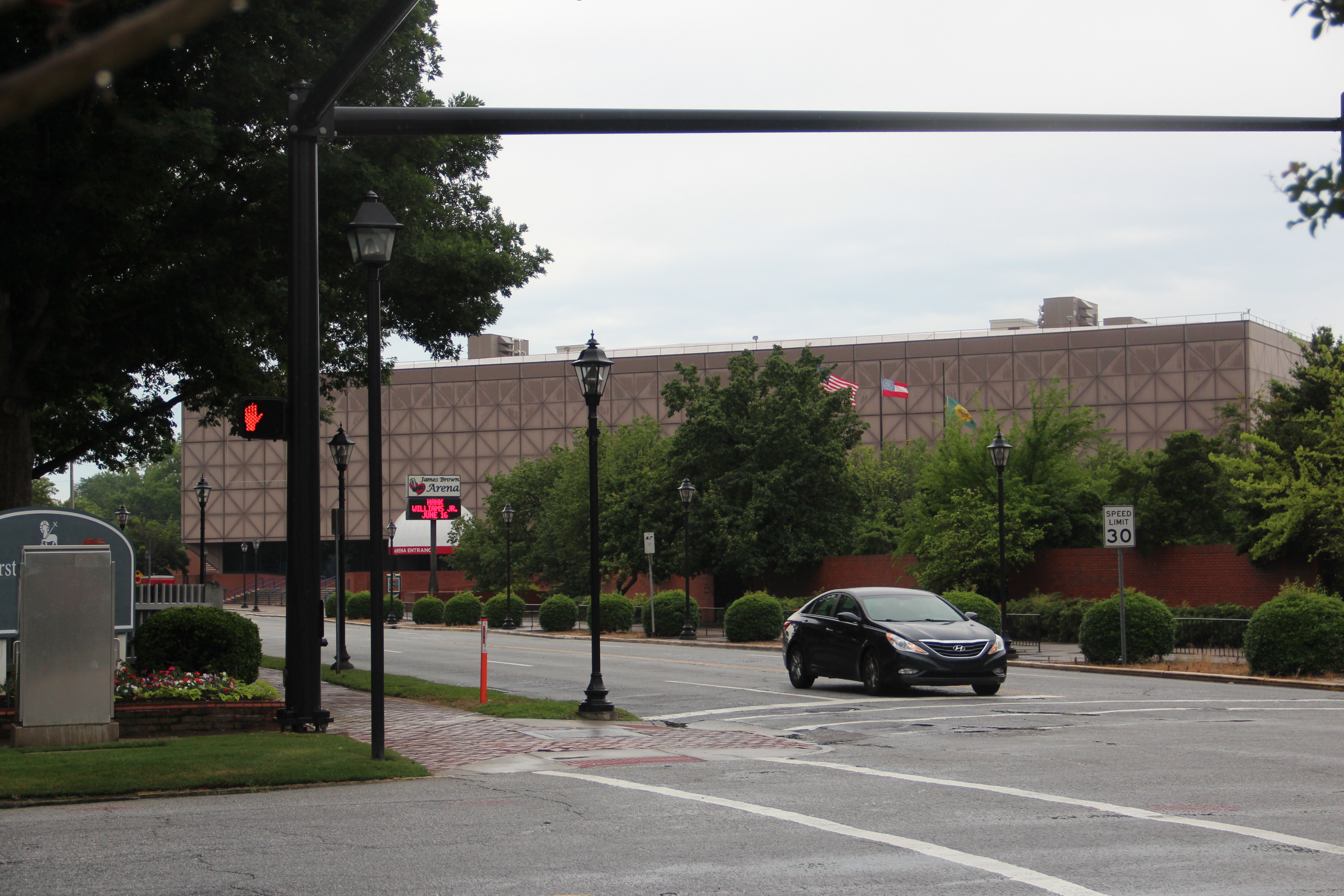
James Brown Arena in 2017

James Brown Arena (formerly known as Augusta-Richmond County Civic Center) was a multi-purpose complex located in Augusta, Georgia. It was managed by Spectra Experiences. The arena opened on January 24, 1980, and closed on May 31, 2024.

The arena seated 8,000 and was renamed the James Brown Arena, in honor of musician James Brown, on August 22, 2006. The James Brown Arena was the home of the ECHL's Augusta Lynx from 1998 to 2008, the AF2's Augusta Stallions from 2000 to 2002, Augusta Colts in 2008, and the Southern Professional Hockey League's Augusta RiverHawks from 2010 to 2013.

The arena hosted many concerts and pro wrestling events, including ECW's December to Dismember in 2006. Acts which played the arena include Elton John, Van Halen, Rush, Heart, Bob Seger, REO Speedwagon, Kiss, Bon Jovi, Molly Hatchet, John Cougar, Kansas, Charlie Daniels Band, Alabama, Blackfoot, Mother's Finest, Ratt, Mötley Crüe, Def Leppard, Cheap Trick, Marshall Tucker Band, and Loverboy.

The center-hung Fair Play scoreboard dated back to the arena's opening in 1980.

== Replacement ==
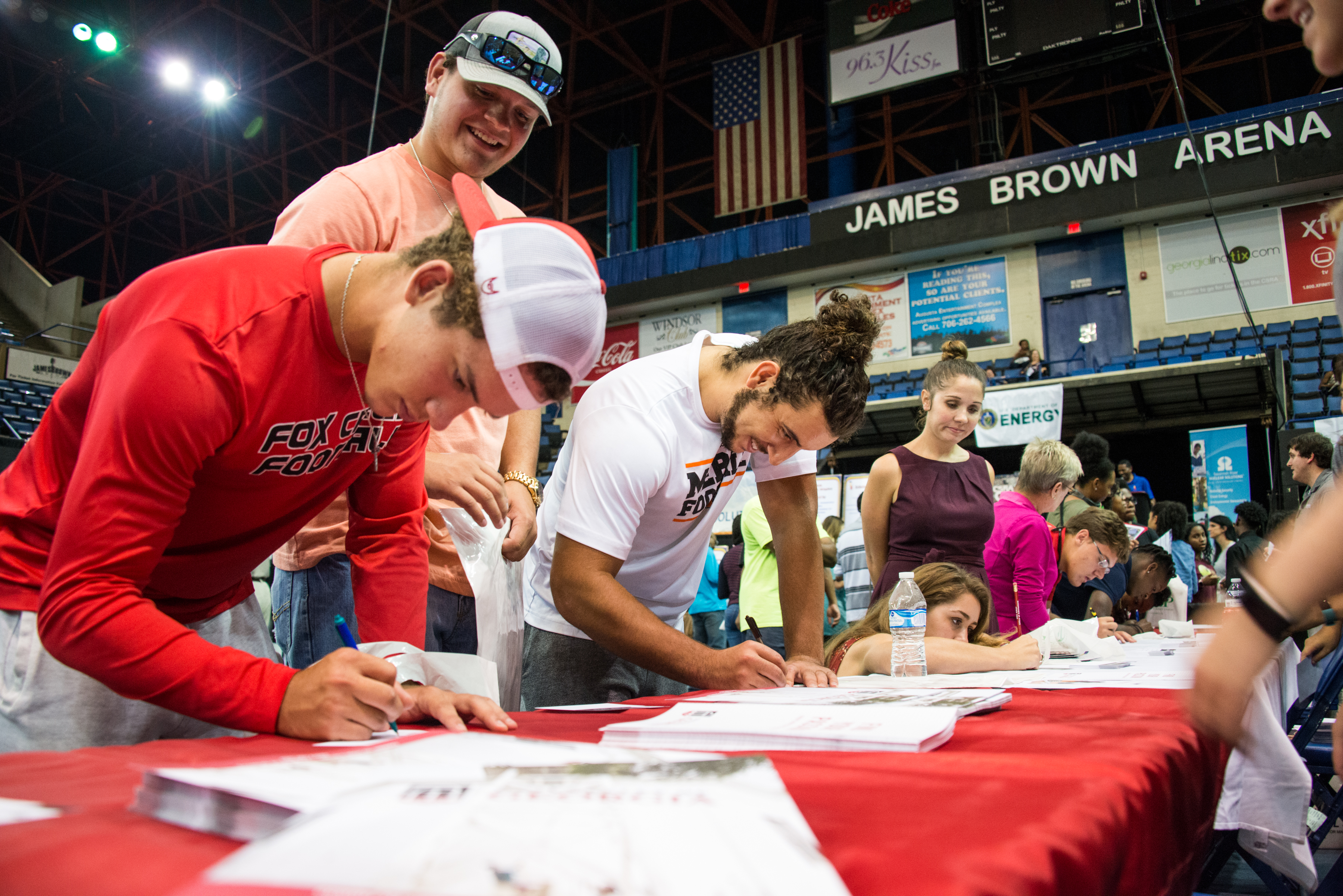
Local high school students attend CSRA College Night at the James Brown Arena.

In August 2017, the Augusta-Richmond County Coliseum Authority voted 4–2 to relocate the James Brown Arena to the former Regency Mall location off on Gordon Highway in South Augusta. The proposed site called for a new development at the Regency Mall site called Regency Town Center & Park. The development would feature a new James Brown Arena, new retail shops and restaurants, and new apartments as well. Augusta Mayor Hardie Davis was a key proponent of the move as he pushed for more redevelopment efforts in the Gordon Highway area in an area he called SOGO (South of Gordon Highway). Soon following the Coliseum Authority's vote, local residents launched the "Save The J" campaign which advocated for keeping the James Brown Arena at its current location in Downtown Augusta.

Augusta commissioners voted down the proposed site in a December 2017 before ultimately deciding to put the question of the new JBA location on the Republican and Democratic primary ballots as a non-binding referendum in May 2018. Augustans voted 57% to 43% to keep the JBA at its current location in Downtown Augusta.

Plans soon began to be developed for a new arena to be constructed on the current site before plans were revealed in early 2021 for a new arena. The new arena plans call for a 10,000 seat capacity featuring meeting rooms, twelve suites, and a new connector between the Bell Auditorium and the James Brown Arena all with an estimated cost of $228 million for construction.

The new arena was on the November 2021 ballot for a bond referendum vote. Had the bond referendum passed, the estimated time of completion would have been Fall 2024. Despite low voter turnout, the bond referendum was rejected, forcing the Coliseum Authority to look for alternate sources of funding.

In the November 2023 elections, Richmond County residents voted in favor of levying a half-cent special-purpose local-option sales tax to cover the cost of the new arena. The old arena's final public event was the 2024 commencement ceremony for Augusta Technical College, held on May 31, 2024; the reopening of the Bell Auditorium following its $20 million renovation coincided with the arena's closure. The groundbreaking ceremony for the New Augusta Arena was held on June 25, 2024. After two months of interior demolition, construction crews began exterior demolition of the old arena in early December 2024. By mid-May 2025, the old arena's superstructure has been removed completely, with grading taking place on the site before vertical construction of the new arena begins.

== Incidents ==
In late February 2013, the arena's ice system malfunctioned, causing all of the arena's ice to melt. As a result, following the playing of the remaining 2012-13 regular season home games at the RiverHawks practice facility, the Augusta RiverHawks suspended operations for the 2013–14 season. After team owner Bob Kerzner, the city of Augusta, and Global Spectrum failed to reach an agreement on how to replace the $1.2 million ice system as well as compensation for the remaining home games lost to the system's failure, Kerzner and the SPHL announced that the RiverHawks would move to Macon and resume play as the Macon Mayhem for the 2015-16 SPHL season.

On November 18, 2022, the arena was evacuated before a concert was scheduled to begin after a gas leak was discovered, which resulted in the death of a maintenance worker who was servicing the arena's HVAC system. In April 2023, an autopsy report by the Richmond County Coroner confirmed that the arena employee had died of asphyxiation from leaked refrigerant; the coroner also noted that the decedent had a pre-existing health condition which also contributed to their death.

== See also ==
- James Brown statue
- Imperial Theatre (Augusta, Georgia)

Events and tenants
Preceded by Fair Park Arena; Dothan Civic Center	Ultimate Fighting Championship venue UFC 11; UFC 13	Succeeded by Fair Park Arena; Boutwell Memorial Auditorium
