= Easton =

Easton may refer to:

== Places ==
=== Canada ===
- Easton, Nova Scotia

=== United Kingdom ===
- Easton, Bristol
- Easton, Cambridgeshire
- Easton, Dorset
- Great Easton, Essex and Little Easton, Essex
- Easton, Hampshire
  - Crux Easton, Hampshire
- Easton, Isle of Wight
- Great Easton, Leicestershire
- Easton, Lincolnshire
- Easton, Norfolk
- Easton Maudit, Northamptonshire
- Easton Neston, Northamptonshire
- Easton on the Hill, Northamptonshire
- Easton, Somerset, near Wells
- Easton in Gordano, Somerset
- Easton, Suffolk
- Easton Bavents, Suffolk
- In the county of Wiltshire:
  - Easton, Bishops Cannings, Wiltshire, near Devizes
  - Easton, Corsham, Wiltshire
  - Easton, Pewsey Vale, a parish
    - Easton Royal, village in the parish
  - Easton Grey, between Malmesbury and Sherston
  - Easton Town, Wiltshire, near Sherston

=== United States ===
- Easton, California, a census-designated place in Fresno County
  - Easton, a former town in San Mateo County now part of Burlingame, California
- Easton, Connecticut
- Easton, Georgia, a former town located in what is now Atlanta
- Easton, Illinois
- Easton, Kansas
- Easton, Maine
- Easton, Maryland
- Easton, Massachusetts
- Easton, Minnesota
- Easton, Missouri
- Easton, New Hampshire
- Easton, New York
- Easton, Ohio
- Easton, Pennsylvania
- Easton, Texas
- Easton, Washington
- Easton, West Virginia
- Easton, Adams County, Wisconsin, a town
- Easton (community), Wisconsin, an unincorporated community
- Easton, Marathon County, Wisconsin, a town
- Easton Town Center, a development in Columbus, Ohio
- Easton Township, Michigan

== People ==
- Easton (surname), includes a list of notable people
- Easton Corbin, American country music singer
- Easton Cowan, Canadian ice hockey player
- Easton Mascarenas-Arnold (born 2002), American football player
- Easton Ongaro (born 1998), Canadian soccer player
- Easton Royal (American football) (born 2009), American football player
- Easton Stick (born 1995), American football player

== Brands and enterprises ==
- Easton Archery, American manufacturer of archery equipment
- Easton Sports, former American sporting goods manufacturer
- Easton-Bell Sports, former name of BRG Sports
- Easton Helsinki, shopping centre in Helsinki, Finland
- Easton Press, American book publisher

== Other uses ==
- Easton's theorem
- Easton (horse)

== See also ==
- Eastern (disambiguation)
- Western (disambiguation)
- Weston (disambiguation)
