= Easton Sports =

American sports equipment company

Easton Sports, Inc.
- Industry: Sports equipment
- Predecessor: Curley-Bates Co.
- Founded: September 3, 1985
- Defunct: October 16, 2014
- Fate: Hockey, baseball, and cycling divisions sold off separately
- Headquarters: 7855 Haskell Avenue, Van Nuys, California
- Parent: Jas. D. Easton, Inc. (1985–2006); Easton-Bell Sports Inc. (2006–2014)

Easton Sports, Inc. was an American sports equipment company that existed from 1985 to 2014. Easton was formed as a subsidiary of Jas. D. Easton, Inc. (Easton Archery) through the acquisition and renaming of the Curley-Bates Co. The company grew to become a major player in baseball and hockey equipment production. In the early 2000s, around 40 percent of National Hockey League players used Easton sticks.

In March 2006, the holding company Riddell Bell Holdings, Inc., a portfolio company of the private equity firm Fenway Partners, acquired Easton Sports for $400 million. At this time, the holding company changed its name to Easton-Bell Sports. In 2014, Easton-Bell decided to focus on its action sports companies, Bell, Riddell, and Giro. That year, Easton Sports was split into separate hockey, baseball, and cycling companies and sold off in parts. After the disposal of Easton, Easton-Bell Sports was renamed BRG Sports.

Although Easton Sports was disestablished in 2014, the Easton name remains in use as a baseball products subsidiary of Rawlings, a hockey products subsidiary of Bauer Hockey, and a bicycle products subsidiary of Fox Factory. Easton Archery, a separate company remains owned by the original Easton Family.

== Jas. D. Easton ownership, 1985–2006 ==
=== Early Easton operations ===
Easton Sports, Inc. originated in the archery company Jas. D. Easton, Inc., which was founded in 1953 by James Douglas "Doug" Easton (1907–1972). In 1922, while recuperating from a shotgun accident, Easton read the book Hunting with the Bow and Arrow by Saxton Pope, and soon began making bows and arrows. In 1932, Easton moved to Los Angeles and opened Easton's Archery Shop. In the late 1930s, he began experimenting with aluminum as a material. In 1953 he incorporated Jas. D. Easton Inc. and opened a 10,000 square-foot manufacturing facility in Van Nuys.

In 1960, Doug's son James L. "Jim" Easton (1935–2023) joined the company. The previous year, Jim had graduated from the University of California, Los Angeles with a degree in engineering. In 1964, Easton began manufacturing aluminum ski poles, and then in 1969 began making aluminum baseball bats. After Doug Easton's death on New Year's Eve 1972, Jim Easton took over as company president.

In the early 1970s, Easton manufactured aluminum baseball bats under license for other companies, and then in the mid-1970s began selling bats under its own name. In 1976 it began making tent frames, and in 1978 produced aluminum tennis racquet frames for Prince Sports. During the late 1970s, an Easton engineer who played hockey began working on an aluminum hockey stick shaft. The stick received approval to be used in the National Hockey League in 1981, and in 1982 went into use. In 1983 Easton purchased Hoyt Archery.

=== Easton Sports ===
In 1985 Jas. D. Easton acquired the Curley-Bates Company, which was the distributor of its baseball bats. Curley-Bates had been founded in San Francisco in 1924 by Wallace Jantzen Bates (1899–1985) and Clyde James Curley (1893–1961). Jim Easton renamed Curley-Bates as Easton Sports Inc., and set out to turn the company into a major team sports manufacturer. In 1986, Doug Kelly was appointed president of Easton Sports. That same year, Easton Sports formed a Canadian subsidiary called Easton Sports Canada, which manufactured mast and boom tubing for sailboats. Then in 1987, Easton Sports opened a new automated warehouse in Salt Lake City.

Among the first NHL players to use Easton sticks were Brett Hull and Brian Leetch, who adopted them in the late 1980s. In 1990, the company signed a seven-year, $2 million deal with Wayne Gretzky to use an aluminum Easton stick in lieu of the wood Titan he had used the previous seven years. Also in 1990, Will Clark signed with the company as its brand ambassador for baseball. By 1994, around 150 NHL players used Easton sticks, and by 2000 around 40 per cent of the NHL used Easton. In 2001, Easton introduced its Synergy hockey stick. The Synergy became one of the most widely used and iconic sticks in the history of the game. In 2005, Easton released the Easton Stealth. In 2007, the iconic Stealth CNT (Carbon Nanotube Technology) was released.

In 1994, Jim Easton's son, Gregory J. Easton, took over from Doug Kelly as president. In 1999, Easton Sports began producing wooden baseball bats after it acquired Stix Baseball Inc. of Orlando, Florida.

== Fenway Partners ownership, 2006–2014 ==
In July 2003, the private equity firm Fenway Partners acquired the Riddell Sports Group for $100 million from Lincolnshire Management, who had owned the company since June 2001. Then, in September 2004, Fenway Partners acquired the Bell Sports Corporation for around $240 million. Fenway created a new company, Riddell Bell Holdings Inc., as a holding company for Riddell and Bell, which were made subsidiaries.

In March 2006, Fenway acquired Easton Sports Inc. for around $400 million. Riddell Bell Holdings then renamed itself Easton-Bell Sports Inc., while Easton Sports became a third subsidiary company. As part of the acquisition, the Ontario Teachers' Pension Plan acquired a 30 per cent stake in Easton-Bell Sports. After the purchase, the structure of the organization was as follows:

Fenway Partners

Easton-Bell Sports, Inc.

Easton Sports, Inc.
Riddell Sports Group, Inc.
Bell Sports Corporation

Despite the change in ownership, the company continued to be managed and run by the Easton family. Upon the sale, Jim Easton was elected chairman of Easton-Bell Sports. Over the next eight years, Easton Sports' importance in the portfolio diminished gradually.

== Sale of Easton, 2014 ==
After losing a helmet concussion lawsuit by Easton-Bell Sport's Riddell football division in April of 2013, Easton-Bell Sports began a process selling assets while the lawsuit appeal was undertaken. At the time of the Colorado lawsuit judgement, there were 41 concussion lawsuits pending against EBS including plaintiffs such as the NFL Players Association. This was the time EBS sought to sell Easton. First was to split Easton Hockey from Easton Baseball since a buyer could not be found for both Baseball and Hockey (cycling operated independently already). Easton's three main divisions – hockey, baseball/softball, and cycling – were turned into independent companies and sold individually.

=== Easton Diamond ===
In February 2014, Easton-Bell sold the Easton baseball and softball operations to Bauer Performance Sports, the holding company of Bauer Hockey, for $330 million in cash. The baseball operations were renamed Easton Diamond Sports LLC. After the deal closed on April 15, Easton-Bell Sports renamed itself BRG Sports. In November 2020, Rawlings acquired Easton Diamond.

=== Easton Cycling ===
In May 2014, BRG sold Easton Cycling to Christopher J. Tutton, who owned Race Face Performance Products also. Then, in December 2014, Tutton sold Easton Cycling and Race Face to Fox Factory.

=== Easton Hockey ===
In August 2014, a deal was struck to sell Easton Sports, Inc., whose sole remaining property was its hockey arm, to Chartwell Investments. Mary J. George, a member of the Easton Bell Sports Board of Directors, also sat on the Executive Council of Chartwell Investments.

According to un-named sources cited in The New York Post, "BRG’s motivation to sell to a buyer with little money may be to have a smaller balance sheet, with potentially fewer assets to target in pending lawsuits" After the sale, on 16 October 2014, Easton Sports Inc. changed its name to Easton Hockey Inc. To execute the deal, Chartwell received a $20 million loan. The company was later renamed Easton Hockey Holdings, Inc. Chartwell owned the company for only 17 months, during which time it struggled financially. In January 2016, the Performance Sports Group (the owners of Bauer Hockey) acquired Easton Hockey Holdings including the brand and IP for $10.4 million. Since the acquisition, Bauer has used the Easton name only on special edition products.
