= 2018 NRA boycott =

Social media activism campaign in the US

In February 2018, a boycott emerged against the U.S. gun rights advocacy group National Rifle Association of America (NRA) and its business affiliates. The boycott and social media activism campaign arose in the aftermath of the Parkland high school shooting in Parkland, Florida. The NRA was criticized for its response, including its recommendation for schools to arm teachers and opposition to bans on certain weapons. Calls for companies to sever their ties to the NRA resulted in several companies discontinuing their business relationships with the NRA and cancelling discount programs offered to NRA members. The boycott extended to Canada where Mountain Equipment Co-op and the Running Room cut supplier relationships with Vista Outdoor. Public pressure also caused a number of gun retailers to increase the age required to buy firearms and place other restrictions on gun sales.

== Background ==
After the Parkland shooting, there was an unprecedented upsurge of public support for gun control advocacy groups and significant backlash against the NRA for its response to the shooting, having argued that schools required more armed security to protect against the possibility of future attacks, and its continued calls to preserving the right to own semi-automatic firearms, such as those used in the shooting.

On February 20, 2018, ThinkProgress asked over two dozen corporations offering discounts to NRA members whether they would continue their relationships with the NRA. Several companies terminated their agreements with the NRA, and their announcements went viral, along with hashtags such as #BoycottNRA, started by activists like Michael Skolnik. One of the first to respond to the boycott, First National Bank of Omaha, the largest privately held bank in the United States, announced that it will not renew its deal for the "official credit card of the NRA".

== Companies involved ==
=== Affinity marketing ===
One class of companies targeted generally offer or offered discounts or free trials to NRA members, often advertised on the NRA website, in what is often termed affinity marketing. Access to discounts is a benefit of paying NRA membership dues and the NRA promotes the opportunity to save hundreds of dollars more than the cost of membership.

==== Severed ties ====
Companies that have severed ties with the NRA as of February 24, 2018, span banks, airlines, car rental services, hotels, and software companies. They include:

- Avis Budget Group (Avis, Budget and Hertz)
- Allied Van Lines and North American Van Lines both owned by Sirva
- Best Western
- Delta Air Lines
- Enterprise Holdings (Enterprise, National and Alamo)
- First National Bank of Omaha
- Harland Clarke Direct Selling Solutions
- Paramount Rx
- Personify Corp
- Republic Bank & Trust Company
- Securian
- SimpliSafe
- Starkey Hearing Technologies
- Symantec
- Teladoc
- TrueCar
- United Airlines
- Wyndham Hotel Group (in 2012 after Sandy Hook) but reiterated it does not support the NRA

==== Retained ties ====
Several companies have been pressured to disaffiliate with the NRA, but have not, or have not issued statements indicating that they will.

- Bass Pro Shops and subsidiary Cabela's
- BlackRock, saying that it would speak with weapons manufacturers and distributors, but has not taken any further action yet.
- Clearent credit card processing
- Global Rescue
- HotelPlanner defended its relationship with the NRA
- Life Line Screening
- Lloyd's of London
- Long-Term Care Resources
- ManageUrID
- Medical Concierge Network
- MedFlight Freedom
- MidwayUSA, saying "no company in America is more dedicated to, and more supportive of, the goals of the National Rifle Association than MidwayUSA"
- ReliaStar
- NetSpend
- Omni Hotels
- Vinesse Wine Clubs, the official wine club of the NRA
- Wells Fargo

==== FedEx ====
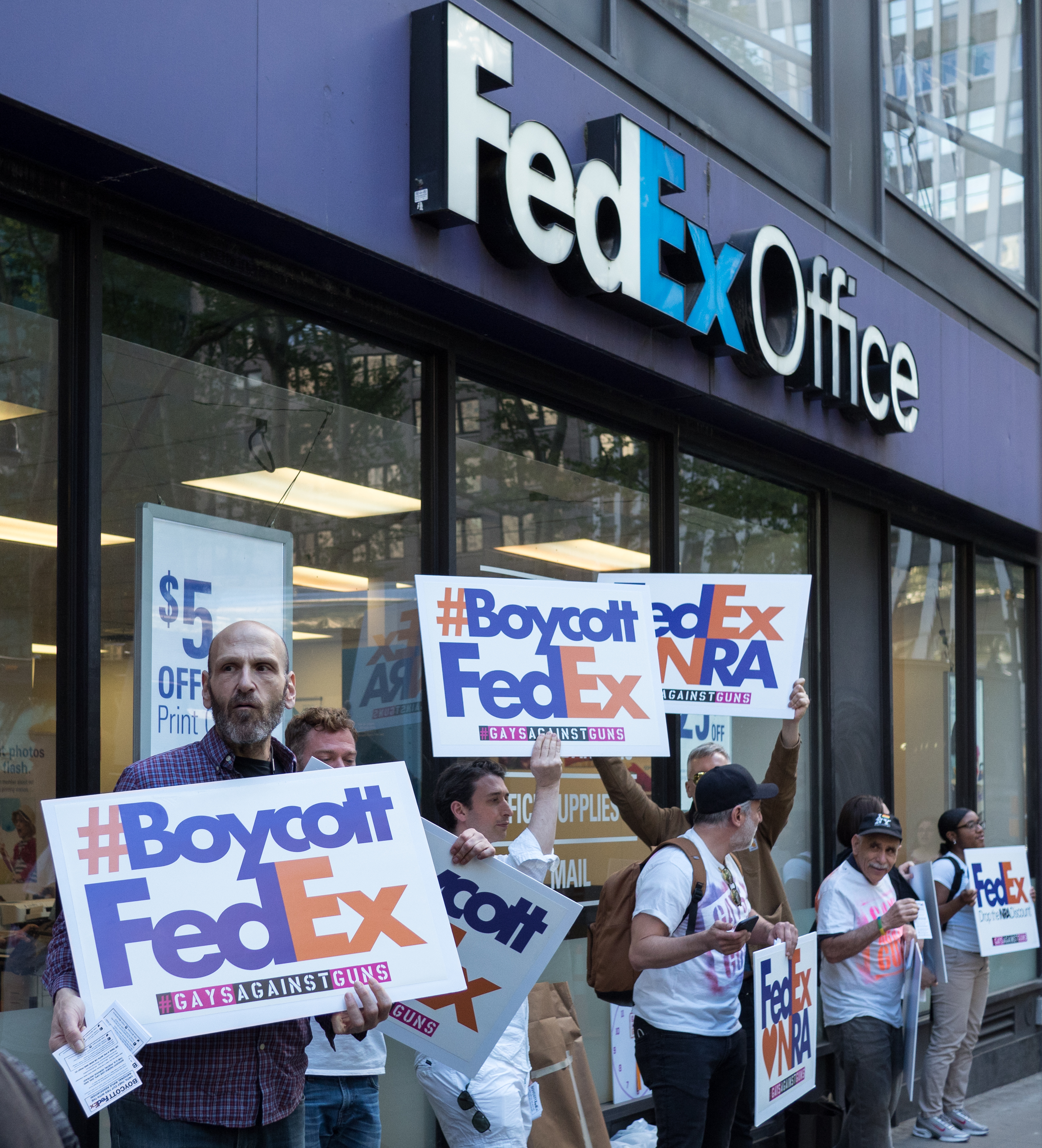
Protesters outside the FedEx Office in Midtown Manhattan

Pressure on FedEx to drop NRA discounts of up to 26 percent had been going on for nearly a year before the Florida shooting. After several companies cut ties with the NRA, calls to boycott FedEx arose on social media under the hashtag #BoycottFedEx. In a statement, FedEx affirmed that while it does not fully agree with the NRA on issues of gun policy, it will continue its business relationship with the organization. Due to a drop in NRA-related volume that made the organization ineligible for discounts, the NRA was dropped from the program on October 30, 2018.

=== Insurance providers ===
In response to the NRA boycott several companies discontinued insurance products targeted at NRA members.

- Lockton Companies announced it would no longer sell NRA endorsed policies.
- Chubb Limited ended its insurance product called NRA Carry Guard which covered gun owners who shot someone and claimed self-defence.
- MetLife ended discounts for NRA members.

=== Vista Outdoor ===
Vista Outdoor manufactures AR-15-style rifles under the Savage Arms brand and ammunition under the CCI and Federal brands as well as a range of bike related and other outdoor products including the Bell, Giro, CamelBak, and Blackburn brands. After the Parkland shooting, consumers called on retailers to stop selling all Vista Outdoor products specifically over the company's support of the NRA.

Bicycle retailers in several states stopped selling all Vista Outdoor products, citing the company's support for the NRA. Some cancelled orders or returned existing stock. Canadian retail cooperative Mountain Equipment Co-op similarly announced on March 1, 2018, that, in response to a petition by its members, it would no longer stock products by Vista Outdoor brands in its 22 stores. The co-op does not sell guns. In the United States Recreational Equipment, Inc. (REI) announced that they would stop ordering all Vista Outdoor products due to the company's NRA support. Running Room, Canada's largest dealer of athletic apparel announced it will discontinue Camelbak products across the chain of 120 Canadian and two US stores, citing strong customer support for the move.

=== Broadcasters of NRA programming ===
NRATV, the NRA's online video channel, is a prominent forum used by the organization to disseminate its message and with a large follower base on social media. In the aftermath of the events in Parkland, activists created the hashtags #stopNRAmazon and #DumpNRATV asking Amazon to discontinue streaming programs from NRATV, an initiative supported by celebrities like Alyssa Milano, Denis O'Hare, Evan Handler, Ben Gleib, Joshua Malina, Warren Leight, Genevieve Angelson, Joe Scarborough, Mika Brzezinski, and Misha Collins. Other companies offering NRATV programs as part of their streaming services became the target of a similar campaign launched by Moms Demand Action for Gun Sense and Everytown for Gun Safety.

The following companies continue to stream NRATV, despite petitions for them to stop:

- Amazon with Amazon Fire TV
- Apple Inc. with Apple TV
- Google with Chromecast
- Roku, Inc., which streams NRATV and NRA Women, stated it operates an open streaming service and that clients decide which channels they download.
- SiriusXM, which hosts an NRA radio show has also been pressured to cut ties.

=== Gun dealers ===
On February 28, 2018 Dick's Sporting Goods discontinued the sale of all assault-style rifles, high-capacity magazines and bump stocks. The company also immediately restricted the sale of any guns to customers aged 21 or older. As justification for the move, Dick's praised the Stoneman Douglas students who are campaigning for gun control and for businesses to side against the NRA.

== Publix ==
National grocery retailer Publix suspended all political donations after Stoneman Douglas survivor David Hogg organized a "die in" and a public boycott to protest the company's support of Adam Putnam, an NRA-backed candidate for Florida governor. The NRA had labeled Putnam with its highest endorsement and Putnam called himself on Twitter a "proud NRA sellout". Hogg stated "Anyone who supports an NRA sellout is an NRA sellout," as the reason for the action. Prior to the in store protests Hogg called on Publix to donate $1 million to the Stoneman Douglas Victims fund.

== Response ==
In a statement released February 24, 2018, the NRA accused the companies involved in the boycott of "a shameful display of political and civic cowardice" and added, "Let it be absolutely clear. The loss of a discount will neither scare nor distract one single NRA member from our mission to stand and defend the individual freedoms that have always made America the greatest nation in the world."

Following the NRA's response, conservative commentators and gun rights supporters voiced opposition to the boycott, calling it "mob justice" and accusing supporters of silencing free speech. Tim Hentschel of HotelPlanner.com said he would not mix business and politics, and that his decision to maintain the company's relationship with the NRA was not based on money.

Republicans in the Georgia state Senate voted to remove $50 million in jet fuel tax sale exemptions from a tax bill in response to Delta Air Lines' decision to sever ties with the NRA. Republican Lieutenant Governor Casey Cagle tweeted "I will kill any tax legislation that benefits @Delta unless the company changes its position and fully reinstates its relationship with @NRA. Corporations cannot attack conservatives and expect us not to fight back." Delta CEO Ed Bastian responded, saying, "Our decision was not made for economic gain and our values are not for sale."

== See also ==
- 2018 United States gun violence protests
- Boycott of The Ingraham Angle
- Sleeping Giants
