= Easton Archery =

Archery equipment manufacturer

Jas. D. Easton, Inc.
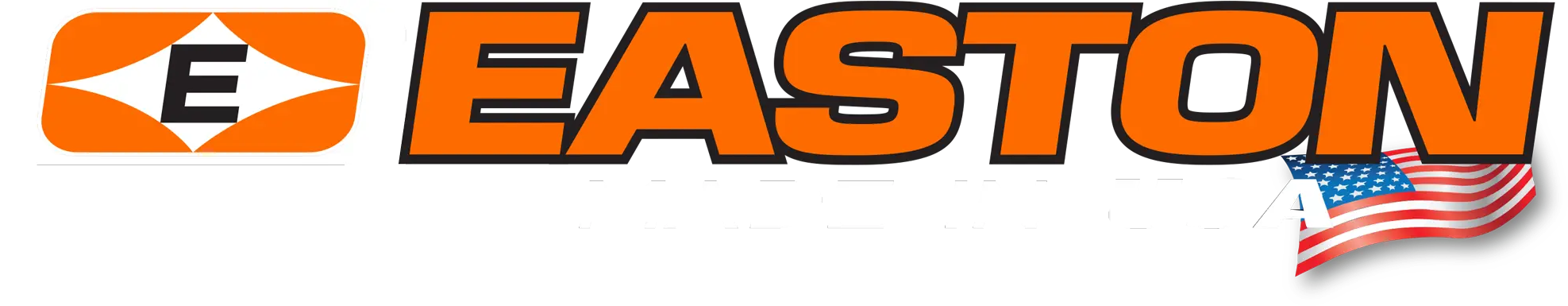
- Founded: September 18, 1953
- Founder: Doug Easton
- Headquarters: 5040 Harold Gatty Drive, Salt Lake City, Utah
- Products: Sporting Goods
- Number of employees: 1,000+
- Subsidiaries: Easton Sports (1985–2006)
- Website: eastonarchery.com

Jas. D. Easton, Inc., operating as Easton Archery, is an American archery equipment company that has existed since 1953. The company was started by James Douglas "Doug" Easton (1907–1972), who had made bows and arrows since 1922, and who in 1932 opened Easton's Archery Shop in Los Angeles. After the creation of the manufacturing company in 1953, Easton grew to become the world's leading archery business and pioneered the use of aluminum in sporting goods.

In 1960, Doug's son James L. Easton (1935–2023) joined the business. During the 1960s, the company branched out into ski poles and baseball bats, and in 1969 produced the thermal shroud for the seismometer used in the Apollo 11 moon landing. After Doug's death in 1972, Jim became president. In 1985, Easton formed a subsidiary company, Easton Sports, to engage in the team sports industry. Jas. D. Easton remained the owner of Easton Sports until 2006, when the latter was purchased by Fenway Partners for $400 million.

The independent, family owned archery division consists of two companies, Hoyt Archery, Inc. and Easton Technical Products, both located in Salt Lake City, Utah, USA. The two companies employ approximately 800 people in the manufacture of compound bows, recurve bows, and arrows. Easton arrows have been used to win every Olympic Games title in archery since the restoration of archery to the Olympic program in 1972. Easton Technical Products is also a supplier to the military, medical and outdoor sports industries for high-strength carbon fiber and aluminum alloy tubing. Hoyt and Easton are run as independent divisions of Jas. D. Easton, Inc. Greg Easton is the third generation President of Jas. D. Easton.

== History ==
In 1985, Jas. D. Easton acquired the Curley-Bates Co. and renamed it Easton Sports. The new company manufactured team sports equipment and grew to become a hockey and baseball company.

Easton Sports merged with Fenway Partners-owned Riddell Bell in 2006 to form Easton-Bell, later known as BRG Sports. Jim Easton was named chair of the company, which included the Riddell, Bell, and Giro brands. The archery business remained separate. All other Easton brands were divested by BRG in 2014.

- Easton Diamond (baseball and softball) is now owned by Rawlings.
- Easton Hockey is now owned by Peak Achievement Athletics, parent of Bauer Hockey.
- Easton Cycling is now owned by Fox Factory.
