= Fox Racing =

American action sports and clothing brand

Fox Head, Inc.

- Store located inside Southern Park Mall Boardman, Ohio.
- Trade name: Fox Racing
- Industry: Sporting goods
- Founded: 1974
- Headquarters: Irvine, California, U.S.
- Key people: Geoff Fox, Founder
- Products: Motocross and MTB gear, Clothing, Footwear, Eyewear, Bags, Stickers, Apparel, Helmets, Boots, Men's, Women's, Youth
- Owner: Revelyst
- Number of employees: 301
- Website: https://www.foxracing.com

Fox Head, Inc. (doing business as Fox Racing) is an American extreme sports (primarily motocross and mountain biking), protective equipment, and lifestyle-clothing brand founded in 1974. Fox is owned by Revelyst, having been previously owned by Vista Outdoor.

== History ==
The early histories of Fox Racing and Fox Racing Shox were intertwined. Fox Racing Shox is a brand of offroad-racing suspension components founded by Geoff Fox's brother, Bob Fox. Fox Racing Shox was originally owned by Moto-X Fox. In 1977 Bob's division split out as a separate company called Fox Factory.

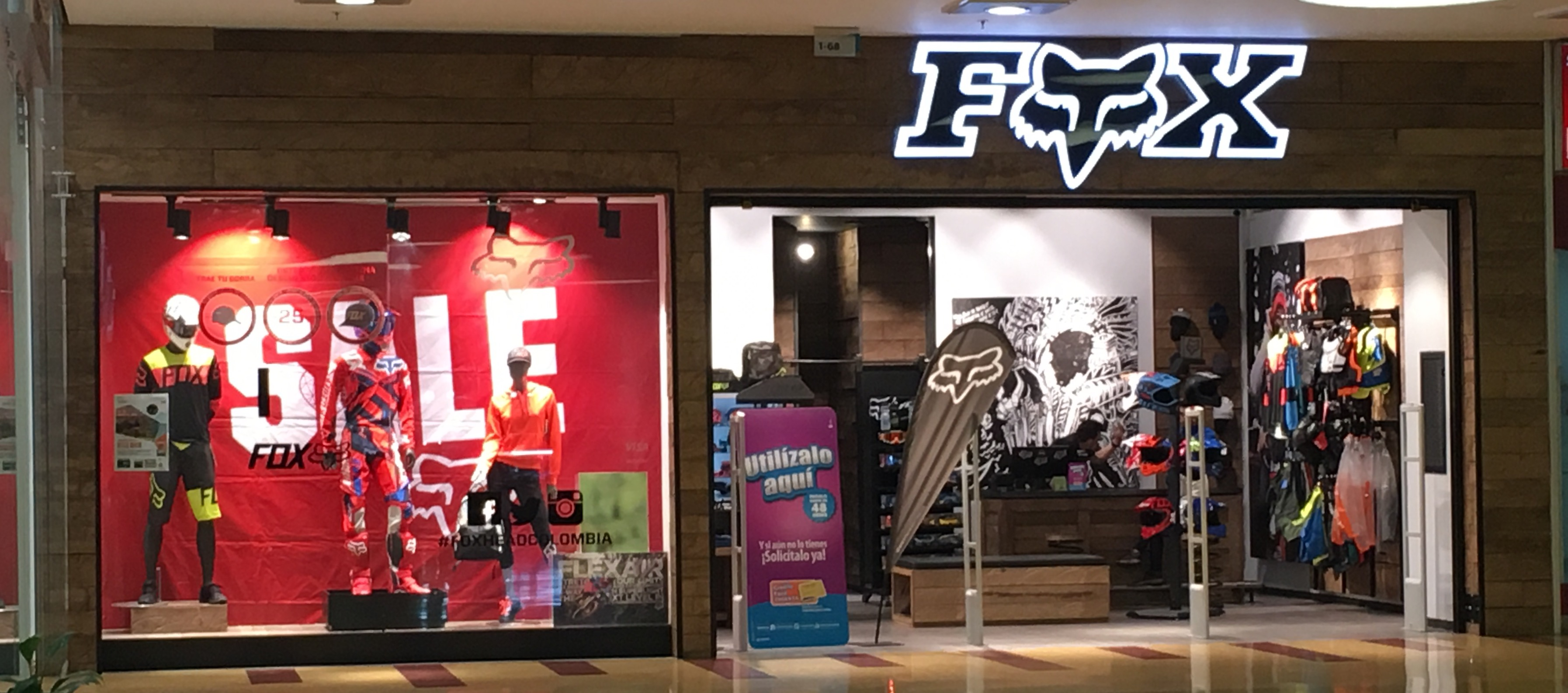
A Fox Head store at the Hayuelos Mall in Bogotá, Colombia

In July 2006, Fox Racing decided to change its corporate name to Fox Head. The move was complete by the fall of that year. Fox decided such a change would help the brand further penetrate sporting venues aside from motocross, such as mountain bike, wake boarding, surfing; as well as expand into other products.

Peter Fox was named CEO in 2008, with Greg Fox remaining on the board of directors. Peter Fox subsequently left the company, but rejoined when Fox Head was acquired by Altamont Capital Partners in 2014, leaving the founder and his son in charge of the company.

In July 2022, it was announced that Fox Racing would be acquired by Vista Outdoor for $540 million.

Fox Racing entered the shoe business in early 2022 with the introduction of Union shoe line designed for bicyclists.

In 2023, Vista Outdoor began to integrate brands such as Bell and Giro into the Action Sports division with Fox Racing.
