= Innovative Hockey =

American ice hockey company

- Founded: 1996
- Defunct: 2005
- Fate: Acquired by Warrior Sports
- Successor: Warrior Hockey
- Website: Archived official website at the Wayback Machine (archived 2003-12-26)

Innovative Hockey, Inc. was an American manufacturer of ice hockey sticks that operated from 1996 to 2005. The company was founded in California by Ronald H. Kunisaki and operated a factory in Tijuana, Mexico. Innovative pioneered the development of composite hockey stick shafts and one-piece sticks. Later, Innovative became notable for its association with the Detroit Red Wings, and around half the club's roster used Innovative sticks. In 2005, Innovative was purchased by the lacrosse company Warrior Sports and served as the foundation for Warrior's new hockey division.

== History ==
Innovative Hockey originated in Innovative Sports Technologies, Inc., founded in March 1990 by Kunisaki, Richard Carr, and Kirk S. Oshinomi. The original company designed and manufactured graphite golf club shafts. At a charity golf tournament, Los Angeles Kings player Dave Taylor met Kunisaki and suggested Innovative try making hockey stick shafts, and offered to test them. In 1996, Kunisaki started Innovative Hockey, Inc. and sold shafts. The first NHL player to use an Innovative stick was Alexei Kovalev, and shortly thereafter, Sergei Fedorov adopted the stick as well. Around 30 NHL players were using Innovative within a couple of years of operations.

In the late 1990s, Innovative struck a deal with Bauer to produce the company's composite hockey sticks under license. For the rest of the company's existence, the majority of its production was for Bauer, while Innovative sticks were a boutique product. At its peak, Innovative was producing approximately 10,000 sticks per month at its factory in Tijuana.

Innovative was especially notable for its association with the Detroit Red Wings, many of whom used Innovative in the late 1990s and early 2000s. From the club's 2002 Stanley Cup champion roster, Kirk Maltby, Brett Hull, Kris Draper, Luc Robitaille, Tomas Holmström, Darren McCarty, Igor Larionov, and Sergei Fedorov all used Innovative sticks. While Innovative was popular with professionals, the company lacked the marketing power of other brands that major sporting goods companies owned. Consequently, Innovative's products were never sold to the wider public.

In January 2005, Homayoun Ghassemi of Easton Sports arranged a meeting between Kunisaki and David Morrow, the president of Warrior, to discuss the potential sale of Innovative. In 2005, Kunisaki sold Innovative to Warrior Sports, a lacrosse company owned by New Balance. The Innovative operations served as the basis for the company's new hockey division, Warrior Hockey. After the sale, Kunisaki remained with the company as president of Warrior Hockey for three years. After leaving in 2008, in 2009 Kunisaki founded Base Hockey, a custom stick company, with former NHL player Cliff Ronning.
