= BRG Sports =

Sports equipment maker

BRG Sports, Inc.
- Formerly: Riddell Bell Holdings, Inc.(2004–2006); Easton-Bell Sports Inc. (2006–2014)
- Company type: Holding company
- Industry: Sports equipment
- Founded: 2004
- Headquarters: Van Nuys, Los Angeles, CA
- Owner: Fenway Partners
- Subsidiaries: Riddell Sports Group; Bell Sports (2004–2020); Easton Sports (2006–2014)
- Website: www.brgsports.com

BRG Sports, Inc. was an American holding company that owned and operated the Riddell Sports Group. BRG was founded in 2004 as Riddell Bell Holdings, Inc. by the private equity firm Fenway Partners, and served as the holding company for Fenway's two sports properties, Riddell Sports and Bell Sports. After Fenway acquired Easton Sports in 2006, the company's name was changed to Easton-Bell Sports, Inc.

In 2014, Easton-Bell sold Easton Sports to focus on its action sports companies, Bell, Riddell, and Giro. At this time, the holding company's name was changed to BRG Sports. In 2016, BRG sold Bell (including its subsidiaries Giro, C-Preme, and Blackburn) to Vista Outdoor, leaving Riddell its sole remaining property.

== History ==
=== Current ===
- Riddell

=== Former ===
- Bell Sports and Giro are now owned by Vista Outdoor.
- Easton Diamond (baseball and softball) is now owned by Rawlings.
- Easton Hockey is now owned by Peak Achievement Athletics, parent of Bauer Hockey.
- Easton Cycling is now owned by Fox Factory.
