= Hoyt Ruckus =

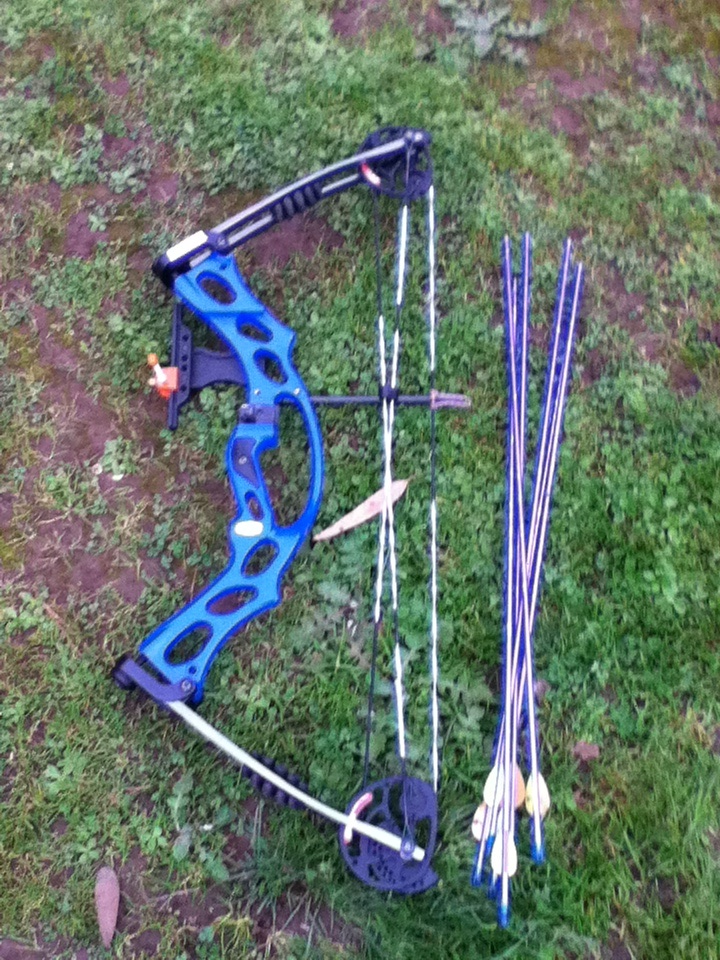
Hoyt Ruckus

The Hoyt Ruckus is a now-discontinued performance-driven youth compound bow produced by Hoyt Archery. It measures 29.75 in (75.6 cm) axel to axel. It has a huge range of adjustability with draw lengths going from 18–28 in (46–71 cm) at 1 in (2.5 cm) increments. This bow can be bought at 10–40 lb (4.5–18.1 kg) or 20–50 lb (9.1–22.7 kg) draw weight. The bow itself weighs 2.8 lb (1.3 kg). This bow can be used for hunting or target archery.

The max draw weight for this bow increases as the draw length gets longer e.g.: On the 20–50 lb (9.1–22.7 kg) model the maximum draw weight (50 lb (23 kg)) can only be reached at the maximum draw length (28 in (71 cm)) and the minimum draw weight (20 lb (9.1 kg)) can only be reached at the minimum draw length (18 in (46 cm)). Fully maxed out this bow can shoot up to 281 ft/s (86 m/s).

== Colours ==
The Hoyt Ruckus came in many colours including: Realtree AP, Blackout, Realtree Max 1, Realtree pink, half and half, Realtree snow, custom red, custom blue, custom black, pear white and pink.

== Successors ==
The most recent successor to the Ruckus is the Kobalt, introduced in 2022.
