= 2014–15 SPHL season =

- League: Southern Professional Hockey League
- Sport: Ice hockey
- Duration: October 24, 2014–April 18, 2015
- Number of games: 56
- Number of teams: 8

Regular season
- William B. Coffey Trophy: Peoria Rivermen
- Season MVP: Matt Gingera (Columbus)
- Top scorer: Adam Pawlick (Pensacola)

Playoffs
- Finals champions: Knoxville Ice Bears
- Finals runners-up: Mississippi RiverKings
- Playoffs MVP: Bryan Hince (Knoxville)

SPHL seasons
- ← 2013–14 2015–16 →

The 2014–15 SPHL season was the 11th season of the Southern Professional Hockey League (SPHL). The Knoxville Ice Bears defeated the Mississippi RiverKings in the President's Cup final 2 games to none to win their 4th SPHL title.

== Preseason ==
Following the 2013-14 season, the Bloomington Thunder announced that they would cease operations as a professional franchise to field a junior team in the United States Hockey League.

In May 2014, the Mississippi Surge announced that they would suspend operations for the 2014-15 season.

In June 2014, the league approved the move of the Augusta Riverhawks to Macon, Georgia, with the team being rebranded the Macon Mayhem. The Mayhem will sit out the 2014-15 season, and will begin league play in the 2015-16 season.

== Teams ==
2014-15 Southern Professional Hockey League
Team	City	Arena
Columbus Cottonmouths	Columbus, Georgia	Columbus Civic Center
Fayetteville FireAntz	Fayetteville, North Carolina	Crown Complex
Huntsville Havoc	Huntsville, Alabama	Von Braun Center
Knoxville Ice Bears	Knoxville, Tennessee	Knoxville Civic Coliseum
Louisiana IceGators	Lafayette, Louisiana	Cajundome
Mississippi RiverKings	Southaven, Mississippi	Landers Center
Pensacola Ice Flyers	Pensacola, Florida	Pensacola Bay Center
Peoria Rivermen	Peoria, Illinois	Carver Arena

== Map of teams ==
SPHL teams

== Regular season ==
The October 25, 2014 game between the Peoria Rivermen and the Huntsville Havoc was postponed after Huntsville player Justin Cseter fell onto Peoria's Dennis Sicard's skate, slashing his thigh early in the second period. The conclusion of the game was played on February 7, prior to a regularly scheduled game between the teams. Peoria won the completion of the October 25 game 3-1, but Huntsville won the regularly scheduled game also by the score of 3-1.

=== Standings ===
Team	GP	W	L	OTL	GF	GA	Pts
Peoria Rivermen^{‡}	56	36	17	3	186	149	75
Columbus Cottonmouths	56	33	19	4	182	161	70
Pensacola Ice Flyers	56	32	18	6	179	148	70
Mississippi RiverKings	56	33	21	2	169	140	68
Knoxville Ice Bears	56	31	22	3	159	166	65
Louisiana IceGators	56	27	21	8	177	184	62
Fayetteville FireAntz	56	21	27	8	143	193	50
Huntsville Havoc	56	11	38	7	130	184	29

^{‡} William B. Coffey Trophy winners
Advanced to playoffs

=== Attendance ===
Team	Total	Games	Average
Peoria	113,710	28	4,061
Pensacola	110,632	28	3,951
Huntsville	100,381	28	3,585
Knoxville	98,408	28	3,514
Fayetteville	85,122	28	3,040
Columbus	82,290	28	2,938
Mississippi	71,711	28	2,561
Louisiana	65,433	28	2,336
League	727,687	224	3,248

== President's Cup playoffs ==
=== Playoff bracket ===
Quarterfinals
1	Peoria Rivermen	1
6	Louisiana IceGators	2
2	Columbus Cottonmouths	1
5	Knoxville Ice Bears	2
3	Pensacola Ice Flyers	1
4	Mississippi RiverKings	2

Semifinals
5	Knoxville	2
6	Louisiana	1

Finals
4	Mississippi	0
5	Knoxville	2

=== Finals ===
The best of three series would have been played with the Riverkings as home team. However, prior contractual obligations with the Riverkings home ice forced the championship games to be played in Knoxville. All times are local (EDT)

April 16, 2015; 7:35pm	Knoxville	3 – 2 (1–0, 1–2, 1–0)	Mississippi	Knoxville Civic Coliseum; Knoxville, Tennessee; Attendance: 2,412

Game reference

Bryan Hince
Goalies
Peter Di Salvo
Referees:
Mike Sheehan
Jeremy Tufts
Linesmen:
Brent Hooks
Neil Campbell

Brett Valliquette (Nutkevitch, Paton) - 3:56	1 – 0
Dennis Sicard (Cousineau) - 7:35	2 – 0
	2 – 1	10:57 - pp - Leo Thomas (Whitehead, Randazzo)
	2 – 2	16:48 - pp - Bryon Paulazzo (Harrington, Sobotka)
Berkley Scott (Price, Salvis) - 4:54	3 – 2

6 min
Penalties
4 min
17
Shots
33

April 18, 2015; 7:35pm	Mississippi	2 – 4 (0–1, 1–2, 1–1)	Knoxville	Knoxville Civic Coliseum; Knoxville, Tennessee; Attendance: 4,671

Game reference

Peter Di Salvo
Goalies
Bryan Hince
Referees:
Mike Sheehan
Steve Thomson
Linesmen:
Brent Hooks
Neil Campbell

	0 – 1	2:04 - Eric Satim
	0 – 2	8:18 - Francis Drolet (Power, Satim)
Matt Whitehead (Sobotka) - 11:43	1 – 2
	1 – 3	15:12 - Eric Satim (Power, Drolet)
	1 – 4	18:39 - en - Matthew Paton
Mike Grace (Harrington) - 19:00	2 – 4

4 min
Penalties
8 min
38
Shots
18

== Awards ==
The SPHL All-Rookie team was announced on April 1, 2015, the All-SPHL teams on April 2, the Defensemen of the Year on April 3, the Rookie of the Year on April 6, the Goaltender of the Year on April 7, the Coach of the Year on April 8, and the Most Valuable Player on April 9.

2014–15 SPHL awards
Award	Recipient(s)	Finalists
President's Cup	Knoxville Ice Bears	Mississippi RiverKings
William B. Coffey Trophy (Best regular-season record)	Peoria Rivermen	
Easton Defenseman of the Year	Andrew Randazzo (Mississippi)	Louis Belisle (Columbus)
Easton Rookie of the Year	Bryce Williamson (Columbus)	Kevin Murdock (Fayetteville); Trevor Hertz (Fayetteville)
Sher-Wood Goaltender of the Year	Kyle Rank (Peoria)	Peter Di Salvo (Mississippi)
Easton Coach of the Year	Jean-Guy Trudel (Peoria)	Derek Landmesser (Mississippi)
Easton Most Valuable Player	Matt Gingera (Columbus)	Adam Pawlick (Pensacola)
Kevin Swider Leading Scorer Award	Adam Pawlick (Pensacola)	

=== All-SPHL selections ===
Position	First Team	Second Team	All-Rookie
G	Kyle Rank (Peoria)	Peter Di Salvo (Mississippi)	Kevin Murdock (Knoxville)
D	Louis Bélisle (Columbus)	Stuart Stefan (Huntsville)	Louis Bélisle (Columbus)
D	Andrew Randazzo (Mississippi)	Jan Safar (Fayetteville)	Robbie Donahoe (Knoxville)
F	Matt Whitehead (Mississippi)	Ryan Salvis (Knoxville)	Linden Bahm (Mississippi)
F	Adam Pawlick (Pensacola)	Corey Banfield (Pensacola)	Shawn Bates (Columbus)
F	Matt Gingera (Columbus)	Bryce Williamson (Columbus)	Bryce Williamson (Columbus)
