= 2015–16 SPHL season =

- League: Southern Professional Hockey League
- Sport: Ice hockey
- Duration: October 23, 2015–April 9, 2016
- Teams: 9

Regular Season
- William B. Coffey Trophy: Peoria Rivermen
- Season MVP: Garrett Bartus (Macon)
- Top scorer: Corey Banfield (Pensacola)

Playoffs
- Finals champions: Pensacola Ice Flyers
- Finals runners-up: Peoria Rivermen
- Playoffs MVP: Bryan Hince (Pensacola)

SPHL seasons
- ← 2014–15 2016–17 →

The 2015–16 SPHL season was the 12th season of the Southern Professional Hockey League (SPHL). The Pensacola Ice Flyers defeated the Peoria Rivermen in the President's Cup final 3 games to none to win their 3rd SPHL title in 4 years.

== Preseason ==
On May 4, 2015, the SPHL held an expansion draft in preparation for the Macon Mayhem to begin play as the league's 9th team.

== Teams ==
2015-16 Southern Professional Hockey League
Team	City	Arena
Columbus Cottonmouths	Columbus, Georgia	Columbus Civic Center
Fayetteville FireAntz	Fayetteville, North Carolina	Crown Complex
Huntsville Havoc	Huntsville, Alabama	Von Braun Center
Knoxville Ice Bears	Knoxville, Tennessee	Knoxville Civic Coliseum
Louisiana IceGators	Lafayette, Louisiana	Cajundome
Macon Mayhem	Macon, Georgia	Macon Coliseum
Mississippi RiverKings	Southaven, Mississippi	Landers Center
Pensacola Ice Flyers	Pensacola, Florida	Pensacola Bay Center
Peoria Rivermen	Peoria, Illinois	Carver Arena

== Map of teams ==
SPHL teams

== Regular season ==
=== Standings ===
Final standings

Team	GP	W	L	OTL	GF	GA	Pts
Peoria Rivermen‡	56	39	12	5	196	125	83
Pensacola Ice Flyers	56	31	20	5	175	157	67
Mississippi RiverKings	56	28	18	10	151	161	66
Fayetteville FireAntz	56	30	21	5	167	145	65
Knoxville Ice Bears	56	29	21	6	163	165	64
Louisiana IceGators	56	26	26	4	151	162	56
Huntsville Havoc	56	26	26	4	151	158	56
Macon Mayhem	56	24	27	5	138	157	53
Columbus Cottonmouths	56	19	29	8	124	186	46

^{‡} William B. Coffey Trophy winners
Advanced to playoffs

=== Attendance ===
Team	Total	Games	Average
Huntsville	117,298	28	4,187
Peoria	109,466	28	3,909
Pensacola	107,521	28	3,840
Knoxville	91,902	28	3,282
Fayetteville	78,460	28	2,802
Columbus	77,043	28	2,751
Mississippi	65,232	28	2,329
Louisiana	59,063	28	2,109
Macon	58,653	28	2,094
League	764,638	252	3,034

== President's Cup playoffs ==
=== Playoff bracket ===
Quarterfinals
1	Peoria Rivermen	2
8	Macon Mayhem	1
2	Pensacola Ice Flyers	2
7	Huntsville Havoc	0
(Pairings are reseeded after the first round)
3	Mississippi RiverKings	2
6	Louisiana IceGators	0
4	Fayetteville FireAntz	2
5	Knoxville Ice Bears	1

Semifinals
1	Peoria	2
4	Fayetteville	0
2	Pensacola	2
3	Mississippi	0

Championships
1	Peoria	0
2	Pensacola	3

=== Finals ===
Home team is listed first.

April 30	Peoria Rivermen	2–3	OT	Pensacola Ice Flyers	Carver Arena	Recap
No scoring		First period		2:29 – Brandon Zurn
Adam Stuart – 12:22		Second period		4:09 – Joe Caveney
Walker Wintoneak – 16:07		Third period		No scoring
No scoring		First overtime period		6:35 – Joseph Holka
Kyle Rank 32 shots / 29 saves		Goalie stats		Matt Zenzola 27 shots / 25 saves

May 1	Peoria Rivermen	2–3	Pensacola Ice Flyers	Carver Arena	Recap
Dave Pszenyczny – 10:11		First period	11:43 – Steve Bergin
No scoring		Second period	7:04 – Joe Caveney; 15:25 – Stephen Buco
Connor Toomey – PP 5:02		Third period	No scoring
Kyle Rank 19 shots / 16 saves David Jacobson 7 shots / 7 saves		Goalie stats	Matt Zenzola 23 shots / 21 saves

May 5	Pensacola Ice Flyers	5–4	Peoria Rivermen	Pensacola Bay Center	Recap
Adam Pawlick – 15:55; Brandon Zurn – 16:32		First period	13:41 – Connor Toomey
No scoring		Second period	1:51 – Chris Wilson
Joseph Holka – 1:19; Drew Baker – PP 9:47; Josh Cousineau – 19:59		Third period	8:51 PP – Mike Gurtler; 10:17 – Adam Stuart
Matt Zenzola 23 shots / 19 saves		Goalie stats	David Jacobson 34 shots / 29 saves

Pensacola wins series 3–0

== Awards ==
2015–16 SPHL awards
Award	Recipient(s)	Finalists
President's Cup	Pensacola Ice Flyers	Peoria Rivermen
William B. Coffey Trophy (Best regular-season record)	Peoria Rivermen	
Easton Defenseman of the Year	Brandon Greenside (Peoria)	Jason Price (Knoxville)
Easton Rookie of the Year	John Lidgett (Huntsville)	Joseph Manno (Fayetteville)
Goaltender of the Year	Garrett Bartus (Macon)	Kyle Rank (Peoria)
Easton Coach of the Year	Jean-Guy Trudel (Peoria)	Jeff Bes (Fayetteville); Rod Aldoff (Pensacola)
Easton Most Valuable Player	Garrett Bartus (Macon)	Corey Banfield (Pensacola)
Kevin Swider Leading Scorer Award	Corey Banfield (Pensacola)	

=== All-SPHL selections ===
Position	First Team	Second Team	All-Rookie
G	Garrett Bartus (Macon)	Kyle Rank (Peoria)	Brandon Jaeger (Columbus)
D	Brandon Greenside (Peoria)	Dave Pszenyczny (Peoria)	Corey Hale (Knoxville)
D	Jason Price (Knoxville)	Stuart Stefan (Huntsville)	Mike Krieg (Pensacola)
F	Corey Banfield (Pensacola)	Jake Hauswirth (Louisiana)	Zac Frischmon (Louisiana)
F	Kyle Gibbons (Fayetteville)	Josh McQuade (Fayetteville)	John Lidgett (Huntsville)
F	Adam Pawlick (Pensacola)	Shawn Skelly (Macon)	Joseph Manno (Fayetteville)
