= David Morrow (sports) =

Lacrosse player

Personal information
- Nationality: American

Sport
- Position: Defenseman
- Pro career: 1990–

Career highlights
- Awards: Lt. Raymond Enners Award (1993); Schmeisser Award (1992, 1993); Honors: All-American (first team: 1992, 1993; third team: 1991); NCAA Men's Lacrosse Silver Anniversary Team (1995); 1998 World Lacrosse Championship All-World Team
Medal record
Representing United States
Lacrosse
World Lacrosse Championship
Gold medal – first place	1994 Manchester	Field lacrosse
Gold medal – first place	1998 Baltimore	Field lacrosse

David K. Morrow is an American entrepreneur, businessman, and former lacrosse defenseman. He starred as a member of the Princeton Tigers men's lacrosse team from 1990 through 1993. He was a three-time United States Intercollegiate Lacrosse Association (USILA) All-American (two-time first team). He is a co-founder of Major League Lacrosse (MLL) and an innovator of the titanium lacrosse stick and hockey stick.

He is the most recent defenseman to earn the NCAA Lacrosse player of the year award and a two-time NCAA Lacrosse defenseman of the year. He was a three-time first team All-Ivy League selection. In his four-year college career, Princeton won the school's first NCAA tournament Championship, two Ivy League Championships and earned the school's first four NCAA Men's Lacrosse Championship tournament invitations. Following college, he represented Team USA in the 1994 and 1998 World Lacrosse Championships and was named to the 1998 All-World Team.

His equipment company, Warrior Sports, is a leading equipment provider to professional, collegiate and interscholastic teams and players. It provides a variety of equipment and has propagated the interest in titanium material for use in lacrosse and ice hockey equipment. He has expanded professional lacrosse from box lacrosse to field lacrosse by co-founding the MLL.

== Background ==
Morrow was raised in Troy, Michigan, a suburb of Detroit, where his father operated a tubing shop. He was a defenseman in both lacrosse and hockey. He attended Brother Rice High School in the nearby Bloomfield Township in Oakland County.

== College career ==
In his first year at Princeton, he nearly quit the lacrosse team when he realized that, because of his background, he was behind the other players in his understanding of the game. He felt he might be better off focusing on ice hockey. Princeton head coach Bill Tierney convinced him to use his speed to run with the offensive players and to keep his stick in front of them, which encouraged him to adapt his natural speed to the sport. He earned his first start as a sophomore in 1991.

In one season, Morrow broke or bent 25 aluminum lacrosse sticks. After tinkering with the lacrosse stick design at his father's shop, Morrow introduced a titanium version of the stick in the 1992 NCAA Division I Men's Lacrosse Championship tournament. Morrow scored two goals in the 16–14 semifinals victory over North Carolina in the first game using the titanium stick. Princeton went on to win the tournament, its first NCAA national championship. During the 1993 NCAA Division I Men's Lacrosse Championship tournament, Morrow shut down Loyola's Kevin Beach, who had 6 goals in the first round game. He was selected to the All-tournament team that year. During his four years, Princeton earned its first four berths in the NCAA Men's Lacrosse Championship. The 1992 and 1993 teams were undefeated 6–0 outright Ivy League champions.

Morrow was a first team USILA All-American Team selection in 1992 and 1993 and a third team selection in 1991. He was a three-time first team All-Ivy League selection (1991, 1992 and 1993). Morrow is one of only two and the most recent defenseman to earn the Lt. Raymond Enners Award as the NCAA Lacrosse player of the year award. He twice earned the Schmeisser Award (1992, 1993) as the NCAA Lacrosse defenseman of the year. Morrow was selected to the NCAA Lacrosse Silver Anniversary team in 1995. Morrow was drafted by the Philadelphia Wings during the 1994 National Lacrosse League Entry Draft. He won gold medals at the 1994 and 1998 World Lacrosse Championships and was named to the 1998 World Lacrosse Championship All-World team.

== Professional career ==
Three Warrior lacrosse stick shafts.

In 1991, one of his father's customers was attempting to modernize the snowshoe with experimental materials such as titanium. At the time, lacrosse sticks were made of aluminum that could get bent during the game. Morrow was breaking and bending sticks at a rapid rate. Morrow noticed titanium was lighter and more durable than aluminum. Thus, at his father's suggestion, he incorporated it into the lacrosse stick the following year. A year later, he began his own business, selling his first sticks in February 1993. In 1993, he was affiliated with the Philadelphia Wings but became a free agent. Morrow was selected for Team USA that would compete at the 1994 World Lacrosse Championship. After being named to the 1998 All World team following the 1998 World Lacrosse Championship, he retired from competitive lacrosse to focus on the business.

Today, lacrosse sticks by all manufacturers use titanium, and players at all levels use titanium sticks. Morrow's idea led to his own business venture, Warrior Lacrosse, which is named after the Brother Rice High School Warriors whom he played for in high school. Morrow sold controlling interest of his company to New Balance in January 2004 but continues to be the President and CEO of Warrior Sports. As of 2001, Warrior and its 50 employees were the official equipment supplier of the U.S. Men's National Teams program and the MLL. As of 2007, Warrior Sports held a 40% market share in the lacrosse industry. The company had several divisions including Warrior Lacrosse, Brine Sports, and Warrior Sports Canada. In 2005 Warrior sports acquired Innovative Hockey and As of 2007, it had 600 employees and over 150 National Hockey League players using their composite hockey sticks. Warrior sports sponsors over 200 youth programs, tournaments, and camps each year. It also sponsors professional and intercollegiate teams. In addition, the company puts on clinics and demonstrations around the world.

Morrow founded MLL along with Jake Steinfeld. He originally served on the prospective league's advisory committee. In 2001, Morrow's newly opened six-team MLL opened as a professional field lacrosse complement to the box lacrosse National Lacrosse League. It opened on June 7 at Homewood Field in Baltimore near the National Lacrosse Hall of Fame. The league has been successful and has been televised on ESPN2 since 2003. It is under contract to be televised on the network until 2016. In 2018, he was inducted into the National Lacrosse Hall of Fame.

== Personal ==
As of March 2007, he and his wife Christine, who is also a Princeton alumna, had three children: Samantha, Kevin and Jessica. Christine Schluter, a member of Princeton's Class of 1992, was a geochemist in Boulder, Colorado when she moved to Detroit to work for Morrow.

== Notes ==
Preceded by Darren Lowe	Lt. Raymond Enners Award; 1993	Succeeded by Scott Bacigalupo
Preceded by Brian Burlace	Schmeisser Award; 1992, 1993	Succeeded by Reid Jackson
