= All Aboard America! =

Large U.S. motorcoach fleet operator

- Formerly: Industrial Bus Lines; Potash Mines Transportation Company
- Parent: All Aboard America! Holdings, Inc. (2012-present)
- Founded: 1936; 90 years ago
- Headquarters: Mesa, Arizona
- Alliance: Greyhound Lines (Presidio line)
- Website: www.allaboardamerica.com

All Aboard America! Holdings, Inc.
- Type: Holding company
- Founded: 2012; 14 years ago
- Founder: Celerity Partners
- Headquarters: Lakewood, Colorado, Jefferson County, Colorado, United States
- Owner: Celerity Partners (2012–16); Tensile Capital Mgmt. (2016–23); Kelsian Group (2023–present)
- Website: aaahinc.com

All Aboard America! is an American bus company that operates charters, tours, casino and cruise shuttles, and scheduled routes. Part of All Aboard America! Holdings, Inc. (AAAHI), it is the fourth-largest motorcoach operator in the United States.

On June 2, 2023, Kelsian Group completed the acquisition of AAAHI for $325 million.

== History ==
Founded in 1936 by Henry Page, the transportation service provider was initially known as Potash Mines Transportation Co. and served to transport potash miners in Southeast New Mexico. Later, the business expanded to Texas and the Southwest when Industrial Bus Lines, Inc. was created by Henry's daughter, Caradene, and her husband, Jack Wigley.

In 1971, IBL had its name used by the operator created from its merger with PMTC; however, the company became known as All Aboard America! in 1989. After remaining independent until 2012, it was acquired by the private equity firm Celerity Partners and integrated into a new holding company (AAAHI) that brought together two other transport service providers.

In 2015, one year after purchasing Sun Diego Charter of San Diego, AAAHI announced it had acquired the paratransit operator for Denver's Regional Transportation District. Around this time, it also purchased the Denver operations of Horizon Coach Lines, which was renamed Ace Express Coaches.

After being purchased by Tensile Capital Management in 2016, All Aboard America! Holdings, Inc. made two acquisitions: the California company Lux Bus America (2018) and First Class Transportation, a Texas carrier (2020). In June 2023, it was acquired by Australia-based Kelsian Group.

== Scheduled services ==
All Aboard America! Holdings operates the following scheduled services:

- All Aboard America!
  - Midland/Odessa, Texas to Presidio, Texas
  - NMDOT Park and Ride (under contract to New Mexico Department of Transportation)
  - Rio Metro buses, mainly those in Sandoval County (under contract to Rio Metro Regional Transportation District)
- Ace Express Coaches
  - Bustang (under contract to the Colorado Department of Transportation)

== See also ==
- Intercity buses in the United States
