= Warrior Sports =

American sporting goods manufacturer

Warrior Sports, Inc.
- Formerly: Warrior Lacrosse
- Type: Subsidiary
- Industry: Sports equipment
- Founded: June 1, 1992; 34 years ago
- Founder: David Morrow
- Headquarters: Warren, Michigan, United States
- Area served: North America, Europe, Asia
- Key people: Cindy Abbott (CEO)
- Products: Ice hockey equipment: sticks, helmets, gloves, goalie masks; Lacrosse: sticks, helmet, gloves, goalie masks
- Parent: New Balance
- Website: warrior.com

Warrior Sports, Inc. is an American sports equipment manufacturer based in Warren, Michigan. The company currently focuses on ice hockey and lacrosse, producing ice hockey skates, sticks, helmets, gloves, goalie masks, and protective gear for both sports.

Warrior entered the soccer market in 2012, producing kits and training equipment for several clubs around the world, although the soccer sponsorship and products were later discontinued with its parent company New Balance's entry into the category.

== History ==
Warrior Sports was founded in 1992 by David Morrow, a former lacrosse player. The company name is derived from Morrow's roots as a member of the Brother Rice Warriors lacrosse team in Birmingham, Michigan. The company started out as the first manufacturer of titanium lacrosse shafts, which changed the game due to their strength and light weight. Morrow went on to highlight the breakthrough shaft as he played for the Princeton Tigers lacrosse team. He also went on to be the NCAA player of the year.

In 2004, the privately held company, New Balance Athletic Shoe, Inc. obtained controlling interest in Warrior. One year later, Warrior moved into the ice hockey industry when it acquired California–based manufacturer Innovative Hockey. In 2007, Warrior acquired the Boston-based Brine Sporting Goods to further establish their market share in lacrosse. In July 2026, Warrior entered the ice skate market with their Alpha Pro skate.

== Sponsorships ==
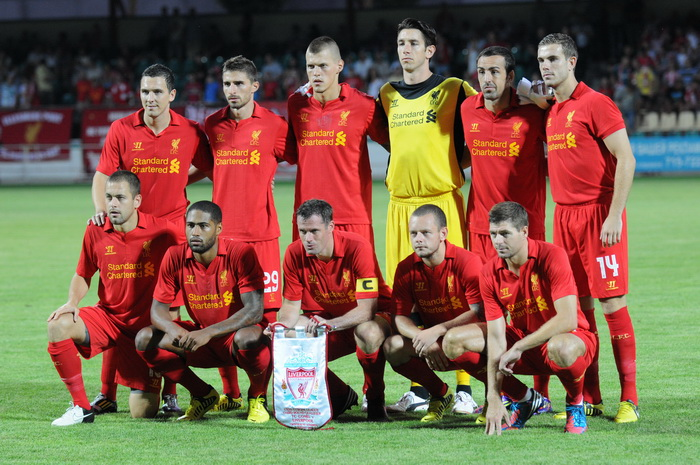
Liverpool's first-team wearing the 2012–13 season home kit made by Warrior

In April 2011, Warrior Sports reportedly signed a sponsorship agreement for Liverpool worth £25 million per season as of the 2012–13 season while Carlsberg reduced their annual sponsorship to just half of that, overtaking the English club record of £23.3 million paid by Nike for supplying Manchester United and the previous deal from Adidas worth £13 million.

On January 18, 2012, Liverpool and Warrior Sports announced a deal between the two organisations, whereby Warrior became the Liverpool kit sponsor effective from June 1, 2012. The new Liverpool home kits were launched on the official Liverpool website on May 11, 2012, and were notable for their classic design and a return to a more simplified club badge. The design was welcomed by most fans but has angered some. This is due to the new kit moving the traditional commemorative symbol for the Hillsborough disaster from the front to the back of the kit.

On June 5, 2013, the new Liverpool away kit was launched for the 2013–14 season. Described as "possibly one of the worst football kits of all time", its reception was overwhelmingly negative, both in the press and from the fans, who quickly took to social media to express their dislike of it.

In February 2015, parent company New Balance announced it was entering the global soccer market. As part of the move, all clubs and players sponsored by Warrior would be outfitted by New Balance while Warrior would go back to just hockey and lacrosse going forward.

The practice facility of the Boston Bruins of the National Hockey League and the home arena of the Boston Pride of the National Women's Hockey League is named Warrior Ice Arena. The arena, part of a larger project called Boston Landing is owned by Warrior's parent company New Balance.

== Controversy ==
Beginning in July 2012, Warrior Lacrosse embroiled itself in controversy by launching a Twitter marketing campaign for which users were entered into a raffle to win a free pair of shoes if they used the hashtag #ninjaplease. The campaign has been widely derided throughout the industry and in the lacrosse world. As Warrior was a founding factor in Major League Lacrosse (MLL) and sponsors all teams, some African-American players in the league have protested, with the possibility of retiring from the league should the controversy not be handled appropriately. Warrior suspended the campaign and the MLL removed all references to it on October 29, 2012, when the meaning of the hashtag used in the campaign came to the attention of officials of both organizations.
