= Vista Outdoor =

American manufacturing company

Vista Outdoor Inc.
- Traded as: NYSE: VSTO
- Industry: Shooting sports and outdoor products
- Predecessor: Alliant Techsystems
- Founded: February 2015; 11 years ago
- Defunct: 2025; 1 year ago
- Fate: Split into Revelyst and Kinetic Group
- Headquarters: Anoka, Minnesota, United States
- Products: Sports goods
- Revenue: ▼US$2.059 billion (2019) ▼US$2.308 billion (2018)
- Number of employees: 5,800

Vista Outdoor Inc. was an American designer, manufacturer, and marketer that operated in two segments: shooting sports and outdoor products. It was a "house of brands" with more than 40 labels and subsidiaries.

Vista Outdoor was the parent company to many ammunition makers, including Federal, CCI, and Remington.

In November 2024, Vista Outdoor separated its outdoor products business into an independent, publicly traded company, Revelyst, and the shooting products business, named The Kinetic Group, was acquired by Czechoslovak Group. Revelyst was subsequently acquired by Strategic Value Partners in January 2025.

== History ==
Alliant Techsystems (ATK), entered the ammunition and outdoor products business in 2001. ATK grew through acquisitions and a large increase in demand for ammunition for police, hunting, and other private uses.

ATK told its regulators in December 2014 that it intended first to merge its defense and satellite businesses with Orbital Sciences, and then spin off its sporting goods and ammunition business as a stand-alone public company to be named Vista Outdoor. Vista Outdoor signed an agreement for a $350 million secured loan with a term of five years and a $400 million revolving line of credit. Proceeds were partially used to pay down debt. ATK and Orbital Sciences filed a joint proxy statement and prospectus describing the share issuance with the Securities and Exchange Commission on December 17, 2014. The same month, the Department of Justice approved to the merger and spinoff.

ATK spun-off Vista Outdoor after merging with Orbital Sciences and became Orbital ATK on February 9, 2015. Anyone holding ATK common stock at the end of the business day on February 2, 2015, received two shares of Vista Outdoor common stock. Eligible shareholders had their brokerage account credited or received a book-entry account statement reflecting their ownership. Vista Outdoor was thus initially 100% owned by ATK shareholders. Vista Outdoor stock traded on a "when-issued" basis from January 29, 2015, to February 9, 2015. It began "regular way" trading on the New York Stock Exchange on February 10, 2015, under the ticker symbol "VSTO." Shareholders were not required to make any payment or take action of any kind. This transaction was conducted on a tax-free basis. U.S. shareholders generally did not have to recognize a gain or loss for federal tax purposes.

On February 25, 2016, BRG Sports announced its acceptance of a $400-million cash and earn-out deal to sell its "Action Sports" business to Vista Outdoor. Vista gained control of the Bell Sports, Giro, Blackburn, and C-Preme brands.

On May 1, 2018, Vista Outdoor announced that it would consider selling its gun manufacturing subsidiaries and Bell, Giro, Blackburn, and Jimmy Styks, to focus on its core brands for outdoors enthusiasts. Months earlier, Vista announced that it was attempting to sell eyewear brands Bolle, Serengeti, and Cebe. The company said its move out of the firearms business had nothing to do with recent boycotts. CEO Christopher Metz said the move had been planned in advance and that Savage Arms and Stevens would require too much investment to rectify their lack of handguns, which make up half the gun market in the US. Metz said he expects the asset sales to be completed by the 2020 fiscal year. Metz said the company would focus heavily on what it called its "heritage ammunition business."

Vista Outdoor announced on July 9, 2018, that it had reached an agreement with a European private equity fund to sell the Bollé, Cébé and Serengeti eyewear brands.

On July 9, 2019, Vista Outdoor completed the sale of Savage Arms and Stevens Arms for $170 million to a group of investors led by Savage's management. Vista received immediate gross proceeds of $158 million and a $12-million five-year note. Vista said it will use this money, after paying associated taxes, to reduce its debt.

On October 13, 2020, Vista Outdoor acquired certain assets related to Remington Outdoor Company's ammunition and accessories businesses, including Remington's Lonoke, Arkansas, manufacturing facility and the Remington brand and trademarks, for $81.4 million. Vista Outdoor used a combination of approximately $51 million of cash on hand and approximately $30 million from its asset-based revolving credit facility to complete this transaction.

In July 2022, Vista Outdoor announced that it would be acquiring Fox Racing for $540 million. The acquisition is expected to close in the second quarter of 2023. Later, Vista Outdoor also announced its intent to split into different companies with new names and stock symbol; One company will focus on sporting goods while the other will focus on ammunition and firearms accessories.

After the resignation of Chris Metz in early 2023, Vista Outdoor board member Gary McArthur was named interim CEO.

In October 2023, the company announced that it would spin off its outdoor products segment into a separate publicly traded company called Revelyst and its firearms and ammunition business will be sold off to Czech company Czechoslovak Group for a value of $1.91 billion, pending regulatory approval. Vista's sale to CSG has been protested by senators JD Vance, John Kennedy, representative Clay Higgins and National Sheriffs' Association.

In November 2024, Vista Outdoor completed the separation of its outdoor products business into an independent, publicly traded company, Revelyst (NYSE: GEAR), and the shooting products business, known as The Kinetic Group, became a wholly owned subsidiary of Czechoslovak Group for the price of $2.23bn.

In January 2025, Revelyst was acquired by Strategic Value Partners, LLC in an all-cash transaction based on an enterprise value of $1.125 billion.

=== Financial results ===
On January 11, 2017, Vista Outdoor disclosed that it expected to record "a material asset impairment charge in its hunting and shooting accessories reporting unit" for the third quarter of its fiscal year 2017. Vista reported that "the Company's preliminary analysis indicates the impairment charge will be in the range of $400 million to $450 million."

For fiscal year 2019, Vista Outdoor had sales of $2.1 billion. It lost $648 million. Vista reduced its debt load from $738 million to $581 million due to its sale of Savage Arms.

=== Response to the 2022 invasion of Ukraine ===
Responding to Ukrainian President Volodymyr Zelenskyy's call for ammunition after Russia invaded Ukraine, Vista Outdoor, supplier of ammunition to Ukraine's military since 2015, pledged to donate 1 million rounds of small-caliber ammunition to the country's armed forces. Vista's ammunition companies Federal and Remington also started selling T-shirts on their websites to raise money for Ukrainian refugees.

== Brands and subsidiaries ==
Many of Vista's brands are associated with shooting and hunting. The company also makes gear for camping, hiking, skiing, and biking such as flashlights, headlamps, lanterns, helmets, goggles, GPS locators, etc. As of 2019, Vista Outdoor earned about 50% of its profits from businesses units related to shooting sports, such as ammunition makers Federal Premium and CCI.

=== Bushnell ===
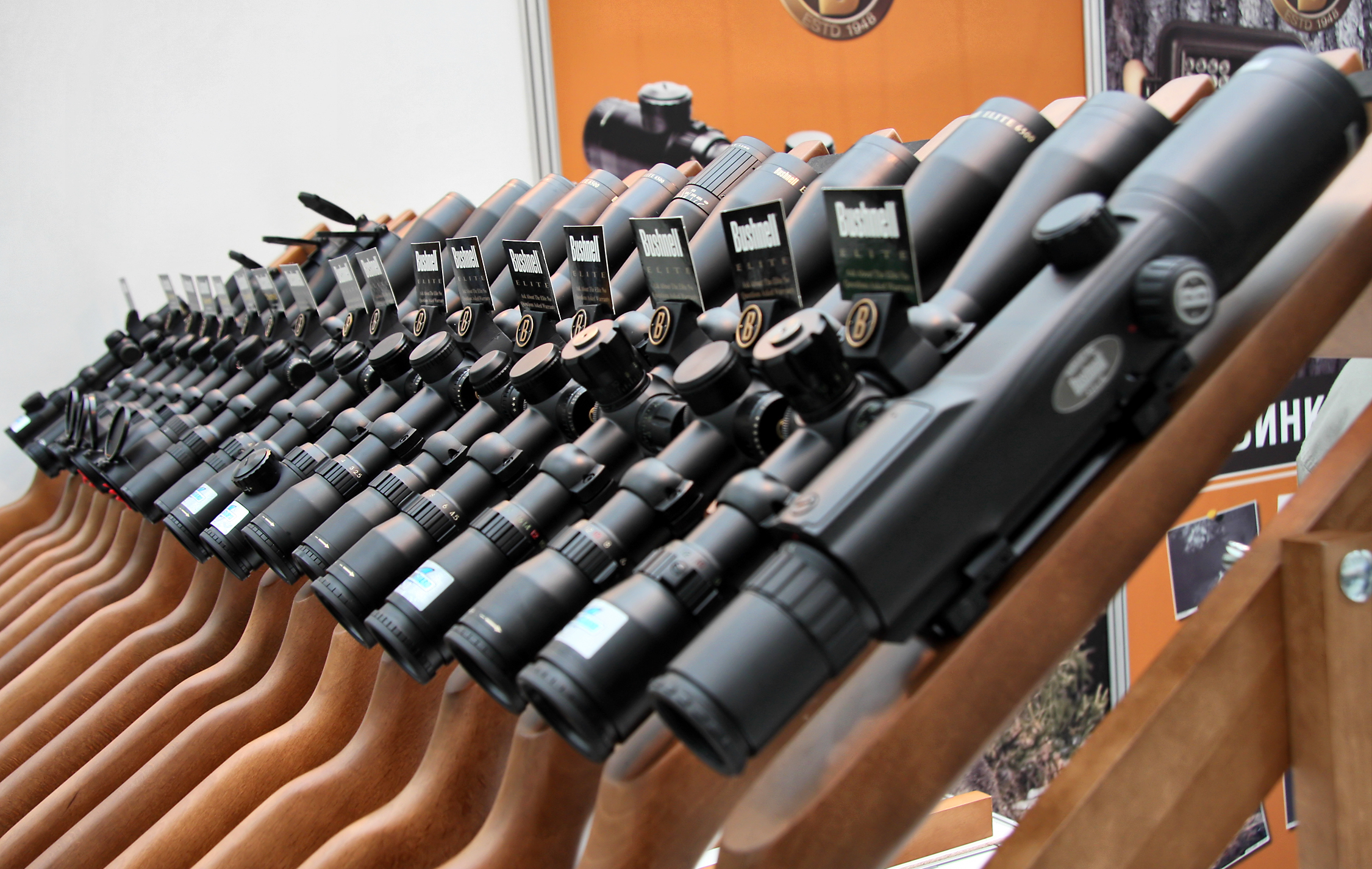
Bushnell scopes on display at a hunting exhibition

Also known as Bushnell Outdoor Products, Bushnell specializes in optics. Its products include binoculars, spotting scopes, telescopes, night vision equipment, GPS devices, laser rangefinders, riflescopes, holographic weapon sights, game cameras, and other high-end optical equipment.

David P. Bushnell founded Bushnell Corporation in 1948 during his service in Allied-occupied Japan. In 1999, private equity firm Windpoint Partners acquired Bushnell. In 2007, Bushnell was acquired by MidOcean Partners, another private equity firm, in a leveraged buyout. In 2008, Bushnell acquired the assets of Simmons Outdoor Corporation from Meade Instruments. ATK announced its acquisition of Bushnell on September 5, 2013, for $985 million in cash, subject to post-closing adjustments.

=== CCI ===
Cascade Cartridge, usually called CCI Ammunition, is based in Lewiston, Idaho. Initially, CCI made centerfire primers for government use. As of March 2015, it mainly manufactures rimfire ammunition but also makes centerfire handgun ammunition, primers for reloading and industrial purposes, and shotgun shells.

CCI was founded in 1951 by Dick Speer, brother of Speer Bullets founder Vernon Speer. CCI was previously known as the Speer Ammunition Company.

=== Federal Premium ===
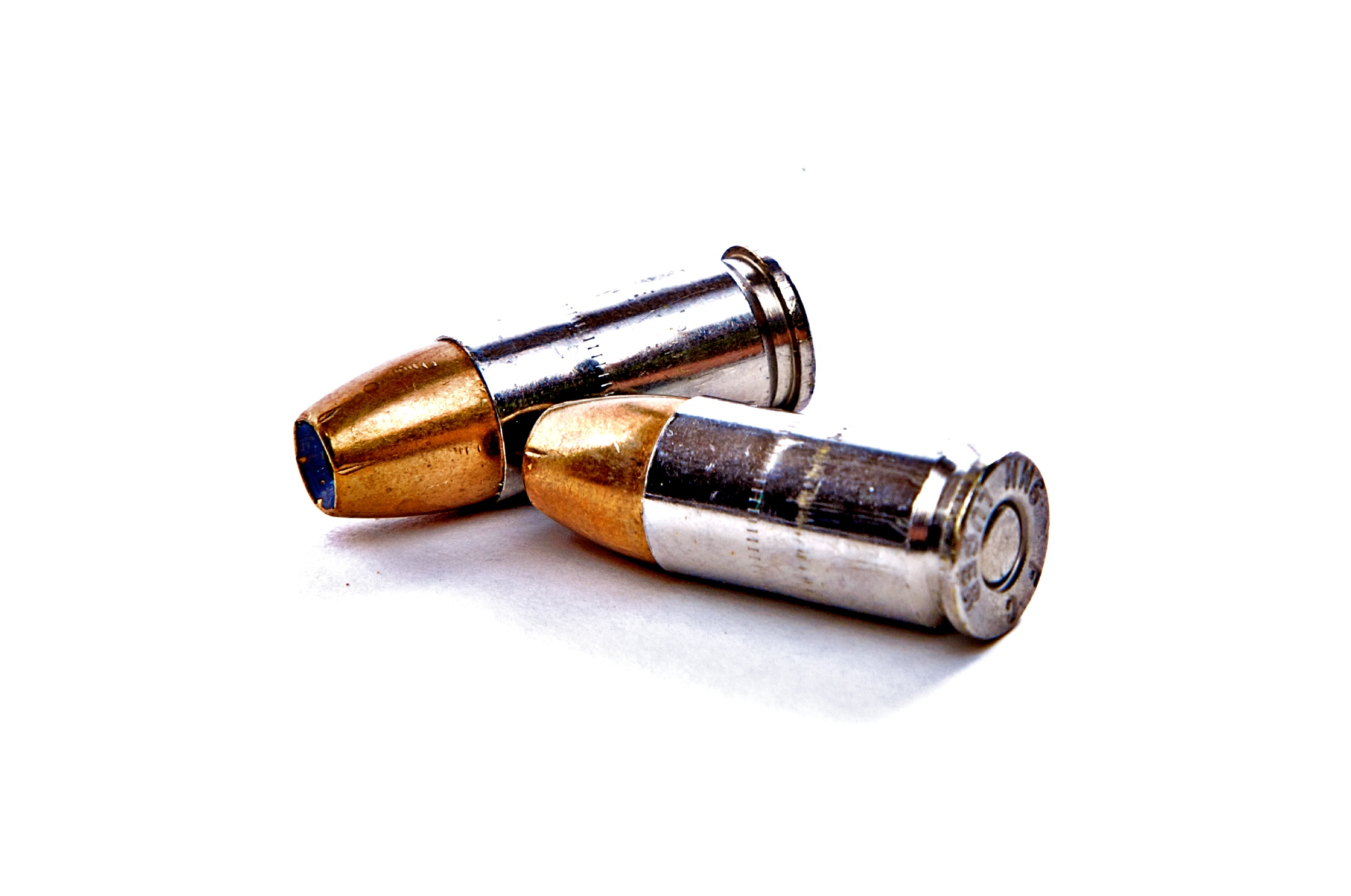
Hydra-Shok 9mm ammunition from Federal Premium

Federal Cartridge, usually styled Federal Premium, is located in Anoka, Minnesota where it employs roughly 1,000 workers. It was founded in 1922 by Charles L. Horn. Federal Premium manufactures finished shotshell, centerfire, and rimfire ammunition, as well as bullets, primers, and shell casings. Federal Premium introduced its Hydra-Shok line of handgun ammunition in 1988 after the FBI requested a bullet with better terminal ballistics than traditional cup-and-core projectiles. Federal Premium manages Vista Outdoor's relationship with the Lake City Army Ammunition Plant.

=== Jimmy Styks ===
Kyle Reeves and Jeremy Wilkens founded Jimmy Styks in 2009 in Huntington Beach, California. In July 2015, Vista Outdoor announced its intent to purchase Jimmy Styks for $40 million upfront with additional payments to the founders, who are staying with the company, triggered by meeting financial targets over the next three years. Jimmy Styks makes stand-up paddleboards and accessories. Vista Outdoor will integrate Jimmy Styks into its outdoor products division. This purchase price was a multiple of about 5.5 times the expected 2015 calendar year EBITDA.

In January 2016, Vista Outdoor announced that it would use its relationships with retailers to expand the number of stores that offer Jimmy Styks products.

=== Alliant Powder ===
Vista Outdoor's Alliant Powder division makes smokeless gunpowder.

=== Remington Ammunition ===
Remington Ammunition was formed after Vista Outdoor acquired the Remington brand and ammunition facility in Lonoke, Arkansas, in the now defunct Remington Outdoor Company's bankruptcy auction. Notably, the firearm side of Remington Outdoor Company was not purchased by Vista Outdoor; much of it (excluding Marlin Firearms) was reorganized into RemArms, LLC. RemArms operates Remington Firearms, licensing use of the Remington brand name from Vista Outdoor.

After shutting down due to Remington's bankruptcy, the Lonoke ammunition plant was retooled in early 2021, ramping up production and running around-the-clock. The company doubled the number of workers at Lonoke, employing over 900 people.

=== Camp Chef ===
Vista Outdoor announced the acquisition of Camp Chef in September 2016. They offer various products including camp stoves, barbecue grills, pellet grills, smokers, fire pits. Vista Outdoor paid a purchase price of $74 million (excluding tax effects), with $60 million in cash paid at closing and $14 million in an earn-out. The effective multiple of the transaction was approximately 6.4x Camp Chef's expected calendar year 2016 EBITDA.

=== Foresight Sports ===
In May 2022, Vista Outdoor announced the acquisition of launch monitor and golf simulator manufacturer Foresight Sports. The acquisition valued at $475 million is aimed to aid Vista's Bushnell brand in expanding into new segments.

=== Fox Racing ===
In July 2022, Vista Outdoor bought Fox Racing for $540 million. This amount could be increased by $50 million through an earn-out. Fox Racing CEO Jeffrey McGuane will continue in his position following the merger. Fox Racing makes apparel and accessories for mountain biking, motocross, and BMX.

=== Simms Fishing Products ===
In July 2022, Vista Outdoor announced the acquisition of Simms Fishing Products for $192.5 million. Simms makes waders and other fishing equipment. Simms is based in Bozeman, Montana. In early 2023, Vista Outdoor appointed Derek Tarlecki President of Simms Fishing Products.

=== QuietKat ===
QuietKat is a manufacturer of electric bicycles. Vista Outdoor acquired QuietKat in May 2021. The company is famous for a Super Bowl advertisement featuring a Jeep-branded electric bike.

== Leadership ==
=== Christopher Metz ===
Metz was named CEO of Vista Outdoor on October 9, 2017. He is responsible for Vista Outdoor's and its subsidiaries' daily operations. Metz is also a managing partner at Kellwood Company. He served as the CEO and president of Arctic Cat from 2014 to 2017. Metz was the managing director of Sun Capital Partners from 2005 until 2014. Metz worked for Black & Decker from 1992 until 2005, where he held numerous positions in senior management. Metz holds an undergraduate degree from the University of Delaware and an MBA from the Kenan-Flagler Business School at the University of North Carolina at Chapel Hill.

Vista Outdoor's debt was over $1 billion when Metz was hired in 2017. As of December 2019, that debt has been reduced to $562 million. A large portion of this debt reduction is attributable to selling Savage Arms and other subsidiaries. Metz moved Vista Outdoor's headquarters back to Minnesota to cut costs but also to take advantage of what it sees as a favorable business environment in Minnesota.

Metz resigned in early 2023 after Vista Outdoor's board of directors expressed a loss of confidence in his leadership.

=== Mark W. DeYoung ===
Mark W. DeYoung was Vista Outdoor's first chairman and CEO. DeYoung retired from Vista Outdoor in July 2017. Independent board member Michael Callahan was acting as interim CEO and chairman as of the same date.

Before heading Vista Outdoor, DeYoung was president and CEO of Alliant Techsystems (ATK) from 2010 to 2015. During his tenure, ATK completed acquisitions of Savage Arms and Bushnell. In 2015, DeYoung led the transaction that spun-off ATK's sporting goods business to create Vista Outdoor and merged ATK's aerospace and defense units with Orbital Sciences forming Orbital ATK. DeYoung previously headed ATK's Armament Systems group, the company's largest business. Under DeYoung, this unit expanded into new markets and increased its revenue from $600 million in fiscal year 2003 to $2.1 billion in fiscal year 2010.

DeYoung started his career with Hercules Aerospace in Salt Lake City, Utah, in 1985. He held numerous management positions at Hercules in its solid rocket motor and composite structures businesses. After ATK acquired Hercules in 1995, DeYoung continued to advance and held roles in finance, operations, composite structures, human resources, and munitions. DeYoung earned an undergraduate degree in business at Weber State University, in Ogden, Utah. He holds an MBA from Westminster College in Salt Lake City, Utah where he taught management and finance and was named "Adjunct Professor of the Year." DeYoung is also a member of Orbital ATK's board of directors.

Under DeYoung, Vista Outdoor took on about $1 billion of debt to finance a series of acquisitions. Many of the companies that were acquired started encountering problems after post-acquisition departures of their founders and senior executives.

== Operations ==
Vista Outdoor has about 5,800 employees worldwide, with 4,000 in the United States. The company has manufacturing and support facilities spread over 11 American. states, Puerto Rico, Mexico, and Canada. It has overseas sales and sourcing operations in Mexico, Canada, Europe, Australia, New Zealand, and Asia. For example, 1,200 of Vista Outdoor's employees staff an ammunition factory in Lewiston, Idaho.

In June 2015, Vista announced that it would build its new corporate headquarters at Station Park in Farmington City, Utah. As of June 2015, construction was expected to begin during the summer of the same year, with completion expected in the middle of 2016. Station Park is a mixed-use development next to a commuter rail station.

The company's headquarters were moved to Utah after they applied for and received targeted tax credits from the Utah state government. In its application, Vista Outdoor said it would invest about $10 million in a new facility where about 90 highly-paid employees would work. Counting medical benefits, these employees would be paid about $125 million over seven years. Utah economic development officials expected about $6.7 million in new tax revenue from the project over this period.

In January 2016, Vista opened a factory in American Fork, Utah to manufacture Gold Tip and Bee Stinger archery products. The new factory is significantly larger than the facility it replaced. The additional space is used for research and development, improved production processes, and better employee amenities.

Vista opened a $35-million ammunition plant in Lewiston, Idaho, in 2017. As of February 2019, Vista employed about 1,135 people in Lewiston. Employment at Vista's Lewiston factory peaked at 1,500 in 2016. Since then, Vista has been reducing its headcount to save costs. This is necessary due to the sharp drop in ammunition sales that followed the election of President Donald Trump. In January 2019, the company asked workers to volunteer for early retirement, but only 20 workers in Lewiston accepted Vista's offer.

In November 2018, Vista closed its corporate headquarters in Farmington, Utah in order to reduce costs. Vista Outdoor relocated its headquarters to Anoka, Minnesota, near its ammunition factory there.

Vista Outdoor announced that Bozeman, Montana will be the location of its headquarters for outdoor products. Gallatin County will be a major focus of development.

== 2018 boycott ==
As part of the 2018 NRA boycott, activists asked retailers to stop selling all Vista Outdoor products over the company's support of the National Rifle Association of America and manufacturing of assault weapons. Some bicycle shops in Oregon stopped selling Vista Outdoor products. Some cancelled orders or returned stock.

Mountain Equipment Co-op (MEC), with 22 stores across Canada, was pressured by their members to stop selling Vista Outdoor products because it supports the NRA. MEC carries camping and bike gear from Vista Outdoor. MEC stopped orders from Vista Outdoor.

Recreational Equipment, Inc. (REI) stopped ordering Vista Outdoor products due to Vista's lack of action on reducing gun violence. REI lifted its ban on Vista Outdoor products and started carrying them again in September 2019. REI is one of Vista Outdoor's largest customers.

Running Room, a 122-store Canadian chain, canceled pending orders and stopped buying CamelBak products but sold remaining stock. They cited customer support for dropping the brand and said their health and fitness focus was incompatible with guns.
