= Horizon Coach Lines =

Horizon Coach Lines was an American motorcoach operator. It mainly provided charter bus service, but also provided tours and scheduled service. Horizon was the third-largest motorcoach operator in the United States and Canada. It was a subsidiary of the transportation consultant Transportation Management Services.

== History ==
Transportation Management Services started in 1995; its first big contract was to coordinate the transportation for COMDEX. In 2009, TMS acquired Horizon Coach Lines of Vancouver and Gray Line of Seattle. In 2012, Horizon acquired 15 markets from the bankrupt Coach America.

Horizon sold or closed its operations in 2014 and 2015. Florida operations in Miami, West Palm Beach and Jacksonville were sold to Academy Bus in 2014; Orlando operations were sold to ESCOT Bus Lines. Also in 2014, Vancouver operations were sold to Quick Coach and Durham operations were sold to Academy Bus. In 2015, Denver operations were sold to All Aboard America! and the remaining North Carolina operations were sold to Sunway Charters.
