= Coach America =

American holding company for bus services

Coach America American Coach Lines
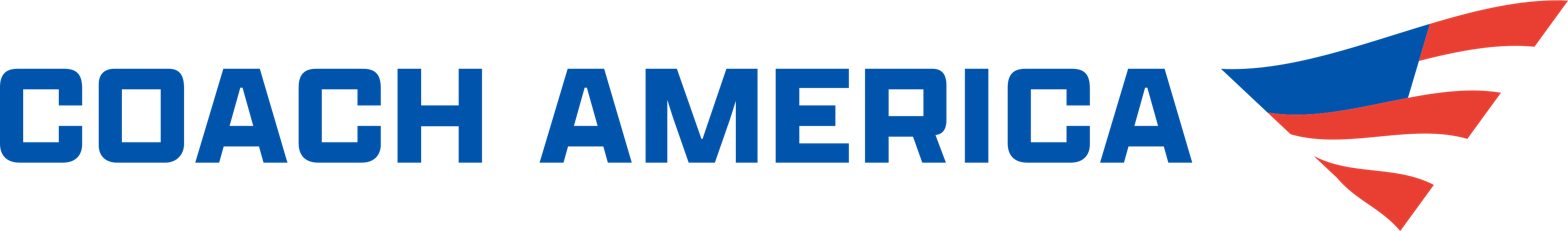

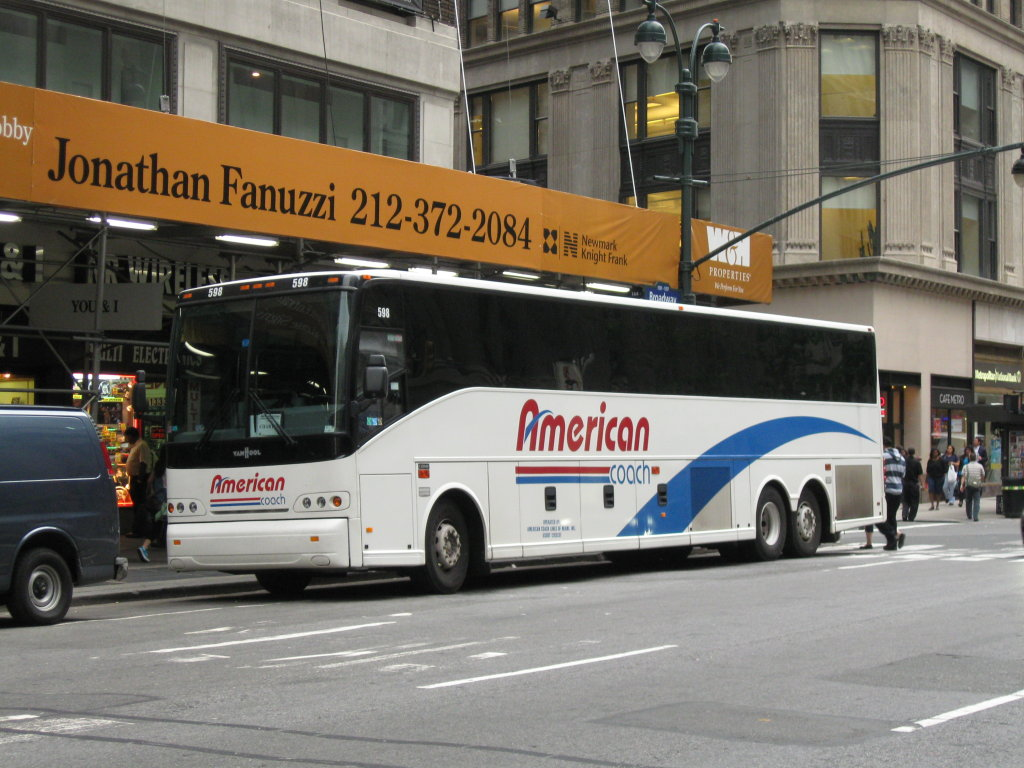
- American Coach Lines #598 in New York City.
- Parent: Fenway Partners
- Founded: 2003
- Headquarters: Holmdel, NJ
- Locale: United States
- Service area: United States
- Service type: Local bus service, commuter bus service, contract service, charter service, leasing services, crew transport
- Operator: Various Coach America/American Coach Lines subsidiaries nationwide
- Chief executive: Dylan Rosenthal and Salvatore Ciaravino
- Website: Coach America

Coach America, also doing business as American Coach Lines, was a holding company for American bus services owned by New York-based private equity firm Fenway Partners operating under the Coach America, American Coach Lines, and Gray Line names (at some locations, operating under pre-existing branding). Coach America consisted of all former Coach USA operations. Coach America is based in Holmdel, New Jersey.

== History ==
The properties that became Coach America were previously owned by Scotland-based Stagecoach Group as Coach USA's Western, South Central, and Southeastern divisions. Coach America was formed in 2003 when, after Stagecoach Group evaluated its Coach USA business, it decided to retain mostly its scheduled and local transit services in the Northeast and North Central region and put the rest of the company up for sale. The South Central and West divisions of Coach USA were sold to Kohlberg & Co., LLC, with these companies continuing to use the Coach USA name for a time, but eventually changing to Coach America. The Southeast division was sold to a separate buyer, Lincolnshire Management, and became American Coach Lines.

In 2006, Coach America purchased American Coach Lines from Lincolnshire. In November of that same year, Kohlberg sold Coach America to another private equity firm, Fenway Partners. Coach America acquired the Ohio carrier Lakefront Lines in 2008.

In early 2012, following a Chapter 11 bankruptcy, the assets of Coach America were sold in units. Stagecoach repurchased eight of the Coach America properties that it had sold in the 2003 divestiture, plus Lakefront Lines/Hopkins Transportation in Ohio. Tornado Bus Company bought the El Expreso operation, Professional Transportation, Inc. purchased Coach America's rail crew division, and Transportation Management Services purchased the remainder of Coach America's operations, forming Horizon Coach Lines, except for the Los Angeles DOT contract, which was sold to MV Transportation; three Florida locations were later flipped to Academy Bus. The Dallas office closed in July 2012.

In November 2021, the Coach America brand was revived when Dylan Rosenthal and Salvatore Ciaravino relaunched the company under new ownership and management. They opened a new office in New Jersey.

== Destinations ==
Coach America and its subsidiaries provide charter and transit services across the United States. Key service areas include:

- Alabama: Birmingham, Tuscaloosa, Mobile
- Arizona: Phoenix, Tucson
- Arkansas: Little Rock
- California: Sacramento, San Francisco, Oakland, Santa Clara, San Jose, Stockton, Fresno, Bakersfield, Los Angeles, Long Beach, Anaheim, Santa Ana, Riverside, San Diego
- Colorado: Denver, Aurora, Colorado Springs
- Connecticut: New Haven, Hartford
- Delaware: Wilmington
- District of Columbia: Washington, D.C.
- Florida: Jacksonville, Tallahassee, Panama City Beach, Gainesville, Orlando, Tampa Bay, Miami, Fort Myers, Fort Lauderdale
- Georgia: Atlanta, Albany, Valdosta, Savannah
- Illinois: Chicago, Peoria
- Indiana: Indianapolis
- Kansas: Kansas City
- Kentucky: Louisville, Lexington
- Louisiana: New Orleans, Shreveport, Baton Rouge
- Maryland: Columbia, Silver Spring, Baltimore
- Massachusetts: Boston, Cambridge, Worcester
- Michigan: Detroit, Grand Rapids, Warren
- Minnesota: Minneapolis, Saint Paul
- Mississippi: Jackson, Hattiesburg, Gulfport
- Missouri: Saint Louis
- Nebraska: Omaha
- Nevada: Las Vegas, Reno, Henderson
- New Hampshire: Manchester
- New Jersey: Jersey City, Atlantic City, Mt Laurel, Jersey Shore, Elizabeth, Newark, Paterson
- New Mexico: Albuquerque
- New York: New York City, Long Island, Staten Island, Westchester, Poughkeepsie, Albany, Binghamton, Syracuse, Rochester, Buffalo
- North Carolina: Charlotte, Winston-Salem, Raleigh/Durham, Greensboro
- Ohio: Columbus, Cincinnati, Cleveland
- Oklahoma: Oklahoma City, Tulsa
- Oregon: Portland
- Pennsylvania: Philadelphia, Pittsburgh, State College, Erie, Scranton, Allentown
- Rhode Island: Warwick, Providence
- South Carolina: Columbia, Mount Pleasant, Charleston
- Tennessee: Nashville, Memphis, Chattanooga, Knoxville
- Texas: Dallas, San Antonio, Houston, Austin, El Paso, Fort Worth, Corpus Christi
- Utah: Salt Lake City, Provo
- Virginia: Richmond, Newport News, Norfolk, Chesapeake, Virginia Beach
- Washington: Seattle, Spokane
- West Virginia: Charleston
- Wisconsin: Milwaukee, Madison, Green Bay

== See also ==
- Peter Pan Bus Lines
