= Easton, Nova Scotia =

Community in Nova Scotia, Canada

Coordinates: 44°18′39.43″N 65°52′39.46″W

Easton in Nova Scotia

Easton is a community in the Canadian province of Nova Scotia, located in Digby County. Former names of the community include New Jerusalem, a biblical name, and Enoch Mullen Settlement, named for an early settler who arrived here around 1856.
