= Global Rescue =

Private rescue and security company

- Company type: Private
- Industry: Medical Evacuation, Security Evacuation, Crisis Response
- Founded: 2004
- Headquarters: Lebanon, New Hampshire, United States
- Key people: Daniel Richards (founder and CEO)
- Website: https://www.globalrescue.com

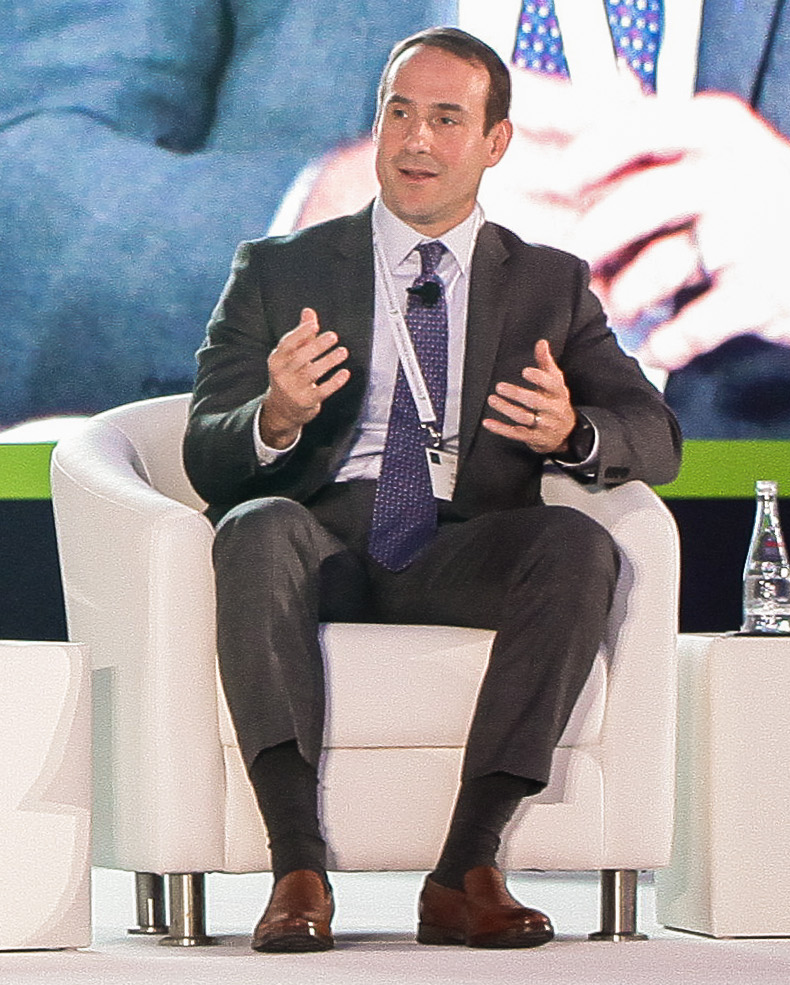
Dan Richards in October 2019

Global Rescue is a crisis response, medical evacuation and security extraction company with additional services such as field rescue, medical advisory, and telehealth. The company performs field rescues, sending critical care paramedics and military special forces veterans to the site of an emergency. Founded in partnership with Johns Hopkins Medicine, Global Rescue identifies, monitors, and responds when members experience a medical or security emergency away from home. Global Rescue provided services to its members during major events including the 2024 Washington wildfires, the Israeli–Palestinian conflict, the Sudanese civil war, the COVID-19 pandemic, the April 2015 Nepal Earthquake, the 2013 civil unrest in Egypt, the 2011 Arab Spring uprisings, the 2011 tsunami in Japan, and the 2010 Haiti earthquake.

== Organization ==
Global Rescue is a membership organization offering individual and corporate memberships on a short-term or annual basis. Global Rescue has operations centers and offices in Manila, Philippines; Islamabad, Pakistan; San Juan, Puerto Rico; and Lebanon, New Hampshire. Clients include the U.S. Ski Team, United States Postal Service, LPGA and NASA.

Global Rescue conducts thousands of rescue operations per year.

== History ==
Global Rescue was founded in 2004 by Daniel Richards, an investment banker and private equity investor. Global Rescue was recognized as a Fast Company "Most Innovative Company" in 2024. Inc. awarded Global Rescue its "Best in Business" honor in 2022, the same year the firm received its ISO 9001 certification. CNN calls Global Rescue an "extra layer of protection" for Olympic athletes and National Geographic advises trekkers to "Join Global Rescue." Among the global events for which Global Rescue has provided crisis response services in the 2006 Israeli conflict in Beirut, Lebanon; the 2008 terror attacks in Mumbai, India; the 2010 ash cloud in Western Europe; the 2012 coup attempt in Mali; and the 2015 earthquake in Nepal.

== Awards and recognition ==
Global Rescue has earned accolades and wards from several travel publications.

- Global Rescue won the prestigious 2025 Skift IDEA Award in the Industry Innovators - Business Travel category.
- In 2024, Global Rescue was listed as a Fast Company "Most Innovative Company".
- Inc. Magazine awarded Global Rescue it's "Best in Business" award in 2022, the year the firm received its ISO 9001] Certification.
- In 2021, Outside Magazine named Global Rescue a "Best Place to Work"
- In 2014, CNN called Global Rescue the "extra layer of protection" for Olympic athletes.
