= Easton, Isle of Wight =

Village on the Isle of Wight, England

Coordinates: 50°40′31″N 1°30′56″W

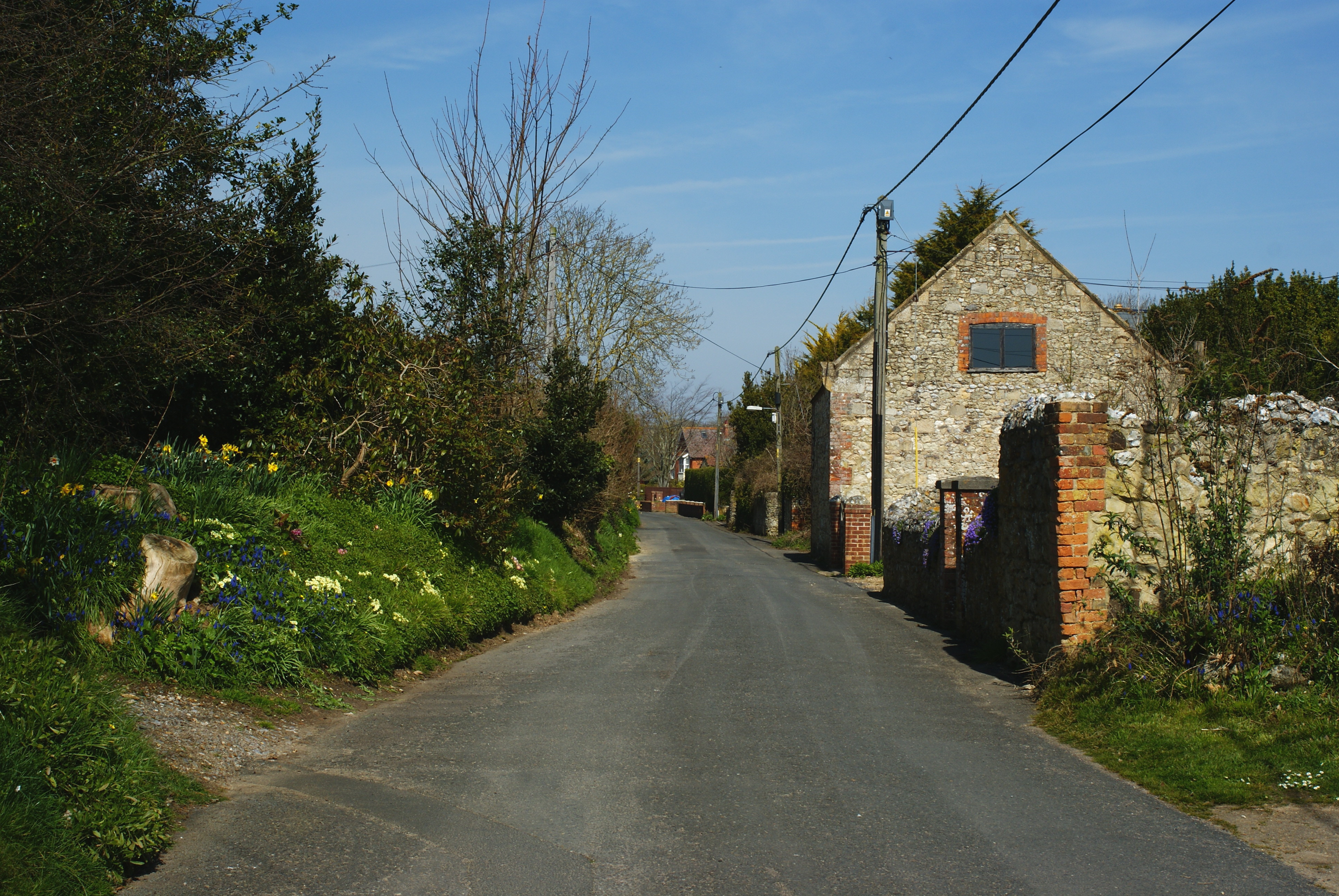
Easton Lane, Freshwater

Easton is a village on the Isle of Wight. It is located close to Totland on the west side of the island and forms part of the parish of Freshwater. (where the population at the 2011 Census was included)
