= Life Line Screening =

American health screening company

- Company type: Private
- Industry: Healthcare
- Founded: Florida, U.S., 1993
- Headquarters: Independence, OH, U.S.
- Area served: United States
- Key people: Mark S Hanley, Chairman; Matt Miller (CEO); Andrew Manganaro (Chief Medical Officer)
- Services: Preventive Health Screenings
- Number of employees: 1000+
- Website: www.lifelinescreening.com

Life Line Screening is a privately run prevention and wellness company founded in 1993, with operational offices in the Cleveland, Ohio, area. The company operates community-based health screening services for adults aged 50 and up across the United States. Life Line Screening is partnered with numerous insurance companies, hospitals and organizations including Women in Technology International, Heritage Valley Health System, Carolina Vascular, Mission Hospital, and Lake Norman Regional Medical Center.

== History ==
The company was founded in Florida in 1993 by Colin Scully and Timothy Phillips. By 1998, the company had expanded across the United States, offering screenings to more than 500,000 people. The company added finger-stick blood testing to its screening services to screen for complete cholesterol count (lipid panel), diabetes (glucose) and inflammation (C-reactive protein) in 2007. That same year, Life Line Screening launched its operations in the U.K. In 2008, services expanded to include atrial fibrillation screenings.

In 2009, BBC News published a warning over private health scans, saying that private companies which provide screenings were often "expensive unnecessary and misleading." The article also criticized the company for not warning people of any restrictions (such as false positives and false negatives) and other disadvantages due to screening.

In 2010, a clinical research study was conducted using data from 3.1 million patients who completed a medical and lifestyle questionnaire and were evaluated by ultrasound imaging for the presence of AAA (abdominal aortic aneurysm) by Life Line Screening in 2003 to 2008. The study found a positive association between increasing years of smoking and cigarettes smoked and a negative association with smoking cessation. Results also showed that excess weight was linked with increased AAA risk, whereas exercise and consumption of nuts, vegetables and fruits were linked with reduced risk. Based on the results of this study, researchers were able to develop a simple scoring system that detects large abdominal aortic aneurysms in a broader at-risk population to include women and those younger than 65. According to principal investigator Giampaolo Greco, the current U.S. Preventive Services Task Force (USPSTF) guidelines would capture one-third of these large aneurysms, whereas two-thirds would be identified using the new system.

In April 2013, the Journal of the American College of Cardiology published a study that relied on Life Line Screening data from a population-based screening study of more than 3.6 million Americans. Results showed the prevalence of peripheral artery disease (PAD) increased from 1 in 50 in the 40-to-50-year-old age group, to nearly 1 in 3 in the 90-to-100-year-old age group. Another finding displayed the prevalence of PAD, carotid artery stenosis (CAS) and AAA was higher not only with overall increased age, but for both men and women. Researchers noted that this association between age and PAD existed for both symptomatic and asymptomatic patients.

In partnership with Life Line Screening, Oxford University published a 2013 clinical research study with data drawn from over 290,000 vascular screenings performed by Life Line Screening between 2008 and 2012 across the UK and Ireland. Results from the study revealed that chronic cardiovascular diseases, including abdominal aortic aneurysm, narrowing of a main artery in the neck, irregular heartbeat and circulatory problems in the legs – occur approximately 10 years earlier in men than women.

That same year, Life Line Screening commissioned a study that collected information from more than 2.7 million health screenings and was analyzed by outside researchers and revealed two findings. The first finding points to the rising rate of (PAD) in women, a reflection on the increase in the number of women who smoke and the second finding revealed that people with cardiovascular disease present in one part of the body are more likely to have it in other parts of the body, as well. These study findings were published in the July 2013 edition of Postgraduate Medicine.

== Operations ==
The company has conducted more than 8 million health screenings worldwide since its foundation and averages over 1 million screenings per year, which include ultrasound scans, blood screenings, and electrocardiographs. Common diseases that may be detected by such screenings include Carotid artery stenosis, osteoporosis, atrial fibrillation, peripheral arterial disease (PAD) and abdominal aortic aneurysm (AAA).
