= Reid Jackson =

Canadian professional surfer

Reid Jackson is a Canadian professional surfer.

The 2011 documentary film Tipping Barrels by director Ben Gulliver follows Reid Jackson and his brother Arran as they surf through the waves and fauna of the Great Bear Rainforest on the west coast of British Columbia, Canada.
