= Lincolnshire Management =

American private equity firm

- Type: Private
- Industry: Private equity
- Founded: 1986; 40 years ago
- Founder: Frank Wright, Steven Kumble
- Headquarters: New York, New York, United States
- Key people: T.J. Maloney (CEO)
- Products: Leveraged buyout
- Total assets: $1.7 billion
- Number of employees: 20+
- Website: www.lincolnshiremgmt.com

Lincolnshire Management is a private equity firm focused on investments and acquisitions in middle-market companies across a range of industries. In 2010, Private Equity News ranked Lincolnshire as a top ten performing private equity firm. Additionally, In 2011, CNN Money /Fortune Magazine ranked Lincolnshire Management as the 5th ranked private equity firm.

The firm, which is based in New York City, was founded in 1986 by Frank Wright and Steven Kumble.

== History ==
Prior to founding Lincolnshire, Wright had spent 31 years at Manufacturers Hanover Trust Company, where he ran the special finance division, which handled financing for leveraged buyouts in the early 1980s. After Wright's death in 1992, James Tozer was named president and chief executive and was succeeded in 1998 by T.J. Maloney. In 2005, Kumble left the firm to found Corinthian Capital.

The firm has raised approximately $1.7 billion and completed more than 55 investments since inception across four private equity funds. Lincolnshire did not raise its first institutional private equity fund until 1994 when it raised $120 million of commitments. In 2008, Lincolnshire completed fundraising for its fourth private equity fund with $835 million of investor commitments, in excess of its original target and nearly twice the size of its $433 million third fund in 2005.

Among the firm's most notable investments include Riddell, Prince Sports, and American Coach Lines. In August 2009 Lincolnshire invested in Wabash National Corporation, a manufacturer of flat-bed trailers, which had previously acquired Transcraft, a Lincolnshire portfolio company.
