= Fenway Partners =

American private equity firm

- Type: Private
- Industry: Private Equity
- Founded: 1994; 32 years ago
- Founder: Richard Dresdale, Peter Lamm
- Headquarters: New York, New York, United States
- Products: Leveraged buyout, Growth capital
- Total assets: $2.1 billion
- Number of employees: 25+
- Website: www.fenwaypartners.com

Fenway Partners is an American private equity firm that makes leveraged buyout and growth capital investments in transportation logistics, consumer products, and manufacturing companies in the middle market.

== History ==
The firm was founded in 1994 by Richard Dresdale (formerly Clayton, Dubilier & Rice) and Peter Lamm (formerly Butler Capital Partners) and has over $2 billion of capital under management. Since its inception, the firm has raised three private equity funds. Fenway's first fund closed on approximately $525 million of capital commitments in 1996 and just two years later, in 1998, the firm raised an additional $900 million of capital. Investments made in the 1998 fund, prior to the collapse of the dot-com bubble, affected its performance. The firm raised a successor fund in 2006 and 2007 with approximately $700 million of commitments from institutional investors. After this, the firm have not raised a new flagship fund, with its main asset being its investment in Riddell Sports Group.

== Investments ==
In 2002 Fenway acquired the molding equipment and customer base of Premier Tile. The price for the acquisition was $8.25 million. The firm's investments have included Targus, 1-800 Contacts, Coach America, Riddell, Bell Sports, and Easton.

Targus Corporation

Fenway Partners acquired Targus Group International, an Anaheim, California-based company, for $382.5 million on November 22, 2005. Targus was the original creator of carrying cases for portable computers and have since expanded into multiple electronics accessories including; backpacks, locks, keyboards and keypads, privacy screens, among others. The company had also acquired Sena, a leather case maker, adding to its product line cases for smartphones.

1-800 Contacts

In 2007, Fenway Partners acquired 1-800 Contacts, a vendor and distributor of brand name contact lens, located in Draper, Utah. The price set for the acquisition of 1-800 Contacts was at premium of 21% over the highest reported share value within the last year and 34% over the closing price within the last month. In total, the purchase price was valued at $340 million.

In June 2012, Fenway Partners sold 1-800 Contacts to WellPoint Inc. for a price reported at about $900 million.

Riddell Sports Group

On July 7, 2003, Fenway Partners announced its acquisition of sporting goods manufacturer Riddell Sports Group. Riddell helmets are worn by more than 85% of NFL players, and in 2002 they released the first computer engineered football helmet in its efforts to help reduce concussions among athletes. As the leading manufacturer of football helmets, among other products such as pads and collectible replica items, Riddell posted revenues of over $100 million in 2002, the same figure for which it was acquired by Fenway Partners the following year.

Bell Sports

Bell Sports, a helmet and apparel manufacturer, was acquired by Fenway Partners in August 2004. Bell was acquired for an estimated $240 million. Following the acquisition, Fenway Partners merged Bell Sports with Riddell Sports Group.

Among the firm's most notable realized investments are high-end jewelry retailer Harry Winston and the Simmons Bedding Company.

== Mergers ==
Riddell Sports Group/Bell Sports

Fenway Partners acquired Riddell Sports Group in 2003 and Bell Sports in 2004 to expand its market share in the sports industry. The combination of the two companies established a head-protection research and development facility in Santa Cruz, California. Combined, the entities produced over 8 million helmets annually with projected 2004 revenues of $300 million. CEO and president of Bell Sports, Bill Fry, was appointed to lead the combined companies’ management team due to his efforts in putting Bell back on top of its market since he joined in 2001. Bill Sherman, Riddell CEO will remain in his current position as well as serving on the board of directors in regards to the company.

Riddell Bell Holdings/Easton Sports Inc.

In 2006, Fenway Partners merged Riddell Bell Holdings with Easton Sports, a sporting goods manufacturer with divisions in cycling, baseball, hockey, motocross, and archery. At the time of the merger, the combined entity's annual revenues were projected to exceed $600 million. Easton Sports Inc. was a subsidiary company of Jas D. Easton and its only subsidiary who was part of the merger. The head of Easton Sports, Jim Easton, was appointed Chair of the new combined entity. Following the transaction, Easton Sports owner Jim Easton was named chairman of the combined company, named Riddell Bell Holdings.

== Miscellaneous ==
The firm was named loosely about Fenway Park, but the firm is based in New York City and has no connections with the Boston Red Sox, Fenway Park, or Fenway Sports Group.
