= James L. Easton =

American engineer and archer (1935–2023)

Vice-President of the International Olympic Committee
- In office 2002–2006
- IOC President: Jacques Rogge (2002-06)

President of the World Archery
- In office 1989–2005
- Preceded by: Francesco Gnecchi-Ruscone
- Succeeded by: Uğur Erdener

Personal details
- Born: James Leland Easton; July 26, 1935 Los Angeles, California, U.S.
- Died: December 4, 2023 (aged 88)
- Spouse: Phyllis Easton
- Parent: James D. Easton
- Education: University of California, Los Angeles
- Occupation: Businessman

James Leland Easton (July 26, 1935 – December 4, 2023) was an American businessman, archer, and philanthropist. He served as the chairman, chief executive officer and President of BRG Sports. He was the President of the World Archery Federation from 1989 to 2005, and he was a member of the International Olympic Committee from 1994.

== Early life ==
James L. Easton was born on July 26, 1935. His father, James D. Easton, was a businessman and archer. Easton graduated from the University of California, Los Angeles, with a bachelor of science in engineering in 1959. Easton had a wife, Phyllis.

== Business career ==
Easton worked for the Douglas Aircraft Company from 1959 to 1964. In the late 1960s, Easton joined his father's company, Jas. D. Easton, where they, along with brother Bob Easton, developed the first aluminum ski poles, followed by the first aluminum baseball bats. Both sports equipment items had previously been wooden. In the same manner, they developed aluminum hockey sticks instead of the traditional wooden sticks in the 1980s. Easton served as the chairman, chief executive officer and President of Jas. D. Easton since 1973. Easton served on the board of directors of Ambassadors Group from 2001 to 2006.

== Archery ==
Easton served as the President of the World Archery Federation from 1989 to 2005. He was inducted into the Archery Hall of Fame in 1997. Easton was member of the International Olympic Committee from 1994 until his death in 2023.

== Philanthropy ==
Easton served as the Chairman of the Easton Foundations, a family philanthropic foundation. Easton was appointed to the board of trustees of the UCLA Foundation in 1985. He was awarded the UCLA Medal in 2014. He served on the Board of Visitors of the UCLA Anderson School of Management. In 2015, he donated US$11 million to endow the Easton Technology Management Center at UCLA Anderson.

== Death ==
Easton died on December 4, 2023, at the age of 88.

Sporting positions
Preceded by Francisco Gnecchi-Ruscone	President of the World Archery; 1989–2005	Succeeded by Uğur Erdener
