= Hoyt Archery =

American bow manufacturer

Hoyt Archery is an American manufacturer of recurve and compound bows located in Salt Lake City, Utah. Most notable for their competition recurve bows, which are featured prominently in the Olympics; every gold medalist in individual archery at the 2012 Summer Olympics shot a Hoyt recurve. Hoyt is owned by Jas. D. Easton, Inc.

== History ==
Hoyt was founded in 1931 in St. Louis, Missouri with Earl Hoyt Sr. and his son producing hand made cedar arrows and wooden bows. In 1983, Hoyt was purchased by California-based sporting goods equipment manufacturer Jas D. Easton Inc., and its headquarters moved to Salt Lake City. Hoyt is currently a division of the Easton-family owned Jas. D. Easton, Inc. which also owns Easton Technical Products, manufacturers of arrows, tent tubing and medical tubing.

== About Earl Hoyt Sr ==
Earl Hoyt Sr. was the founder, owner, and president of Hoyt archery and was born in 1911, where he lived in St. Louis, MO. In 1931 he started his company Hoyt Archery. In 1971 Earl married his wife Ann Weber Hoyt, they met many times at exhibition and on a tournament, and started to date around the 1960s. They later had a son, Bright Hoyt, born in 1980. Earl would sit behind Ann during competitions before they began to date.

== Technology ==
Zero Torque Hyper Cam: This is a patent-pending design that reduces the torque introduced by the cables. This cam system creates a balanced load by incorporating a split cable system which makes this a smooth, fast, and when the cams rotate they let off the most.

Zero Torque Cable Guard System: This cable guide is mounted reverse to allow the torque introduced by the normal cable guide to be directed in the opposite direction. This means that any torque created by the cams will be neutralized which means it will be easier to tune and align the bow.

X3 Cam & ½: This Cam system is adjustable by half an inch increments. This cam is available in 65% or 75% let off and has a lighter back wall which makes it smoother than the SVX cam.

X-Lite Prolock Pocket: The super tight tolerance pocket means the connection between the riser and limbs will make the bow even more accurate and consistent. This is important to have as tight tolerances in this area since it is critical to the accuracy and consistency of the bow.

X-Act Grip: This grip is designed to allow the user to consistently put your hand in the same and right place. Proper Hand placement is critical to ensure accurate and consistent shots. The engineers at Hoyt shaped the grip to ensure that you get the best hand placement.

Uniform Stress Distribution: These limbs are contoured limbs that as they bend they store more and more energy which at full draw it will produce the most speed and create less stress on the limbs since they become straighter as they are being loaded.

Ultraflex Limb System: This limb system works with the DFX cam system which creates a head position that you can achieve consistently. This system makes a 30.5 inch axle to axle bow feel like a 34-inch axle to axle length bow.

== In popular culture ==
The Hoyt Buffalo hunting recurve was used by the character Hawkeye in the Avengers movie, as well as by Katniss Everdeen in The Hunger Games series. The Hoyt Gamemaster II was used by Hawkeye in Avengers: Age of Ultron. The Hoyt/Spectra bow was the principal silent weapon used by Sylvester Stallone as John Rambo in Rambo: First Blood Part II and Rambo III. In the backstory Rambo had attained skill with a bow since childhood. In the film he uses arrows tipped with explosive warheads.
