= Fox Factory =

American company best known for their FOX Suspension Products

Fox Factory Holding Corp.
- Type: Public
- Traded as: Nasdaq: FOXF; S&P 600 component
- Founded: 1977; 49 years ago, in California
- Headquarters: Duluth, Georgia, U.S.
- Key people: Douglas J. Grimm (Interim CEO); Dennis Schemm (CFO); Chris Tutton (president, Sport Specialty Group); Rich Winters (president, Powered Vehicle Group)
- Revenue: ▲US$1.467 billion (2025)
- Net income: ▼ −US$545 million (2025)
- Number of employees: 2,600 (2019)
- Website: ridefox.com

Fox Factory Holding Corp. is an American company best known for their FOX brand of off-road racing suspension components.

== History ==
In February 1974 Geoff Fox founded Moto-X Fox Inc. (later Fox Head Inc.) which distributed components for motocross bikes. With the help of Steve Simons Geoff was developing a spring shock absorber named Fox Shox. At about the same time Geoff’s brother Bob Fox was developing what became known as Fox AirShox in a friend's garage. Late in 1974 or early 1975 Bob joined Moto-X Fox Inc. as leader of the Fox AirShox division. In 1977 Bob separated the Airshox division from Moto-X Fox Inc. under the name Fox Factory Inc. (previously known as Fox Racing Shox, now known as FOX). A holding company, Fox Factory Holding, was established in 1978. Fox Factory produces suspension components for motorcycles, automobiles, all-terrain vehicles, side-by-sides, trophy trucks, snowmobiles, and mountain bikes.

In 2008 it was bought by a private equity firm, Compass Diversified Holdings. It went public in 2013.

== Acquisitions ==
From 2014 through 2021, Fox Factory acquired several groups spanning mountain bike, truck suspension, turn-key truck unfitting, performance car suspension, and custom designed adventure van categories.

=== Timeline ===
==== 2014 ====
Sport Truck USA, Coldwater, MI

Fox Acquired several brands under the "Sport Truck USA" umbrella, including;

- BDS Suspension: Premium suspension kits
- Zone Offroad: Entry-level suspension kits
- JKS Manufacturing: Jeep specific suspension kits

Race Face, Vancouver, B.C.

Manufactures and distributes high performance cycling components, apparel, and protection.

Easton

Manufactures and distributes bike components and apparel.

==== 2015 ====
Marzocchi (Bicycles)

Fox acquired certain assets of Marzocchi dedicated to mountain bike suspension.

==== 2017 ====
Tuscany Motors, Elkhart, IN

Vehicle upfitter focused on full-size trucks on Ford, Ram, and General Motors platforms.

==== 2019 ====
RideTech, Jasper, IN

Manufacturer of traditional, coilover, and air suspension systems for muscle cars, trucks, and hot rods.

==== 2020 ====
SCA Performance, Trussville, AL

Vehicle upfitter focused on full-size trucks on the Chevrolet, Ford, and RAM platforms. Brands brought to market under the SCA Performance umbrella include Black Widow, Rocky Ridge Trucks, and Rocky Mountain Truckworks.

==== 2021 ====
Outside Van, Portland, OR

Custom converter of adventure vans on the Mercedes Sprinter platform.

==== 2023 ====
Marucci Sports, Baton Rouge, LA

Fox acquired Marucci Sports, a sports apparel manufacturer primarily known as a bat supplier to Major League Baseball (MLB), for $572 million.

== Products ==
=== Mountain bike suspensions ===
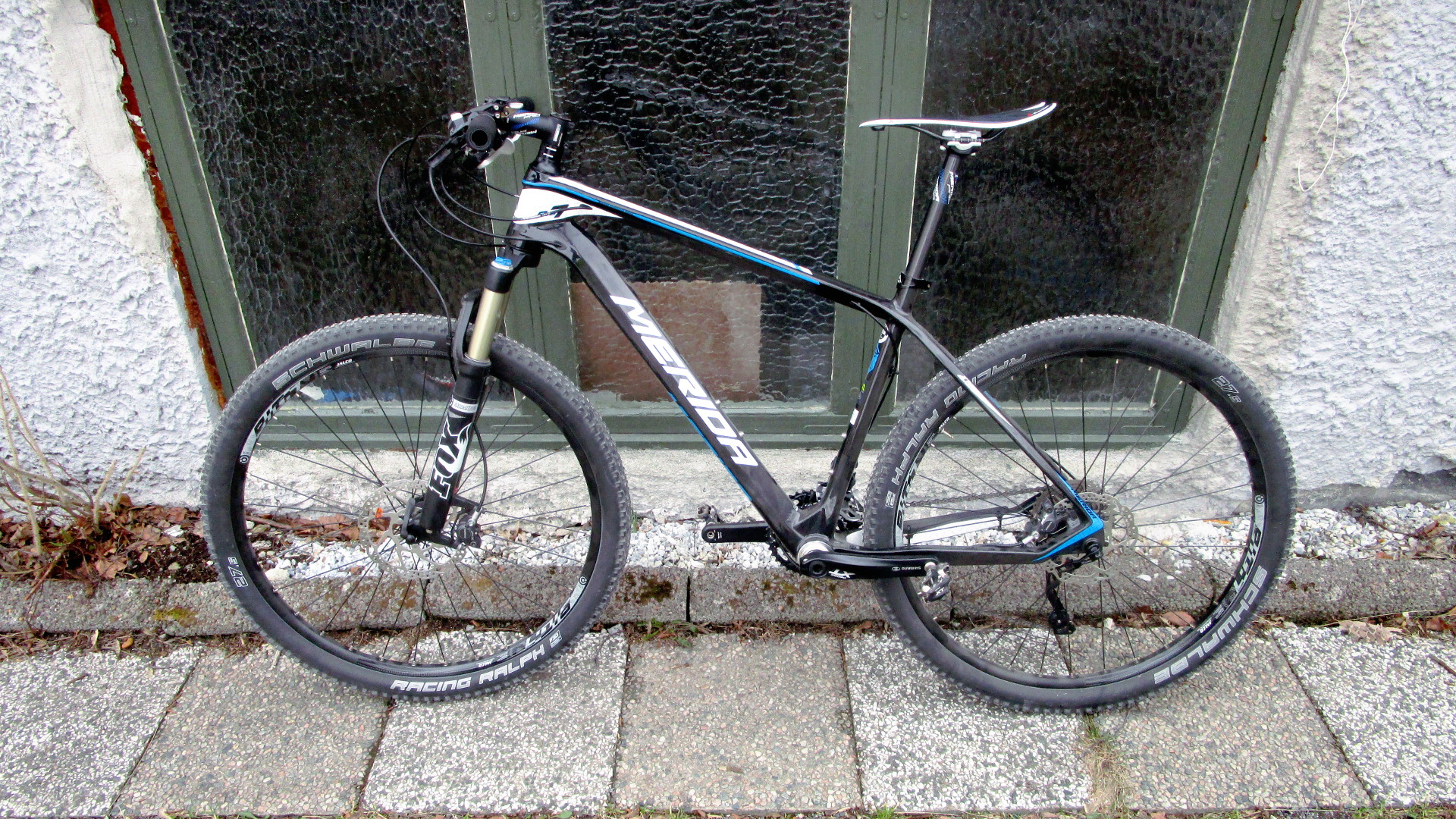
Merida Big Seven mountain bike with Fox front suspension

In 2016, sales of mountain bike related equipment (primarily suspension products) accounted for 56% of the company's total revenue.

==== Forks and Shocks ====
As of 2025, all available in 27.5", & 29" wheel sizes (except where noted) and tapered steerer tubes, with straight 1-1/8" tubes on select models.

There are 3 product lines for both forks and shocks: Performance, Performance Elite and Factory. Performance suspension is the lower end line and often comes OEM (Original Equipment Manufacturer) on many cheaper bikes. They have older dampers, technology and design. Performance Elite and Factory are the higher end, having the same damper options and only differ for the stanchion coating.

Fox naming of the forks relies on the stanchion diameter, and the available models are 32, 34, 36, 38 and 40. These can have different dampers, depending on the quality of the damper; Grip/Grip2, Fit GRIP/Fit4, GripX/X2, which provide different ranges of adjustability of both high and low speed compression and rebound. As of January 2025 the available forks are:

Fox 32, travel 40-100mm for gravel and light cross country use

Fox 34, travel 120-140mm for cross country and light trail use

Fox 36, travel 150-160mm for trail and enduro use

Fox 38, travel 160-180mm for hard enduro use

Fox 40, travel 203mm for downhill use (only dual crown fork)

Fox 49, travel 203mm for downhill use (temporary name for its 29' variant)

As of January 2025 the available rear shocks are:

Fox Float SL, for cross country use

Fox Float, for trail and cross country use

Fox Float X, for All-Mountain use

Fox DHX, for All-Mountain use

Fox Float X2, for gravity (enduro and downhill) use

Fox DHX2, for gravity (enduro and downhill) use

The DHX and DHX2 are coil sprung shocks, while all of the others are air-sprung

(stanchion size in mm, air spring type, travel range in mm)

== See also ==
- Motorcycle suspension
