= Giro (company) =

American sports equipment manufacturer

- Industry: Clothing
- Founded: 1985; 41 years ago
- Founder: Jim Gentes
- Headquarters: Scotts Valley, California, U.S.
- Products: Bike helmets and associated products
- Parent: Revelyst
- Website: www.giro.com

Giro is an American manufacturer of snow and cycling helmets; snow and mountain-biking goggles; cycling and mountain bike apparel and shoes; and softgoods for cycling, skiing and snowboarding. The company was founded in 1985 by Jim Gentes and was headquartered in Scotts Valley, California. It was acquired by Bell Sports in 1996.

Giro is now part of Revelyst and is based at Revelyst’s offices in Irvine, CA. Giro and Bell Sports were previously owned by Vista Outdoor and had been purchased along with other brands for $400 million in 2016. In 2023, Vista Outdoor announced that the facility in Scotts Valley, California that serves as the base for Giro would be closed. Numerous relevant employees were laid off. That action had part of a move by Vista Outdoor to integrate Giro into Fox Racing.
