= Bell Sports =

American manufacturer of helmets

- Formerly: Bell Auto Parts; Bell Helmet Company; Bell-Riddell
- Type: Subsidiary; Private (1923–80)
- Founded: 1923; 103 years ago
- Fate: Merged into Riddell in 1980 to form "Bell-Riddell", now owned by Revelyst and based in Irvine, CA.
- Headquarters: United States
- Key people: Roy Richter
- Products: Bicycle, motorcycle and racing helmets
- Parent: Revelyst
- Divisions: Motorcycle; Bike
- Website: bellhelmets.com

Bell Sports is an American bicycle, motorcycle and racing helmet manufacturer. The company is a subsidiary of Revelyst having been previously owned by Vista Outdoor and BRG Sports, which owned Riddell football helmets. BRG Sports had sold some of its brands (including Bell, Giro, C-Preme, and Blackburn) to Vista in 2016.

== History ==
The company started in 1923 as "Bell Auto Parts," named for its location in Bell, California. Roy Richter began working for Bell Auto Parts in 1933. In 1945, he purchased the store for $1,000. Richter produced his first race car helmets in 1954. The "Bell Helmet Company" was established as a division of Bell Auto Parts in 1956. Bell introduced its Star model, the first full-face motorcycle helmet on the market, in 1968. In 1971, Bell produced the first full-face off-road motorcycle helmet.

Bell made its first production helmet in 1954. It was the result of months of research and development. Richter, with the help of veteran naval pilot Frank Heacox, reverse engineered numerous helmets, including some used in military aviation. Heacox played a key role in developing Bell Helmet's first products, most importantly by using the helmets himself, both in races and on the street. These experiences with the prototypes led to many useful suggestions. That first helmet, named the Bell 500, featured a polyurethane foam liner inside a hand-laminated fiberglass outer shell. Laminating and polishing helmets by hand was relatively expensive but Richter believed it resulted in a stronger helmet.

Several members of the famous Bill Stroppe Lincoln Team wore the Bell 500 in the Carrera Panamericana Road Race in 1954. A Bell helmet was used in the Indianapolis 500 for the first time by Cal Niday in 1955. Niday crashed during lap 177 of the race and suffered several major injuries. Despite suffering a skull fracture, Nidal credited the helmet for preventing even more serious injury. By 1956, helmet sales were far above projections. This resulted in the formation of the Bell Helmet Company as a subsidiary of Bell Auto Parts. The helmet operation employed at least four people working full-time producing helmets in a facility next door to the original Bell Auto Parts location.

Bell moved to Long Beach, California in 1968. The first Bell helmet with full-face protection was developed at this location.

In 1980, the company merged with football helmet maker Riddell to form "Bell-Riddell". The Bell-Riddell motorcycle division was sold in 1991, becoming "Bell Helmets". The remaining company was renamed "Bell Sports". In 1999, the auto racing division was sold and split into two separate companies called "Bell Racing Company" (North America) and "Bell Racing Europe" (Europe, Asia and Africa). Bell Sports reacquired Bell Helmets in 2002, creating Bell Powersports. In 2005, it reacquired Bell Racing Company, and was itself merged into Easton-Bell Sports in 2006. Vista Outdoor acquired the company in 2016.

In 2023, Vista Outdoor laid off numerous employees at Bell Sports facility in Scotts Valley, California. This is part of an effort to integrate relevant brands into Fox Racing.

== Products ==
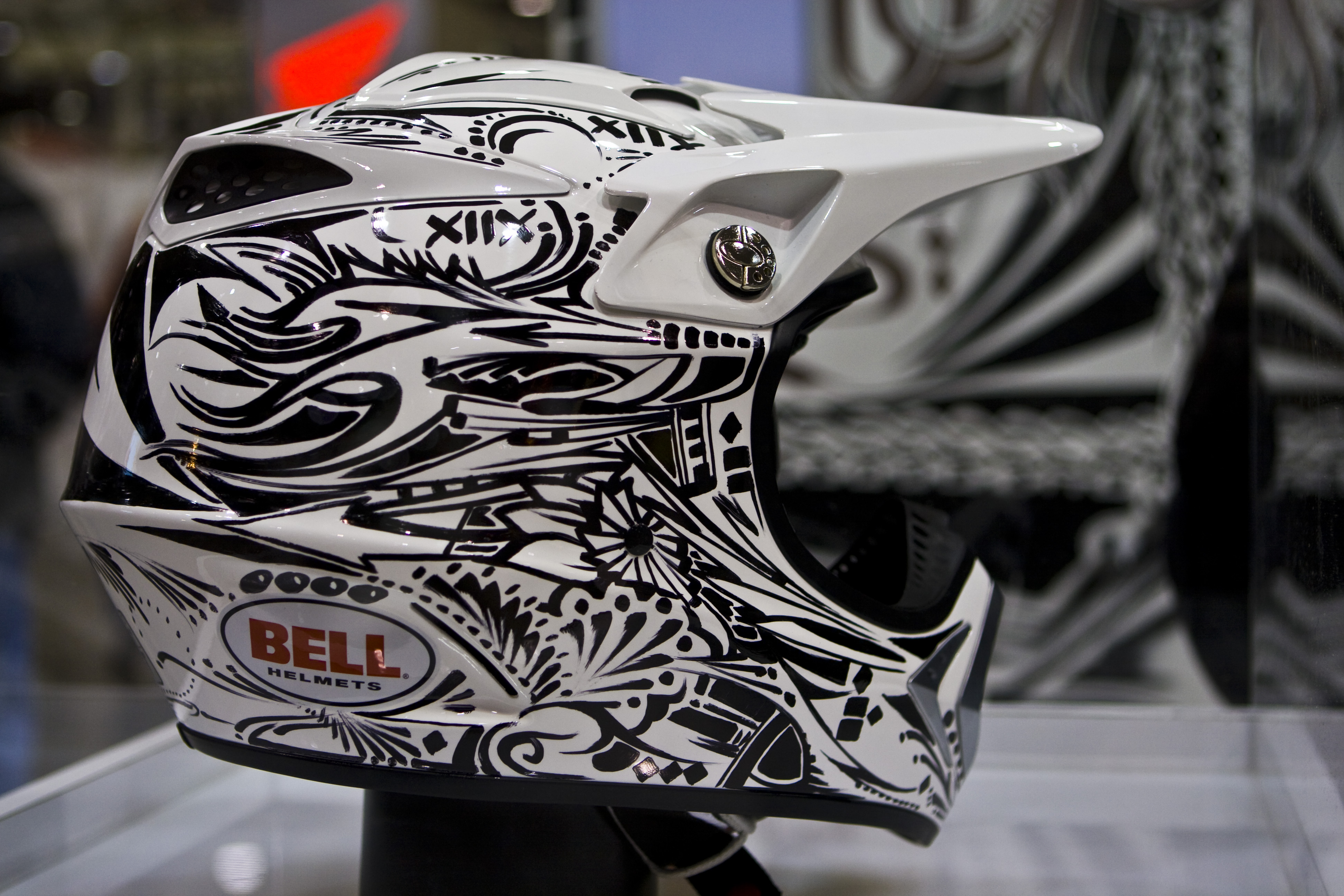
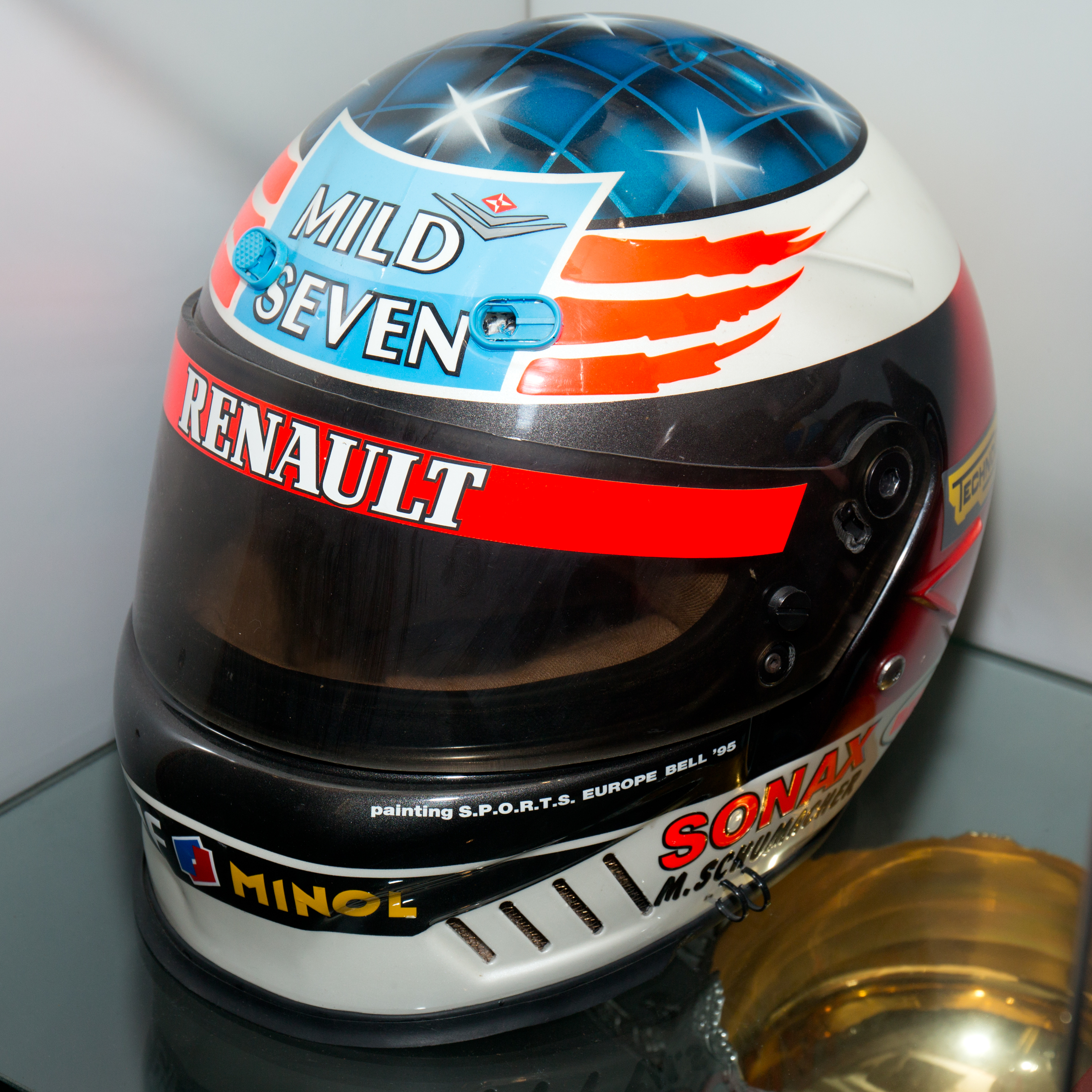
On the left is a designer custom motorcycle helmet, on the right is the helmet of Formula One driver Michael Schumacher exhibited at the Grand Prix Museum

The Bell Star MIPS (Multi-directional Impact Protection System) is the entry-level model of the Bell Star line of motorcycle helmets. It is made using a slip-plane design and a foam EPS liner. The EPS liner is designed to deal with main impact forces while the MIPS helps prevent brain injuries such as concussions by reducing rotational forces. Their Bell Star helmet was listed as the safest full-face road helmet after being tested by Australia's independent Consumer Rating and Assessment of Safety Helmets team.

== Relationship to Bell Racing ==
Bell Racing USA and Bell Racing Europe were independent companies that used the Bell trademark under license. In 2019 OMP Racing acquired the majority of shares in Bell Racing Helmets Group and continues to use the Bell trademark under license.

== See also ==
- Roy Richter
