= Barry McKinlay =

Canadian ice hockey player

- Born: August 8, 1967 (age 58) Edmonton, Alberta, Canada
- Height: 6 ft 3 in (191 cm)
- Weight: 192 lb (87 kg; 13 st 10 lb)
- Position: Defence
- Shot: Right
- Played for: AHL; Prince Edward Island Senators; CoHL/UHL; Thunder Bay Thunder Cats; Thunder Bay Senators; Rockford IceHogs; WPHL; Rockford IceHogs; CHL; Lubbock Cotton Kings; BISL; Bracknell Bees
- NHL draft: 206th overall, 1987; Montreal Canadiens
- Playing career: 1991–2004

Barry McKinlay (born August 8, 1967) is a Canadian retired professional ice hockey defenceman.

== Early life and education ==
McKinlay in 1967 in Edmonton, Alberta. He McKinley attended the University of Illinois at Chicago, where he played NCAA college hockey with the UIC Flames men's ice hockey team, earning him a Second Team All-CCHA spot.

== Career ==
McKinlay was selected by the Montreal Canadiens in the 10th round (206th overall) of the 1987 NHL entry draft.

McKinlay did not play regular season NHL games National Hockey League but went on to play 13 seasons of professional hockey, mostly in the Colonial Hockey League/United Hockey League, where he played 640 regular season and playoff games. McKinlay is one of seven defencemen in history to score 100 points in a professional hockey season (126) in 1997–98. He was a three-time UHL Defenceman of the year, and a four-time 1st Team All-Star.

McKinlay played the 2000–01 season with the Tupelo T-Rex of the Western Professional Hockey League (WPHL) where he was recognized by his peers as having the hardest shot in the WPHL, and was selected as the league's second best offensive defenceman (behind Mark DeSantis). Won the Hardest shot competition at the WPHL All-Star game (103.9 mph).

== Career statistics ==
			Regular season					Playoffs
Season	Team	League	GP	G	A	Pts	PIM	GP	G	A	Pts	PIM
1984–85	St. Albert Saints	AJHL	—	—	—	—	—	—	—	—	—	—
1985–86	St. Albert Saints	AJHL	52	21	51	72	102	—	—	—	—	—
1986–87	University of Illinois Chicago	NCAA	33	9	14	23	35	—	—	—	—	—
1987–88	University of Illinois Chicago	NCAA	38	15	31	46	81	—	—	—	—	—
1991–92	Thunder Bay Thunder Hawks	CoHL	48	17	28	45	25	13	2	6	8	8
1992–93	Thunder Bay Thunder Hawks	CoHL	55	17	39	56	47	11	2	3	5	11
1993–94	Prince Edward Island Senators	AHL	17	2	5	7	6	—	—	—	—	—
1993–94	Thunder Bay Senators	CoHL	40	14	43	57	53	9	3	6	9	11
1994–95	Prince Edward Island Senators	AHL	8	1	5	6	0	—	—	—	—	—
1994–95	Thunder Bay Senators	CoHL	65	26	54	80	100	11	4	13	17	4
1995–96	Thunder Bay Senators	CoHL	54	10	43	53	87	19	1	18	19	30
1996–97	Thunder Bay Thunder Cats	CoHL	65	32	58	90	82	11	6	10	16	16
1997–98	Thunder Bay Thunder Cats	UHL	74	36	90	126	40	5	3	4	7	2
1998–99	Bracknell Bees	BISL	11	6	6	12	4	—	—	—	—	—
1998–99	Thunder Bay Thunder Cats	UHL	34	15	27	42	24	13	5	4	9	8
1999–00	Rockford IceHogs	UHL	37	11	23	34	26	—	—	—	—	—
2000–01	Tupelo T-Rex	WPHL	59	21	47	68	20	10	3	6	9	12
2001–02	Lubbock Cotton Kings	CHL	64	15	43	58	45	—	—	—	—	—
2002–03	Lubbock Cotton Kings	CHL	55	15	20	35	55	—	—	—	—	—
2003–04	Port Huron Beacons	UHL	68	10	35	45	66	8	1	3	4	6
AHL totals			25	3	10	13	6	—	—	—	—	—
CHL totals			119	30	63	93	100	—	—	—	—	—
UHL (CoHL) totals			540	188	440	628	550	100	27	67	94	96

== Awards and honours ==
Award	Year
All-CCHA Second Team	1987-88
