= Larry Bernard =

Canadian ice hockey player

- Born: April 16, 1967 (age 59) Prince George, British Columbia, Canada
- Height: 6 ft 2 in (188 cm)
- Weight: 210 lb (95 kg; 15 st 0 lb)
- Position: Left wing
- Shot: Left
- Played for: Colorado/Denver Rangers; Kalamazoo Wings; Moncton Hawks
- NHL draft: 154th overall, 1985; New York Rangers
- Playing career: 1987–1996

Larry Bernard (born April 16, 1967) is a Canadian professional ice hockey scout, and a former left winger.

Bernard played 140 games in the International Hockey League (IHL) and 69 games in the American Hockey League (AHL). Bernard also won the Southern Hockey League championship with the Huntsville Channel Cats, in the league's only year of existence.

Bernard was an eighth-round draft pick of the New York Rangers in the 1985 NHL entry draft.

Bernard is a former player-coach of the Utica Bulldogs of the then-Colonial Hockey League. Bernard then coached at the junior hockey level with the Prince George Spruce Kings, Prince George Cougars, Prince Albert Raiders and Sarnia Sting. After being an amateur scout for the Tampa Bay Lightning, Bernard became a scout with the Rangers in 2015.

== Career statistics ==
| | | | Regular season | | | | | Playoffs |
| Season | Team | League | GP | G | A | Pts | PIM | GP | G | A | Pts | PIM |
|---|---|---|---|---|---|---|---|---|---|---|---|---|
| 1984–85 | Seattle Breakers | WHL | 63 | 18 | 26 | 44 | 66 | — | — | — | — | — |
| 1985–86 | Seattle Thunderbirds | WHL | 54 | 17 | 25 | 42 | 72 | 5 | 1 | 3 | 4 | 10 |
| 1986–87 | Seattle Thunderbirds | WHL | 70 | 40 | 46 | 86 | 159 | — | — | — | — | — |
| 1987–88 | Colorado Rangers | IHL | 64 | 14 | 13 | 27 | 68 | 9 | 0 | 3 | 3 | 18 |
| 1988–89 | Denver Rangers | IHL | 21 | 4 | 5 | 9 | 44 | — | — | — | — | — |
| 1988–89 | Kalamazoo Wings | IHL | 45 | 9 | 16 | 25 | 57 | 1 | 0 | 0 | 0 | 5 |
| 1989–90 | Moncton Hawks | AHL | 66 | 14 | 17 | 31 | 93 | — | — | — | — | — |
| 1990–91 | Moncton Hawks | AHL | 3 | 0 | 1 | 1 | 2 | — | — | — | — | — |
| 1990–91 | Knoxville Cherokees | ECHL | 16 | 9 | 11 | 20 | 30 | 3 | 1 | 4 | 5 | 6 |
| 1991–92 | Knoxville Cherokees | ECHL | 5 | 3 | 6 | 9 | 11 | — | — | — | — | — |
| 1992–93 | Flint Bulldogs | CoHL | 43 | 27 | 21 | 48 | 61 | — | — | — | — | — |
| 1993–94 | Utica Bulldogs | CoHL | 10 | 3 | 5 | 8 | 21 | — | — | — | — | — |
| 1993–94 | Flint Generals | CoHL | 26 | 10 | 24 | 34 | 67 | 10 | 4 | 2 | 6 | 28 |
| 1994–95 | Flint Generals | CoHL | 15 | 0 | 7 | 7 | 37 | — | — | — | — | — |
| 1995–96 | Detroit Falcons | CoHL | 1 | 0 | 0 | 0 | 2 | — | — | — | — | — |
| 1995–96 | Huntsville Channel Cats | SHL-Sr. | 9 | 4 | 3 | 7 | 38 | 10 | 7 | 4 | 11 | 32 |
| 1995–96 | Mexico City Torreros | NAL | — | — | — | — | — | — | — | — | — | — |
| AHL totals | | | 69 | 14 | 18 | 32 | 95 | — | — | — | — | — |
| ECHL totals | | | 21 | 12 | 17 | 29 | 41 | 3 | 1 | 4 | 5 | 6 |
| IHL totals | | | 130 | 27 | 34 | 61 | 169 | 10 | 0 | 3 | 3 | 23 |
| CoHL totals | | | 95 | 40 | 57 | 97 | 188 | 10 | 4 | 2 | 6 | 28 |
