= Dave Cameron (ice hockey) =

Canadian ice hockey player (born 1958)

- Born: July 29, 1958 (age 68) Charlottetown, Prince Edward Island, Canada
- Height: 6 ft 0 in (183 cm)
- Weight: 185 lb (84 kg; 13 st 3 lb)
- Position: Centre
- Shot: Left
- Played for: Colorado Rockies; New Jersey Devils
- Coached for: Ottawa Senators
- NHL draft: 135th overall, 1978; New York Islanders
- Playing career: 1979–1984
- Coaching career: 1995–2016

David William Cameron (born July 29, 1958) is a Canadian professional ice hockey coach and former professional player. He is currently the head coach of the Ottawa 67's of the Ontario Hockey League. He was previously the head coach of the Vienna Capitals of the Erste Bank Eishockey Liga (EBEL) and the head coach of the Ottawa Senators of the National Hockey League (NHL) from December 2014 until the conclusion of the 2015–16 season. He also played in the NHL as a forward with the Colorado Rockies and New Jersey Devils between 1981 and 1984.

Cameron has been involved in coaching in ice hockey since the mid-1990s. From 1995 to 1997, he was head coach of the Detroit Falcons/Port Huron Border Cats franchise in the Colonial Hockey League. He then joined the Ontario Hockey League (OHL) as head coach of the Sault Ste. Marie Greyhounds from 1997 to 1999, followed by being head coach of the Toronto St. Michael's Majors from 2000 to 2004. Cameron joined the American Hockey League (AHL) in 2004 when he became head coach of the Binghamton Senators until 2007, when he returned to the OHL as head coach of the Mississauga St. Michael's Majors until 2011. He then joined the NHL's Ottawa Senators as an assistant coach when Paul MacLean became the team's new head coach, and remained in that position until becoming head coach himself in December 2014.

Cameron has also coached in the international setting, including leading the Canada men's national under-18 ice hockey team to gold at the 2004 U-18 Junior World Cup.

== Playing career ==
Cameron played university hockey with the University of Prince Edward Island from 1976 to 1979, during which he recorded 27 goals and 62 assists (89 points) in 49 games with the Panthers ice hockey team. He was drafted by the New York Islanders in the eighth round of the 1978 NHL entry draft.

After completing his university career, Cameron split the 1979–80 season between the Fort Wayne Komets of the International Hockey League and the Indianapolis Checkers of the Central Hockey League (CHL). In six games with the Komets, Cameron had three goals and six assists (nine points), and in 70 games with the Checkers, Cameron had 15 goals and 21 assists (36 points). In the playoffs, he had no points in seven games with Indianapolis.

Cameron returned to the Checkers for the 1980–81 season, where he had a breakout season, scoring 40 goals and 30 assists (70 points) in 78 games, along with 156 penalty minutes. In five playoff games, Cameron had two goals and three assists. On October 1, 1981, the Islanders traded Cameron and Bob Lorimer to the Colorado Rockies in exchange for the Rockies' first-round draft pick in the 1983 NHL entry draft, which the Islanders used to select future Hockey Hall of Famer Pat LaFontaine.

Cameron spent the 1981–82 season with the Rockies, save for two games with the Fort Worth Texans of the CHL. With Colorado, Cameron recorded 11 goals and 12 assists (23 points) in 66 games as the club failed to qualify for the 1982 Stanley Cup playoffs. During the subsequent off-season, the Rockies franchise was relocated to East Rutherford, New Jersey, to become the New Jersey Devils.

Cameron struggled in his second NHL season, as appeared in 35 games with the New Jersey Devils in 1982–83, scoring five goals and four assists (nine points). Cameron also spent time with the Wichita Wind of the CHL, scoring 6 goals and 9 assists (15 points) in 25 games.

Cameron spent the entire 1983–84 season with the Devils, scoring 9 goals and 12 assists (21 points) in a career-high 67 games.

Cameron split the 1984–85 season with the Maine Mariners and the Moncton Golden Flames of the American Hockey League (AHL), where he had 8 goals and 17 assists (25 points) in 49 games. After the season, he went back home and played with the Charlottetown Islanders and Fredericton Alpines of the NBSHL. During the 1994–95 season, Cameron made a one-game appearance with the Saint John Flames of the AHL.

== Coaching career ==
=== Detroit Falcons/Port Huron Border Cats (1995–1997) ===
In 1995, Cameron was named as the head coach of the Detroit Falcons of the Colonial Hockey League. In his first season with the club, the Falcons went 33–32–9, finishing in third place in the East Division. In the first round of the playoffs, the Falcons upset the West Division winning Muskegon Fury in five games, however, Detroit lost in five games against the Flint Generals.

In 1996, the Falcons relocated and became the Port Huron Border Cats to start the 1996–97 season. The Border Cats record improved to 38–31–5, which placed them once again in third place in the East Division. In the playoffs, Port Huron lost in five games to the Brantford Smoke in the first round.

=== Sault Ste. Marie Greyhounds (1997–1999) ===
Cameron then moved to the Ontario Hockey League (OHL), as he became the head coach of the Sault Ste. Marie Greyhounds. In his first season with the club in 1997–98, the rebuilding team struggled, as they finished with a 20–39–7 record, earning 47 points and missing the playoffs.

In 1998–99, the Greyhounds improved to a 31–29–8 record, earning 70 points and sixth place in the Western Conference. Sault Ste. Marie was eliminated by the Owen Sound Platers in the first round in five games.

=== St. John's Maple Leafs (1999–2000) ===
Cameron moved on to the AHL's St. John's Maple Leafs as an assistant to head coach Al MacAdam in 1999–2000. In his only season with the Maple Leafs, the club had a league-worst 23–45–8–4 record, earning only 58 points as St. John's finished well out of a playoff spot.

=== Toronto St. Michael's Majors (2000–2004) ===
Cameron returned to the OHL in 2000 as head coach of the Toronto St. Michael's Majors. In his first season with the team in 2000–01, the Majors improved by 38 points, as they went 35–23–8–2 and made the playoffs for the first time since the rebirth of the team in 1997. St. Michael's defeated the Peterborough Petes in seven games in the first round, followed by another thrilling seven-game series win in the second round against the Sudbury Wolves. The Majors then fell in four-straight against the Ottawa 67's in the Eastern Conference Finals.

St. Michael's continued to improve in 2001–02, as the team finished with a 40–19–8–1 record to earn an Eastern Conference best 89 points. The Majors quickly swept the North Bay Centennials in the first round, then defeated the Ottawa 67's in the second round in seven games. St. Michael's then lost in the Eastern Conference Finals for the second-straight year, as the Barrie Colts swept the Majors in four games.

In 2002–03, the Majors slipped to fourth place in the Eastern Conference, as they had a 32–24–7–5 record, earning 76 points. In the first round of the playoffs, St. Michael's defeated the Belleville Bulls in a close seven-game series, followed by a five-game upset against the second-seeded Brampton Battalion in the second round to advance to the Eastern Conference Finals for the third consecutive season. St. Michael's pushed the Ottawa 67's on the brink of elimination with a 6–2 win Game 5 to take a 3–2 series lead, however Ottawa hung on for a 3–2 overtime win in Game 6, followed by a 5–2 Ottawa victory in Game 7 as the Majors were eliminated in the Conference Finals for the third-straight season.

In Cameron's fourth season with the club in 2003–04, the Majors had the best record in the Eastern Conference for the second time in three seasons, going 38–21–7–2, registering 85 points. St. Michael's survived a scare from the eighth-seeded Sudbury Wolves, winning in seven games. The Majors comfortably defeated the Brampton Battalion in five games in the second round to reach the Eastern Conference Finals for the fourth-straight year, facing the Mississauga IceDogs. The IceDogs eliminated St. Michael's in six games.

=== Binghamton Senators (2004–2007) ===
After four successful seasons with the Majors, Cameron became head coach of the AHL's Binghamton Senators. The Senators saw a 26-point improvement in Cameron's first season with the team, finishing in first place in the East Division with a 47–21–7–5 record (106 points). In the first round of the 2005 Calder Cup playoffs, the Senators were upset by the Wilkes-Barre/Scranton Penguins in six games.

With many Binghamton players promoted to the NHL's Ottawa Senators for the 2005–06 season following the end of the 2004–05 NHL lockout, the club struggled and finished with a 35–37–4–4 record, missing the playoffs by finishing in fifth place in the East Division, seven points behind the Bridgeport Sound Tigers.

Binghamton's struggles continued in 2006–07, finishing with the worst record in the AHL at 23–48–4–5 (55 points), well out of a playoff position. It also stood as the worst record in franchise history, with fans in Binghamton regularly chanting for Cameron's firing during home games throughout the season.

=== Mississauga St. Michael's Majors (2007–2011) ===
After a three-year stint with Binghamton, Cameron returned to the Majors organization, which during the summer of 2007 had relocated from Toronto to Mississauga to become the Mississauga St. Michael's Majors. In his first season, 2007–08, the Majors saw a 20-point improvement, as they went 31–32–2–3 (67 points) to finish in fifth place in the Eastern Conference. In the opening round of the playoffs, the Majors were swept in four games by the Niagara IceDogs.

Mississauga continued to improve in 2008–09, as they improved by 14 points with a 39–26–1–2 record (81 points) and a fourth-place finish in the Eastern Conference. The Majors defeated the Barrie Colts in five games in the first round but were eliminated in six games in the second round by the Brampton Battalion.

The Majors saw their point total increase again in 2009–10, as the club had a record of 42–20–4–2 (90 points) to finish in third place in the Eastern Conference. Mississauga swept the Peterborough Petes in four games in the opening round, then eliminated the Ottawa 67's in seven games in the second round. In the Eastern Conference Finals, the Majors were eliminated in five games by the Barrie Colts.

In 2010–11, the Majors were named hosts of the 2011 Memorial Cup. St. Michael's recorded an OHL-best record of 53–13–0–2 record (108 points) to win the Hamilton Spectator Trophy. In the playoffs, the Majors swept the Belleville Bulls in the first round (allowing just one goal against), swept the Sudbury Wolves in the second round, then eliminated the Niagara IceDogs in the Eastern Conference Finals in five games to win the Bobby Orr Trophy as Eastern Conference champions. In the J. Ross Robertson Cup final against the Owen Sound Attack, the Attack won the series through an overtime goal in Game 7.

In the 2011 Memorial Cup, St. Michael's finished 2–1 in the round-robin to advance to the semi-finals. In the semi-final game, the Majors defeated the Western Hockey League's Kootenay Ice 3–1 to advance to the final game against the Quebec Major Junior Hockey League's Saint John Sea Dogs. The Sea Dogs won the game 3–1 to win the Memorial Cup.

=== Ottawa Senators (2011–2016) ===
In 2011, Cameron and Mark Reeds joined the staff of Paul MacLean with the Ottawa Senators as assistant coaches. Cameron became the Senators' head coach in December 2014 after former general manager (GM) Bryan Murray announced MacLean's firing on December 8, making Cameron the fifth head coach of the team since June 2007. With a strong performance by rookie goaltender Andrew Hammond and forward Mark Stone, the Senators would win 23 of their final 31 games of the regular season, allowing the Senators to qualify for the 2015 Stanley Cup playoffs. The Senators would lose in the first round to the Montreal Canadiens in six games.

Cameron remained as head coach of the Senators for the 2015–16 season. However, the Senators would finish the season eight points out of a wild card spot to miss the 2016 playoffs. On March 22, 2016, Senators owner Eugene Melnyk expressed his disappointment with the team, including Cameron's decision to have backup goaltender Matt O'Connor start the first home game against Montreal, which Ottawa lost. On April 10, 2016, Murray announced that he was resigning as GM and that assistant GM Pierre Dorion would be replacing him. Two days later, Cameron was fired, along with assistant coaches André Tourigny and Rick Wamsley; assistant coach Jason Smith was offered another role in the organization. Cameron finished with a record of 70–50–17 with the Senators.

=== Calgary Flames (2016–2018) ===
On July 6, 2016, Cameron was hired by the Calgary Flames to be an assistant coach on Glen Gulutzan's staff. Cameron was fired on April 17, 2018, when Gulutzan was fired.

=== Vienna Capitals (2018–2021) ===
In May 2018, Cameron became the head coach of Vienna Capitals of the Austrian Erste Bank Eishockey Liga. He replaced Serge Aubin, who became head coach of Swiss club ZSC Lions.

=== International ===
Cameron was an assistant coach for the Canada men's national under-18 ice hockey team for the 2003 U-18 Junior World Cup held in Slovenia, in which Canada finished fourth. Cameron returned as head coach of the team for the 2004 U-18 Junior World Cup (also held in Slovenia), leading Canada to the gold medal.

Cameron was the head coach for Canada's men's national junior ice hockey team during the 2011 World Junior Ice Hockey Championships in Buffalo, New York, where the team earned the silver medal after losing 5–3 to Russia in the tournament finals. Cameron was an assistant coach for Canada's men's national ice hockey team at the 2016 IIHF World Championship in Russia, with Bill Peters being the team's head coach. On July 21, 2021, he was named the head coach for Team Canada for the 2022 World Junior Ice Hockey Championships, replacing André Tourigny.

== Personal life ==
Cameron was born in Charlottetown, Prince Edward Island, and grew up in Albany, Prince Edward Island and Kinkora, Prince Edward Island.

After his playing career was over, Cameron returned to university to finish his business degree. He went into business with the Bank of Nova Scotia before becoming a guidance counsellor.

Cameron and his wife Kelly live in Nepean. He also has two boys, Connor and Ben.

== Career statistics ==
=== Regular season and playoffs ===
			Regular season					Playoffs
Season	Team	League	GP	G	A	Pts	PIM	GP	G	A	Pts	PIM
1976–77	University of Prince Edward Island	CIAU	20	7	10	17	12	—	—	—	—	—
1977–78	University of Prince Edward Island	CIAU	16	13	30	43	26	—	—	—	—	—
1978–79	University of Prince Edward Island	CIAU	16	13	30	43	26	—	—	—	—	—
1979–80	Fort Wayne Komets	IHL	6	3	6	9	9	—	—	—	—	—
1979–80	Indianapolis Checkers	CHL	70	15	21	36	101	7	0	0	0	16
1980–81	Indianapolis Checkers	CHL	78	40	30	70	156	5	2	3	5	4
1981–82	Colorado Rockies	NHL	66	11	12	23	103	—	—	—	—	—
1981–82	Fort Worth Texans	CHL	2	0	0	0	0	—	—	—	—	—
1982–83	New Jersey Devils	NHL	35	5	4	9	50	—	—	—	—	—
1982–83	Wichita Wind	CHL	25	6	9	15	40	—	—	—	—	—
1983–84	New Jersey Devils	NHL	67	9	12	21	85	—	—	—	—	—
1984–85	Maine Mariners	AHL	12	0	1	1	32	—	—	—	—	—
1984–85	Moncton Golden Flames	AHL	37	8	16	24	82	—	—	—	—	—
1985–86	Charlottetown Islanders	NBSHL	15	9	16	25	54	—	—	—	—	—
1986–87	Charlottetown Islanders	NBSHL	11	5	17	22	69	—	—	—	—	—
1989–90	Fredericton Alpines	NBSHL	14	0	8	8	30	6	1	6	7	—
1990–91	Charlottetown Islanders	NBSHL	25	23	21	44	69	—	—	—	—	—
1994–95	Saint John Flames	AHL	1	0	0	0	0	—	—	—	—	—
NHL totals			168	25	28	53	238	—	—	—	—	—

== Coaching record ==
=== NHL ===
Team	Year	Regular season						Postseason			
Team	Year	G	W	L	OTL	Pts	Finish	W	L	Win %	Result
OTT	2014–15	55	32	15	8	(99)	4th in Atlantic	2	4	.333	Lost in first round (MTL)
OTT	2015–16	82	38	35	9	85	5th in Atlantic	—	—	—	Did not qualify
Total		137	70	50	17	—		2	4	.333	1 playoff appearance

=== Ontario Hockey League ===
Team	Year	Regular season							Postseason
Team	Year	G	W	L	T	OTL	Pts	Finish	Result
SSM	1997–98	66	20	39	7	-	47	5th in Western	Missed Playoffs
SSM	1998–99	68	31	29	8	-	70	4th in West	Lost in conference quarter-finals (1-4 vs. OS)
TOR	2000–01	68	35	23	8	2	80	2nd in Central	Won in conference quarter-finals (4-3 vs. PBO); Won in conference semi-finals (4-3 vs. SBY); Lost in conference finals (0-4 vs. OTT)
TOR	2001–02	68	40	19	8	1	89	1st in Central	Won in conference quarter-finals (4-0 vs. NB); Won in conference semi-finals (4-3 vs. OTT); Lost in conference finals (0-4 vs. BAR)
TOR	2002–03	68	32	24	7	5	76	2nd in Central	Won in conference quarter-finals (4-3 vs. BEL); Won in conference semi-finals (4-1 vs. BRA); Lost in conference finals (3-4 vs. OTT)
TOR	2003–04	68	38	21	7	2	85	1st in Central	Won in conference quarter-finals (4-3 vs. SBY); Won in conference semi-finals (4-1 vs. BRA); Lost in conference finals (2-4 vs. MIS)
MIS	2007–08	68	31	32	-	5	67	3rd in Central	Lost in conference quarter-finals (0-4 vs. NIA)
MIS	2008–09	68	39	26	-	3	81	2nd in Central	Won in conference quarter-finals (4-1 vs. BAR); Lost in conference semi-finals (2-4 vs. BRA)
MIS	2009–10	68	42	20	-	6	90	2nd in Central	Won in conference quarter-finals (4-0 vs. PBO); Won in conference semi-finals (4-3 vs. OTT); Lost in conference finals (1-4 vs. BAR)
MIS	2010–11	68	53	13	-	2	108	1st in Central	Won in conference quarter-finals (4-0 vs. BAR); Won in conference semi-finals (4-0 vs. SBY); Won in conference finals (4-1 vs. NIA); Lost in J. Ross Robertson Cup finals (3-4 vs. OS); Finished second in round-robin at Memorial Cup (2-1); Won Memorial Cup semi-finals (3-1 vs. KOO); Lost Memorial Cup finals (1-3 vs. SJ)
OTT	2021–22	68	28	31	-	9	65	4th in East	Lost in OHL quarter-finals, (0-4 vs. NB)
OTT	2022–23	68	51	12	-	5	107	1st in East	Won in conference quarter-finals (4-1 vs. OSH); Lost in conference semi-finals (2-4 vs. PBO)
OTT	2023–24	68	36	24	-	8	80	6th in East	Won in conference quarter-finals (4-2 vs. BFD); Lost in conference semi-finals (0-4 vs. OSH)
OTT	2024–25	68	24	34	-	10	58	9th in East	Missed Playoffs
OTT	2025–26	68	47	15	-	6	100	3rd in East	Won in conference quarter-finals (4-0 vs. KGN); Lost in conference semi-finals (1-4 vs. BAR)
Total		1018	547	362	45	64	2170	4 Division Titles	0 J. Ross Robertson Cups (83-77, 0.519) 0 Memorial Cups (3-2, 0.600)

=== American Hockey League ===
Team	Year	Regular season							Postseason
Team	Year	G	W	L	T	OTL	Pts	Finish	Result
BNG	2004–05	80	47	21	-	12	106	1st in East	Lost in division semi-finals (2-4 vs. WBS)
BNG	2005–06	80	35	37	-	8	78	5th in East	Missed Playoffs
BNG	2006–07	80	23	48	-	9	55	7th in East	Missed Playoffs
Total		240	105	106	-	29	239	1 Division Title	0 Calder Cups (2-4, 0.333)

=== Colonial Hockey League ===
Team	Year	Regular season							Postseason
Team	Year	G	W	L	T	OTL	Pts	Finish	Result
DET	1995–96	74	33	32	-	9	75	3rd in East	Won in CoHL quarter-finals (4-1 vs. MUS); Lost in CoHL semi-finals (1-4 vs. FLI)
PHB	1996–97	74	38	31	-	5	81	3rd in East	Lost in CoHL quarter-finals (2-3 vs. BFD)
Total		148	71	63	-	14	156	0 Division Titles	0 Colonial Cups (7-8, 0.467)

Preceded by Paul MacLean	Head coach of the Ottawa Senators; 2014–2016	Succeeded by Guy Boucher
