= Huber Trophy =

The Huber Trophy (formerly known as the Tarry Cup) is the trophy awarded annually to the team that finishes the Colonial/United/International Hockey League regular season with the best overall record, as determined by points earned in the standings.

The regular season championship award was first presented in 1991–92. It was renamed the Tarry Cup in 1994 in memory of Doug Tarry, who was the owner of the St. Thomas Wildcats, a charter member of the CoHL. On September 24, 2007, the trophy was given its current name in honor of the founder of the original International Hockey League, Fred Huber, which was awarded to the original league's regular-season champion.

== Winners ==
- 2007–08 — Fort Wayne Komets
- 2006–07 — Fort Wayne Komets
- 2005–06 — Kalamazoo Wings
- 2004–05 — Muskegon Fury
- 2003–04 — Fort Wayne Komets
- 2002–03 — Fort Wayne Komets
- 2001–02 — Quad City Mallards
- 2000–01 — Quad City Mallards
- 1999–00 — Quad City Mallards
- 1998–99 — Muskegon Fury
- 1997–98 — Quad City Mallards
- 1996–97 — Flint Generals
- 1995–96 — Flint Generals
- 1994–95 — Thunder Bay Senators
- 1993v94 — Thunder Bay Senators
- 1992–93 — Brantford Smoke
- 1991–92 — Michigan Falcons
