= List of Kalamazoo Wings seasons =

Kalamazoo Wings All-Time Season List

This is a list of seasons completed by the Kalamazoo Wings in the teams' history starting from their initial season in 2000–01.

Season	GP	W	L	T/OTL	Pts	GF	GA	Pct	Regular season finish	Playoffs
United Hockey League
2000–01	74	37	31	6	80	220	220	.541	3rd Southwest, 9th of 15	Lost Play-in game vs. Muskegon Fury
2001–02	74	27	37	8	66	213	277	.446	6th Western, 11th of 14	did not qualify
2002–03	76	29	39	8	66	210	282	.434	5th Western, 10th of 10	did not qualify
2003–04	76	45	22	9	99	281	207	.651	4th Western, 4th of 12	Lost Quarterfinal series vs. Fort Wayne Komets, 2–3
2004–05	80	50	24	6	100	257	204	.663	2nd Central, 3rd of 14	Lost Semifinal series vs. Fort Wayne Komets, 3–4
2005–06	76	52	17	7	111	332	183	.730	1st Central, 1st of 14	Won Colonial Cup Final series vs. Danbury Trashers, 4–1
2006–07	76	47	23	6	100	251	191	.658	2nd Eastern, 4th of 10	Lost Colonial Cup Final series vs. Rockford IceHogs, 3–4
International Hockey League
2007–08	76	31	34	11	73	242	252	.480	5th of 6 IHL	did not qualify
2008–09	76	44	29	3	91	274	253	.599	4th of 6 IHL	Lost Semifinal series vs. Fort Wayne Komets, 3–4
ECHL
2009–10	72	42	20	10	94	273	243	.653	1st North, 3rd of 20	Lost Quarterfinal series vs. Reading Royals, 2–3
2010–11	72	40	24	8	88	255	225	.611	1st North, 4th of 19	Lost Kelly Cup Final series vs. Alaska Aces, 1–4
2011–12	72	38	26	8	84	264	237	.583	1st North, 8th of 20	Lost Eastern Conference Final series vs. Florida Everblades, 1–4
2012–13	72	34	30	8	76	205	215	.528	3rd North, 14th of 23	did not qualify
2013–14	72	42	22	8	92	224	197	.639	1st North, 4th of 21	Lost Quarterfinal series vs. Greenville Road Warriors, 2–4
2014–15	72	36	30	6	78	226	233	.542	3rd North, 16th of 28	Lost Division Semifinal series vs. Fort Wayne Komets, 1–4
2015–16	72	38	28	6	82	233	230	.569	3rd North, 13th of 28	Lost Conference Quarterfinal series vs. South Carolina Stingrays, 1–4
2016–17	72	38	30	4	80	222	237	.556	4th Central, 15th of 27	Lost Division Semifinal series vs. Toledo Walleye, 3–4
2017–18	72	34	31	7	75	251	251	.521	5th Central, 16th of 27	did not qualify
2018–19	72	36	31	5	77	229	254	.535	4th Central, 15th of 27	Lost Division Semifinal series vs. Cincinnati Cyclones, 2–4
2019–20	61	23	30	8	54	194	241	.443	5th Central, 22nd of 26	Season cancelled
2020–21	Opted out of participating due to the COVID-19 pandemic									
2021–22	72	36	35	1	73	224	255	.507	5th Central, 19th of 27	did not qualify
2022–23	72	29	37	6	64	178	226	.444	5th Central, 23rd of 28	did not qualify
2023–24	72	38	30	4	80	214	203	.556	4th Central, 13th of 27	Lost Division Semifinal vs. Toledo Walleye, 0–4
2024–25	72	31	33	8	70	201	229	.486	5th Central, 14th of 29	did not qualify
2025–26	72	36	30	6	78	228	246	.542	5th Central, 15th of 30	did not qualify
