= Todd Charlesworth =

Canadian ice hockey player (born 1965)

- Born: March 22, 1965 (age 60) Calgary, Alberta, Canada
- Height: 6 ft 1 in (185 cm)
- Weight: 190 lb (86 kg; 13 st 8 lb)
- Position: Defenseman
- Shot: Left
- Played for: Pittsburgh Penguins; New York Rangers
- NHL draft: 22nd overall, 1983; Pittsburgh Penguins
- Playing career: 1983–1995

Todd Charlesworth (born March 22, 1965) is a Canadian former professional ice hockey defenceman. He played 93 games in the NHL for the Pittsburgh Penguins and the New York Rangers between 1984 and 1990.

== Career statistics ==
=== Regular season and playoffs ===
			Regular season					Playoffs
Season	Team	League	GP	G	A	Pts	PIM	GP	G	A	Pts	PIM
1981–82	Gloucester Rangers	CJHL	50	13	24	37	67	—	—	—	—	—
1982–83	Oshawa Generals	OHL	70	6	23	29	55	17	0	4	4	20
1982–83	Oshawa Generals	M-Cup	—	—	—	—	—	5	1	3	4	2
1983–84	Pittsburgh Penguins	NHL	10	0	0	0	8	—	—	—	—	—
1983–84	Oshawa Generals	OHL	57	11	35	46	54	7	0	4	4	4
1984–85	Pittsburgh Penguins	NHL	67	1	8	9	31	—	—	—	—	—
1985–86	Baltimore Skipjacks	AHL	19	1	3	4	10	—	—	—	—	—
1985–86	Pittsburgh Penguins	NHL	2	0	1	1	0	—	—	—	—	—
1985–86	Muskegon Lumberjacks	IHL	51	9	27	36	78	14	3	8	11	14
1986–87	Pittsburgh Penguins	NHL	1	0	0	0	0	—	—	—	—	—
1986–87	Baltimore Skipjacks	AHL	75	5	21	26	64	—	—	—	—	—
1987–88	Pittsburgh Penguins	NHL	6	2	0	2	2	—	—	—	—	—
1987–88	Muskegon Lumberjacks	IHL	64	9	31	40	49	5	0	0	0	18
1988–89	Muskegon Lumberjacks	IHL	74	10	53	63	85	14	2	13	15	8
1989–90	Cape Breton Oilers	AHL	32	0	9	9	13	—	—	—	—	—
1989–90	New York Rangers	NHL	7	0	0	0	6	—	—	—	—	—
1989–90	Flint Spirits	IHL	26	3	6	9	12	4	0	0	0	4
1990–91	Muskegon Lumberjacks	IHL	62	5	32	37	46	5	1	3	4	2
1990–91	Binghamton Rangers	AHL	11	0	3	3	2	—	—	—	—	—
1992–93	Muskegon Fury	CoHL	45	9	37	46	22	7	1	3	4	4
1993–94	Muskegon Fury	CoHL	37	8	30	38	33	3	0	1	1	0
1994–95	Muskegon Fury	CoHL	62	21	49	70	60	17	1	14	15	12
IHL totals			277	36	149	185	270	38	6	24	30	42
NHL totals			93	3	9	12	47	—	—	—	—	—
