= Derek Landmesser =

Canadian ice hockey player and coach

- Born: January 27, 1975 (age 51) Thunder Bay, Ontario, Canada
- Height: 6 ft 1 in (185 cm)
- Weight: 201 lb (91 kg; 14 st 5 lb)
- Position: Defence
- Shot: Right
- Played for: CoHL/UHL; Thunder Bay Thunder Cats; Rockford IceHogs; Muskegon Fury; IHL; Manitoba Moose; CHL; Memphis / Mississippi Riverkings; AHL; Toronto Marlies
- NHL draft: Undrafted
- Playing career: 1996–2011

Derek Landmesser (born January 27, 1975) is a Canadian former professional ice hockey player and coach who most recently served as the head coach of the Southern Professional Hockey League’s (SPHL) Mississippi RiverKings.

== Career ==
Landmesser started his professional career as a defenceman in 1996 with his hometown team, the Thunder Bay Thunder Cats in Colonial Hockey League. He played 15 seasons of professional hockey, including 10 seasons in the Central Hockey League (CHL) where he played 627 regular season games, scoring 563 points from the blue line. He was named the CHL's most outstanding defenceman for the 2000–01 CHL season and was named to the All-CHL Team three times.

Landmesser retired as a player following the 2010–11 CHL season, and on August 1, 2011, Landmesser was announced as the new head coach of the Mississippi RiverKings. On May 24, 2018, the RiverKings ceased operations.

== Career statistics ==
			Regular season					Playoffs
Season	Team	League	GP	G	A	Pts	PIM	GP	G	A	Pts	PIM
1996–97	Thunder Bay Thunder Cats	CoHL	17	0	3	3	11	—	—	—	—	—
1997–98	Thunder Bay Thunder Cats	UHL	73	2	19	21	80	5	1	1	2	2
1998–99	Thunder Bay Thunder Cats	UHL	72	7	36	43	180	13	3	3	6	26
1998–99	Manitoba Moose	IHL	1	0	0	0	0	—	—	—	—	—
1999–00	Rockford IceHogs	UHL	55	10	27	37	95	3	1	4	5	4
1999–00	Manitoba Moose	IHL	10	0	0	0	4	—	—	—	—	—
2000–01	Memphis RiverKings	CHL	59	7	41	48	121	7	2	5	7	24
2001–02	Muskegon Fury	UHL	74	20	44	64	48	17	4	11	15	18
2002–03	Memphis RiverKings	CHL	63	13	44	57	151	14	1	9	10	28
2003–04	Memphis RiverKings	CHL	64	7	48	55	83	—	—	—	—	—
2004–05	Memphis RiverKings	CHL	59	10	56	66	102	—	—	—	—	—
2005–06	Memphis RiverKings	CHL	62	17	64	81	125	—	—	—	—	—
2005–06	Toronto Marlies	AHL	3	0	0	0	0	—	—	—	—	—
2006–07	Memphis RiverKings	CHL	64	12	50	62	100	18	6	12	18	18
2007–08	Mississippi RiverKings	CHL	64	8	42	50	57	3	0	2	2	4
2008–09	Mississippi RiverKings	CHL	63	6	45	51	74	12	0	9	9	18
2009–10	Mississippi RiverKings	CHL	63	11	40	51	67	3	0	1	1	0
2010–11	Mississippi RiverKings	CHL	66	10	32	42	73	5	0	3	3	6
CHL totals			627	101	462	563	953	62	9	41	50	98
UHL totals			291	39	129	168	414	38	9	19	28	50

== Awards and honours ==
Award	Year
CHL Most Outstanding Defenceman	2000–01
CHL All-CHL Team	2004–05
CHL All-CHL Team	2005–06
CHL All-CHL Team	2006–07
