= Steve Walker =

Canadian ice hockey player and coach (born 1973)

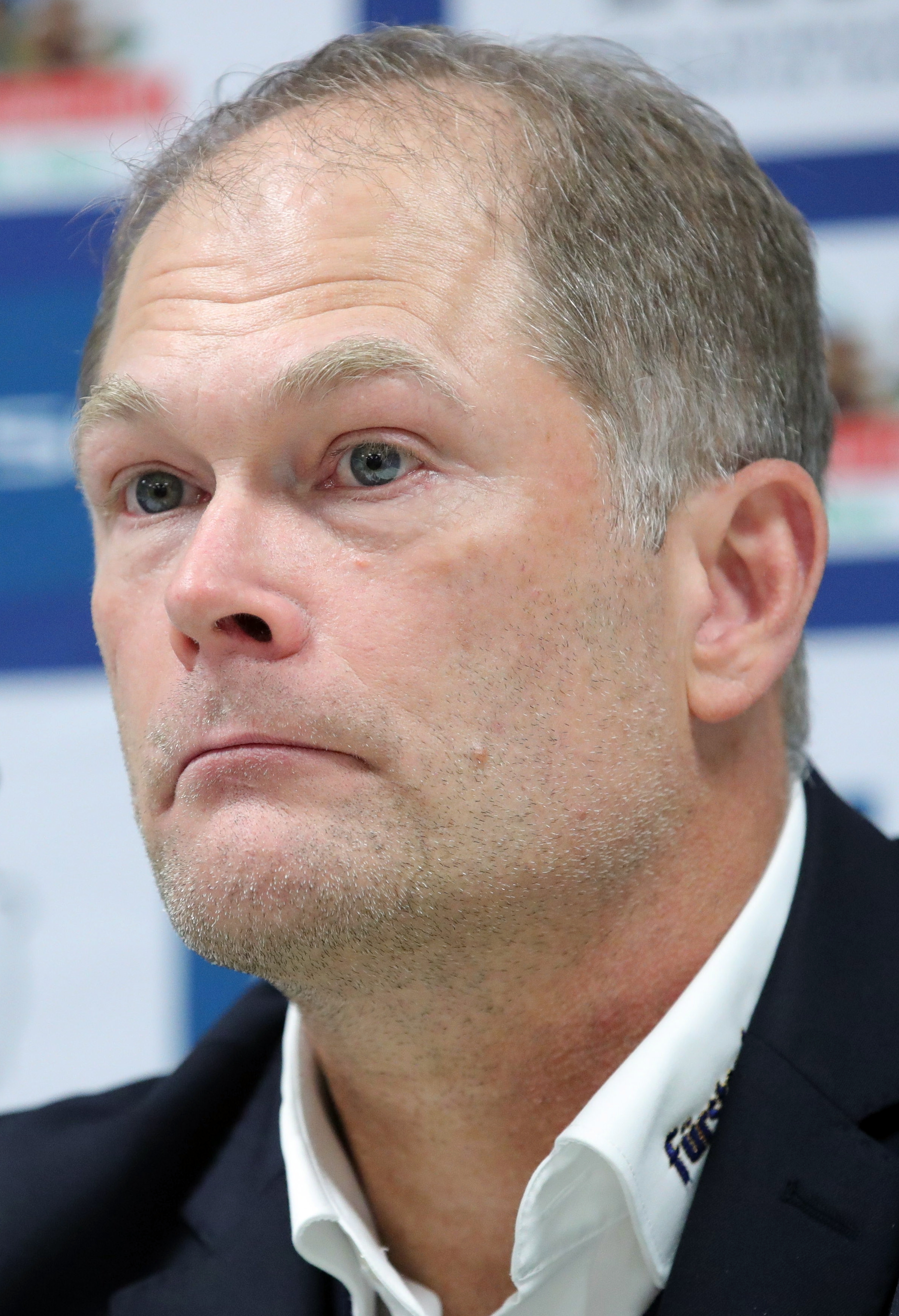
- Born: January 12, 1973 (age 53) Collingwood, Ontario, Canada
- Height: 6 ft 0 in (183 cm)
- Weight: 190 lb (86 kg; 13 st 8 lb)
- Position: Left wing
- Shot: Left
- DEL team: Eisbären Berlin
- Playing career: 1993–2011

Steve Walker (born January 12, 1973) is a Canadian ice hockey coach and former professional ice hockey player. He is currently serving as head coach of Schwenninger Wild Wings in the Deutsche Eishockey Liga (DEL).

== Playing career ==
Born in Collingwood, Ontario, Walker played junior hockey for the Stayner Siskins, Owen Sound Platers and the Barrie Colts before turning pro in 1993, playing nine games for the ECHL's Wheeling Thunderbirds. Walker then spent two seasons in the Colonial Hockey League with the Muskegon Fury, scoring 43 goals and 57 assists for 100 points in the 1995-96 season. He split the 1996-97 season in the Colonial Hockey League with the Flint Generals, the American Hockey League for the Rochester Americans and the International Hockey League with the Detroit Vipers where he would spend another three seasons.

In 2000, Walker joined Eisbären Berlin, a member of the Deutsche Eishockey Liga in Germany and remained with the team until 2011. He made 593 DEL appearances for the Eisbären team, tallying 213 goals and 379 assists. He captured five German championship titles with Berlin and had his jersey retired on December 26, 2014.

== Coaching career ==
From January 2013 to 2015, he served as head coach of the Stayner Siskins, a member of the Georgian Mid-Ontario Junior C Hockey League.

On August 5, 2015, Walker was appointed as assistant coach of German club Adler Mannheim. He ended his two-year tenure in 2017 and took over the head coaching job at EC KAC in the Austrian Hockey League.

== Career statistics ==
			Regular season					Playoffs
Season	Team	League	GP	G	A	Pts	PIM	GP	G	A	Pts	PIM
1990–91	Owen Sound Platers	OHL	16	1	5	6	4	—	—	—	—	—
1991–92	Owen Sound Platers	OHL	9	2	3	5	2	—	—	—	—	—
1992–93	Barrie Colts	CJAHL	48	75	76	151	45	—	—	—	—	—
1993–94	Wheeling Thunderbirds	ECHL	9	1	0	1	2	—	—	—	—	—
1993–94	Bonnyville Pontiacs	AJHL	42	39	53	92	63	—	—	—	—	—
1994–95	Muskegon Fury	CoHL	72	20	26	46	42	17	7	9	16	6
1995–96	Muskegon Fury	CoHL	69	43	57	100	121	5	2	4	6	0
1996–97	Flint Generals	CoHL	16	13	16	29	34	—	—	—	—	—
1996–97	Detroit Vipers	IHL	54	12	12	24	27	20	10	9	19	8
1996–97	Rochester Americans	AHL	3	0	0	0	17	—	—	—	—	—
1997–98	Detroit Vipers	IHL	78	27	49	76	53	23	7	9	16	13
1998–99	Detroit Vipers	IHL	80	25	32	57	72	11	1	4	5	4
1999–2000	Detroit Vipers	IHL	76	15	31	46	67	—	—	—	—	—
2000–01	Eisbären Berlin	DEL	59	19	39	58	32	—	—	—	—	—
2001–02	Eisbären Berlin	DEL	36	18	16	34	24	4	2	2	4	0
2002–03	Eisbären Berlin	DEL	46	21	26	47	30	9	4	5	9	6
2003–04	Eisbären Berlin	DEL	51	14	32	46	26	11	6	3	9	10
2004–05	Eisbären Berlin	DEL	51	16	30	46	57	12	6	4	10	6
2005–06	Eisbären Berlin	DEL	50	14	36	50	42	11	7	4	11	8
2006–07	Eisbären Berlin	DEL	52	14	28	42	52	3	1	1	2	2
2007–08	Eisbären Berlin	DEL	53	27	58	85	73	9	3	5	8	4
2008–09	Eisbären Berlin	DEL	49	15	36	51	52	9	2	2	4	8
2009–10	Eisbären Berlin	DEL	36	16	27	43	41	5	1	1	2	4
2010–11	Eisbären Berlin	DEL	25	5	18	23	10	12	2	6	8	2
CoHL totals			157	76	99	175	197	22	9	13	22	6
IHL totals			288	79	124	203	219	54	18	22	40	25
DEL totals			508	179	346	525	439	85	34	33	67	50
