= Lee Giffin =

Canadian ice hockey player

- Born: April 1, 1967 (age 58) Chatham, Ontario, Canada
- Height: 5 ft 11 in (180 cm)
- Weight: 200 lb (91 kg; 14 st 4 lb)
- Position: Right wing
- Shot: Right
- Played for: Pittsburgh Penguins
- National team: Canada
- NHL draft: 23rd overall, 1985; Pittsburgh Penguins
- Playing career: 1987–1999

Lee Giffin (born April 1, 1967) is a Canadian former ice hockey player. He played 27 games in the National Hockey League with the Pittsburgh Penguins during the 1986–87 and 1987–88 seasons. The rest of his career, which lasted from 1987 to 1999, was spent in the minor leagues.

== Career statistics ==
=== Regular season and playoffs ===
			Regular season					Playoffs
Season	Team	League	GP	G	A	Pts	PIM	GP	G	A	Pts	PIM
1982–83	Newmarket Flyers	OJAHL	47	10	21	31	123	—	—	—	—	—
1983–84	Oshawa Generals	OHL	70	23	27	50	88	7	1	4	5	12
1984–85	Oshawa Generals	OHL	62	36	42	78	78	5	1	2	3	2
1985–86	Oshawa Generals	OHL	54	29	37	66	28	6	0	5	5	8
1986–87	Pittsburgh Penguins	NHL	8	1	1	2	0	—	—	—	—	—
1986–87	Oshawa Generals	OHL	48	31	69	100	46	23	17	19	36	14
1986–87	Oshawa Generals	M-Cup	—	—	—	—	—	4	3	1	4	0
1987–88	Pittsburgh Penguins	NHL	19	0	2	2	9	—	—	—	—	—
1987–88	Muskegon Lumberjacks	IHL	48	26	37	63	61	6	1	3	4	2
1988–89	Muskegon Lumberjacks	IHL	63	30	44	74	93	12	5	7	12	8
1989–90	Flint Spirits	IHL	73	30	44	74	68	4	1	2	3	0
1990–91	Kansas City Blades	IHL	60	25	43	68	48	—	—	—	—	—
1990–91	Canadian National Team	Intl	5	0	2	2	2	—	—	—	—	—
1991–92	Capital District Islanders	AHL	77	19	26	45	58	7	3	3	6	18
1992–93	Chatham Wheels	CoHL	29	14	26	40	65	—	—	—	—	—
1992–93	Muskegon Fury	CoHL	—	—	—	—	—	5	6	3	9	0
1994–95	Saginaw Wheels	CoHL	13	5	7	12	13	10	2	13	15	24
1995–96	Saginaw Wheels	CoHL	58	20	47	67	94	5	1	2	3	8
1996–97	Kansas City Blades	IHL	2	0	0	0	0	—	—	—	—	—
1996–97	Mobile Mysticks	ECHL	20	7	9	16	4	3	1	0	1	0
1997–98	Mobile Mysticks	ECHL	45	16	29	45	46	3	2	0	2	0
1998–99	Mobile Mysticks	ECHL	54	16	21	37	44	2	0	1	1	24
IHL totals			246	111	168	279	270	22	7	12	19	10
NHL totals			27	1	3	4	9	—	—	—	—	—
