= Mark Laforest =

Canadian ice hockey player (1962–2025)

- Born: July 10, 1962 Welland, Ontario, Canada
- Died: March 31, 2025 (aged 62) Welland, Ontario, Canada
- Height: 5 ft 10 in (178 cm)
- Weight: 180 lb (82 kg; 12 st 12 lb)
- Position: Goaltender
- Caught: Left
- Played for: Detroit Red Wings; Philadelphia Flyers; Toronto Maple Leafs; Ottawa Senators
- NHL draft: Undrafted
- Playing career: 1983–1997

Mark Andrew Laforest (Note: Sometimes written as Mark LaForest.) (July 10, 1962–March 31, 2025) was a Canadian professional ice hockey goaltender. He played 103 games in the National Hockey League (NHL) with the Detroit Red Wings, Philadelphia Flyers, Toronto Maple Leafs, and Ottawa Senators between 1985 and 1994. He won the Calder Cup of the American Hockey League (AHL) in 1986 and twice won the Aldege "Baz" Bastien Memorial Award as the AHL's best goalie in 1987 and 1991.

After retirement, Laforest appeared at many NHL alumni events.

== Junior hockey ==
Laforest joined the Niagara Falls Flyers of the Ontario Hockey League (OHL) during the 1981–82 season as a walk-on, having gone undrafted out of minor hockey by teams of the OHL. He played in 24 games, with a record of 10 wins, 13 losses and 1 tie (10–13–1), with a single shutout and a goals against average (GAA) of 4.62. The following season the Flyers were relocated and renamed the North Bay Centennials. With the Centennials he appeared in 54 games with a record of 34–17–1 and a GAA of 3.73.

== Professional ==
=== Detroit Red Wings ===
Laforest went undrafted by teams of the National Hockey League (NHL) and became a free agent. He signed a multi-year deal with the Detroit Red Wings in May 1983 and was assigned to the American Hockey League (AHL) affiliate. Laforest split the 1983–84 season between the Adirondack Red Wings of the AHL and the Kalamazoo Wings of the International Hockey League (IHL) and between Adirondack and the Mohawk Valley Stars of the Atlantic Coast Hockey League in the 1984–85 season. He began the 1985–86 season with the team unsure of his development. However, Laforest had a strong training camp and earned a spot with Adirondack. Laforest took advantage of the opportunity, earning a record of 9–0–0 before being recalled by Detroit in relief of Greg Stefan. Laforest made his NHL debut on December 3, 1985, in a 4–1 win over the Philadelphia Flyers, saving 35 of 36 shots, letting only Dave Poulin score against him. He registered his first NHL shutout on January 28, 1986, stopping 26 shots in a 4–0 win over the Washington Capitals. He remained with Detroit until March, with a record of 4–21–0, a GAA 4.95 and a save percentage of .846. Laforest was returned to Adirondack and backstopped them to the playoffs and winning the 1986 Calder Cup championship. He signed a new contract with Detroit in the offseason.

That same offseason Detroit acquired Glen Hanlon from the New York Rangers to tend the goal alongside Stefan and Laforest returned to Adirondack for the 1986–87 season. He starred for the AHL Red Wings with a record 26–8–2 in 37 games with a GAA of 2.83 and a save percentage of .911. For his play in the AHL, Laforest won the Aldege "Baz" Bastien Memorial Award as the league's best goaltender. He was recalled by Detroit and made his season debut in the NHL on January 24, 1987, in a 5–3 loss to the St. Louis Blues with Rob Ramage scoring two of the goals against him. Laforest earned his first NHL win of the season in his next game for Detroit on January 31, a 4–2 victory over the Toronto Maple Leafs, with teammate Joe Kocur scoring twice in the third period. He played in five NHL games that season in total, going 2–1–0 with a GAA of 3.30 and a save percentage of .892. With his path blocked in Detroit by Hanlon, Stefan and prospect Sam St. Laurent, Detroit traded Laforest to the Philadelphia Flyers for a second round draft choice in the 1987 NHL entry draft.

=== Philadelphia Flyers ===
With his trade to the Flyers, Laforest was expected to compete for the backup job behind Ron Hextall. However, Hextall had been suspended for eight games to start the season and Laforest became the opening night goaltender for the Flyers. In his first game on October 8, 1987, he registered a 2–2 tie with the Montreal Canadiens. Laforest earned his first win with the Flyers in the next game on October 10, a 5–4 victory over the Minnesota North Stars. He collected his first shutout with the Flyers and the team's first shutout of the season in a 6–0 win over the Winnipeg Jets on March 26, 1988. He spent the majority of the 1987–88 season with the Flyers but played five games with the Hershey Bears of the AHL. In his second year with Philadelphia, Laforest had a record of 5–7–2 with a GAA of 4.12 in 17 games. However, the Flyers acquired goaltender Ken Wregget on March 6, 1989, and Laforest dropped on the depth chart. He finished the season with the Hershey Bears, playing in the last three games of the season with a record of 2–0–1 and a 2.92 GAA. Laforest was traded to the Toronto Maple Leafs on September 8, 1989, for a fifth and a seventh round draft choice in the 1991 NHL entry draft.

=== Toronto Maple Leafs ===
Upon joining the Maple Leafs, Laforest was assigned to their AHL affiliate, the Newmarket Saints, at the beginning of the 1989–90 season. He was recalled by Toronto on October 21, 1989 and was used in a rotating three-goalie system alongside Allan Bester and Jeff Reese. He made his Maple Leafs debut that night against the Washington Capitals. He earned his first win in a Maple Leafs jersey, with two goals by Vincent Damphousse and Mark Osborne each in an 8–4 victory. Laforest gained notoriety with the Maple Leafs fans after he took part in a line brawl between his team and the New Jersey Devils on October 23. Taunted by Devils goaltender Sean Burke, Laforest skated to Burke's end and the two fought twice before being thrown out of the game. Laforest missed five weeks of the season with an injury. He played his last game for the Maple Leafs on March 28, 1990, a 6–3 loss to the New York Islanders. Laforest was traded to the New York Rangers on June 29, 1990, along with forward Tie Domi for forward Greg Johnston.

=== New York Rangers ===
With Mike Richter and John Vanbiesbrouck entrenched in the Rangers net, Laforest was once again sent to the AHL, joining the New York's affiliate, the Binghamton Rangers on September 27, 1990. Laforest spent the entire season in the AHL, appearing in 45 games with a record of 25–14–2, a GAA of 3.16 and a save percentage of .916. For his play in 1990–91 season, Laforest won his second Aldege "Baz" Bastien Memorial Award as the AHL's top goaltender and was named to the league's Second All-Star Team. For the 1991–92 season he was assigned to Binghamton again on October 1, 1991. He played the entire season in the AHL, with a record of 25–15–3 in 43 games with a GAA of 3.42 and a save percentage of .883. Laforest was recalled by the Rangers and made the roster but never played for them.

The Rangers sought to limit their exposure in the 1992 NHL expansion draft by making a side deal with the expansion Ottawa Senators. Only two players per team could be selected by the expansion teams and the Rangers sought to limit who they would lose by offering to trade two young players to the Senators for future considerations if the Senators selected Laforest. The Senators agreed, but after the draft began, the Rangers reneged and demanded a draft pick to seal the deal. The Senators refused, and the Rangers came with a counter-offer; for selecting Laforest the Rangers would offer only one of the two young players and the Rangers final draft pick in the 1992 NHL entry draft. The Senators selected Laforest in the expansion draft.

=== Ottawa Senators ===
After being selected by the Senators, Laforest was traded back to the New York Rangers in exchange for Jody Hull. However, the Rangers were unwilling to accept Laforest's return and insisted the Senators keep him. However, the Senators mailed a new contract to an address that Laforest no longer used and the goaltender did not receive his contract before the mandatory date, making it ineligible. Ottawa then claimed the goaltender was a free agent and Laforest was forced to look for a new team. Laforest signed in the Colonial Hockey League with the Brantford Smoke and appeared in 10 games with a record of 5–3–1, with a GAA of 3.72 and a save percentage of .882.

The Senators assigned Laforest to their AHL affiliate, the New Haven Senators for the 1992–93 season where he shared the net with rookie goaltender Darrin Madeley. As New Haven was pushing to make the Calder Cup playoffs in their first year, the owner of New Haven, Peter Shipman, insisted that Laforest be the starting goaltender. However, New Haven failed to make the playoffs as they were eliminated by the Providence Bruins. For the 1993–94 season the New Haven team was relocated and became the Prince Edward Island Senators. Laforest was assigned there to start the season. He appeared in 43 games in the AHL with a record of 9–25–5, a GAA of 4.09 and a save percentage of .881. Laforest was recalled by Ottawa and made his NHL Senators debut on March 4, 1994, in relief of starter Craig Billington. Laforest let in the final two goals in a 6–1 loss to the Winnipeg Jets. He played in five games with Ottawa, with a record of 0–2–0, a GAA of 5.60 and a save percentage of .823. His final game in the NHL took place on March 16, 1994, a 7–0 loss to the Los Angeles Kings in which Wayne Gretzky had a goal and four points. At the end of the season, Laforest became a free agent.

=== Final years ===
Laforest played with the Milwaukee Admirals of the IHL for the 1994–95 and 1995–96 seasons. In his second year, he set a personal best, appearing in 53 games that season. In his final season, Laforest played with the Utica Blizzard of the Colonial Hockey League. He was recalled to the Binghamton Rangers in an emergency when goaltender Dan Cloutier was recalled by the New York Rangers to cover for an injured Mike Richter.

== Personal life and death ==
Laforest was born on July 10, 1962, in Welland, Ontario, where he also lived after his retirement from hockey.

Laforest's nickname was "Trees". His younger brother Bob also played in the NHL. Laforest appeared at many alumni events for the Toronto Maple Leafs and the Philadelphia Flyers. He also traveled to Canadian military bases in Kandahar to support Canadian troops during the country's involvement in the War in Afghanistan.

Laforest died suddenly on March 31, 2025, at the age of 62.

== Career statistics ==
=== Regular season and playoffs ===
			Regular season									Playoffs
Season	Team	League	GP	W	L	T	MIN	GA	SO	GAA	SV%	GP	W	L	MIN	GA	SO	GAA	SV%
1980–81	Welland Cougars	GHJHL	22	—	—	—	1262	117	0	5.56	—	—	—	—	—	—	—	—	—
1981–82	Niagara Falls Flyers	OHL	24	10	13	1	1365	105	1	4.62	—	5	1	2	300	19	0	3.80	—
1981–82	Welland Cougars	GHJHL	20	—	—	—	1200	60	3	3.00	—	—	—	—	—	—	—	—	—
1982–83	North Bay Centennials	OHL	54	34	17	1	3140	195	0	3.73	—	8	4	4	474	31	0	3.92	—
1983–84	Adirondack Red Wings	AHL	7	3	3	1	351	29	0	4.96	.855	—	—	—	—	—	—	—	—
1983–84	Kalamazoo Wings	IHL	13	4	5	2	718	48	1	4.01	—	—	—	—	—	—	—	—	—
1984–85	Adirondack Red Wings	AHL	11	2	3	1	430	35	0	4.88	.842	—	—	—	—	—	—	—	—
1984–85	Mohawk Valley Comets	ACHL	8	—	—	—	420	60	0	8.57	—	—	—	—	—	—	—	—	—
1985–86	Detroit Red Wings	NHL	28	4	21	0	1383	114	1	4.95	.846	—	—	—	—	—	—	—	—
1985–86	Adirondack Red Wings	AHL	19	13	5	1	1142	57	0	2.99	.896	17	12	5	1075	58	0	3.24	—
1986–87	Detroit Red Wings	NHL	5	2	1	0	219	12	0	3.29	.892	—	—	—	—	—	—	—	—
1986–87	Adirondack Red Wings	AHL	37	23	8	0	2229	108	3	2.83	.911	—	—	—	—	—	—	—	—
1987–88	Philadelphia Flyers	NHL	21	5	9	2	972	60	1	3.70	.874	2	1	0	48	1	0	1.25	—
1987–88	Hershey Bears	AHL	5	2	1	2	309	13	0	2.52	.917	—	—	—	—	—	—	—	—
1988–89	Philadelphia Flyers	NHL	17	5	7	2	933	65	0	4.12	.871	—	—	—	—	—	—	—	—
1988–89	Hershey Bears	AHL	3	2	0	0	185	9	0	2.92	.889	12	7	5	744	27	1	2.18	—
1989–90	Toronto Maple Leafs	NHL	27	9	14	0	1343	87	0	3.89	.886	—	—	—	—	—	—	—	—
1989–90	Newmarket Saints	AHL	10	6	4	0	604	33	1	3.28	.905	—	—	—	—	—	—	—	—
1990–91	Binghamton Rangers	AHL	45	25	14	2	2452	129	0	3.16	.902	9	3	4	442	28	1	3.80	—
1991–92	Binghamton Rangers	AHL	43	25	15	3	2559	146	1	3.42	.883	11	7	4	662	34	0	3.08	.904
1992–93	New Haven Senators	AHL	30	10	18	1	1688	121	1	4.30	.878	—	—	—	—	—	—	—	—
1992–93	Brantford Smoke	CoHL	10	5	3	1	565	35	1	3.72	.882	—	—	—	—	—	—	—	—
1993–94	PEI Senators	AHL	43	9	25	5	2359	161	0	4.09	.881	—	—	—	—	—	—	—	—
1993–94	Ottawa Senators	NHL	5	0	2	0	182	17	0	5.60	.823	—	—	—	—	—	—	—	—
1994–95	Milwaukee Admirals	IHL	42	19	13	7	2325	123	2	3.17	.899	15	8	7	937	40	2	2.56	.915
1995–96	Milwaukee Admirals	IHL	53	26	20	7	3079	191	0	3.72	.882	5	2	3	315	18	0	3.42	.888
1996–97	Binghamton Rangers	AHL	9	0	4	1	393	26	0	3.97	.876	—	—	—	—	—	—	—	—
1996–97	Utica Blizzard	CoHL	6	1	2	2	312	31	0	5.95	.805	—	—	—	—	—	—	—	—
NHL totals			103	25	54	4	5032	354	2	4.22	.868	2	1	0	48	1	0	1.25	.917

== Awards ==
- 1987, 1991: Aldege "Baz" Bastien Memorial Award (Outstanding Goaltender AHL)
- 1991 AHL Second All-Star Team

== Citations ==
=== Sources ===
- Bernardi, Heather; Tennyson, Kevin (2007). Hockey in New Haven. Charleston, South Carolina: Arcadia Publishing. ISBN 978-0-7385-5455-6.
- Chaimovitch, Jason, ed. (2023). 2023–2024 American Hockey League Official Guide & Record Book. Springfield, Massachusetts: American Hockey League. OCLC 22147888.
- MacGregor, Roy (1993). Road Games: A Year in the Life of the NHL. Toronto: MacFarlane Walter & Ross. ISBN 0-921912-70-6.
- McPhee, Tracy (1999). Chasing the Dream: A Player's Guide. Burnstown, Ontario: General Store Publishing House. ISBN 1-894263-01-4.
- Oliver, Greg; Kamchen, Richard (2014). The Goaltender's Union: Hockey's Greatest Puckstoppers, Acrobats, and Flakes. Toronto: ECW Press. ISBN 978-1-77041-149-4.
- Podnieks, Andrew (2001). The Essential Blue & White Book: A Toronto Maple Leafs Factbook. Vancouver: Greystone Books. ISBN 1-55054-882-4.

Awards and achievements
Preceded by Sam St. Laurent	Aldege "Baz" Bastien Memorial Award; 1986–87	Next: Wendell Young
Preceded by Jean-Claude Bergeron	Aldege "Baz" Bastien Memorial Award; 1990–91	Next: Félix Potvin
