= Denis Larocque =

Canadian ice hockey player

- Born: October 5, 1967 (age 57); Hawkesbury, Ontario, Canada
- Height: 6 ft 1 in (185 cm)
- Weight: 210 lb (95 kg; 15 st 0 lb)
- Position: Defence
- Shot: Left
- Played for: Los Angeles Kings
- NHL draft: 44th overall, 1986; Los Angeles Kings
- Playing career: 1987–1993

Denis "Denny" Larocque (born October 5, 1967), is a Canadian former professional ice hockey player who played in 8 games in the National Hockey League for the Los Angeles Kings during the 1987–88 season. The rest of his career, which lasted from 1987 to 1993, was spent in the minor leagues.

== Career statistics ==
=== Regular season and playoffs ===
| | | | Regular season | | | | | Playoffs |
| Season | Team | League | GP | G | A | Pts | PIM | GP | G | A | Pts | PIM |
|---|---|---|---|---|---|---|---|---|---|---|---|---|
| 1982–83 | Hawkesbury Hawks | CJHL | 31 | 0 | 13 | 13 | 83 | — | — | — | — | — |
| 1983–84 | Guelph Platers | OHL | 65 | 1 | 5 | 6 | 74 | — | — | — | — | — |
| 1984–85 | Guelph Platers | OHL | 62 | 1 | 15 | 16 | 67 | — | — | — | — | — |
| 1985–86 | Guelph Platers | OHL | 66 | 2 | 16 | 18 | 144 | 20 | 1 | 4 | 5 | 44 |
| 1985–86 | Guelph Platers | M-Cup | — | — | — | — | — | 4 | 0 | 2 | 2 | 0 |
| 1986–87 | Guelph Platers | OHL | 45 | 4 | 10 | 14 | 82 | 5 | 0 | 2 | 2 | 9 |
| 1987–88 | Los Angeles Kings | NHL | 8 | 0 | 1 | 1 | 18 | — | — | — | — | — |
| 1987–88 | New Haven Nighthawks | AHL | 58 | 4 | 10 | 14 | 154 | — | — | — | — | — |
| 1988–89 | New Haven Nighthawks | AHL | 15 | 2 | 2 | 4 | 51 | — | — | — | — | — |
| 1988–89 | Denver Rangers | IHL | 30 | 2 | 8 | 10 | 39 | 4 | 0 | 2 | 2 | 10 |
| 1989–90 | Flint Spirits | IHL | 31 | 1 | 2 | 3 | 66 | — | — | — | — | — |
| 1989–90 | Cape Breton Oilers | AHL | 26 | 2 | 4 | 6 | 39 | 6 | 0 | 1 | 1 | 12 |
| 1990–91 | Moncton Hawks | AHL | 68 | 2 | 9 | 11 | 92 | 1 | 0 | 0 | 0 | 2 |
| 1991–92 | St. Thomas Wildcats | CoHL | 55 | 9 | 21 | 30 | 133 | 10 | 3 | 6 | 9 | 55 |
| 1992–93 | St. Thomas Wildcats | CoHL | 18 | 1 | 4 | 5 | 17 | 13 | 1 | 3 | 4 | 24 |
| 1992–93 | Dayton Bombers | ECHL | 5 | 0 | 0 | 0 | 17 | — | — | — | — | — |
| AHL totals | | | 167 | 10 | 25 | 35 | 336 | 7 | 0 | 1 | 1 | 14 |
| NHL totals | | | 8 | 0 | 1 | 1 | 18 | — | — | — | — | — |
