= Mitch Molloy =

Canadian ice hockey player (1965–2024)

- Born: October 10, 1965 Red Lake, Ontario, Canada
- Died: March 3, 2024 (aged 58) Revelstoke, British Columbia, Canada
- Height: 6 ft 3 in (191 cm)
- Weight: 212 lb (96 kg; 15 st 2 lb)
- Position: Left wing
- Shot: Left
- Played for: Buffalo Sabres
- NHL draft: Undrafted
- Playing career: 1988–1993

Mitchell Dennis Molloy (October 10, 1965 – March 3, 2024) was a Canadian professional ice hockey left winger who played two games in the National Hockey League (NHL) for the Buffalo Sabres during the 1989–90 season. The rest of his career, which lasted from 1988 to 1993, was spent in various minor leagues.

== Playing career ==
=== College and Minor Leagues ===
Molloy started his hockey career playing for the Camrose Lutheran College Vikings during the 1986–87 season. In his lone season with the Vikings, Molloy scored nine goals and thirteen points in twenty-three games. Molloy would sign with his first professional team, the Virginia Lancers of the newly formed All-American Hockey League. Molloy provided a physical presence along with goal-scoring ability, scoring twenty-six goals and seventy-one points. He also finished the season with 196 PIM. With Molloy on the team, the Lancers (coached by future Stanley Cup-winning coach John Tortorella) went 37-5-0-1 and had the league's best regular season record.

Molloy spent the majority of the 1988–89 season with the Maine Mariners of the AHL. He was loaned to the Flint Spirits of the IHL for five games during the season.

Molloy signed with the Johnstown Chiefs of the East Coast Hockey League at the start of the 1989-90 season. He played eighteen games with the Chiefs, scoring ten goals and ten assists before being offered a contract by the Buffalo Sabres of the National Hockey League.

=== Buffalo Sabres ===
Molloy signed as a free agent with the Buffalo Sabres in February 1990 and was assigned to the American Hockey League to play for the Sabres' affiliate the Rochester Americans. He got called up from Rochester and made his NHL debut in a game against the Calgary Flames on March 21, 1990 at the Buffalo Memorial Auditorium where he would fight NHL veteran Tim Hunter. He played his second and final game in the NHL on April 1, 1990 in the Sabres' last game of the regular season against the Quebec Nordiques, getting into another fight with rookie enforcer Brent Severyn. Like Molloy's first game in the NHL, his final NHL game was played at the Memorial Auditorium. As a member of the Sabres, Molloy wore jersey number 40.

Molloy was the second player to play a game in the NHL as a previous member of the ECHL. Former Johnstown Chiefs goaltender Scott Gordon played his first game in the NHL with the Quebec Nordiques on January 30, 1990. Like Gordon, Molloy had also played for the Chiefs earlier in his career but they were not teammates, as Gordon left the organization after the 1988–89 ECHL season. Molloy was one of four Sabres players to make their debut on three consecutive nights. Teammates Bob Corkum, Francois Guay, and Darcy Loewen all made their debuts back-to-back-to-back games. This feat has since been duplicated in 1996 and once again in 2011.

=== Return To Minor Leagues ===
Molloy returned to the Sabres for the 1990–91 season, but was assigned to Rochester prior to the start of the 1990–91 season. Molloy was one of four players who were suspended due to a pre-game fight with the Binghamton Rangers; the others being Rudy Poeschek, Tie Domi and then-teammate Steve Ludzik. The Sabres released Molloy after the season.

Molloy spent the next two seasons with the St. Thomas Wildcats of the Colonial Hockey League before retiring after the completion of the 1992–93 season.

== Personal life ==
Following his retirement, Molloy returned to Alberta where he worked as the Managing Director of Capital Markets at Peters & Co. Limited.

Molloy died on March 3, 2024, at the age of 58.

== Transactions ==
- Signed as a free agent by the Buffalo Sabres, February, 1990.

== Career statistics ==
=== Regular season and playoffs ===
			Regular season					Playoffs
Season	Team	League	GP	G	A	Pts	PIM	GP	G	A	Pts	PIM
1986–87	Camrose Lutheran College	ACAC	23	9	4	13	70	—	—	—	—	—
1987–88	Virginia Lancers	AAHL	43	26	45	71	196	8	5	4	9	63
1988–89	Marine Mariners	AHL	47	1	8	9	177	—	—	—	—	—
1988–89	Flint Spirits	IHL	5	1	1	2	21	—	—	—	—	—
1989–90	Buffalo Sabres	NHL	2	0	0	0	10	—	—	—	—	—
1989–90	Johnstown Chiefs	ECHL	18	10	10	20	102	—	—	—	—	—
1989–90	Rochester Americans	AHL	15	1	1	2	43	—	—	—	—	—
1990–91	Rochester Americans	AHL	25	1	0	1	127	—	—	—	—	—
1991–92	St. Thomas Wildcats	CoHL	52	26	33	59	149	10	9	5	14	30
1992–93	San Diego Gulls	IHL	8	0	0	0	8	—	—	—	—	—
1992–93	St. Thomas Wildcats	CoHL	9	2	6	8	14	12	6	3	9	39
AHL totals			87	3	9	12	347	—	—	—	—	—
NHL totals			2	0	0	0	10	—	—	—	—	—
