= Robin Bouchard =

Canadian ice hockey player (born 1973)

- Born: October 22, 1973 (age 52) Jonquière, Quebec, Canada
- Height: 5 ft 10 in (178 cm)
- Weight: 190 lb (86 kg; 13 st 8 lb)
- Position: Right wing
- Shot: Right
- NHL draft: Undrafted
- Playing career: 1994–2010

Robin Bouchard (born October 22, 1973) is a retired Canadian professional ice hockey player who played sixteen seasons of minor league hockey. He holds the modern-era minor league goal scoring record, scoring 687 goals while playing in the ECHL, CoHL, United Hockey League, CHL, and the modern-day IHL.

== Professional career ==
=== ECHL ===
Bouchard started his career with the Roanoke Express under head coach Frank Anzalone. He chose the Express "because the owners were French-Canadian." Bouchard scored his first goal as a result of a defenseman's slap shot that went wide. The puck ended up on Bouchard's stick and he shot into the open side of the net. After ten games and only one goal scored, coach Anzalone was convinced even though Bouchard was a goal scorer in juniors, he wasn't convinced that Bouchard had what it took to score in the professional leagues. Anzalone traded Bouchard and center Andrew Dickson to the Columbus Chill for future considerations on November 30, 1994. Bouchard responded to the trade by scoring thirty goals in forty-six games.

=== CoHL/UHL/IHL ===
Bouchard signed with the Flint Generals of the Colonial Hockey League. He led the team in scoring with 56 goals and 107 points, and led the Generals to the 1996 Colonial Cup Finals, where the Generals defeated the Thunder Bay Senators four games to two. Bouchard would play another partial season with the Generals before being briefly recalled to the IHL's Fort Wayne Komets.

Shortly after Bouchard's return to the team, Generals coach Robbie Nichols and Muskegon Fury coach Paul Kelly set up a trade: Bouchard for Detroit Vipers' prospect Steve Walker. Vipers' management wanted Walker closer to Detroit, so the trade was approved. Walker played thirteen games for the Vipers, was recalled, and never played for the Generals again.

Despite playing the majority of his 13 seasons in Muskegon, Bouchard remembers driving into the city to report, viewing the run-down buildings and thinking "Woah, I'll finish this year and I want to get out of here." With the exception of two stops in Texas, where he played in San Angelo and Rio Grande Valley Killer Bees, Bouchard remained in Muskegon until his retirement in 2010.

In January, 2014, during the 50th Jonquiere Pee-Wee Tournament, Bouchard was honoured at a rink in his hometown with a permanent display of his accomplishments. A banner bearing Bouchard's name and jersey, #32, was raised to the rafters at the Foyer de Loisirs et de la Culture in Saguenay, Quebec.

== Modern Day Goal Scoring Record ==
On March 21, 2010, while playing the Muskegon Lumberjacks, Bouchard scored the 683rd goal of his career. The goal, set up by teammate Todd Robinson, was scored with 5:50 remaining in the first period. It was Bouchard's 56th goal of the season. The game was stopped for nearly 10 minutes, with Bouchard thanking teammates, fans, and opposing team's coach Frank Anzalone (who was Bouchard's first coach in Roanoke and traded him to Columbus a month into his rookie season.)

== Controversy ==
Although Bouchard's 687 goals are viewed as a modern-day record, there is a debate as to whether it is the all-time record. Dick Roberge, a forward who played in throughout the 1950s, 1960's, and 1970's scored 756 career goals in his 18-year career, has also been viewed as minor-league hockey's all-time goal-scoring leader.

== Records ==
- Modern day goal-scoring record (687): 1994-2010
- Most consecutive games with a goal (17): 2009-2010 IHL season

== Awards ==
- 2005: Sher-wood/UHL Player Of The Week (January 3–9, 2005)
- 2009-10: James Gatschne Trophy, awarded to the IHL's Most Valuable Player
