= Dayton Ice Bandits =

- City: Dayton, Ohio
- League: Colonial Hockey League
- Home arena: Hara Arena
- Colors: Surfie green, navy blue, white
- Head coach: Dan Belisle

Franchise history
- 1991–1994: St. Thomas Wildcats
- 1994–1995: London Wildcats
- 1996–1997: Dayton Ice Bandits
- 1998–2001: Mohawk Valley Prowlers

The Dayton Ice Bandits were a minor professional Colonial Hockey League team that played from 1996 to 1997 in Dayton, Ohio.

The franchise was originally the St. Thomas Wildcats in St. Thomas, Ontario, one of the original franchises in the Colonial Hockey League (CoHL). The team eventually moved from St. Thomas to neighboring London, Ontario, which was a market ten times bigger than St. Thomas. The team still struggled to draw fans, and the franchise suspended operations. The team sat out the 1995–96 season, but relocated to Hara Arena in Dayton for the 1996–97 season to replace the Dayton Bombers of the East Coast Hockey League, which had moved to the larger Nutter Center across town. The team was coached by Dan Belisle, former head coach of the Indianapolis Jr. Ice (North American Hockey League) and Jacksonville Bullets (Southern Hockey League). The club still did not draw well, finished last in the league standings, and suspended operations after only one season in Dayton. There was interest in buying the franchise and relocating the team to Utica, New York, in 1997 following the relocation of the Utica Blizzard and the franchise then moved again to become the Mohawk Valley Prowlers in 1998.
