= 2000–01 UHL season =

- Finals champions: Quad City Mallards

Seasons
- ← 1999–00 2001–02 →

The 2000–01 United Hockey League season was the 10th season of the United Hockey League (Colonial Hockey League before 1997), a North American minor professional league. 15 teams participated in the regular season and the Quad City Mallards won the league title.

== Regular season ==
Northeast Division	GP	W	L	T	GF	GA	Pts
Adirondack Icehawks	74	40	28	6	259	235	86
Elmira Jackals	74	32	33	9	260	289	73
B. C. Icemen	74	31	34	9	263	290	71
Mohawk Valley Prowlers	54	15	33	6	153	253	36

Northwest Division	GP	W	L	T	GF	GA	Pts
Fort Wayne Komets	74	42	26	6	261	253	90
Muskegon Fury	74	37	28	9	242	240	83
Flint Generals	74	30	34	10	253	303	70
Port Huron Border Cats	74	30	34	10	234	260	70

Southeast Division	GP	W	L	T	GF	GA	Pts
Asheville Smoke	74	45	22	7	297	240	97
New Haven Knights	74	41	26	7	268	217	89
Knoxville Speed	74	39	31	4	238	233	82

Southwest Division	GP	W	L	T	GF	GA	Pts
Quad City Mallards	74	55	12	7	341	216	117
Missouri River Otters	74	41	24	9	268	259	91
Kalamazoo Wings	74	37	31	6	220	220	80
Rockford IceHogs	74	30	38	6	207	256	66

== Colonial Cup-Playoffs ==
Colonial Cup-Pre-Playoffs
NW2	Muskegon Fury	1
SW3	Kalamazoo Wings	0
NE2	Elmira Jackals	0
SE3	Knoxville Speed	1

Colonial Cup-Quarterfinals
SW1	Quad City Mallards	3
NW2	Muskegon Fury	1
NW1	Fort Wayne Komets	3
SW2	Missouri River Otters	1
SE1	Asheville Smoke	3
SE3	Knoxville Speed	0
NE1	Adirondack Icehawks	2
SE2	New Haven Knights	3

Colonial Cup-Semifinals
SW1	Quad City Mallards	3
NW1	Fort Wayne Komets	0
SE1	Asheville Smoke	3
SE2	New Haven Knights	0

Colonial Cup-Final
SW1	Quad City Mallards	4
SE1	Asheville Smoke	1
