= Madison Monsters =

- City: Madison, Wisconsin
- League: United Hockey League
- Founded: 1995
- Home arena: Dane County Memorial Coliseum
- Colors: Purple, teal, red, yellow

Franchise history
- 1995–1999: Madison Monsters
- 1999–2002: Knoxville Speed

The Madison Monsters were a minor professional ice hockey team in the United Hockey League (UHL) based in Madison, Wisconsin, with home games in the Dane County Memorial Coliseum. The city of Madison was granted the franchise before the 1995–96 Colonial Hockey League (CoHL) season along with the Quad City Mallards. The Monsters were the first CoHL hockey team to be established in Wisconsin. The CoHL rebranded as the United Hockey League in 1997.

The team moved to Knoxville, Tennessee, as the Knoxville Speed before the 1999–2000 season by team owner Andrew Wilhelm. The Monsters were replaced in Madison the following season by a UHL expansion team, the Madison Kodiaks, but only lasted one season before also relocating.
