= 1993–94 Colonial Hockey League season =

1993–94 CoHL season
- Finals champions: Thunder Bay Senators

Seasons
- ← 1992–93 1994–95 →

The 1993–94 Colonial Hockey League season was the third season of the Colonial Hockey League, a North American minor professional league. Eight teams participated in the regular season and the Thunder Bay Senators won the league title.

== Regular season ==
East Division	GP	W	L	T	GF	GA	Pts
Thunder Bay Senators	64	45	15	4	331	236	94
Brantford Smoke	64	28	26	10	308	348	66
St. Thomas Wildcats	64	22	34	8	284	343	52
Utica Bulldogs	64	21	39	4	226	330	46

West Division	GP	W	L	T	GF	GA	Pts
Chatham Wheels	64	39	18	7	336	281	85
Muskegon Fury	64	35	24	5	319	301	75
Detroit Falcons	64	34	25	5	296	275	73
Flint Generals	64	32	23	9	328	314	73

== Colonial Cup-Playoffs ==
Colonial Cup-Quarterfinals
E1	Thunder Bay Senators
Bye
E2	Brantford Smoke	3
W2	Muskegon Fury	0
W1	Chatham Wheels	3
E3	St. Thomas Wildcats	0
W3	Detroit Falcons	1
W4	Flint Generals	3

Colonial Cup-Semifinals
E1	Thunder Bay Senators	4
E2	Brantford Smoke	0
W1	Chatham Wheels	4
W4	Flint Generals	3

Colonial Cup-Final
E1	Thunder Bay Senators	4
W1	Chatham Wheels	1
