= Mohawk Valley Prowlers =

Mowhawk Valley Prowlers
- City: Utica, New York
- League: United Hockey League
- Founded: 1991
- Folded: 2001
- Home arena: Utica Memorial Auditorium
- Colors: Blue, black, white

Franchise history
- 1991–1994: St. Thomas Wildcats
- 1994–1995 ceased operations Jan 11, 1996.: London Wildcats
- 1996–1997: Dayton Ice Bandits
- 1998–2001: Mohawk Valley Prowlers

The Mohawk Valley Prowlers were a minor professional ice hockey based in Utica, New York, as a member of the United Hockey League (UHL) that played from 1998 to 2001. The Dayton Ice Bandits' franchise was purchased and relocated following the relocation of the Utica Blizzard in 1997. In February 2001, the team were forced to fold by the league in the middle of the 2000–01 season as the team was $2 million in debt, filed for Chapter 11 bankruptcy, and could not pay the players' wages leading to a player strike on February 11, 2001.
