= 1999–2000 UHL season =

9th United Hockey League season

- Finals champions: Flint Generals

Seasons
- ← 1998–99 2000–01 →

The 1999–2000 United Hockey League season was the ninth season of the United Hockey League (Colonial Hockey League before 1997), a North American minor professional league. 14 teams participated in the regular season and the Flint Generals won the league title.

== Offseason ==
The Fort Wayne Komets joined the league as an expansion team after departing from the IHL.

The Thunder Bay Thunder Cats were bought by United Sports Ventures and relocated the team to Rockford to become the Rockford IceHogs

The Madison Monsters relocated to Knoxville to become the Knoxville Speed

The Winston-Salem Icehawks relocated to Glens Falls to become the Adirondack Icehawks.

The Saginaw Gears relocated to Massillon, Ohio midseason after opting out of their lease with Wendler Arena

== Regular season ==
Central Division	GP	W	L	T	GF	GA	Pts
Flint Generals	74	51	14	9	379	250	111
Port Huron Border Cats	74	47	21	6	269	202	100
Muskegon Fury	74	43	26	5	266	250	91
Fort Wayne Komets	74	40	27	7	281	251	87
Saginaw/Ohio Gears	74	12	57	5	198	370	29

Eastern Division	GP	W	L	T	GF	GA	Pts
B. C. Icemen	74	47	20	7	279	222	101
Mohawk Valley Prowlers	74	28	31	15	254	295	71
Asheville Smoke	74	34	38	2	279	315	70
Adirondack Icehawks	74	28	34	12	260	308	68
Knoxville Speed	74	29	41	4	236	314	62

Western Division	GP	W	L	T	GF	GA	Pts
Quad City Mallards	74	53	16	5	369	264	111
Missouri River Otters	74	39	29	6	275	252	84
Madison Kodiaks	74	35	33	6	254	276	76
Rockford IceHogs	74	32	34	8	238	268	72

== Colonial Cup-Playoffs ==
Colonial Cup-Pre-Playoffs
C1	Flint Generals
Bye
W3	Madison Kodiaks	2
W4	Rockford IceHogs	1
C2	Port Huron Border Cats
Bye
C3	Muskegon Fury	2
E4	Adirondack Icehawks	0
W1	Quad City Mallards
Bye
E2	Mohawk Valley Prowlers	2
W2	Missouri River Otters	1
E1	B. C. Icemen
Bye
E3	Asheville Smoke	0
C4	Fort Wayne Komets	2

Colonial Cup-Quarterfinals
C1	Flint Generals	4
W3	Madison Kodiaks	2
C2	Port Huron Border Cats	2
C3	Muskegon Fury	4
W1	Quad City Mallards	4
E2	Mohawk Valley Prowlers	1
E1	B. C. Icemen	2
C4	Fort Wayne Komets	4

Colonial Cup-Semifinals
C1	Flint Generals	4
C3	Muskegon Fury	1
W1	Quad City Mallards	4
C4	Fort Wayne Komets	1

Colonial Cup-Final
C1	Flint Generals	4
W1	Quad City Mallards	0
