= Madison Kodiaks =

Ice hockey team

- City: Madison, Wisconsin
- League: United Hockey League
- Founded: 1999
- Home arena: Dane County Memorial Coliseum
- Colors: Brown, deep sea green, black, white
- Head coach: Kent Hawley

Franchise history
- 1999–2000: Madison Kodiaks
- 2000–present: Kalamazoo Wings

The Madison Kodiaks were a minor professional ice hockey team based in Madison, Wisconsin, during the 1999–2000 United Hockey League season. Affiliated with the AHL Milwaukee Admirals, the Kodiaks were an expansion team that filled the void left by the recently departed Madison Monsters.

In the team's sole season, the Kodiaks finished in third place in the Western Division, going on to defeat the Rockford IceHogs in a best-of-three first round series. However, the Kodiaks lost their second round series to the eventual champion Flint Generals in six games. The team's leading scorer was Josh Boni with 99 points, and their leading goal scorer was Jim Duhart with 43. Duhart went on to score a remarkable 20 points in only nine playoff games, finishing second in the league in playoff scoring despite playing in two fewer playoff series than the league leader, Nick Stajduhar of the Generals.

After that one season—having the lowest attendance of any team in its small-market league—the team moved to Kalamazoo, Michigan, to play as the second incarnation of the Kalamazoo Wings.

The team's last active player was Dominic Chiasson, who last played professional hockey with the Cornwall River Kings of the LNAH in 2015.

== Players ==
=== Team captains ===
- Unknown, 1999–00
