= 2004–05 UHL season =

- Finals champions: Muskegon Fury

Seasons
- ← 2003–04 2005–06 →

The 2004–05 United Hockey League season was the 14th season of the United Hockey League (Colonial Hockey League before 1997), a North American minor professional league. 14 teams participated in the regular season and the Muskegon Fury won the league title.

== Regular season ==
Central Division	GP	W	L	T	GF	GA	Pts
Muskegon Fury	80	51	20	9	285	195	111
Kalamazoo Wings	80	50	24	6	257	204	106
Motor City Mechanics	80	37	36	7	229	262	81
Flint Generals	80	33	33	14	237	236	80
Port Huron Beacons	80	34	40	6	245	283	74

Eastern Division	GP	W	L	T	GF	GA	Pts
Adirondack Frostbite	80	48	24	8	276	235	104
Danbury Trashers	80	44	29	7	265	243	95
Richmond RiverDogs	80	33	42	5	245	319	71
Elmira Jackals	80	24	51	5	224	310	53

Western Division	GP	W	L	T	GF	GA	Pts
Fort Wayne Komets	80	51	24	5	274	211	107
Rockford IceHogs	80	46	25	9	246	203	101
Missouri River Otters	80	42	32	6	217	224	90
Quad City Mallards	80	39	30	11	226	228	89
Kansas City Outlaws	80	28	45	7	217	290	63

== Colonial Cup-Playoffs ==
Colonial Cup-Quarterfinals
C1	Muskegon Fury	4
W4	Quad City Mallards	3
E1	Adirondack Frostbite	2
E2	Danbury Trashers	4
W1	Fort Wayne Komets	4
W3	Missouri River Otters	2
W2	Rockford IceHogs	4
C2	Kalamazoo Wings	2

Colonial Cup-Semifinals
C1	Muskegon Fury	4
E2	Danbury Trashers	1
W1	Fort Wayne Komets	4
W2	Rockford IceHogs	3

Colonial Cup-Final
C1	Muskegon Fury	4
W1	Fort Wayne Komets	1
