= 1996–97 Colonial Hockey League season =

1996–97 CoHL season
- Finals champions: Quad City Mallards

Seasons
- ← 1995–96 1997–98 →

The 1996–97 Colonial Hockey League season was the sixth season of the Colonial Hockey League, a North American minor professional league. Ten teams participated in the regular season and the Quad City Mallards won the league title.

== Regular season ==
East Division	GP	W	L	T	GF	GA	Pts
Flint Generals	74	55	18	1	371	232	111
Brantford Smoke	74	42	25	7	321	286	91
Port Huron Border Cats	74	38	31	5	280	288	81
Utica Blizzard	74	22	42	10	278	385	54
Saginaw Lumber Kings	74	21	48	5	263	399	47

West Division	GP	W	L	T	GF	GA	Pts
Quad City Mallards	74	51	20	3	384	245	105
Madison Monsters	74	46	21	7	315	259	99
Thunder Bay Thunder Cats	74	43	23	8	333	266	94
Muskegon Fury	74	39	29	6	268	257	84
Dayton Ice Bandits	74	13	53	8	216	412	34

== Colonial Cup-Playoffs ==
Colonial Cup-Quarterfinals
E1	Flint	3
E4	Utica	0
E2	Brantford	3
E3	Port Huron	2
W1	Quad City	3
W4	Muskegon	0
W2	Madison	2
W3	Thunder Bay	3

Colonial Cup-Semifinals
E1	Flint	4
E2	Brantford	1
W1	Quad City	4
W3	Thunder Bay	2

Colonial Cup-Final
E1	Flint	2
W1	Quad City	4
