= Kalamazoo Wings =

Ice hockey team in Michigan, US

- City: Kalamazoo, Michigan, United States
- League: ECHL
- Conference: Western
- Division: Central
- Founded: 1999 (in the UHL)
- Home arena: Wings Event Center
- Colors: Red, white, blue
- Owner: William D. Johnston/Ronda Stryker (Greenleaf Hospitality)
- General manager: Toni Will
- Head coach: Joel Martin
- Captain: Collin Saccoman
- Media: WKZO; Kalamazoo Gazette
- Affiliates: Vancouver Canucks (NHL); Abbotsford Canucks (AHL)
- Website: kwings.com

Franchise history
- 1999–2000: Madison Kodiaks
- 2000–present: Kalamazoo Wings

Championships
- Regular season titles: 1 UHL 2005–06
- Division titles: 1 UHL 2005–06; 4 ECHL 2009–10, 2010–11, 2011–12, 2013–14
- Conference titles: 2 UHL 2005–06, 2006–07; 1 ECHL 2010–11
- Colonial Cups: 1 UHL 2005–06
- Kelly Cups: 0 ECHL

The Kalamazoo Wings, nicknamed the K-Wings, are a mid-level professional ice hockey team in Kalamazoo, Michigan. A member of the ECHL's Western Conference, Central Division, they play in the 5,113-seat Wings Event Center. They are the affiliate of the Vancouver Canucks of the National Hockey League, and the Abbotsford Canucks of the American Hockey League.

Kalamazoo is home to the "Green Ice Game". Played since 1982 on St. Patrick's Day, it is one of the most celebrated games in minor league hockey. The team has sought to duplicate the game's success with the Pink Ice Game (Valentine's Day), the Orange Ice Game (Halloween), the Lavender Ice game (Hockey Fights Cancer) and the Rainbow Ice game.

== History ==
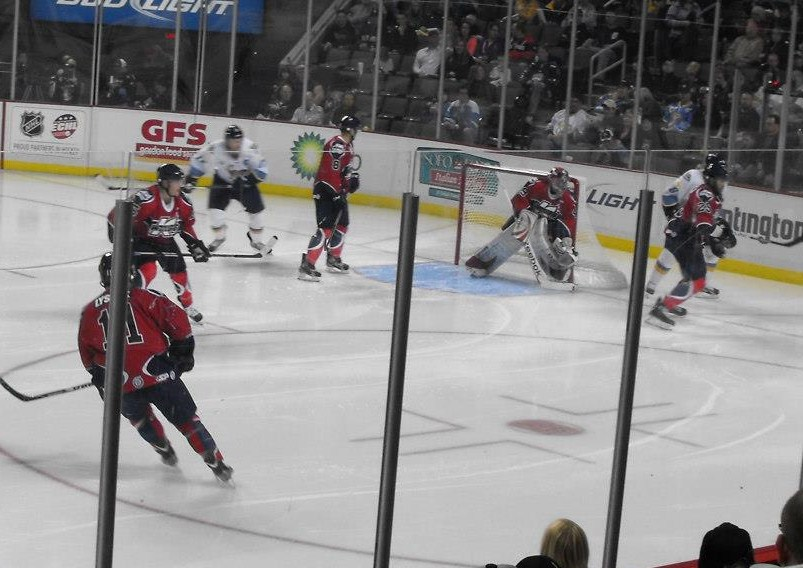
A road game in October 2012 vs. Toledo Walleye.

The team began in the 1999–2000 season as the United Hockey League's Madison Kodiaks in Madison, Wisconsin. After one season in Madison, the franchise moved to Kalamazoo, where it renamed itself the Wings in honor of the original Wings that had played in the International Hockey League from 1974 through 2000. The new K-Wings obtained the rights to use the original team's name, colors, logos, and history as their own.

The K-Wings played in the UHL from October 2000 until June 1, 2009, when they withdrew because of concerns that the league, which had renamed itself the International Hockey League in 2007, might go bankrupt. Eight days later, the K-Wings joined the ECHL. From September 13, 2012, until the end of the 2014–15 season, the Wings had an affiliation with the American Hockey League's Chicago Wolves. They were also affiliated with the National Hockey League's Columbus Blue Jackets and Vancouver Canucks as well as their AHL affiliates the Springfield Falcons and Utica Comets, respectively.

Prior to the 2015–16 season, the ECHL required teams to only have one official NHL/AHL affiliate, leading to the K-Wings only keeping their Columbus affiliation and the Blue Jackets' new AHL affiliate, the Lake Erie Monsters. They ended their affiliation with the Blue Jackets after one season and affiliated with the Tampa Bay Lightning and Syracuse Crunch for the 2016–17 season. They changed again for the 2017–18 season to the Canucks and Comets, their previous affiliates for several seasons.

Due to the COVID-19 pandemic, the Wings voluntarily suspended operations for the 2020–21 ECHL season. When the team returned for the 2021–22 season, they switched their affiliation back to the Columbus Blue Jackets. On June 23, 2022, the Wings signed an affiliation extension with the Blue Jackets (and therefore the Cleveland Monsters also) for the 2022–23 season

On July 10, 2023, Kalamazoo announced they had returned to the Vancouver Canucks organization in an affiliation agreement for the 2023–24 season. They also entered an agreement with the Canucks AHL affiliate in Abbotsford. On July 30, 2024, they extended their affiliation for two years with both Vancouver and Abbotsford, through the end of the 2025–26 season.

== Season-by-season results ==
Season	GP	W	L	T/OTL	Pts	GF	GA	Pct	Regular Season Finish	Playoffs
United Hockey League
2000–01	74	37	31	6	80	220	220	.541	3rd Southwest, 9th of 15	Lost Play-in game vs. Muskegon Fury
2001–02	74	27	37	8	66	213	277	.446	6th Western, 11th of 14	did not qualify
2002–03	76	29	39	8	66	210	282	.434	5th Western, 10th of 10	did not qualify
2003–04	76	45	22	9	99	281	207	.651	4th Western, 4th of 12	Lost Quarterfinal series vs. Fort Wayne Komets, 2–3
2004–05	80	50	24	6	100	257	204	.663	2nd Central, 3rd of 14	Lost Semifinal series vs. Fort Wayne Komets, 3–4
2005–06	76	52	17	7	111	332	183	.730	1st Central, 1st of 14	Won Colonial Cup Final series vs. Danbury Trashers, 4–1
2006–07	76	47	23	6	100	251	191	.658	2nd Eastern, 4th of 10	Lost Colonial Cup Final series vs. Rockford IceHogs, 3–4
International Hockey League
2007–08	76	31	34	11	73	242	252	.480	5th of 6 IHL	did not qualify
2008–09	76	44	29	3	91	274	253	.599	4th of 6 IHL	Lost Semifinal series vs. Fort Wayne Komets, 3–4
ECHL
2009–10	72	42	20	10	94	273	243	.653	1st North, 3rd of 20	Lost Quarterfinal series vs. Reading Royals, 2–3
2010–11	72	40	24	8	88	255	225	.611	1st North, 4th of 19	Lost Kelly Cup Final series vs. Alaska Aces, 1–4
2011–12	72	38	26	8	84	264	237	.583	1st North, 8th of 20	Lost Eastern Conference Final series vs. Florida Everblades, 1–4
2012–13	72	34	30	8	76	205	215	.528	3rd North, 14th of 23	did not qualify
2013–14	72	42	22	8	92	224	197	.639	1st North, 4th of 21	Lost Quarterfinal series vs. Greenville Road Warriors, 2–4
2014–15	72	36	30	6	78	226	233	.542	3rd North, 16th of 28	Lost Division Semifinal series vs. Fort Wayne Komets, 1–4
2015–16	72	38	28	6	82	233	230	.569	3rd North, 13th of 28	Lost Conference Quarterfinal series vs. South Carolina Stingrays, 1–4
2016–17	72	38	30	4	80	222	237	.556	4th Central, 15th of 27	Lost Division Semifinal series vs. Toledo Walleye, 3–4
2017–18	72	34	31	7	75	251	251	.521	5th Central, 16th of 27	did not qualify
2018–19	72	36	31	5	77	229	254	.535	4th Central, 15th of 27	Lost Division Semifinal series vs. Cincinnati Cyclones, 2–4
2019–20	61	23	30	8	54	194	241	.443	5th Central, 22nd of 26	Season cancelled
2020–21	Opted out of participating due to the COVID-19 pandemic									
2021–22	72	36	35	1	73	224	255	.507	5th Central, 19th of 27	did not qualify
2022–23	72	29	37	6	64	178	226	.444	5th Central, 23rd of 28	did not qualify
2023–24	72	38	30	4	80	214	203	.556	4th Central, 13th of 27	Lost Division Semifinal vs. Toledo Walleye, 0–4
2024–25	72	31	33	8	70	201	229	.486	5th Central, 14th of 29	did not qualify
2025–26	72	36	30	6	78	228	246	.542	5th Central, 15th of 30	did not qualify

== Players ==
=== Team captains ===
==== First franchise ====
===== IHL (First incarnation) =====
- Unknown, 1974–95
- Brad Berry, 1995–99
- Unknown, 1999–00

==== Second franchise ====
Note: This list does not include captains from the Madison Kodiaks.

===== UHL =====
- Unknown, 2000–03
- Marty Flichel, 2003–04
- Tyler Willis, 2004–05
- Nick Bootland, 2005–07

===== IHL (Second incarnation) =====
- Nick Bootland, 2007–08
- Glenn Detulleo, 2008–09

===== ECHL =====
- Sam Ftorek, 2009–10
- Wes O'Neill, 2010–12
- Elgin Reid, 2012–13
- Jean Bourbeau, 2014–15
- Tyler Shattock, 2015–17
- Ben Wilson, 2017–20
- Justin Taylor, 2021–22
- Chaz Reddekopp, 2023–24
- Collin Saccoman, 2024–present

=== Retired numbers ===
- #1 Georges Gagnon
- #13 Tyler Willis
- #22 Mike Wanchuk
- #26 Kevin Schamehorn
- #27 Neil Meadmore

== Team records ==
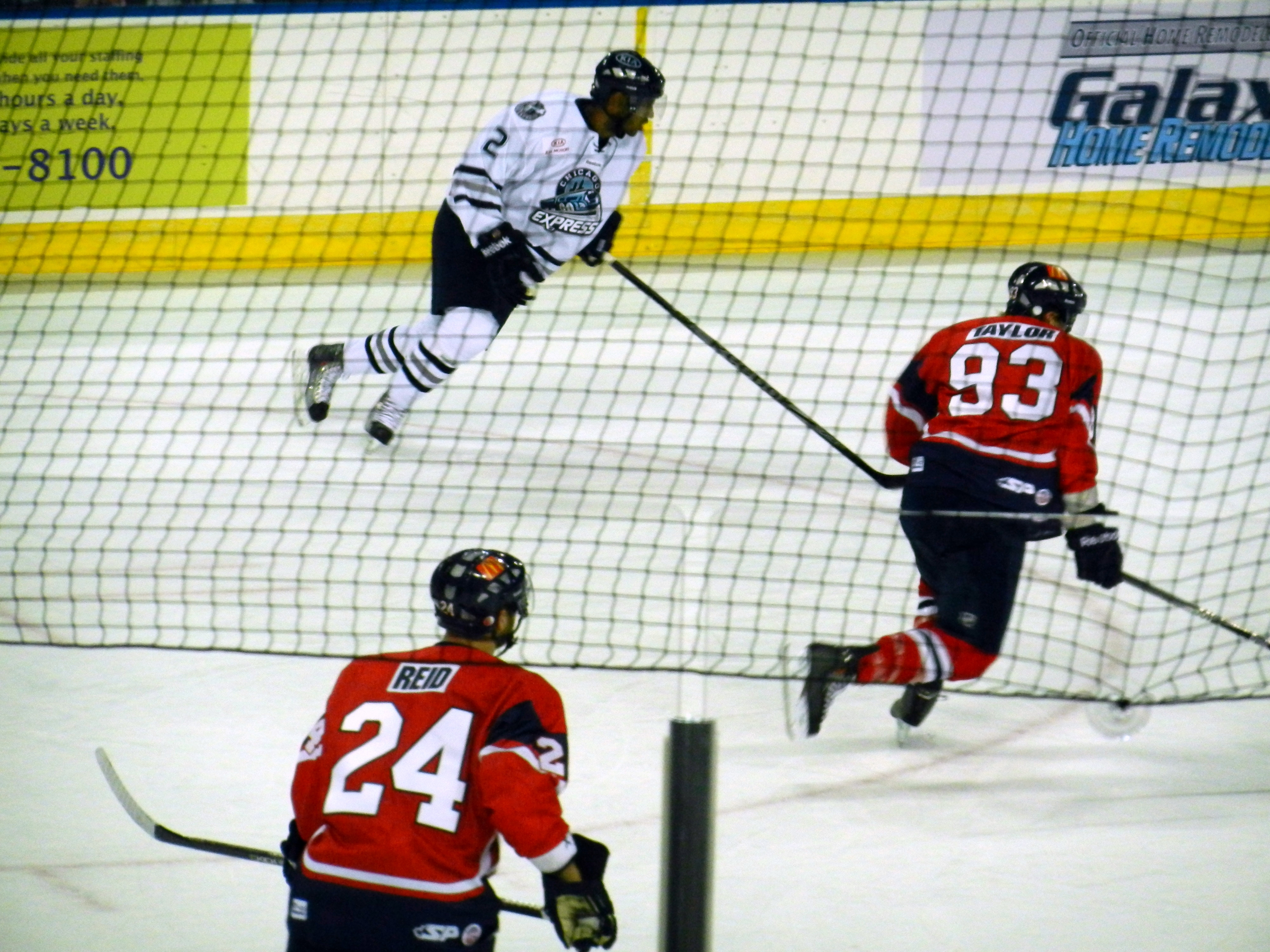
Kalamazoo Wings playing against the Chicago Express in 2011

=== Single season ===
Goals: 46 (Canada) Nick Bootland (2007–08)
Assists: 70 (Canada) Daniel Carriere (2005–06)
Points: 94 (Canada) Kory Karlander (2007–08)
Penalty minutes: 344 (Canada) Tyler Willis (2003–04)
GAA: 2.02 (Canada) Ryan Nie (2006–07)
SV%: .929 (Canada) Ryan Nie (2006–07)

=== Career ===
Career games played: 614 (Canada) Justin Taylor (2010–22)
Career goals: 237 (Canada) Justin Taylor (2010–22)
Career assists: 263 (Canada) Kory Karlander (2004–13)
Career points: 457 (Canada) Justin Taylor (2010–22)
Career penalty minutes: 1,463 (Canada) Tyler Willis (2003–10)
Career goaltending games played: 422 (Canada) Joel Martin (2004-18)
Career goaltending wins: 152 (Canada) Joel Martin (2004–18)
Career shutouts: 18 (Canada) Joel Martin (2004–18)
