= Asheville Smoke =

American ice hockey team

- City: Asheville, North Carolina
- League: United Hockey League
- Founded: 1991
- Home arena: Asheville Civic Center Arena
- Colors: Monza, gulf blue, honeysuckle

Franchise history
- 1991–1998: Brantford Smoke
- 1998–2002: Asheville Smoke

Championships
- Division titles: 1 (2000–01)

The Asheville Smoke were a minor professional ice hockey team in the United Hockey League. Home games were played in the Asheville Civic Center in Asheville, North Carolina.

== Team history ==
The team played in Asheville, North Carolina, from 1998 to 2002. The Smoke were coached by Keith Gretzky from 1998 to 2000. Prior to the 1998 relocation to Asheville, the team was known as the Brantford Smoke. The closest rival of Asheville were the Knoxville Speed. Original employees of the team included majority team owner and president Dan Wilhelm and assistant general manager Jeff Young.

In three of their four seasons played, the Smoke finished with a near 0.500 record each season. In the 2000 season, the team recorded 45 wins against 22 losses, and made it to the championship before losing to the Quad City Mallards. Overall, in four seasons, the team recorded a record of 151 wins and 129 losses.

The Civic Center facility was considered outdated which was a challenge for the team, and while other teams using the facility were allowed to keep the concession revenues, the Smoke had to turn these funds over to the city. A similar arrangement existed with the facility fee. Further, the 2002 bankruptcy of their geographic rival in Knoxville left the team with no nearby teams in the league. Smoke owner Dan Wilhelm also had a minority ownership in the Speed, which was primarily owned by his brother Andrew Wilhelm. Sharing the facility also resulted in the Smoke's games being given less than optimal time slots. Attendance during the inaugural season averaged 3,362 but fell to just over 2,500 in the 2001–02 season, ranking 11th out of the 14 UHL teams. An attempt to hold a raffle to help the team finish the 2001–02 season raised legal concerns.

Despite efforts to save the team, the franchise folded in 2002. However, the team's successes led to the creation of the Asheville Aces in 2004 as a member of the more regional Southern Professional Hockey League. Although the team was active in Asheville for four seasons, they inspired at least two popular local songs: "Asheville Smoke" by GFE and "Blood On The Ice" by The Monsters of Japan.
