= Knoxville Speed =

- City: Knoxville, Tennessee
- League: United Hockey League
- Founded: 1995
- Home arena: James White Civic Coliseum
- Colors: Red, blue, orange, black
- Owner: Andrew Wilhelm

Franchise history
- 1995–1999: Madison Monsters
- 1999–2002: Knoxville Speed

The Knoxville Speed was a minor professional ice hockey team in the United Hockey League (UHL) based in Knoxville, Tennessee with home games at the James White Civic Coliseum. They were formerly the Madison Monsters, before team owner Andrew Wilhelm announced that the franchise would relocate to Knoxville due to low attendance in Madison, Wisconsin, in April 1999.

Due to their geographic isolation from the rest of the league, the Speed and Asheville Smoke played each other roughly nineteen times in a season plus the playoffs, leading to a rivalry that involved bench-clearing brawls. The Smoke were primarily owned by the Speed's co-owner, Dan Wilhelm, Andrew Wilhelm's brother.

The team filed for Chapter 11 bankruptcy during the 2001–02 season and did not return. The team was replaced in Knoxville the following season by the Knoxville Ice Bears, which joined the new southern United States based Atlantic Coast Hockey League and became one of the founding members of the Southern Professional Hockey League.
