= Rockford IceHogs (UHL) =

Defunct American ice hockey team in United Hockey League

- City: Rockford, Illinois
- League: United Hockey League
- Division: Western Division
- Founded: 1991
- Operated: 1999–2007
- Home arena: Rockford MetroCentre
- Colors: Red, black, white
- Head coach: Steve Martinson
- Affiliates: Nashville Predators (NHL); Milwaukee Admirals (AHL)

Franchise history
- 1991–1993: Thunder Bay Thunder Hawks
- 1993–1996: Thunder Bay Senators
- 1996–1999: Thunder Bay Thunder Cats
- 1999–2007: Rockford IceHogs

Championships
- Division titles: 1 (2005–06)
- Colonial Cups: 1 (2007)

The Rockford IceHogs were a minor professional ice hockey team in Rockford, Illinois. They were a member of the United Hockey League from 1999 to 2007. The IceHogs played their home games at the MetroCentre. In 2007, the name and logo were purchased and applied to the current American Hockey League franchise. After the transfer of the name and logo to the AHL franchise was complete, the UHL IceHogs ceased operations.

The IceHogs began play in October 1999. The team name, IceHogs, was selected during a "name-the-team" contest. The team came to Rockford when United Sports Ventures bought the rights of the Thunder Bay Thunder Cats UHL franchise, one of the original franchises in the Colonial Hockey League in 1991 as the Thunder Bay Thunder Hawks. On October 23, 2002, Tri Vision Sports purchased the franchise from United Sports Ventures.

The IceHogs and Nashville Predators of the National Hockey League signed an affiliation agreement on December 13, 2005. The IceHogs supplied players to Nashville's primary affiliate, the Milwaukee Admirals of the American Hockey League. The IceHogs hired Steve Martinson as head coach for the 2004–05 season, and he led the IceHogs to their best season in franchise history, winning their first division championship. The IceHogs were also named the 2004–05 and 2005–06 UHL Member Franchise of the Year for the club's success on and off the ice. During the 2006–07 season, the IceHogs played in the UHL's Western Division with the Quad City Mallards, Chicago Hounds, Bloomington PrairieThunder, and Fort Wayne Komets. The Ice Hogs won their only Colonial Cup in game seven at home on May 24, 2007, by a score of 3–1 against the Kalamazoo Wings.

Every year the team held a "Jersey Night" during which the team wore a special, one-off alternate jersey and auctioned them off for charity. Many of the alternate jerseys were related to cultural icons such as Elvis Presley and St. Patrick's Day, or were autographed by Rockford-area celebrities such as Rick Nielsen.

The UHL IceHogs were replaced by an American Hockey League team of the same name for the 2007–08 season. The MetroCentre purchased the IceHogs name and logo from Tri Vision Sports and applied them to the new AHL franchise. The new team had also signed a ten-year player development contract with the Chicago Blackhawks.

== Season-by-season results ==
Season	GP	W	L	SOL	Pts	GF	GA	PIM	Playoffs
1999–00	74	32	34	8	72	238	268	1712	Lost in 1st Round
2000–01	74	30	38	6	66	207	256	1596	Did not qualify
2001–02	74	27	41	6	60	234	278	1631	Did not qualify
2002–03	76	35	34	7	77	233	271	1698	Lost in 1st Round
2003–04	76	28	43	5	61	215	294	1821	Did not qualify
2004–05	80	46	25	9	101	246	203	2243	Lost in 2nd round
2005–06	76	49	19	9	105	292	213	2592	Lost in 2nd round
2006–07	76	48	21	7	103	266	193	2132	Won the Colonial Cup

Season results were compiled from hockeydb.com and Pointstreak.com.
