= 1994–95 Colonial Hockey League season =

1994–95 CoHL season
- Finals champions: Thunder Bay Senators

Seasons
- ← 1993–94 1995–96 →

The 1994–95 Colonial Hockey League season was the fourth season of the Colonial Hockey League, a North American minor professional league. Eight teams participated in the regular season and the Thunder Bay Senators won the league title.

== Regular season ==
East Division	GP	W	L	T	GF	GA	Pts
Thunder Bay Senators	74	48	22	4	341	279	100
London Wildcats	74	34	38	2	341	380	70
Utica Blizzard	74	31	38	5	299	349	67
Brantford Smoke	74	26	36	12	299	357	64

West Division	GP	W	L	T	GF	GA	Pts
Detroit Falcons	74	45	27	2	329	273	92
Muskegon Fury	74	42	27	5	333	286	89
Saginaw Wheels	74	36	31	7	306	321	79
Flint Generals	74	34	34	6	350	353	74

== Colonial Cup-Playoffs ==
Colonial Cup-Quarterfinals
E1	Thunder Bay Senators
Bye
W3	Saginaw Wheels	4
W4	Flint Generals	2
W1	Detroit Falcons	4
E3	Utica Blizzard	2
W2	Muskegon Fury	4
E2	London Wildcats	1

Colonial Cup-Semifinals
E1	Thunder Bay Senators	4
W3	Saginaw Wheels	1
W1	Detroit Falcons	2
W2	Muskegon Fury	4

Colonial Cup-Final
E1	Thunder Bay Senators	4
W2	Muskegon Fury	2
