= Quad City Mallards (1995–2007) =

- City: Moline, Illinois
- League: United Hockey League
- Founded: 1995
- Folded: 2007
- Home arena: The MARK of the Quad Cities
- Colors: Forest green, burgundy, yellow
- Owner: Quad City Sports Ventures
- Media: WFXN (AM 1230)

Franchise history
- 1995–2007: Quad City Mallards

Championships
- Regular season titles: 4 (1997–98, 1999–00, 2000–01, 2001–02)
- Colonial Cups: 3 (1997, 1998, 2001)

The Quad City Mallards were a minor professional ice hockey team in the United Hockey League. The Mallards played their home games at The MARK of the Quad Cities in Moline, Illinois. They won the Colonial Cup playoff championship in 1997, 1998, and 2001, as well as the Tarry Cup regular season championship in 1998, 2000, 2001, and 2002. The Mallards won 50 or more games in six consecutive seasons, from 1996–97 to 2001–02, a professional hockey record. They were also known for never having missed the playoffs in their years of existence. Historically, the Mallards enjoyed spirited rivalries with the Flint Generals, Muskegon Fury, and Rockford IceHogs.

In response to the Calgary Flames's decision to relocate their American Hockey League affiliate from Omaha, Nebraska, to Moline before the start of the 2007–08 season, the Mallards announced that they would cease operations. The franchise that replaced them, the Quad City Flames, lasted two seasons before that team moved to Abbotsford, British Columbia, in 2009. Former team owner Chris Lencheski, along with business partner Steve Ryan, brought the Mallards back to the Quad Cities in the International Hockey League in 2009.

== Championships ==
Year	League	Trophy
1997	Colonial Hockey League	Colonial Cup
1998	United Hockey League	Colonial Cup
2001	United Hockey League	Colonial Cup

== Season-by-season results ==
Season	GP	W	L	OTL	Pts	GF	GA	PIM	Playoffs
Colonial Hockey League
1995–96	74	30	39	5	65	269	311	2372	Lost in first round
1996–97	74	51	20	3	105	384	245	1846	Won Championship
United Hockey League
1997–98	74	55	18	1	111	360	257	2204	Won Championship
1998–99	74	50	19	5	105	364	253	2514	Lost in finals
1999–00	74	53	16	5	111	341	216	2018	Lost in finals
2000–01	74	55	12	7	117	369	264	2373	Won Championship
2001–02	74	57	15	2	116	296	175	1810	Lost in second round
2002–03	76	41	25	10	92	281	240	1738	Lost in finals
2003–04	76	50	20	6	106	287	220	1653	Lost in first round
2004–05	80	39	30	11	89	226	228	1990	Lost in first round
2005–06	76	41	27	8	90	224	213	1452	Lost in first round
2006–07	76	37	28	11	85	269	264	1932	Lost in first round
Total	902	559	269	74	1192	3670	2886	23902	

- Season results were compiled from hockeydb.com and Pointstreak.com.

== Coaches ==
Years	Coach	Wins	Championships
1995–1996	Brad Buetow	30	0
1996–1997	John Anderson	51	1
1997–1999	Paul Gillis	105	1
1999–2000	Matt Shaw	53	0
2000–2002	Paul MacLean	112	1
2002–2005	Paul Gillis	130	0
2005–2007	Brian Curran	78	0

- Season results were compiled from hockeydb.com .

== Retired numbers ==
- #22 - Mark McFarlane
- #77 - Kerry Toporowski
- #55 - Steve Gibson
- #18 - Glenn Stewart
- #16 - Hugo Proulx
- #31 - Nate Berglund
