= 1992–93 Colonial Hockey League season =

1992–93 CoHL season
- Finals champions: Brantford Smoke

Seasons
- ← 1991–92 1993–94 →

The 1992–93 Colonial Hockey League]season was the second season of the Colonial Hockey League, a North American minor professional league. Seven teams participated in the regular season and the Brantford Smoke won the league title.

== Regular season ==
	GP	W	L	T	GF	GA	Pts
Brantford Smoke	60	39	18	3	308	264	81
Detroit Falcons	60	36	20	4	303	239	76
Thunder Bay Thunder Hawks	60	32	24	4	288	271	68
Muskegon Fury	60	28	27	5	293	278	61
St. Thomas Wildcats	60	27	27	6	306	322	60
Flint Bulldogs	60	27	29	4	256	296	58
Chatham Wheels	60	21	35	4	260	344	46

== Colonial Cup-Playoffs ==
=== First round (best-of-seven series) ===
- Brantford Smoke defeated Flint Bulldogs 4–2
- St. Thomas Wildcats defeated Detroit Falcons 4–2
- Thunder Bay Thunder Hawks defeated Muskegon Fury 4–3

=== Round robin qualifiers ===
- St. Thomas Wildcats defeated Brantford Smoke 4–0
- Thunder Bay Thunder Hawks defeated Brantford Smoke 5–2
- St. Thomas Wildcats defeated Thunder Bay Thunder Hawks 5–3
- St. Thomas Wildcats defeated Thunder Bay Thunder Hawks 6–3
- Brantford Smoke defeated Thunder Bay Thunder Hawks 10–2
- Brantford Smoke defeated St. Thomas Wildcats 6–2

=== Final ===
- Brantford Smoke defeated St. Thomas Wildcats 4–1 in a best-of-seven series
