= Flint Bulldogs =

- City: Flint, Michigan
- League: Colonial Hockey League
- Founded: 1991
- Home arena: IMA Sports Arena
- Colors: Red, yellow, black, white

Franchise history
- 1991–1993: Flint Bulldogs
- 1993–1994: Utica Bulldogs

The Flint Bulldogs were a professional hockey team in Flint, Michigan, from 1991 to 1993. They were a part of the Colonial Hockey League (CoHL) and played their home games at the IMA Sports Arena. They compiled an overall record of 47–66–7 (.421). After the 1993 season, the Bulldogs relocated to Utica, New York, and became the Utica Bulldogs, but were taken over by the league partway through the 1993–94 season due to mismanagement of general manager Skip Probst. The following season, the league awarded a new team to Utica called the Utica Blizzard.
