= 1995–96 Colonial Hockey League season =

Fifth season of the Colonial Hockey League

1995–96 CoHL season
- Finals champions: Flint Generals

Seasons
- ← 1994–95 1996–97 →

The 1995–96 Colonial Hockey League season was the fifth season of the Colonial Hockey League, a North American minor professional league. Nine teams participated in the regular season and the Flint Generals won the league title.

== Regular season ==
East Division	GP	W	L	T	GF	GA	Pts
Flint Generals	74	51	18	5	347	248	107
Brantford Smoke	74	45	24	5	336	283	95
Detroit Falcons	74	33	32	9	275	310	75
Saginaw Wheels	74	32	35	7	299	341	71
Utica Blizzard	74	29	39	6	285	339	64

West Division	GP	W	L	T	GF	GA	Pts
Muskegon Fury	74	40	27	7	273	248	87
Thunder Bay Senators	74	36	26	12	302	289	84
Madison Monsters	74	37	30	7	267	284	81
Quad City Mallards	74	30	39	5	269	311	65

== Colonial Cup-Playoffs ==
Colonial Cup-Quarterfinals
E1	Flint Generals	4
W4	Quad City Mallards	0
W1	Muskegon Fury	1
E3	Detroit Falcons	4
W2	Thunder Bay Senators	4
W3	Madison Monsters	2
E2	Brantford Smoke	4
E4	Saginaw Wheels	1

Colonial Cup-Semifinals
E1	Flint Generals	4
E3	Detroit Falcons	1
W2	Thunder Bay Senators	4
E2	Brantford Smoke	3

Colonial Cup-Final
E1	Flint Generals	4
W2	Thunder Bay Senators	2
