= Detroit Falcons (CoHL) =

- City: Fraser, Michigan
- League: Colonial Hockey League
- Founded: 1991
- Home arena: Fraser Ice Arena
- Colors: Red, yellow, black, white

Franchise history
- 1991–1992: Michigan Falcons
- 1992–1996: Detroit Falcons
- 1996–2002: Port Huron Border Cats

The Detroit Falcons were a minor professional ice hockey team based in Fraser, Michigan, from 1991 to 1996. For the 1991–92 season, they were known as the Michigan Falcons. They were a member of the Colonial Hockey League, and served as an affiliate team of the Detroit Red Wings and their farm team, the Adirondack Red Wings. After five seasons in Fraser, the franchise relocated to Port Huron, Michigan, where it was renamed the Port Huron Border Cats.

== Season-by-season record ==
Season	GP	W	L	OTL	Pts	GF	GA	PIM	Standing	Playoffs
1991–92	60	34	22	4	75	296	257	1405	1st, League	Lost semifinals vs. St. Thomas Wildcats 1–4
1992–93	60	36	20	4	76	303	239	1461	2nd, League	Lost first round vs. St. Thomas Wildcats 2–4
1993–94	64	34	25	5	73	296	275	1629	3rd, West Division	Lost quarterfinals vs. Flint Generals 1–3
1994–95	74	45	27	2	92	329	273	1696	1st, West Division	Won quarterfinals vs. Utica Blizzard 3–2; Lost semifinals vs. Muskegon Fury 2–4
1995–96	74	33	32	9	75	275	310	2545	3rd, East Division	Won quarterfinals vs. Fury 4–1; Lost semifinals vs. Flint Generals 1–4
