= 1991–92 Colonial Hockey League season =

1991–92 CoHL season
- Finals champions: Thunder Bay Thunder Hawks

Seasons
- ← Inaugural 1992–93 →

The 1991–92 Colonial Hockey League season was the first season of the Colonial Hockey League, a North American minor professional league. Five teams participated in the regular season, and the Thunder Bay Thunder Hawks won the league title.

== Teams ==
1991-92 Colonial Hockey League
Team	City	Arena
Brantford Smoke	Brantford, Ontario	Brantford Civic Centre
Flint Bulldogs	Flint, Michigan	IMA Sports Arena
Michigan Falcons	Fraser, Michigan	Fraser Ice Arena
St. Thomas Wildcats	St. Thomas, Ontario	St. Thomas Memorial Arena
Thunder Bay Thunder Hawks	Thunder Bay, Ontario	Fort William Gardens

== Regular season ==
	GP	W	L	T	GF	GA	Pts
Michigan Falcons	60	34	22	4	296	257	75
Brantford Smoke	60	34	22	4	327	265	72
Thunder Bay Thunder Hawks	60	26	28	6	309	289	62
St. Thomas Wildcats	60	24	29	7	263	288	57
Flint Bulldogs	60	20	37	3	272	368	45

== Colonial Cup-Playoffs ==
Colonial Cup-Semifinals
2	Brantford	2
3	Thunder Bay	4
1	Michigan	1
4	St. Thomas	4

Colonial Cup-Final
3	Thunder Bay	4
4	St. Thomas	3
