= St. Thomas Wildcats =

- City: St. Thomas, Ontario
- League: Colonial Hockey League
- Founded: 1991
- Folded: 2001
- Home arena: St. Thomas-Elgin Memorial Centre
- Colours: Yellow, black, white

Franchise history
- 1991–1994: St. Thomas Wildcats
- 1994–1995: London Wildcats
- 1996–1997: Dayton Ice Bandits
- 1998–2001: Mohawk Valley Prowlers

The team's logo and new colors in London.

The St. Thomas Wildcats were a minor professional ice hockey team in the Colonial Hockey League (CoHL) and played at the St. Thomas-Elgin Memorial Centre in St. Thomas, Ontario. The team was a founding member of the league and was owned by Doug Tarry, Sr. and later by Doug Tarry, Jr., who went on to purchase the London Knights in 1994. The team moved to nearby London, Ontario, in 1994 and became the London Wildcats with red and blue colours. After playing in London for the 1994–95 season, the franchise suspended operations for one year before moving to Dayton, Ohio, and becoming the Dayton Ice Bandits.

The Wildcats were Colonial Cup runners-up both in 1992 (losing to the Thunder Bay Thunder Cats) and 1993 (losing to the Brantford Smoke). The team's NHL affiliations were the Buffalo Sabres and St. Louis Blues.

During the 1992–93 season, the Wildcats were involved in two major incidents. The first was during the second round of the playoffs when the Thunder Bay Thunder Cats players went into the stands after their coach was doused with beer by a fan. Players involved included Mel Angelstad and Bryan Wells. During the final round of the playoffs against the Brantford Smoke, the two teams engaged in a bench-clearing brawl after the second game of the series after the Wildcats' Kent Hawley was speared when he went to pick up the game puck following the final whistle. All players were involved, including all four goaltenders.

== See also ==
- List of ice hockey teams in Ontario
