= Thunder Bay Thunder Cats =

- City: Thunder Bay, Ontario
- League: CoHL/UHL
- Founded: 1991
- Operated: 1994–1999
- Home arena: Fort William Gardens
- Colours: Brown, navy, white

Franchise history
- 1991–1993: Thunder Bay Thunder Hawks
- 1993–1996: Thunder Bay Senators
- 1996–1999: Thunder Bay Thunder Cats
- 1999–2007: Rockford IceHogs

Championships
- Regular season titles: 2 (1993–94, 1994–95)
- Playoff championships: 3 (1992, 1994, 1995)

The Thunder Bay Thunder Cats were a minor professional ice hockey team based in Thunder Bay, Ontario, Canada, and a member of the United Hockey League. The team went through a number of different names prior to being the Thunder Cats, including the Thunder Bay Thunder Hawks and the Thunder Bay Senators.

== History ==
After the success of the five-time Allan Cup champion Thunder Bay Twins, the Colonial Hockey League (CoHL) took interest in expanding to the Northwestern Ontario city. In 1991, the CoHL introduced the Thunder Bay Thunder Hawks, spelling the end of the 21-year Twins franchise that stepped aside for the new minor professional team. In 1993, the team changed its name to the Thunder Bay Senators to reflect the teams affiliation with the National Hockey League's Ottawa Senators. After three seasons as the Senators, the team became the Thunder Bay Thunder Cats in 1996. The CoHL changed its name to the United Hockey League (UHL) in 1997.

After eight seasons in Thunder Bay, the Thunder Cats were bought, moved to Rockford, Illinois, and renamed the Rockford IceHogs in 1999.

== Season-by-season results ==
Season	GP	W	L	T	OTL	GF	GA	Pts	Final standing	Playoffs
1991–92	60	26	28	6	—	309	289	62	3rd CoHL	Won Championship
1992–93	60	32	24	4	—	288	271	68	3rd CoHL	Lost semi-final
1993–94	64	45	15	4	—	331	236	94	1st CoHL	Won Championship
1994–95	74	48	22	4	—	341	279	100	1st CoHL	Won Championship
1995–96	74	36	26	12	—	302	289	84	4th CoHL	Lost Championship
1996–97	74	43	23	8	—	333	266	94	4th CoHL	Lost semi-final
1997–98	74	42	26	0	6	337	304	90	4th UHL	Lost quarter-final
1998–99	74	47	20	0	7	325	247	101	3rd UHL	Lost semi-final
