= Utica Blizzard =

- City: Utica, New York
- League: Colonial Hockey League
- Founded: 1994
- Home arena: Utica Memorial Auditorium
- Colors: Red, blue, black, white

Franchise history
- 1994–1997: Utica Blizzard
- 1997–1999: Winston-Salem IceHawks
- 1999–2004: Adirondack IceHawks
- 2004–2006: Adirondack Frostbite

The Utica Blizzard were a professional ice hockey team from Utica, New York, and member of the Colonial Hockey League (CoHL) from 1994 to 1997. The Blizzard replaced the Utica Bulldogs after the team had to be taken over by the league in the middle of the previous season due to mismanagement. The Blizzard were owned by Jeff Croop and Ric Seiling was the team's first head coach, who also appeared in one of the team's games as emergency replacement player.

In 1997, the team and Utica Memorial Auditorium did not come to terms on new lease agreement and relocated to Winston-Salem, North Carolina, as the Winston-Salem IceHawks for the 1997–98 season.
