= Brantford Smoke =

- City: Brantford, Ontario
- League: United Hockey League
- Founded: 1991
- Home arena: Brantford Civic Centre
- Colours: Cardinal, meteorite, black, white

Franchise history
- 1991–1998: Brantford Smoke
- 1998–2002: Asheville Smoke

Championships
- Colonial Cups: 1 (1993)

The Brantford Smoke were a minor professional ice hockey team in the Colonial Hockey League and the United Hockey League. They played in Brantford, Ontario, from 1991–92 (the league's inaugural season) until 1997–98, playing home games at the Brantford Civic Centre.

They won the Colonial Cup in 1993, beating the St. Thomas Wildcats in a series that included a bench brawl in a game in St. Thomas. Prominent players included goalie Mark Laforest, who played 98 games in the National Hockey League, and Cory Banika, who was called up to play for the St. John's Maple Leafs of the American Hockey League. In 1998, they moved to Asheville, North Carolina, as the Asheville Smoke.
