= Flint Generals =

- City: Flint, Michigan
- League: International Hockey League
- Founded: 1993
- Folded: 2010
- Home arena: Perani Arena
- Colors: Navy blue, gold
- Owner: Franke Family
- Head coach: Jason Muzzatti
- Media: WFNT(1470 AM) Flint Journal

Franchise history
- 1993–2010: Flint Generals

Championships
- Regular season titles: 2 (1996, 1997)
- Colonial Cups: 2 (1996, 2000)

The Flint Generals were a minor professional ice hockey team based in Flint, Michigan. They were a member of the International Hockey League and played their home games at the Industrial Mutual Association (IMA) Sports Arena. The Generals won two league championships Colonial Cups in the Colonial Hockey League and United Hockey League.

== History ==
Flint had been home to minor professional hockey in some incarnation since 1969, except for a one-year break in the 1990–91 season. This incarnation of the Flint Generals came about in the 1993–94 season after the Colonial Hockey League's (CoHL) Flint Bulldogs owner Skip Probst moved the Bulldogs from Flint to Utica, New York. The following summer, Dr. Khaled M. Shukairy was granted an expansion franchise in the CoHL to play in Flint.

After a fan vote, "Generals" had been voted on by the fans to be the name of the new franchise after the original Generals' team that relocated to Saginaw in 1985. Flint won their first Colonial Cup against the Thunder Bay Senators in the 1995–96 season, in which the Generals claimed the championship in a six-game upset and won the final game by a score of 9–0. This team included such players as Kevin Kerr, who would later break the all-time minor league hockey scoring record and coach the Generals; Robin Bouchard, who was traded early the next season in a lopsided trade that did not favor the Generals; Andrei Mezin, the goalie who would go on to play for his native Belarus in the Olympics and upset Sweden; and female goaltender, Erin Whitten.

The second Colonial Cup came in a 4–0 sweep of the Generals rival, the Quad City Mallards, in 2000. The Generals were coached by former NHL player Doug Shedden. They included former NHL players Bobby Reynolds, Mark Major, and Nick Stajduhar, as well as two 100 point scorers in Ross Wilson and Don Parsons, UHL Defenseman of the Year Gary Roach, late-season additions Cory Cyrenne and Vladimir Serov, and goalie Mark Richards. Serov and Cyrenne totaled 60 points in 37 regular season games, and in the 2000 finals, Serov scored the game-winning goal with 50 seconds left in game three and the game-winning goal with 3:52 left in game four to preserve the victories for the Generals.

After several years of mediocre hockey and questionable ownership, the Generals finished the 2009–10 season on a hot streak, clinching the final Turner Cup playoff berth on the season's final day. The Generals faced the Muskegon Lumberjacks in the first round of the Turner Cup playoffs, and after falling behind three games to one, came back to win the series in seven games. The Generals then fell to the Fort Wayne Komets in a five-game series; the Generals' only win in the series was a 7–6 overtime win in Game 3. Despite the turnaround in 2009–10 and rumors of more stable ownership taking over, the Generals folded when Perani Arena management decided to give the arena lease to the junior Michigan Warriors of the North American Hockey League.

== Championships ==
Year	League	Trophy
1995–96	Colonial Hockey League	Tarry Cup
1995–96	Colonial Hockey League	Colonial Cup
1996–97	Colonial Hockey League	Tarry Cup
1999–00	United Hockey League	Colonial Cup

== Season-by-season results ==
Season	League	GP	W	L	T	OTL	SOL	Pts	GF	GA	Standing	Playoffs
1993–94	CoHL	64	32	23	9	—	—	73	328	314	4th, West	Lost in round 2
1994–95	CoHL	74	34	34	6	—	—	74	350	353	4th, West	Lost in round 1
1995–96	CoHL	74	51	18	5	—	—	107	347	248	1st, East	Won Colonial Cup
1996–97	CoHL	74	55	18	1	—	—	111	371	232	1st, East	Lost in Finals
1997–98	UHL	74	46	22	—	6	—	98	371	278	1st, East	Lost in Finals
1998–99	UHL	74	37	32	—	5	—	79	318	299	3rd, Central	Lost in round 2
1999–2000	UHL	74	51	14	—	9	—	111	379	250	1st, Central	Won Colonial Cup
2000–01	UHL	74	30	34	—	10	—	70	253	303	4th, West	Did not qualify
2001–02	UHL	74	42	26	—	6	—	90	294	245	4th, West	Lost in round 1
2002–03	UHL	76	32	36	—	8	—	72	257	298	5th, East	Did not qualify
2003–04	UHL	76	39	27	—	10	—	88	253	244	2nd, East	Lost in round 1
2004–05	UHL	80	33	33	—	14	—	80	237	236	4th, Central	Did not qualify
2005–06	UHL	76	31	35	—	—	10	72	236	294	4th, Central	Did not qualify
2006–07	UHL	76	33	34	—	—	9	75	250	286	3rd, Eastern	Lost in round 1
2007–08	IHL	76	34	28	—	5	9	82	271	276	3rd, League	Lost in round 1
2008–09	IHL	76	22	47	—	2	5	51	241	359	6th, League	Did not qualify
2009–10	IHL	76	33	36	—	3	4	73	234	257	4th, League	Lost in Finals
Totals		1268	635	497	21	78	37	1406	4990	4772		

== Retired numbers ==
- #1 — Bob Perani
- #5 — Stephan Brochu
- #16 — Doug Manchak
- #20 — Kevin Kerr
- #77 — Brett MacDonald
