= Muskegon Lumberjacks (2008–2010) =

Ice hockey team

- City: Muskegon, Michigan
- League: International Hockey League
- Founded: 1992
- Operated: 2008–2010
- Home arena: L. C. Walker Arena
- Colors: Black, gold, white
- Owner(s): Jeff and Stacey Patulski
- General manager: Tim Taylor
- Head coach: Rich Kromm
- Media: WLAW (92.5)
- Affiliates: AHL (higher): Grand Rapids Griffins; AAHL (lower): Battle Creek Revolution; Evansville IceMen

Franchise history
- 1992–2008: Muskegon Fury
- 2008–2010: Muskegon Lumberjacks
- 2010–2016: Evansville IceMen
- 2017–present: Jacksonville Icemen

Championships
- Regular season titles: 2 (1998–99, 2004–05)
- Division titles: 4 (1996, 1999, 2005, 2007)
- Colonial Cups: 4 (1999, 2002, 2004, 2005)

The Muskegon Lumberjacks was an International Hockey League ice hockey team located in Muskegon, Michigan. After the 2010 season, the team folded and Ron Geary, the owner of the Evansville IceMen of the AAHL, purchased the franchise rights of the former Muskegon Lumberjacks from the IHL. Geary then moved the franchise to Evansville, Indiana where they became the Evansville IceMen.

== Muskegon Fury (1992–2008) ==
The Muskegon Fury were an International Hockey League ice hockey team located in Muskegon, Michigan. The team's colors were teal, purple, and black. The Fury were established in 1992 after the original Muskegon Lumberjacks of the previous International Hockey League relocated to Cleveland, Ohio. Up to that point, hockey had been in Muskegon for 32 consecutive seasons and Tony Lisman, owner and president of the Fury, would not let that tradition end. Lisman kept his vow to keep hockey in Muskegon by establishing the Fury in the one-season-old Colonial Hockey League (CoHL).

The Fury made it to the Colonial Cup finals in their third season after losing in the first round of the playoffs after their first two seasons. However, they lost to the Thunder Bay Senators in six games. In the 1995–96 season, they won their division but were upset in the first round to the Detroit Falcons in five games. Erin Whitten, one of the few female hockey players to play professionally, played for the Fury during the 1995–96 season before being traded to the Flint Generals.

The CoHL was renamed the United Hockey League in 1997. In the 1998–99 season, the Fury finished with the best record during the regular season and won their first Colonial Cup by defeating the Quad City Mallards in six games. The Fury would win their second title in 2002. Despite finishing third in their division during the 2003–04 season, the Fury would win their third championship by going undefeated through all eleven games of the three playoff series to claiming the Colonial Cup. They won the regular season championship in 2004–05 and a back-to-back Colonial Cup championship.

On August 30, 2006, Bruce Ramsay was named the head coach for the 2006–07 season, replacing Todd Nelson who had accepted the assistant coaching position for the Chicago Wolves a few days earlier after three head coaching seasons in Muskegon.

In 2007, the United Hockey League changed names again to the International Hockey League in honor of the now defunct league.

== Return of the Lumberjacks ==
On September 12, 2008, new owners Stacey Patulskey, Jeff Patulskey and Tim Taylor changed the team's name from the Muskegon Fury to the Lumberjacks to reflect back on what many remember as the glory days of hockey in Muskegon.

Head coach Bruce Ramsay resigned after the 2008–09 season to become the head coach of the Tulsa Oilers in the Central Hockey League. Ramsay was replaced for the 2009–10 season by Rich Kromm.

On February 8, 2010 it was announced that the Lumberjacks franchise would fold following the 2009–10 season. The announcement coincided with the United States Hockey League awarding an expansion team to Muskegon taking on the name Muskegon Lumberjacks. On June 23, 2010, the International Hockey League announced that Ron Geary had finalized the transaction to purchase the Muskegon Lumberjacks' IHL franchise from the IHL and move it to Evansville, Indiana, as the Evansville IceMen at the conclusion of the 2009–10 IHL season. However, the IHL would not play another season and the remaining teams, including the new IceMen, joined the Central Hockey League.

From 2008 to 2010, the Lumberjacks were affiliated with the Grand Rapids Griffins of the American Hockey League (AHL). In 2008, the Evansville IceMen of the All American Hockey League (AAHL) served as a farm team affiliate. In 2009, the Battle Creek Revolution of the AAHL served as the farm team affiliate.

== Championships ==
Year	League	Trophy
1998–99	UHL	Colonial Cup
2001–02	UHL	Colonial Cup
2003–04	UHL	Colonial Cup
2004–05	UHL	Colonial Cup

NOTE: The league's name has changed over the years from the Colonial Hockey League (until 1997), United Hockey League (1997–2007), and the International Hockey League (2007–2010).
