= United Hockey League =

1991–2010 North American ice hockey league

- Logo of the UHL from 1997–2006
- Sport: Ice hockey
- Founded: 1991; 35 years ago
- Folded: 2010; 16 years ago
- Replaced by: Central Hockey League (partial)
- Countries: United States; Canada
- Last champion: Fort Wayne Komets
- Most titles: Fort Wayne Komets & Muskegon Fury (4)

The United Hockey League (UHL), originally known as the Colonial Hockey League from 1991 to 1997 and last known as the International Hockey League from 2007 to 2010, was a low-level minor professional ice hockey league, with teams in the United States and Canada. The league was headquartered in Rochester, Michigan, and, in its last year, consisted of seven teams. It folded in 2010, with most of its teams joining the Central Hockey League. The Central Hockey League teams still operating in 2014 were then added to ECHL. The only former CoHL/UHL/IHL teams still active as of 2024 are the Fort Wayne Komets and Kalamazoo Wings.

== History ==
The UHL was originally formed in 1991 as the Colonial Hockey League and had teams in Brantford, Ontario; Detroit, Michigan; Flint, Michigan; St. Thomas, Ontario; and Thunder Bay, Ontario; the avowed goal of the league organizers was to fill the low-level niche in the Great Lakes area abandoned by the original International Hockey League as the latter league engaged in upmarket expansion. As time passed, the CoHL moved eastward, into places like Glens Falls, NY; Danbury, CT; Utica, NY; Binghamton, NY; and Richmond, VA. During that expansion, the league was renamed "United Hockey League" (UHL) and the headquarters was moved to Lake St. Louis, Missouri, in 1997.

The 2006–07 season was the last season of play for the league under the UHL name. Following the 2006–07 season, the league lost half of its ten teams. The franchises in Moline and Rockford, Illinois moved to the American Hockey League, the team in Elmira, New York, went to the ECHL, and the franchises in Chicago, Illinois and Port Huron, Michigan ceased operations. In June 2007, at the league’s annual meeting, the UHL announced that it was changing its name to the "International Hockey League" (IHL). Paul L. Pickard was named the first president and CEO of the new IHL. During that summer, the UHL headquarters moved from Lake St. Louis, Missouri, to Rochester, Michigan. The UHL's rebranding was intended to evoke the original IHL, which had ceased operations in 2001 and covered much of the new IHL's footprint. The Fort Wayne Komets were a longtime member of the original league while the Kalamazoo Wings and Flint Generals franchises were revived names of the original Kalamazoo and Flint IHL teams.

On July 13, 2010, the league announced an agreement with the Central Hockey League, the effects of which saw five IHL teams – the Bloomington PrairieThunder, Dayton Gems, Evansville IceMen, Fort Wayne Komets and Quad City Mallards – absorbed into the CHL. The remaining two franchises from the league's last season that were not absorbed into the CHL, the Flint Generals and the Port Huron Icehawks, folded.

== Governance ==
UHL's IHL logo from 2007 until 2010

Dennis Hextall was named as the president and commissioner of the International Hockey League on September 2, 2009. Hextall was preceded by Paul Pickard, who served as commissioner for the first two years of the renamed league (2007–2009).

Several UHL teams had affiliations with the National Hockey League, American Hockey League, and the All American Hockey League.

== Teams ==
Season	Teams	Expansion	Defunct	Suspended	Return from hiatus	Relocated	Name changes
Colonial Hockey League; 1991–92	5	Brantford Smoke; Flint Bulldogs; Michigan Falcons; Thunder Bay Thunder Hawks; St. Thomas Wildcats					
1992–93	7	Chatham Wheels; Muskegon Fury					Detroit Falcons (Michigan)
1993–94	8	Flint Generals				Flint → Utica Bulldogs	Thunder Bay Senators (Thunder Hawks)
1994–95	8	Utica Blizzard	Utica Bulldogs			Chatham → Saginaw Wheels; St. Thomas → London Wildcats	
1995–96	9	Quad City Mallards; Madison Monsters		London Wildcats			
1996–97	10				London Wildcats	Detroit → Port Huron Border Cats; London → Dayton Ice Bandits	Saginaw Lumber Kings (Wheels); Thunder Bay Thunder Cats (Senators)
United Hockey League; 1997–98	10	B.C. Icemen		Dayton Ice Bandits		Utica → Winston-Salem IceHawks	
1998–99	11				Dayton Ice Bandits	Brantford → Asheville Smoke; Dayton → Mohawk Valley Prowlers	Saginaw Gears (Lumber Kings)
1999–2000	14	Fort Wayne Komets; Madison Kodiaks; Missouri River Otters				Madison → Knoxville Speed; Thunder Bay → Rockford Icehogs; Winston-Salem → Adirondack IceHawks; Saginaw → Ohio Gears (mid-season)	
2000–01	15	Elmira Jackals; New Haven Knights	Ohio Gears; Mohawk Valley Prowlers (mid-season)			Madison → Kalamazoo Wings	
2001–02	14						
2002–03	10	Port Huron Beacons	Asheville Smoke; B.C. Icemen; Knoxville Speed; New Haven Knights; Port Huron Border Cats				
2003–04	12	Columbus Stars; Richmond RiverDogs	Columbus Stars (mid-season)				
2004–05	14	Danbury Trashers; Kansas City Outlaws; Motor City Mechanics					Adirondack Frostbite (IceHawks)
2005–06	14	Port Huron Flags	Kansas City Outlaws			Port Huron Beacons → Roanoke Valley Vipers	
2006–07	10	Bloomington PrairieThunder	Adirondack Frostbite; Danbury Trashers; Missouri River Otters; Motor City Mechanics; Roanoke Valley Vipers			Richmond → Chicago Hounds	
International Hockey; League; 2007–08	6	Port Huron Icehawks	Chicago Hounds; Elmira Jackals (moved to ECHL); Port Huron Flags; Quad City Mallards; Rockford IceHogs (Replaced by an AHL team)				
2008–09	6						Muskegon Lumberjacks (Fury)
2009–10	7	Dayton Gems; Quad City Mallards	Kalamazoo Wings (moved to ECHL)				
After 09–10 season	0 (League folded July 13, 2010)		Port Huron Icehawks (Folded June 10, 2010); Flint Generals (Folded June 10, 2010); Franchises merged into CHL: Bloomington PrairieThunder; Dayton Gems; Evansville IceMen; Fort Wayne Komets; Quad City Mallards			Muskegon Lumberjacks → Evansville IceMen (June 23, 2010)	

=== History of teams ===
- Adirondack Frostbite 2004–2006
- Adirondack IceHawks 1999–2004, later Adirondack Frostbite
- Asheville Smoke 1998–2002
- Arctic Xpress 2000–2001 (did not play), later Canton Xpress
- B.C. Icemen 1997–2002
- Bloomington PrairieThunder 2006–2010, merged into Central Hockey League
- Brantford Smoke 1991–1998, later Asheville Smoke
- Canton Ice Patrol 2002 (did not play)
- Canton Xpress 2001 – January 28, 2002 (did not play), later Canton Ice Patrol
- Chatham Wheels 1992–1994, later Saginaw Wheels
- Chicago Hounds 2006–2007
- Columbus Stars 2003 – January 9, 2004
- Danbury Trashers 2004–2006
- Dayton Gems 2009–2010, merged into Central Hockey League
- Dayton Ice Bandits 1996–1997, later Mohawk Valley Prowlers
- Detroit Falcons 1992–1996
- Elmira Jackals 2000–2007, moved to ECHL
- Evansville IceMen 2010, merged into Central Hockey League
- Flint Bulldogs 1991–1993, later Utica Bulldogs
- Flint Generals 1993–2010
- Fort Wayne Komets 1999–2010, merged into Central Hockey League
- Kalamazoo Wings 2000–2009, Wings moved to ECHL
- Kansas City Outlaws 2004–2005
- Knoxville Speed 1999–2002
- Lehigh Valley Xtreme 2000 (did not play)
- London Wildcats 1994–1995, later Dayton Ice Bandits
- Madison Kodiaks 1999–2000, later Kalamazoo Wings
- Madison Monsters 1995–1999, later Knoxville Speed
- Michigan Falcons 1991–1992, later Detroit Falcons
- Missouri River Otters 1999–2006
- Mohawk Valley Prowlers 1998–February 2001
- Motor City Mechanics 2004–2006
- Muskegon Fury 1992–2008, rebranded as Lumberjacks
- Muskegon Lumberjacks 2008–2010, later Evansville IceMen
- New Haven Knights 2000–2002
- Ohio Gears December 20, 1999 – 2000, later Arctic Xpress
- Port Huron Beacons 2002–2005, later Roanoke Valley Vipers
- Port Huron Border Cats 1996–2002
- Port Huron Icehawks 2007–2010
- Port Huron Flags 2005–2007
- Quad City Mallards 1995–2007
- Quad City Mallards 2009–2010, merged into Central Hockey League
- Richmond RiverDogs 2003–2006, later Chicago Hounds
- Roanoke Valley Vipers 2005–2006
- Rockford IceHogs 1999–2007, assets bought out by Rockford IceHogs of American Hockey League
- Saginaw Gears 1998 – December 19, 1999, later Ohio Gears
- Saginaw LumberKings 1996–1998, later Saginaw Gears
- Saginaw Wheels 1994–1996, later Saginaw LumberKings
- St. Thomas Wildcats 1991–1994, later London Wildcats
- Thunder Bay Senators 1993–1996, later Thunder Bay Thunder Cats
- Thunder Bay Thunder Cats 1996–1999, later Rockford IceHogs
- Thunder Bay Thunder Hawks 1991–1993, later Thunder Bay Senators
- Utica Bulldogs 1993–1994
- Utica Blizzard 1994–1997, later Winston-Salem IceHawks
- Winston-Salem IceHawks 1997–1999, later Adirondack IceHawks

== Colonial/Turner Cup champions ==
The Colonial Cup was the league's championship trophy. The name was changed to the Turner Cup in 2007 to reflect the original IHL's championship trophy, also named the Turner Cup.

- 1992 – Thunder Bay Thunder Hawks
- 1993 – Brantford Smoke
- 1994 – Thunder Bay Senators
- 1995 – Thunder Bay Senators
- 1996 – Flint Generals
- 1997 – Quad City Mallards
- 1998 – Quad City Mallards
- 1999 – Muskegon Fury
- 2000 – Flint Generals
- 2001 – Quad City Mallards
- 2002 – Muskegon Fury
- 2003 – Fort Wayne Komets
- 2004 – Muskegon Fury
- 2005 – Muskegon Fury
- 2006 – Kalamazoo Wings
- 2007 – Rockford IceHogs
- 2008 – Fort Wayne Komets
- 2009 – Fort Wayne Komets
- 2010 – Fort Wayne Komets

== Awards ==
- UHL Best Goaltender

== See also ==
- List of developmental and minor sports leagues
- List of ice hockey leagues
- Minor league
- Sports league attendances
