= Terry Marchant =

American ice hockey player (born 1976)

- Born: February 24, 1976 (age 50) Buffalo, New York, U.S.
- Height: 6 ft 1 in (185 cm)
- Weight: 205 lb (93 kg; 14 st 9 lb)
- Position: Centre
- Shot: Left
- Played for: Hamilton Bulldogs; Houston Aeros; London Knights; Baton Rouge Kingfish; Columbus Cottonmouths; Arkansas RiverBlades; Cincinnati Cyclones; Augusta Lynx; Texas Wildcatters; Flint Generals; New Mexico Scorpions; Fort Wayne Komets
- NHL draft: 136th overall, 1994; Edmonton Oilers
- Playing career: 1998–2008

Terry Marchant (born February 24, 1976) is an American former professional ice hockey player. He played in the minor leagues and briefly in Europe.

== Career Summary ==
Marchant began his collegiate career in 1994 with the Lake Superior State Lakers having previously played junior hockey with the Niagara Scenic of the NAHL. Following his strong season in Niagara, he was drafted 136th overall by the Edmonton Oilers in the 1994 NHL entry draft. In his sole season in Buffalo, Marchant was named as a Second Team All Star. Despite being a prolific scorer during his time in the juniors, when he arrived at Lake Superior State he focused on becoming a defensive forward. After his junior year however, the team's top scorer Bates Battaglia signed with the NHL's Carolina Hurricanes, which allowed Marchant to become more offensive-minded. As a result, in his senior season he led the team in scoring with 39 points in 36 games, whilst being named an alternate captain. As a result of his strong play, he was named to the All CCHA Second Team, as well as being named CCHA Best Defensive Forward.

Upon graduating university, Marchant signed with the Hamilton Bulldogs of the AHL, who served as the Oilers affiliate team. With the Bulldogs he scored 20 points in 47 games, as the Bulldogs qualified for the play-offs, ultimately losing in the quarterfinals to the Rochester Americans. His time in Hamilton was short-lived however, as the Oilers released him on September 12, 1999. Following his release, Marchant signed with the Houston Aeros of the IHL with whom he played during the 1999–00 season. With the Aeros Marchant tallied 24 points in 66 games as the team qualified for the play-offs, losing to the Chicago Wolves in the semi-finals. The following season, Marchant began with the Aeros, playing 6 games. In November 2000 he moved to Europe in order play for the London Knights of the BISL, where he was subsequently joined by former Aeroes team-mate Grant Richison. Whilst performing well in the league, the Knights would also find continental success, beating both the Munich Barons and HC Slovan Bratislava in the IIHF Continental Cup. Although Swiss side ZSC Lions would ultimately win the Cup, the Knights would take the silver medal and their performance in the competition was considered to be the best by a British team at the time.

He returned to North American the following season, signing with the Baton Rouge Kingfish of the ECHL. He scored 21 points in 26 games, before being waived by the team. He was without a team for only a short time however, as he was picked up a week later by the Columbus Cottonmouths, also of the ECHL. With the Cottonmouths he registered a further 26 points in 42 games. The following season Marchant remained in the ECHL, moving to the Arkansas RiverBlades where he found he played a more offensive game, scoring 68 points in 72 games. For the 2002–03 season, Marchant signed with the Cincinnati Cyclones, with whom he played until February 2004, when he was traded to the Augusta Lynx in exchange for Josh Bennett. His time in Augusta got off to an auspicious start, scoring a hat-trick in his debut game. He finished the season in Augusta, tallying 30 points in 28 games. He began the following season with the Lynx, before being acquired by the Texas Wildcatters, registering 20 points in 33 games.

The following season, Marchant signed for the Flint Generals of the UHL, where he had a career year, leading the team in points with 85 in 76 games. The 2006–07 season saw Marchant return to Flint, he was once again the team's leading scorer before being traded to the Fort Wayne Komets, in exchange for Bogdan Rudenko and Ryan Jorde. With the Komets he registered a further 15 points in 17 games as the team qualified for the play-offs, ultimately losing to the Rockford IceHogs. In addition to his time in the UHL, Marchant also played 3 games with the CHL's New Mexico Scorpions. Marchant remained with the Komets as the league rebranded itself to the IHL and registered 41 points in 66 games. The team again qualified for the play-offs, beating the Port Huron Icehawks in the Turner Cup finals.

== Awards and achievements ==
- NAHL Second Team All-Star (1994)
- NCAA (CCHA) Best Defensive Forward (1998)
- NCAA (CCHA) Second All CCHA Team (1998)
- IHL Turner Cup Champion (2008)

== Career statistics ==
=== Regular season and play-offs ===
			Regular season					Play-offs
Season	Team	League	GP	G	A	Pts	PIM	GP	G	A	Pts	PIM
1993-94	Niagara Scenic	NAHL	42	27	40	67	43	—	—	—	—	—
1994-95	Lake Superior State Lakers	CCHA	23	2	5	7	12	—	—	—	—	—
1995-96	Lake Superior State Lakers	CCHA	36	8	5	13	15	—	—	—	—	—
1996-97	Lake Superior State Lakers	CCHA	38	12	14	26	26	—	—	—	—	—
1997-98	Lake Superior State Lakers	CCHA	36	17	22	39	24	—	—	—	—	—
1998-99	Hamilton Bulldogs	AHL	47	12	8	20	7	2	1	0	1	0
1999-00	Houston Aeros	IHL	66	11	13	24	41	11	4	2	6	4
2000-01	Houston Aeros	IHL	6	1	0	1	4	—	—	—	—	—
2000-01	London Knights	BISL	29	5	11	16	12	8	4	5	9	4
2001-02	Baton Rouge Kingfish	ECHL	26	8	13	21	20	—	—	—	—	—
2001-02	Columbus Cottonmouths	ECHL	42	5	21	26	10	—	—	—	—	—
2002-03	Arkansas RiverBlades	ECHL	72	21	47	68	66	3	1	1	2	2
2003-04	Cincinnati Cyclones	ECHL	45	16	21	37	29	—	—	—	—	—
2003-04	Augusta Lynx	ECHL	28	14	16	30	10	—	—	—	—	—
2004-05	Augusta Lynx	ECHL	15	1	2	3	4	—	—	—	—	—
2004-05	Texas Wildcatters	ECHL	33	9	11	20	24	—	—	—	—	—
2005-06	Flint Generals	UHL	76	31	54	85	58	—	—	—	—	—
2006-07	New Mexico Scorpions	CHL	3	0	0	0	4	—	—	—	—	—
2006-07	Flint Generals	UHL	48	18	29	47	36	—	—	—	—	—
2006-07	Fort Wayne Komets	UHL	17	7	8	15	24	10	4	5	9	6
2007-08	Fort Wayne Komets	IHL	66	17	24	41	36	9	3	3	6	12
IHL totals			138	29	37	66	81	20	7	5	12	16
ECHL totals			261	74	131	205	163	3	1	2	2	0

== Personal life ==
Terry is the younger brother of fellow hockey player and Stanley Cup champion Todd Marchant. Together they previously ran the Todd Marchant Hockey School at the Northtown Center in Amherst, New York. Marchant now has 4 daughters McKenna, Emerson, Avery, and Reese. Since 2014 he has lived in Houston, Texas.
