= Grant Richison =

American ice hockey player (born 1967)

- Born: May 5, 1967 (age 59) Detroit, Michigan, U.S.
- Height: 6 ft 2 in (188 cm)
- Weight: 205 lb (93 kg; 14 st 9 lb)
- Position: Defenceman
- Shot: Left
- Played for: Moncton Hawks; Fort Wayne Komets; Muskegon Fury; Quad City Mallards; Orlando Solar Bears; Kansas City Blades; Houston Aeros; London Knights
- NHL draft: Undrafted
- Playing career: 1989–2001

Grant Richison (born May 5, 1967) is an American former ice hockey defenceman who played in the minor leagues, and in the United Kingdom.

== Playing career ==
Richison played collegiate hockey with the Calgary Dinosaurs in 1988, where he registered 14 points in 16 games. He subsequently turned pro.

Upon turning professional, Richison signed with AHL outfit Moncton Hawks for the 1989-90 season. The team would struggle, finishing 6th out of seven teams in their division, whilst Richison would score 12 points in 50 games. He returned to New Brunswick the following season, registering 13 points in 39 games. The team would make it to the playoffs, before losing to the Springfield Indians in the Division Finals.

In the off-season, Richison moved to the Fort Wayne Komets of the IHL, beginning his long association with the club. In his first season in Indiana, Richison registered 16 points in 48 games as the Komets qualified for the playoffs, losing in the opening round to the Kalamazoo Wings. The following season was a successful one; the stay-at-home defenceman had a career best season, with 23 points in 52 games, and the Komets had an unprecedent 12–0 record in the playoffs, culminating in them winning the Turner Cup, beating the San Diego Gulls in the finals. The 1993–94 season was also a successful one, Richison tallied 20 points in 59 games, and the Komets again made it to the Turner Cup finals, before ultimately losing to the Atlanta Knights.

Richson would return for his fourth season in Fort Wayne for the 1994–95 season, and would register 19 points in 72 games as the Komets would go out in the opening round of the playoffs, losing to the Peoria Rivermen. He would only play 3 times with the Komets during the 1995–96 season, after being involved in motorcycle crash. The accident resulted in a dislocated hip, broken pelvis and a severe concussion, among other injuries, with some doctors stating that he'd never skate again.

Despite the injuries he suffered, Richison returned to hockey for the 1996–97 season, again with the Komets. In his first season back, he scored 8 points in 51 games in the IHL, and also registered 3 points in 6 games with the Quad City Mallards whilst playing in the CoHL. The following season Richison again played for the Komets, as well 3 games with the Muskegon Fury of the UHL. Since returning from injury, the Komets had decided not to offer him a permanent contract, instead signing him to consecutive 25 game PTO contracts. Unhappy with this situation, Richison signed for the Orlando Solar Bears midway through the season. He played two games with the Solar Bears before breaking a bone in his hand; despite this setback, the team offered him a full-time contract and he finished the season in Orlando. The team made it to the playoff semi-finals, ultimately losing them to the Detroit Vipers.

His stay in Florida will ultimately be a short one, as he signed with the Kansas City Blades, also of the IHL for the 1998–99 season, where he played 65 games and registered 8 points. He also had a short stint with the Muskegon Fury, playing 2 games and scoring a goal. He returned to Kansas for the following season, and had his best season since his accident, posting 17 points in 58 games. For the 2000–01 season, Richison began with the Houston Aeros, before moving to Europe in order the play for the London Knights of the BISL, where he played with former Blades teammates Brendan Yarema and Pat Ferschweiler. Whilst performing well in the league, the Knights would also find continental success, beating both the Munich Barons and HC Slovan Bratislava in the IIHF Continental Cup. Although Swiss side ZSC Lions would ultimately win the Cup, the Knights would take the silver medal and their performance in the competition was considered to be the best by a British team at the time. Richison registered 8 points in 32 games in the capital, and the Knights made it to the playoff final, narrowly losing to the Sheffield Steelers. Following his season overseas, Richison retired from professional hockey.

== Awards and achievements ==
- Turner Cup Champion (1993)

== Career statistics ==
			Regular season					Playoffs
Season	Team	League	GP	G	A	Pts	PIM	GP	G	A	Pts	PIM
1988–89	Calgary Dinosaurs	CWUAA	16	2	12	14	59	—	—	—	—	—
1989–90	Moncton Hawks	AHL	50	2	10	12	28	—	—	—	—	—
1990–91	Moncton Hawks	AHL	49	4	9	13	57	—	—	—	—	—
1991–92	Fort Wayne Komets	IHL	48	6	10	16	84	5	0	2	2	9
1992–93	Muskegon Fury	CoHL	2	0	1	1	0	—	—	—	—	—
1992–93	Fort Wayne Komets	IHL	52	5	18	23	73	12	1	7	8	20
1993–94	Fort Wayne Komets	IHL	59	3	17	20	50	17	0	3	3	28
1994–95	Fort Wayne Komets	IHL	72	3	16	19	62	4	0	3	3	2
1995–96	Fort Wayne Komets	IHL	3	0	1	1	6	—	—	—	—	—
1996–97	Quad City Mallards	CoHL	6	0	3	3	2	—	—	—	—	—
1996–97	Fort Wayne Komets	IHL	51	1	7	8	57	—	—	—	—	—
1997–98	Muskegon Fury	UHL	3	0	1	1	0	—	—	—	—	—
1997–98	Fort Wayne Komets	IHL	23	0	1	1	20	—	—	—	—	—
1997–98	Orlando Solar Bears	IHL	24	1	4	5	31	17	2	3	5	16
1998–99	Muskegon Fury	UHL	2	1	0	1	2	—	—	—	—	—
1998–99	Kansas City Blades	IHL	65	0	8	8	58	3	0	0	0	4
1999–00	Kansas City Blades	IHL	58	4	13	17	89	—	—	—	—	—
2000–01	Houston Aeros	IHL	8	0	0	0	8	—	—	—	—	—
2000–01	London Knights	BISL	32	2	6	8	49	8	0	0	0	6
IHL totals			463	23	95	118	538	58	3	18	21	79
