= Mark Kolesar =

Canadian ice hockey player

- Born: January 23, 1973 (age 53) Neepawa, Manitoba, Canada
- Height: 6 ft 1 in (185 cm)
- Weight: 188 lb (85 kg; 13 st 6 lb)
- Position: Centre
- Shot: Right
- Played for: Toronto Maple Leafs; Nottingham Panthers; SERC Wild Wings; London Knights; Alleghe HC
- NHL draft: Undrafted
- Playing career: 1994–2004

Mark Timothy Kolesar (born January 23, 1973) is a Canadian former professional ice hockey centre who played two seasons in the National Hockey League for the Toronto Maple Leafs between 1995 and 1997. The rest of his career, which lasted from 1994 to 2004, was split between the minor leagues and various leagues in Europe.

== Playing career ==
Kolesar began his major junior career with the Brandon Wheat Kings of the WHL in 1991, having previously played for the Neepawa Natives of the MJHL. He had a quiet season during his rookie year, registering 13 points in 53 games. His scoring improved in his second year, however, tallying 60 points in 68 games. By his third year, he was scoring at a point-per-game rate, with 66 points in 59 games. This offensive production got the attention of the Toronto Maple Leafs who signed him to a contract on 24 May 1994.

Upon turning professional, Kolesar spent the 1994-95 season with Toronto's AHL affiliate, the St. John's Maple Leafs registering 35 points in 60 games. The following season, Kolesar split time between St. John's and Toronto, playing 21 regular season games in the NHL, scoring his first NHL goal against the Detroit Red Wings in March 1996. The 1996-97 season was again split between Toronto and St. John's, with Kolesar playing 7 games in Ontario and 62 in Newfoundland. The following season, Kolesar would begin in St. John's before being loaned out to the IHL's Manitoba Moose. Kolesar was subsequently traded to the Hamilton Bulldogs, where he finished the season.

Europe would be Kolesar's next port of call, playing in the UK for BISL side Nottingham Panthers for the 1998-99 season. His time in Nottingham was successful, registering 42 points in 40 games. The team also found success, winning the Benson & Hedges Cup and reaching the finals of both the Challenge Cup and the BISL Play-off finals. Following a strong season in the UK, Kolesar moved to Germany to play for the SERC Wild Wings of the DEL. He managed 18 points in 55 games, as the Wild Wings struggled for much of the season, finishing 11th.

For the 2000-01 season, Kolesar returned to the UK, signing for reigning BISL Champions London Knights, where he was named as an alternate captain. At the Knights he played alongside former Wheat Kings team mates Jeff Hoad, Mark Dutiaume and Trevor Robins. His first season in the capital was successful, registering 27 points in 47 games, helping the Knights finish 4th in the league, before narrowly losing the Play-off final to the Sheffield Steelers. The Knights would also have continental success, beating both the Munich Barons and HC Slovan Bratislava in the IIHF Continental Cup. Although the Swiss side ZSC Lions would ultimately win the Cup, the Knights would take the silver medal, and their performance in the competition was considered to be the best by a British team at the time.

Kolesar remained in London for the following season, where he registered 25 points in 48 games. The Knights would struggle under new coach Bob Leslie, finishing 6th in the regular season, however, they nevertheless made it to the Play-off semi-finals, again narrowly losing to the Steelers. A third season in the capital followed, with Kolesar tallying 22 points in 29 games; the team finished 5th and lost the Play-off final to the Belfast Giants. Following the culmination of the 2002-03 season, the team would fold as a result of their rink, the London Arena, being sold to developers. This, coupled with the Ayr Scottish Eagles and Manchester Storm also folding, and the Bracknell Bees deciding to drop down to the BNL, culminating in the demise of the BISL.

For the 2003-04 season, Kolesar initially signed with the Italian side Alleghe HC, however, he only played one game before moving back to North America to play for the Wichita Thunder of the CHL. Whilst he had a productive season, 59 points in 64 games, towards the end of the season Kolesar broke his leg. Subsequently, Kolesar retired from professional hockey.

He briefly came out of retirement in 2009 to play senior hockey for the Steinbach North Stars to challenge for the Allan Cup. In doing so, he once again reunited with Dutiaume and Hoad. The team had a successful exhibition season, however, they lost in the Cup semi-finals to the South East Prairie Thunder.

== Post-playing career ==
Following his retirement from professional hockey, Kolesar served as an assistant coach for the Brandon AAA Midget Wheat Kings.

== Career statistics ==
=== Regular season and playoffs ===
			Regular season					Playoffs
Season	Team	League	GP	G	A	Pts	PIM	GP	G	A	Pts	PIM
1991–92	Brandon Wheat Kings	WHL	56	6	7	13	36	—	—	—	—	—
1992–93	Brandon Wheat Kings	WHL	68	27	33	60	110	4	0	0	0	4
1993–94	Brandon Wheat Kings	WHL	59	29	37	66	131	14	8	3	11	48
1994–95	St. John's Maple Leafs	AHL	65	12	18	30	62	5	1	0	1	2
1995–96	Toronto Maple Leafs	NHL	21	2	2	4	14	3	1	0	1	2
1995–96	St. John's Maple Leafs	AHL	52	22	13	35	47	—	—	—	—	—
1996–97	Toronto Maple Leafs	NHL	7	0	0	0	0	—	—	—	—	—
1996–97	St. John's Maple Leafs	AHL	62	22	28	50	64	10	1	3	4	6
1997–98	St. John's Maple Leafs	AHL	2	0	0	0	2	—	—	—	—	—
1997–98	Hamilton Bulldogs	AHL	27	2	12	14	47	6	1	1	2	0
1997–98	Manitoba Moose	IHL	30	1	9	10	29	—	—	—	—	—
1998–99	Nottingham Panthers	BISL	40	15	27	42	54	7	3	6	9	0
1999–00	SERC Wild Wings	DEL	67	11	14	25	78	—	—	—	—	—
2000–01	London Knights	BISL	47	8	19	27	30	8	4	1	5	10
2001–02	London Knights	BISL	48	5	20	25	48	7	3	3	6	18
2002–03	London Knights	BISL	29	10	12	22	10	18	7	13	20	16
2003–04	Alleghe HC	ITA	1	0	1	1	0	—	—	—	—	—
2003–04	Wichita Thunder	CHL	64	17	42	59	51	6	1	2	3	8
2009–09	Steinbach North Stars	Al-Cup	16	14	12	26	–	2	0	1	1	0
AHL totals			208	58	71	129	222	21	3	4	7	8
NHL totals			28	2	2	4	14	3	1	0	1	2

== Awards and achievements ==
- Benson & Hedges Cup winner (1999).
- London Knights All-time points leader (74)
