= Aaron Boh =

Canadian ice hockey player (born 1974)

- Born: July 4, 1974 (age 52) Lethbridge, Alberta, Canada
- Height: 6 ft 0 in (183 cm)
- Weight: 185 lb (84 kg; 13 st 3 lb)
- Position: Defenceman
- Shot: Left
- Played for: Columbus Chill; Atlanta Knights; Louisiana IceGators; Minnesota Moose; Rochester Americans; Houston Aeros; Fayetteville Force; Fort Wayne Komets; Toledo Storm; Cardiff Devils; Arkansas RiverBlades; Peoria Rivermen; Jokerit; San Antonio Iguanas; London Knights; Colorado Gold Kings; Saint-Jean Mission; Sorel Royaux; Québec RadioX; Saint-Hyacinthe Cristal; Saint-Georges-de-Beauce CRS Express
- NHL draft: 261st overall, 1992; Vancouver Canucks
- Playing career: 1994–2006

Aaron Boh (born April 4, 1974) is a Canadian former professional ice hockey defenceman, who played in the minor leagues and in Europe.

== Playing career ==
Boh began his major junior career with the Brandon Wheat Kings of the WHL in 1991, however, he was dealt to the Spokane Chiefs after only 4 games. In the off-season he was selected 261st overall by the Vancouver Canucks in the 1992 NHL entry draft. The following season Boh began with the Chiefs but was subsequently traded to the Medicine Hat Tigers. The 1993–94 season saw Boh start with the Tigers, before being traded again, this time to the Tri-City Americans in exchange for Marc Hussey. Following the culmination of the Americans season Boh turned professional, signing with the Columbus Chill of the ECHL who served as the Canucks secondary affiliate team.

Boh remained with the Chill for the 1994–95 season, registering 30 points in 58 games, whilst also playing 20 games for the IHL's Atlanta Knights. The following season, he began with the Chill, before being acquired by the Louisiana IceGators also of the ECHL, with whom he finished the season. Over the course of the ECHL season he scored 61 points in 54 games and was named as a Second Team All-Star. In addition he also played the IHL's Minnesota Moose and the Rochester Americans of the AHL. The following year with the IceGators, he had a career year scoring 65 points in 52 games, helping the team make it to the Kelly Cup final, ultimately losing to the South Carolina Stingrays. Boh also played 3 games with the Houston Aeros of the IHL.

The 1997–98 season saw Boh sign with the CHL's Fayetteville Force where he tallied 58 points in 56 games. He also played 6 games for the IHL's Fort Wayne Komets. Boh returned to the ECHL the following year, playing for the Toledo Storm scoring 39 points in 65 games. Boh began the 1999–00 season with the Storm, however, after 10 games with the team he was traded to the Arkansas RiverBlades in exchange for Jarret Whidden. After 20 games with the RiverBlades Boh moved to the Europe in order to play for the Cardiff Devils of the BISL. He only played 12 games in Wales however, before being released for disciplinary reasons. He subsequently returned to the ECHL and played for the Peoria Rivermen. The Rivermen had an extended playoff run, culminating in them lifting the Kelly Cup.

He began the 2000–01 season with the CHL's San Antonio Iguanas before moving to Finland in order to play for SM-liiga side Jokerit. Boh played 7 games for the Helsinki-based outfit before returning the U.K. in order to play for the London Knights. The Knights were down a defenceman after Lee Sorochan left the club; coincidentally for Jokerit. Boh finished the season with the Knights, who made it to the play-off finals before narrowly losing to the Sheffield Steelers. The 2001–02 season saw Boh sign with the Colorado Gold Kings of the WCHL for whom he scored 47 points in 69 games.

The off-season would see Boh initially sign with the El Paso Buzzards of the CHL, however he never dressed for the team and instead signed with the Saint-Jean Mission of the QSPHL. Boh registered 34 points in 35 games as the Mission made it to the semi-finals before losing to the Chiefs de Laval. He began the following season with the Mission, before being traded to the Sorel Royaux. The league rebranded during the off-season as the Ligue Nord-Américaine de Hockey, and Boh moved to Québec RadioX where he tallied 36 points in 49 games and the team would lift the Futura Cup as league champions. The 2005–06 season would see Boh play for three teams in the LNAH, the Saint-Georges-de-Beauce CRS Express and the Sorel-Tracy Mission, before being traded to the Saint-Hyacinthe Cristal. At the culmination of the season, Boh retired from professional hockey.

== Awards and achievements ==
- ECHL Second Team All-Star (1996)
- ECHL Kelly Cup Champion (2000)
- LNAH Futura Cup Champion (2005)

== Career statistics ==
			Regular season					Playoffs
Season	Team	League	GP	G	A	Pts	PIM	GP	G	A	Pts	PIM
1991–92	Brandon Wheat Kings	WHL	4	0	0	0	4	—	—	—	—	—
1991-92	Spokane Chiefs	WHL	55	3	19	22	209	8	0	2	2	17
1992–93	Spokane Chiefs	WHL	15	3	10	13	62	—	—	—	—	—
1992–93	Medicine Hat Tigers	WHL	58	6	21	27	173	10	0	4	4	27
1993–94	Medicine Hat Tigers	WHL	28	4	15	19	99	—	—	—	—	—
1993–94	Tri-City Americans	WHL	27	3	7	10	97	—	—	—	—	—
1993–94	Columbus Chill	ECHL	10	1	9	10	31	6	2	1	3	17
1994-95	Columbus Chill	ECHL	58	5	25	30	186	—	—	—	—	—
1994-95	Atlanta Knights	IHL	20	2	6	8	15	—	—	—	—	—
1995-96	Columbus Chill	ECHL	37	17	31	48	136	—	—	—	—	—
1995-96	Minnesota Moose	IHL	3	0	0	0	2	—	—	—	—	—
1995-96	Rochester Americans	AHL	12	0	4	4	10	—	—	—	—	—
1995-96	Louisiana IceGators	ECHL	17	5	8	13	58	5	1	7	8	10
1996-97	Louisiana IceGators	ECHL	52	11	54	65	193	17	4	17	21	93
1996-97	Houston Aeros	IHL	3	0	0	0	2	—	—	—	—	—
1997–98	Fayetteville Force	CHL	56	15	43	58	230	—	—	—	—	—
1997-98	Fort Wayne Komets	IHL	6	0	1	1	8	—	—	—	—	—
1998–99	Toledo Storm	ECHL	65	11	28	39	226	7	3	6	9	28
1999–00	Toledo Storm	ECHL	10	0	8	8	94	—	—	—	—	—
1999-00	Arkansas RiverBlades	ECHL	20	3	12	15	90	—	—	—	—	—
1999–00	Cardiff Devils	BISL	5	0	0	0	12	—	—	—	—	—
1999-00	Peoria Rivermen	ECHL	15	5	12	17	49	15	2	9	11	57
2000–01	San Antonio Iguanas	CHL	12	3	4	7	61	—	—	—	—	—
2000-01	Jokerit	SM-liiga	7	0	0	0	22	—	—	—	—	—
2000–01	London Knights	BISL	22	1	3	4	20	8	1	1	2	10
2001-02	Colorado Gold Kings	WCHL	69	16	31	47	343	5	0	2	2	24
2002–03	Saint-Jean Mission	QSPHL	35	12	22	34	163	14	4	8	12	68
2003–04	Saint-Jean Mission	QSPHL	17	3	6	9	94	—	—	—	—	—
2003–04	Sorel Royaux	QSPHL	27	2	7	9	106	6	0	1	1	30
2004–05	Québec RadioX	LNAH	49	9	27	36	110	11	1	5	6	30
2005–06	Saint-Georges-de-Beauce CRS Express	LNAH	13	0	2	2	33	—	—	—	—	—
2005–06	Sorel-Tracy Mission	LNAH	19	3	6	9	63	—	—	—	—	—
2005–06	Saint-Hyacinthe Cristal	LNAH	17	3	4	7	12	—	—	—	—	—
SM-liiga totals			7	0	0	0	22	—	—	—	—	—
ECHL totals			284	58	187	245	1063	50	12	40	52	205
