= Randy Perry =

Canadian retired ice hockey defenceman

- Born: June 19, 1976 (age 49) Edmonton, Alberta, Canada
- Height: 6 ft 1 in (185 cm)
- Weight: 203 lb (92 kg; 14 st 7 lb)
- Position: Defence
- Shot: Right
- Played for: SERC Wild Wings; London Knights; Houston Aeros; Louisiana IceGators; Philadelphia Phantoms; Herning Blue Fox; Manchester Monarchs; Bridgeport Sound Tigers; Bakersfield Condors; Greensboro Generals; Utah Grizzlies; Wheeling Nailers; Stony Plain Eagles
- National team: Canada
- NHL draft: Undrafted
- Playing career: 1998–2007

Randall W. Perry (born June 19, 1976 in Edmonton, Alberta) is a Canadian retired ice hockey defenceman.

== Career ==
Beginning in 1992, Perry played junior hockey for the WHL's Lethbridge Hurricanes. After two relatively quiet years, he had a breakout year during the 1993–94 season, registering 56 points in 69 games. Perry remained with the team the following season, as the Hurricanes made the playoffs. Perry began the 1996–97 season with the Hurricanes as an over-age player, however, after 6 games with the team he was traded to the Seattle Thunderbirds, where he had a successful year, tallying 46 points in 60 games, and being named as a First Team WHL All-Star. The Thunderbirds went on to have an extended play-off run, before being swept by the Hurricanes in the WHL Championship Final.

Following his final junior season, Perry signed a professional contract with the Canadian National Team, who, at the time, played exhibition games across North America. Following his stint with the National Team, Perry moved to Germany in order to sign with the SERC Wild Wings of the DEL. His first year in Schwenningen was moderately productive, registering 13 points in 52 games, as the Wild Wings finished 10th overall. The Wild Wings finished 11th the following the season, with Perry's scoring output dipping to only 5 points in 56 games. At the culmination of the 1999–2000 season, Perry and Wild Wings teammate Mark Kolesar moved to the UK in order to play for reigning BISL Champions, the London Knights. Perry had a solid year in London, registering 19 points in 48 games, helping the Knights to a 4th-place finish, before narrowly losing the play-off final to the Sheffield Steelers.

Louisiana was Perry's next port of call, playing for the Louisiana IceGators of the ECHL during the 2001–02 season. During his time in Lafayette, Perry registered 30 points in 60 games, and was called up by the IceGators AHL affiliate team, the Houston Aeros. In addition, Perry also played a handful of games with the Philadelphia Phantoms, also of the AHL. He returned to Europe for the 2002–03 season, playing for Danish side Herning Blue Fox of the SuperBest Ligaen; he scored 9 points in 28 games as the team finished 3rd in the regular season. Subsequently, Herning won the play-offs, beating the Odense Bulldogs 3–1 in the final.

Perry returned to North American for the 2003–04 season, playing for multiple teams; the AHL's Manchester Monarchs and Utah Grizzlies, as well as the ECHL's Bakersfield Condors and Greensboro Generals, before finishing the season with the AHL's Bridgeport Sound Tigers. The following season, Perry played exclusively for the Wheeling Nailers, registering 14 points in 69 games. Following the season in West Virginia, Perry retired from professional hockey, but he went on to play senior hockey for the Stony Plain Eagles of the Chinook Hockey League during the 2006–07 season.

== Awards and achievements ==
- WHL (West) First All-Star Team (1997)
- Danish Champion (2003)

== Career statistics ==
=== Regular season and playoffs ===
			Regular season					Playoffs
Season	Team	League	GP	G	A	Pts	PIM	GP	G	A	Pts	PIM
1992-93	Lethbridge Hurricanes	WHL	59	1	4	5	27	1	0	0	0	0
1993-94	Lethbridge Hurricanes	WHL	59	3	3	6	19	7	0	1	1	2
1994-95	Lethbridge Hurricanes	WHL	69	7	49	56	37	—	—	—	—	—
1995-96	Lethbridge Hurricanes	WHL	72	8	27	35	57	4	0	2	2	10
1996-97	Lethbridge Hurricanes	WHL	6	3	0	3	17	—	—	—	—	—
1996-97	Seattle Thunderbirds	WHL	60	9	37	46	39	15	5	9	14	8
1998–98	SERC Wild Wings	DEL	52	3	10	13	38	—	—	—	—	—
1999–00	SERC Wild Wings	DEL	56	4	1	5	36	12	3	3	6	0
2000–01	London Knights	BISL	48	11	8	19	32	8	2	3	5	2
2001–02	Houston Aeros	AHL	7	0	1	1	0	—	—	—	—	—
2001–02	Louisiana IceGators	ECHL	60	8	22	30	29	5	0	2	2	0
2001-02	Philadelphia Phantoms	AHL	3	0	1	1	0	—	—	—	—	—
2002–03	Herning Blue Fox	DEN	28	3	6	9	56	13	1	4	5	33
2003–04	Manchester Monarchs	AHL	24	1	5	6	12	—	—	—	—	—
2003-04	Bridgeport Sound Tigers	AHL	1	0	1	1	2	3	0	1	1	0
2003–04	Bakersfield Condors	ECHL	22	1	6	7	27	—	—	—	—	—
2003-04	Greensboro Generals	ECHL	13	2	3	5	5	—	—	—	—	—
2003-04	Utah Grizzlies	AHL	2	0	0	0	0	—	—	—	—	—
2004–05	Wheeling Nailers	ECHL	69	2	12	14	58	—	—	—	—	—
2006-07	Stony Plain Eagles	ChHL	9	4	10	14	8	—	—	—	—	—
	ECHL totals		164	13	43	56	119	5	0	2	2	0

=== International ===
			Regular season					Playoffs
Season	Team	Event	GP	G	A	Pts	PIM	GP	G	A	Pts	PIM
1997-98	Canada	INT	62	10	10	20	84	—	—	—	—	—
	Totals		62	10	10	20	84	—	—	—	—	—
