= Mikko Koivunoro =

Finnish ice hockey player

- Born: November 12, 1971 Joensuu, Finland
- Height: 5 ft 10 in (178 cm)
- Weight: 179 lb (81 kg; 12 st 11 lb)
- Position: C
- Shot: Left
- Played for: Karhu-Kissat; JoKP; Kiekko-Espoo; Krefeld Pinguine; Podhale Nowy Targ; Newcastle Riverkings; London Knights; Edinburgh Capitals; Guildford Flames; Newcastle Vipers; Nottingham Panthers
- NHL draft: Undrafted
- Playing career: 1990–2004

Mikko Koivunoro (November 12, 1971) is a Finnish retired professional ice hockey centre who played in Finland and throughout Europe.

== Career ==
Koivunoro began his professional career with Helsinki-based club Karhu-Kissat of the I-Divisioona in 1990. In 1992 he moved to his hometown club JoKP also of the I-Divisioona, helping the team win the league. Following two seasons in Joensuu, Koivunoro made his SM-liiga debut for Kiekko-Espoo in 1994.

Koivunoro's rookie season in the top flight was moderately productive, tallying 17 points in 41 games, helping the team finish 7th in the league, before losing to Lukko in play-off quarterfinals. Koivunoro remained in Uusimaa for the following season, again registering 17 points, this time in 35 games. In addition to his time in Espoo Koivunoro also had brief spells on loan to both Haukat of the I-Divisioona, as well as 2. Divisioona side EPS. The 1996–97 season saw Koivunoro remain in Espoo, during which time he put up his best SM-liiga season, scoring 24 points in 46 games. Koivunoro began the following season again with Espoo, however, after only 6 games with the side he moved to Germany to play for DEL side Krefeld Pinguine for whom he registered a 29 points in 32 games.

The following season, Koivunoro moved to Poland to play for Ekstraklasa side Podhale Nowy Targ helping the team finish 3rd overall. For the 1999–2000 season, Koivunoro, alongside Podhale teammate Kim Ahlroos, would move to the United Kingdom in order to play for BISL outfit Newcastle Riverkings. The Riverkings had been purchased by SM-liiga side Jokerit in the off-season, and installed Jukka Jalonen as head coach. As a result of the Finnish connection, Koivunoro would be one of twelve Finns to dress for the Riverkings over the course of the season. His season with the Riverkings was a mixed bag; the team finished last in standings during the regular season, however nevertheless made it to the Play-off Final, which they lost 7–3 to the London Knights. Despite the team's regular season struggles, it was a productive season for Koivunoro as he led the team in scoring with 52 points in 40 games. Koivunoro would also set the then league record for assists in a single season, with 39. As a result of his fine form, at the end of the season he was named to the BISL Second All-Star team.

For the 2000–01 season, Koivunoro and Riverkings teammate Mikael Tjallden both moved to the reigning champion London Knights, helping the team to a 4th-place finish in the regular season, before narrowly losing the Play-Off Final to the Sheffield Steelers. Following the completion of the season, Koivunoro swapped the English capital for its Scottish counterpart, signing for the Edinburgh Capitals of the British National League, in the second tier of British hockey. His stay in Scotland was short however, as after 12 games he moved to the Guildford Flames, also of the BNL. Despite playing fewer games than most of his teammates, he would lead the team in scoring, with a career high 61 points in only 29 games.

The 2002–03 season saw Koivunoro stay in the BNL, but return to Tyneside in order to play for the newly formed Newcastle Vipers. Although the Vipers struggled throughout the course of the season, they did manage to win the Findus Challenge Cup. Despite the team's struggles, Koivunoro was the team's top scorer, with 53 points in 34 games, and was considered a fan favourite.

Koivunoro would then move to the Nottingham Panthers of the EIHL, the new top-tier of hockey in the UK following the collapse of the BISL. At the Panthers, Koivunoro would again link up with Ahlroos, and would have another productive season, registering 52 points in 47 games. The Panthers would win the Challenge Cup, beating the Sheffield Steelers in overtime, with Koivunoro getting an assist on Ahlroos's winning goal. They would also face off against the Steelers in the Play-off final, with the Sheffield side emerging victorious. Following his season in Nottingham, Koivunoro retired.

== Post-playing career ==
Following the culmination of his playing career, Koivunoro started working as a real estate entrepreneur for RE/MAX. In addition, he served as the assistant coach for the Joensuu-based 2. Divisioona side Kopla between 2018 and 2020.

== Awards and achievements ==
- I-Divisioona Champion (1992–93).
- BISL Second Team All-Star (1999–2000).
- Findus Challenge Cup (2002–03).
- EIHL Challenge Cup (2003–04).

== Career statistics ==
=== Regular season and playoffs ===
			Regular season					Playoffs
Season	Team	League	GP	G	A	Pts	PIM	GP	G	A	Pts	PIM
1990–91	Karhu-Kissat	I-Divisioona	35	5	15	20	16	—	—	—	—	—
1992–93	JoKP	I-Divisioona	44	13	22	35	48	6	1	1	2	4
1992–93	SaPKo (loan)	2. Divisioona	1	0	0	0	0	—	—	—	—	—
1993–94	JoKP	I-Divisioona	43	10	34	44	36	6	2	5	7	2
1994–95	Kiekko-Espoo	SM-liiga	45	5	12	17	26	4	0	1	1	6
1995-96	Kiekko-Espoo	SM-liiga	35	5	12	17	26	—	—	—	—	—
1995–96	Haukat (loan)	I-divisioona	4	0	3	3	6	—	—	—	—	—
1995–96	EPS (loan)	2. Divisioona	1	0	3	3	12	—	—	—	—	—
1996-97	Kiekko-Espoo	SM-liiga	46	6	18	24	132	4	0	1	1	2
1997-98	Kiekko-Espoo	SM-liiga	6	0	1	1	0	—	—	—	—	—
1997–98	EPS (loan)	2. Divisioona	2	2	1	3	6	—	—	—	—	—
1997–98	Krefeld Pinguine	DEL	32	5	24	29	20	10	1	3	4	10
1998–99	Podhale Nowy Targ	POL	?	18	38	56	163	?	4	10	14	52
1999-00	Newcastle Riverkings	BISL	40	13	39	52	46	7	1	5	6	4
2000–01	London Knights	BISL	47	9	21	30	36	8	2	6	8	35
2001-02	Edinburgh Capitals	BNL	12	1	16	17	6	—	—	—	—	—
2001–02	Guildford Flames	BNL	29	17	44	61	36	8	0	5	5	20
2002-03	Newcastle Vipers	BNL	34	20	33	53	32	6	4	0	4	16
2003-04	Nottingham Panthers	EIHL	47	12	40	52	101	6	1	2	3	16
	Liiga totals		132	16	43	59	184	8	0	2	2	8
