= Darby Walker =

Canadian ice hockey player

- Born: August 5, 1974 (age 51) Beaverlodge, Alberta, Canada
- Height: 6 ft 4 in (193 cm)
- Weight: 225 lb (102 kg; 16 st 1 lb)
- Position: Forward
- Shot: Left
- Played for: CHL; Fayetteville Force; San Antonio Iguanas; BISL; Newcastle Riverkings; London Knights
- NHL draft: Undrafted
- Playing career: 1997–2002

Darby Walker (born August 5, 1974) is a Canadian former professional ice hockey player.

Walker played three seasons (1991-1994) of major junior hockey in the Western Hockey League (WHL).

Walker went on to play professional hockey, starting with 12 games played in the Central Hockey League (CHL) with the Fayetteville Force during the 1997–98. He then played three seasons in the British Ice Hockey Superleague (BISL) with the Newcastle Riverkings and the London Knights, where he scored 7 goals and 11 assist1 for 18 points, while earning 151 penalty minutes, in 79 BISL games played. Walker concluded his career with the 2001–02 San Antonio Iguanas of the CHL.
