= London Knights (UK) =

Former Ice hockey team in London, England

- City: London, United Kingdom
- League: Ice Hockey Superleague; 1998 - 2003
- Founded: 1998
- Folded: 2003
- Home arena: London Arena (capacity: 12,500)
- Colours: Red, navy blue, gold, white
- Owner: Anschutz Entertainment Group
- Head coach: (Sweden) Jim Brithén
- Captain: (Canada) Paul Rushforth

Championships
- Playoff championships: 2000

London Knights was an English ice hockey team based in London. They played in the UK's Ice Hockey Superleague between September 1998 and April 2003.

== History ==
The Knights were founded in 1998 by Anschutz Entertainment Group in the hope of being able to partake in the British ice hockey boom of the 1990s, when teams like Manchester Storm and Sheffield Steelers drew in large crowds of up to 8,000 on average and up to 17,000 in single games. Anschutz hoped that a London-based team would help raise the awareness of the sport not only in London, but in the whole of the UK. Furthermore, the team was founded in order to help make the financially struggling London Arena (which was co-owned by Anschutz and SMG) more profitable.

The team shared its name with the Ontario Hockey League team, the London Knights, but they had nothing to do with each other as the origin of the name came from the then policy of Anschutz Entertainment Group to brand its ice hockey franchises with a regal theme associated with its flagship Los Angeles Kings NHL franchise, hence the Ontario Reign, Reading Royals and the Manchester Monarchs and Munich Barons, both of whom are now defunct as well.

The Knights enjoyed some success in their brief existence. They won the British Super League playoffs in 2000, thus becoming Sekonda Supperleague Playoff Champions, but their biggest success was reaching the final of the Continental Cup in 2001, becoming the first British team to do so and being the most successful British team in the history of the tournament until it was won by the Nottingham Panthers in 2017. They beat HC Slovan Bratislava 5:2 and the Munich Barons 4:1, but lost to the ZSC Lions 0:1.

They were coached by Jim Fuyarchuk, Chris McSorley, Bob Leslie and Jim Brithén. McSorley would later go on to coach Great Britain and work as assistant coach to Team Canada. His brother Marty McSorley, then of the Boston Bruins, was almost signed by the Knights while serving a 100-game ban in the NHL.

Despite their on-ice success, their attendance figures were always rather disappointing as they never drew much more than 3000 people on average - which certainly wasn't bad considering that before the Knights, there hadn't been a professional ice hockey team in London for decades, but on the other hand, there was certainly much more potential, considering the size of the town, the attendance figures of the other teams in the league and the fact that the arena could hold up to 12,500 people and Anschutz invested much in marketing.

In 2003, the team's arena, the London Arena, was sold, and the team were left homeless. There were hopes they would find a temporary home for two years before moving to the O2 Arena in 2005, but when the Superleague folded after the 2002–03 season, the team announced that it would "not be icing" in the following season, and never returned.

After the demise of the Superleague, the Elite Ice Hockey League was founded as its replacement, and the London Racers were established as a successor to the Knights, but they were much more low-profile and played at a much smaller venue, and after only two and a half seasons, they folded in late 2005 due to safety problems at their home venue. Since then, there hasn't been a London-based ice hockey team in the top-tier league again.

== Season history ==
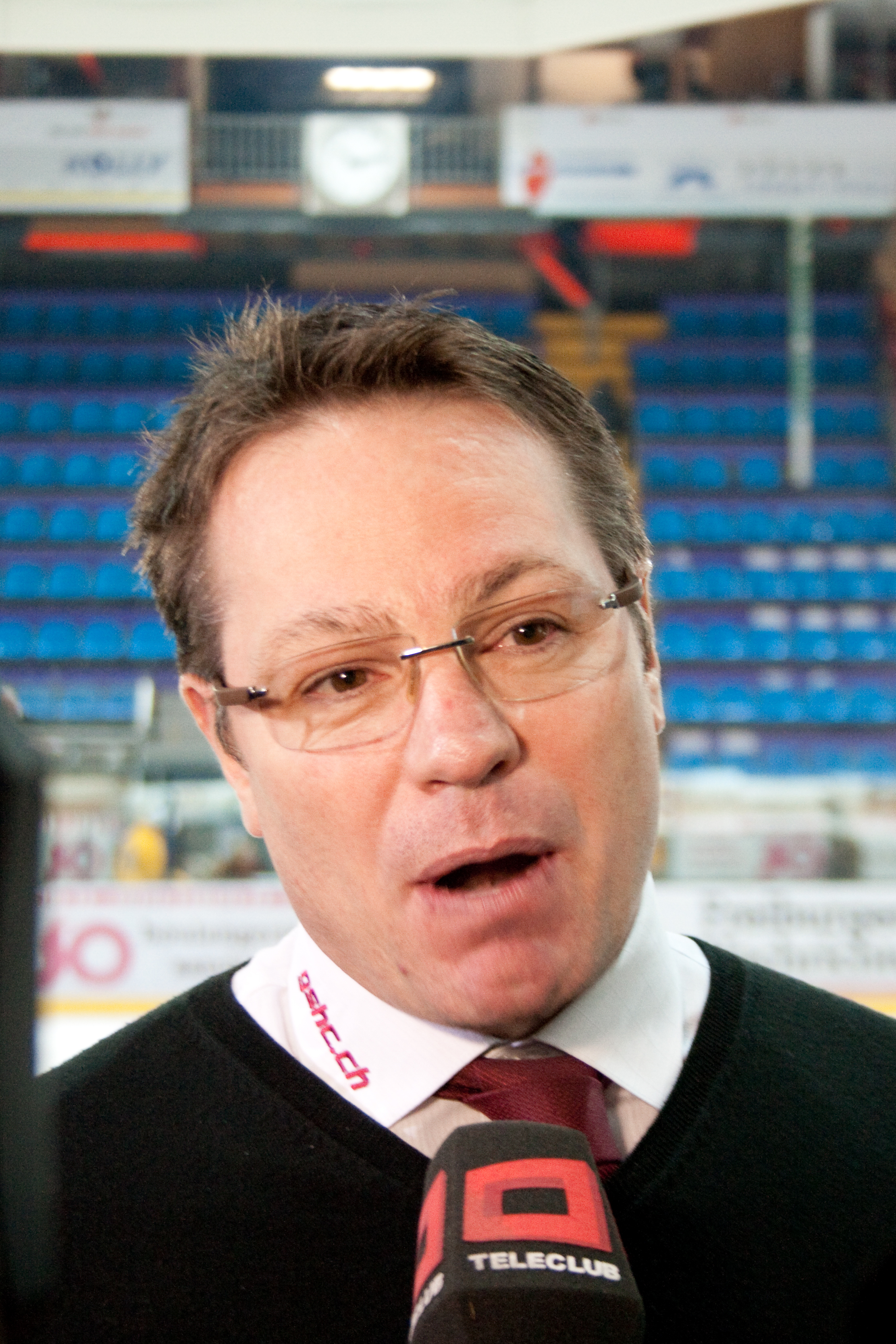
Chris McSorley, the Knights' head coach from 1999 to 2001.

=== Superleague ===
This table shows the Knights' standings and results in the British Ice Hockey Superleague.

The team finished bottom of the league in their first season, but followed that in the 1999-2000 season by winning the playoffs, beating the Newcastle Jesters 7–3 in the final.

SEASON	GP	W	T	L	OTW	OTL	GF	GA	TP	RANK	POSTSEASON
1998 - 1999	42	10	3	25	-	4	114	183	27	8	Qualification
1999 - 2000	42	23	3	15	-	1	135	125	50	4	Champion
2000 - 2001	48	18	-	17	7	6	143	130	74	4	Finalist
2001 - 2002	48	14	13	21	-	-	130	145	41	6	Semifinalist
2002 - 2003	32	11	8	12	-	1	87	90	31	4	Finalist

=== Continental Cup ===
The Knights became the first British team to reach the finals of the Continental Cup in January 2001, where they narrowly missed taking the title at their first attempt. Their run included a surprise 4-1 win over Anschutz stablemates the Munich Barons, and only a 1-0 loss to eventual champions Zurich Lions denied them further glory. Their silver medal was considered a major success for a British side.

Season	Round	GP	W	T	L	OTW	OTL	GF	GA	TP	RANK
2000 - 2001	Second Group Stage	3	2	1	0	-	-	15	2	5	1
	Final Group Stage	3	2	0	1	-	-	9	4	4	2
2001 - 2002	Second Group Stage	3	1	1	1	-	-	11	12	3	3

=== Bensons and Hedges Cup ===
The Knights performed well in the Bensons and Hedges Cup, making two semifinals and one final in three seasons.

Season	Round
1998 - 1999	Semifinal
1999 - 2000	Final
2000 - 2001	Semifinal

=== Challenge Cup ===
The Knights also took part in the Challenge Cup, making three semifinals in five seasons.

Season	Round
1998 - 1999	First round
1999 - 2000	Semifinal
2000 - 2001	Semifinal
2001 - 2002	First round
2002 - 2003	Semifinal

== All-time roster ==
The majority of Knights players were Canadian-born; only a handful were British natives. Rich Bronilla is the most-capped Knights player with 125 appearances, and fellow Canadian Ian McIntyre was London's top scorer, with 25 goals. The following is a list of players who played for the Knights.

Player name	GP	G	A	Pts	PIM	Seasons	Yrs.	Pos.	Birthdate	Birthplace	Highest Level
Gerad Adams	49	4	8	12	176	2001-2003	2	D	1978-04-03	Regina, Canada	Minor Pro
Kim Ahlroos	75	20	34	54	32	2001-2003	2	F	1971-07-02	Helsinki, Finland	European Elite
Domenic Amodeo	8	1	5	6	2	2001-2002	1	C	1968-03-06	Mississauga, Canada	Minor Pro
Steve Aronson	24	4	9	13	10	2002-2003	1	R	1978-07-15	Minnetonka, United States	Minor Pro
Tom Ashe	37	5	11	16	48	1999-2000	1	D	1974-06-07	Springfield, United States	Minor Pro
Peter Åslin	6	0	0	0	0	1998-1999	1	G	1962-09-21	Norrtälje, Sweden	European Elite
Scott Bailey	1	0	0	0	2	2001-2002	1	G	1972-05-02	Calgary, Canada	Major League
Darren Banks	23	8	2	10	101	1999-2000	1	L	1966-03-18	Toronto, Canada	Major League
Mike Barrie	48	20	24	44	140	2001-2002	1	C	1974-03-17	Kelowna, Canada	Minor Pro
Andy Bezeau	11	1	5	6	44	1999-2000	1	L	1970-03-30	Saint John, Canada	Minor Pro
Sean Blanchard	67	11	18	29	38	2001-2003	2	D	1978-03-29	Sudbury, Canada	Minor Pro
Aaron Boh	22	1	3	4	20	2000-2001	1	D	1974-04-04	Lethbridge, Canada	Minor Pro
Rick Brebant	19	9	14	23	32	1999-2000	1	C	1964-02-21	Chelmsford, Canada	Minor Pro
Rich Bronilla	125	22	40	62	76	2000-2003	3	D	1975-07-15	Mississauga, Canada	Minor Pro
Mark Bultje	39	7	20	27	66	1999-2000	1	C	1973-06-08	Etobicoke, Canada	Minor Pro
Greg Burke	79	9	16	25	137	1999-2003	3	D	1969-03-12	Boston, United States	Minor Pro
John Byce	29	11	18	29	6	1999-2000	1	R	1967-08-09	Madison, United States	Major League
Scott Campbell	10	0	2	2	18	1999-2000	1	D	1972-01-22	Glasgow, United Kingdom	Minor Pro
Jason Campeau	33	7	10	17	12	1998-1999	1	C	1974-10-23	Ottawa, Canada	Minor Pro
Debb Carpenter	34	7	6	13	20	1998-1999	1	R	1972-08-11	Edmonton, Canada	Minor Pro
Mark Cavallin	53	0	2	2	4	1998-2000	2	G	1971-10-20	Mississauga, Canada	Minor Pro
Nicky Chinn	16	1	2	3	105	2000-2001	1	F	1972-09-14	Cardiff, United Kingdom	European Lower Leagues
David Clarke	10	2	1	3	0	2001-2002	1	L	1981-08-05	Peterborough, United Kingdom	European Lower Leagues
Ian Cooper	54	7	15	22	77	1998-2000	2	R	1968-11-29	Durham, United Kingdom	European Lower Leagues
Dean Crossland	2	0	0	0	0	2001-2002	1	G	1974-05-21	Penticton, Canada	Minor Pro
Troy Crowder	16	2	3	5	71	1998-1999	1	R	1968-05-03	Sudbury, Canada	Major League
Brent Cullaton	4	1	1	2	2	1999-2000	1	W	1974-11-12	Petawawa, Canada	Minor Pro
Andrew Dale	26	4	11	15	20	1998-1999	1	C	1976-02-16	Greater Sudbury, Canada	Minor Pro
Dom DiGiorgio	1	0	0	0	0	2001-2002	1	G	1977-01-09	Niagara Falls, Canada	Minor Pro
Rob Donovan	41	1	13	14	96	2001-2002	1	D	1970-05-26	Boston, United States	Minor Pro
Shane Dungey	37	0	8	8	38	1998-1999	1	D	1973-09-21	Richmond Hill, Canada	Minor Pro
Ryan Duthie	21	6	15	21	16	1999-2000	1	C	1974-09-02	Red Deer, Canada	Minor Pro
Mark Dutiaume	10	1	0	1	6	2000-2001	1	L	1977-01-31	Winnipeg, Canada	Minor Pro
Bruce Eakin	11	3	12	15	22	1998-1999	1	C	1962-09-28	Winnipeg, Canada	Major League
Jussi Eloranta	11	2	1	3	4	2000-2001	1	F	1976-03-07	Turku, Finland	Minor Pro
Pat Ferschweiler	39	3	17	20	26	2000-2001	1	R	1970-02-20	Rochester, United States	Minor Pro
Eric Flinton	39	16	17	33	24	1998-1999	1	L	1972-02-02	Williams Lake, Canada	Minor Pro
Greg Gatto	28	6	5	11	56	1998-1999	1	R	1971-01-01	Lethbridge, Canada	Minor Pro
Kelly Glowa	20	8	9	17	4	1998-1999	1	C	1963-08-11	Fort Saint John, Canada	Minor Pro
Jamie Hanlon	1	0	0	0	0	2000-2001	1	F	1968-08-11	Montreal, Canada	Minor Pro
Mike Harding	37	9	12	21	49	1998-1999	1	R	1971-02-24	Edmonton, Canada	Minor Pro
Peter Hasselblad	18	4	5	9	12	1998-1999	1	D	1966-04-20	Långbro, Sweden	European Elite
Jeff Hoad	73	24	29	53	66	1999-2003	2	C	1973-01-26	Brandon, Canada	Minor Pro
Bill Huard	1	1	0	1	4	2000-2001	1	L	1967-06-24	Welland, Canada	Major League
Marc Hussey	39	6	13	19	58	1999-2000	1	D	1974-01-22	Chatham, Canada	Minor Pro
Shane Johnson	36	6	11	17	48	1998-1999	1	D	1974-01-01	Brandon, Canada	European Lower Leagues
Jeff Johnstone	7	2	2	4	2	1999-2000	1	R	1975-09-21	Niagara Falls, Canada	Minor Pro
Jonas Junkka	12	2	3	5	0	1998-1999	1	D	1975-05-04	Kiruna, Sweden	Minor Pro
Claude Jutras	41	15	14	29	260	2000-2001	1	R	1973-09-18	Hampstead, Canada	Minor Pro
A.J. Kelham	9	1	1	2	2	2002-2003	1	C	1974-03-30	Vancouver, Canada	Minor Pro
Mike Kelleher	24	1	3	4	8	1998-1999	1	D	1973-03-29	Brookline, United States	Minor Pro
Rob Kenny	39	17	23	40	63	1999-2000	1	R	1968-10-19	Bronx, United States	Minor Pro
Scott Kirton	40	7	14	21	42	1998-1999	1	R	1971-10-04	Penetanguishene, Canada	Minor Pro
Mikko Koivunoro	47	9	21	30	36	2000-2001	1	C	1971-11-12	Joensuu, Finland	European Elite
Mark Kolesar	124	23	51	74	88	2000-2003	3	C	1973-01-23	Neepawa, Canada	Major League
Martin Krainz	20	3	3	6	16	1998-1999	1	D	1967-05-25	Klagenfurt, Austria	European Lower Leagues
Nate Leslie	62	6	6	12	52	2001-2003	2	W	1977-09-28	Winnipeg, Canada	Minor Pro
Ake Lilljebjorn	9	0	0	0	0	2002-2003	1	G	1969-09-23	Ludvika, Sweden	European Elite
Corey Lyons	30	13	8	21	8	1998-1999	1	R	1970-06-13	Calgary, Canada	Minor Pro
Maurizio Mansi	77	19	28	47	48	2001-2003	2	F	1965-09-03	Montreal, Canada	Minor Pro
Terry Marchant	29	5	11	16	12	2000-2001	1	C	1976-02-24	Buffalo, United States	Minor Pro
Neal Martin	86	14	27	41	69	1999-2001	2	D	1975-09-08	Greater Sudbury, Canada	Minor Pro
Dennis Maxwell	30	9	7	16	110	2002-2003	1	L	1974-06-04	Dauphin, Canada	Minor Pro
Ian McIntyre	80	25	27	52	94	2001-2003	2	L	1974-02-12	Montreal, Canada	Minor Pro
Sonny Mignacca	9	0	1	1	4	1998-1999	1	G	1974-01-04	Winnipeg, Canada	Minor Pro
Jesper Morin	17	2	2	4	22	1998-1999	1	F	1975-05-27	Malmö, Sweden	Minor Pro
Dave Morissette	13	2	1	3	117	2000-2001	1	L	1971-12-24	Baie-Comeau, Canada	Major League
Tim Murray	40	1	10	11	26	1999-2000	1	D	1974-11-14	Calgary, Canada	Minor Pro
Jay Neal	48	16	15	31	24	2000-2001	1	R	1970-06-03	Oshawa, Canada	Minor Pro
Barry Nieckar	18	2	0	2	143	1999-2000	1	L	1967-12-16	Rama, Canada	Major League
Ed Patterson	4	1	2	3	2	2002-2003	1	R	1972-11-14	Calgary, Canada	Major League
Randy Perry	48	11	8	19	32	2000-2001	1	D	1976-06-19	Edmonton, Canada	Minor Pro
Nick Poole	42	7	16	23	22	1998-1999	1	C	1973-07-11	Calgary, Canada	Minor Pro
Brent Pope	5	1	3	4	6	2000-2001	1	D	1973-02-20	Hamilton, Canada	Minor Pro
Pasi Raitanen	1	0	0	0	0	1998-1999	1	G	1971-05-13	Forssa, Finland	European Elite
Bryan Richardson	45	17	30	47	42	2000-2001	1	C	1973-07-28	Montreal, Canada	Minor Pro
Grant Richison	32	2	6	8	49	2000-2001	1	D	1967-05-05	Detroit, United States	Minor Pro
Trevor Robins	70	0	2	2	4	1999-2002	3	G	1972-05-31	Brandon, Canada	Minor Pro
Trevor Roenick	30	13	9	22	20	2001-2002	1	R	1974-10-07	Derby, United States	Minor Pro
Paul Rushforth	120	21	44	65	401	1999-2003	4	C	1974-04-22	Prince George, Canada	Minor Pro
Vezio Sacratini	73	20	38	58	68	2001-2003	2	F	1966-09-12	Lasalle, Canada	European Lower Leagues
Claudio Scremin	40	7	26	33	18	1999-2000	1	D	1968-05-28	Burnaby, Canada	Major League
Doug Searle	23	1	2	3	15	2001-2002	1	D	1972-03-21	Toronto, Canada	Minor Pro
Shawn Silver	21	0	0	0	0	2000-2001	1	G	1975-09-06	Thunder Bay, Canada	Minor Pro
Chris Slater	32	1	6	7	135	2002-2003	1	D	1974-12-25	Mattawan, United States	Minor Pro
Greg Smyth	9	0	0	0	42	1999-2000	1	D	1966-04-23	Oakville, Canada	Major League
Lee Sorochan	8	1	3	4	48	2000-2001	1	D	1975-09-09	Edmonton, Canada	Major League
Regan Stocco	26	1	3	4	24	1998-1999	1	D	1975-08-16	Guelph, Canada	Minor Pro
Darren Stolk	9	0	2	2	10	1998-1999	1	D	1968-07-22	Taber, Canada	Minor Pro
David Struch	29	3	11	14	18	2001-2002	1	C	1971-02-11	Flin Flon, Canada	Major League
Travis Thiessen	28	2	11	13	28	1998-1999	1	D	1972-07-11	North Battleford, Canada	Minor Pro
Steve Thornton	15	3	7	10	8	2001-2002	1	C	1973-03-08	Gloucester, Canada	Minor Pro
Mikael Tjallden	33	0	2	2	63	2000-2001	1	D	1975-02-16	Sollefteå, Sweden	European Elite
David Trofimenkoff	54	0	2	2	2	2001-2003	2	G	1975-01-20	Calgary, Canada	European Lower Leagues
David Vallieres	8	2	2	4	8	2000-2001	1	L	1974-07-14	Juneau, United States	Minor Pro
Darby Walker	29	1	3	4	60	2000-2001	1	F	1974-08-05	Beaverlodge, Canada	Minor Pro
Shawn Wansborough	11	0	2	2	57	1999-2000	1	L	1974-06-03	Deseronto, Canada	Minor Pro
Mike Ware	61	8	6	14	123	1999-2002	2	R	1967-03-22	York, Canada	Major League
Todd Wetzel	33	11	11	22	22	1999-2000	1	C	1973-09-03	Sarnia, Canada	Minor Pro
Ken Wotherspoon	1	0	0	0	0	1998-1999	1	G	1978-06-01	United Kingdom	European Lower Leagues
Brendan Yarema	39	17	16	33	139	2000-2001	1	C	1976-07-16	Sault Ste. Marie, Canada	Minor Pro
