= David Struch =

Canadian ice hockey player and coach

- Born: February 11, 1971 (age 55) Flin Flon, Manitoba, Canada
- Height: 5 ft 10 in (178 cm)
- Weight: 181 lb (82 kg; 12 st 13 lb)
- Position: Centre
- Shot: Left
- Played for: Calgary Flames; Salt Lake Golden Eagles; Saint John Flames; EC Graz; Waco Wizards; SG Cortina; HC Milano; Nottingham Panthers; London Knights; Bracknell Bees; Missouri River Otters; Kalamazoo Wings; Starbulls Rosenheim
- NHL draft: 195th overall, 1991; Calgary Flames
- Playing career: 1992–2005

David Struch (born February 11, 1971) is a Canadian former professional ice hockey centre and the current head coach of the Red Deer Rebels of the Western Hockey League. As a player, he played for the Calgary Flames in the NHL, as well as in the minor leagues, and across Europe.

== Playing career ==
Struch began his major junior career with the Saskatoon Blades of the WHL in 1988. Following the 1990–91 season in which he scored 102 points in 72 games Struch was selected 195th overall in the 1992 NHL entry draft by the Calgary Flames. At the end of the 1991–92 season, the Blades had an extended playoff run, reaching the finals. The Blades would ultimately lose to the Kamloops Blazers. In total, Struch totaled 285 points in 253 games with the Blades.

The 1991–92 season would also see Struch turn professional, playing for the Salt Lake Golden Eagles of the IHL who served as the Flames affiliate team, with whom he scored 5 points in 12 games. He returned to the Golden Eagles the following season, scoring 42 points in 78 games. The 1993–94 season would see Struch mainly play with the Saint John Flames, who took over as Calgary's primary affiliate team, with whom he scored 43 points in 58 games. On 5 January 1994, Struch made his NHL debut at Madison Square Garden against the New York Rangers. he would play 3 further games with Calgary, registering no points.

Early the following season with Saint John, Struch suffered a serious knee injury which ultimately kept him from playing for 16 months. He returned to the Saint John lineup during the 1995–96 season, registering 25 points in 45 games. The 1996–97 season saw Struch play 11 games with the Waco Wizards of the WPHL, scoring at a point-per-game rate. He also played 26 games for Austrian side EC Graz, registering 22 points. He remained in Europe the following season, signing for the Italian Serie A team SG Cortina. In Veneto he had a career year, scoring 61 points in 44 games helping the team make it to the playoffs, before losing in the opening round to HC Bolzano. The 1998-99 would see Struch remain in Italy, signing for the HC Milano where he would have 11 points in 24 games.

Struch would move to the U.K. for the 1999–00 season, to play for BISL team Nottingham Panthers. The team struggled, finishing 6th out of 8 teams, and failing to make it out of the group stages in the playoffs. For his part, Struch scored 24 points in 42 games. He returned to the Panthers the following season, and improved his scoring totals, registering 39 points in 47 games. The off-season saw Struch move to the London Knights also of the BISL, where he was named team captain. His time in the capital got off to a bad start however, as he suffered another knee injury early in the season. Despite this setback, he managed to score 14 points in 29 games as the team finished 6th out of 7 teams, and made it to the playoff semi-finals before narrowly losing to the Sheffield Steelers.

For the 2002–03 season, Struch moved to the Bracknell Bees also of the BISL. At the Bees, he got his first taste of coaching. Both the team and Struch would struggle, the team finished last in the regular season, and Struch registered 10 points in 28 games, after missing 4 games with a concussion. Following the culmination of the 2002–03 season, the Bees decided to drop down to the BNL, whilst the Ayr Scottish Eagles and Manchester Storm both folded and the London Knights rink, the London Arena, was sold to developers, which lead to the Knights folding as well. These losses culminated in the demise of the BISL.

Following the collapse of the BISL, a new top tier of hockey in the U.K. was formed, the Elite Ice Hockey League, made up of the three remaining BISL franchises and five other teams. Struch re-joined the Nottingham Panthers, one of the founding members of the EIHL, linking up with former Knights team-mates David Clarke and Kim Ahlroos. He had a strong season, scoring 41 points in 56 games as the Panthers finished 2nd in the regular season and narrowly lost in the play-off finals. The club would win silverware however, lifting the Challenge Cup. The 2004–05 season was a nomadic one for Struch, originally playing for German Oberliga side Starbulls Rosenheim. He scored 18 points in 18 games before returning to North America to play for the Missouri River Otters of the UHL. He only played 2 games with the Otters, before closing out the season with the Kalamazoo Wings. Subsequently, Struch retired as a professional hockey player.

== Awards and achievements ==
- EIHL Challenge Cup (2004)

== Career statistics ==
			Regular season					Playoffs
Season	Team	League	GP	G	A	Pts	PIM	GP	G	A	Pts	PIM
1988–89	Saskatoon Blades	WHL	66	20	31	51	18	8	2	3	5	6
1989–90	Saskatoon Blades	WHL	68	40	37	77	67	10	8	5	13	6
1990–91	Saskatoon Blades	WHL	72	45	57	102	69	—	—	—	—	—
1991–92	Saskatoon Blades	WHL	47	29	26	55	34	22	8	15	23	26
1991–92	Salt Lake Golden Eagles	IHL	12	4	1	5	8	—	—	—	—	—
1992–93	Salt Lake Golden Eagles	IHL	78	20	22	42	73	—	—	—	—	—
1993–94	Calgary Flames	NHL	4	0	0	0	4	—	—	—	—	—
1993–94	Saint John Flames	AHL	58	18	25	43	87	7	0	1	1	4
1994–95	Saint John Flames	AHL	7	0	1	1	4	—	—	—	—	—
1995–96	Saint John Flames	AHL	45	10	15	25	57	3	0	1	1	4
1996–97	EC Graz	Austria	26	6	16	22	18	—	—	—	—	—
1996–97	Waco Wizards	WPHL	11	4	7	11	0	—	—	—	—	—
1997–98	SG Cortina	Italy	44	24	37	61	34	—	—	—	—	—
1998–99	HC Milano	Italy	24	7	4	11	16	—	—	—	—	—
1999–00	Nottingham Panthers	BISL	42	8	16	24	22	6	0	1	1	0
2000–01	Nottingham Panthers	BISL	47	17	22	39	40	6	2	4	6	2
2001–02	London Knights	BISL	29	3	11	14	18	7	0	3	3	6
2002–03	Bracknell Bees	BISL	28	4	6	10	20	16	0	3	3	4
2003–04	Nottingham Panthers	EIHL	56	11	30	41	18	6	1	2	3	4
2004–05	Missouri River Otters	UHL	2	0	0	0	2	—	—	—	—	—
2004–05	Kalamazoo Wings	UHL	35	8	14	22	24	—	—	—	—	—
2004–05	Starbulls Rosenheim	Germany3	18	4	14	18	20	3	1	2	3	2
NHL totals			4	0	0	0	4	—	—	—	—	—
AHL totals			110	28	41	69	148	—	—	—	—	—

== Coaching career ==
Struch began his coaching career in 2006, when he signed as an assistant coach for the Saskatoon Blades, a position he remained in until 2013 when was named Head Coach of the team, replacing Lorne Molleken. The team would struggle however, finishing the season with only 16 wins. As a result, Struch's contract was not extended.

In the off-season, Struch signed with the Regina Pats as an assistant coach, in May 2015 his role grew, also taking on the duties of Assistant General Manager, under Head Coach and GM John Paddock. In June 2018, the Pats promoted Struch to Head Coach after Paddock chose to focus solely on his GM duties. Under this guidance the Pats have performed admirably, however, the team hasn't been able to make it to the playoffs.

In addition to his duties with the Pats, Struch is also involved with the Canadian national junior teams, having served as an Assistant Coach for Team Canada during the 2016 World U-17 Hockey Challenge. The following year he was named Head Coach of the same team. In 2019 he was part of the Team Canada coaching team at the IIHF World U18 Championship.

Struch was relieved of his duties as the head coach of the Pats on November 18, 2021.

== Personal life ==
Struch is married to his wife, Andrea, and has three children.
