= Mike Ware (ice hockey) =

Canadian ice hockey player

- Born: March 22, 1967 (age 59) York, Ontario, Canada
- Height: 6 ft 5 in (196 cm)
- Weight: 216 lb (98 kg; 15 st 6 lb)
- Position: Right wing
- Shot: Right
- Played for: Edmonton Oilers; Nova Scotia Oilers; Cape Breton Oilers; Murrayfield Racers; Cardiff Devils; Sheffield Steelers; Hannover Scorpions; London Knights
- NHL draft: 62nd overall, 1985; Edmonton Oilers
- Playing career: 1987–2004

Michael Ware (born March 22, 1967) is a Canadian former professional ice hockey player who played for the Edmonton Oilers, as well as in Europe, where he was primarily an enforcer.

== Playing career ==
Ware began his major junior career with the Hamilton Steelhawks of the OHL in 1984, having been drafted 26th overall in the 1984 OHL priority selection. At the end of his rookie season with the Steelhawks, he was selected by the Edmonton Oilers, 62nd overall in the 1985 NHL entry draft. He played a second season in Hamilton, before moving to the Cornwall Royals. Following his season in Eastern Ontario he turned professional.

Ware signed with the Oilers AHL affiliate Nova Scotia Oilers where he registered 253 PIM and 8 points as a rookie during the 1987-88 season. The farm team relocated within the province and became the Cape Breton Oilers. Ware remained with the team, but also played two games in the NHL, making his debut in January 1989 in a game against the Los Angeles Kings, where early in his first (and only) shift of the night, he fought Jay Miller. In his next game against the Vancouver Canucks, Ware registered his only point in the NHL, an assist on a Miroslav Fryčer goal. Whilst playing for the affiliate team, his production increased, tallying 12 points and 317 PIM whilst in Cape Breton. For the 1989-90 season, Ware primarily played in Cape Breton, whilst also playing 3 games in NHL. Ware returned to Nova Scotia for the 1990-91 season, registering 12 points and 176 PIM in 43 games. During his time in Cape Breton, Ware received a 20-game suspension for breaking his stick over the glass, and subsequently throwing it at a referee.

For the 1991-92 season, Ware moved to the U.K. to play for the Murrayfield Racers of the British Hockey League. In Edinburgh he had a stellar season, scoring 60 points in 33 games, whilst also accruing 218 PIM. The team finished 2nd in the league, before being beaten 9-0 in the playoff semifinals to eventual champions the Cardiff Devils. Ware returned to the Racers for the following season, again increasing his scoring output, with 71 points in 43 games; the team finished mid-table and didn't make it out the group stages during the playoffs. The team changed its name to the Edinburgh Racers for the 1994-95 season, which saw Ware have a career year, with 79 points in 40 games, and the Racers reached the playoff final, ultimately losing to the Sheffield Steelers. The following season, Ware remained in the BHL, but moved to the Cardiff Devils, beginning his association with the club. The Devils had a strong season, finishing 2nd in the league, but they crashed out in the group stages of the playoffs.

Following the culmination of the 1995-96 season, the BHL folded, and the BISL took its place as the top tier of hockey in the U.K., of which Cardiff was a founding member. Ware remained with the team and was named captain. In the maiden BISL season, The Devils were named league champions, however, they lost in the play semifinals to eventual winners Sheffield Steelers. Ware subsequently joined the Steelers in the off-season, but the team struggled, thanks in no small part to the Ayr Scottish Eagles completing the British Grand Slam. For the 1998-99 season, Ware moved to Germany, to play for DEL side Hannover Scorpions. There, Ware managed only 6 points in 44 games, whilst registering 103 PIM. Ware returned to the U.K. the following season, signing for the London Knights. With the Knights, Ware totalled 8 points and 90 PIM in 26 games, as the Knights were crowned British champions after beating the Newcastle Riverkings 7-3 in the playoff final.

Ware returned to the Devils for the 2000-01 season, where he registered 10 points and 155 PIM in 40 games. The team performed well, finishing 2nd in the league, however, they didn't make it past the group stages in the playoffs. At the end of the season the Cardiff Devils went into voluntary liquidation, and as a result, were stripped of their BISL franchise. The team eventually reformed and participated in the British National League, which was at the time the second tier of ice hockey in the UK. As a result, Ware moved back to the London Knights for the following season, linking up with former Devils teammates Ian MacIntyre, Kim Ahlroos, Steve Thornton and Vezio Sacratini. The team struggled, finishing 6th out of 7 teams, with Ware producing only 6 points and 33 PIM in 35 games.

The Terminator, as he was known to fans, returned to the Welsh capital for the third time and was named team captain for the 2002-03 season. The Devils made it to the BNL finals, ultimately losing to the Coventry Blaze. Ware had a good season, tallying 32 points and 96 PIM in 30 games.

Following the culmination of the 2002-03 season, the London Knights, as well as the Manchester Storm and Ayr Scottish Eagles all folded, whilst the Bracknell Bees dropped down the BNL. This resulted in the demise of the BISL. Cardiff was a founding member of the EIHL, which became the new top tier of hockey in the U.K., and as such Ware remained with the team for the inaugural EIHL season where he remained as team captain. During the season, the Devils awarded Ware a testimonial game as a result of his service with the team, and popularity with the fans. The team reached the playoff semifinals, before losing to the Sheffield Steelers, following which Ware retired from hockey.

== Awards and achievements ==
- BISL League champion (1997)
- British champion (2000)

== Career statistics ==
			Regular season					Playoffs
Season	Team	League	GP	G	A	Pts	PIM	GP	G	A	Pts	PIM
1983–84	Mississauga Reps Midget AAA	GTHL	30	14	20	34	50	—	—	—	—	—
1984–85	Hamilton Steelhawks	OHL	57	4	14	18	225	12	0	1	1	29
1985–86	Hamilton Steelhawks	OHL	44	8	11	19	155	—	—	—	—	—
1986–87	Cornwall Royals	OHL	50	5	19	24	173	5	0	1	1	10
1987–88	Nova Scotia Oilers	AHL	52	0	8	8	253	3	0	0	0	16
1988–89	Edmonton Oilers	NHL	2	0	1	1	11	—	—	—	—	—
1988–89	Cape Breton Oilers	AHL	48	1	11	12	317	—	—	—	—	—
1989–90	Edmonton Oilers	NHL	3	0	0	0	4	—	—	—	—	—
1989–90	Cape Breton Oilers	AHL	54	6	13	19	191	6	0	3	3	29
1990–91	Cape Breton Oilers	AHL	43	4	8	12	176	3	0	0	0	4
1992–93	Murrayfield Racers	BHL	33	26	34	60	218	7	10	7	17	24
1993–94	Murrayfield Racers	BHL	43	30	41	71	162	6	5	5	10	16
1994–95	Edinburgh Racers	BHL	40	38	41	79	218	6	8	6	14	6
1995–96	Cardiff Devils	BHL	32	16	30	46	169	6	0	1	1	37
1996–97	Cardiff Devils	BISL	38	6	12	18	79	5	0	1	1	29
1997–98	Sheffield Steelers	BISL	43	6	8	14	96	9	2	0	2	4
1998–99	Hannover Scorpions	DEL	44	4	2	6	103	—	—	—	—	—
1999–00	London Knights	BISL	26	6	2	8	90	8	0	1	1	8
2000–01	Cardiff Devils	BISL	40	2	8	10	155	6	1	3	4	8
2001–02	London Knights	BISL	35	2	4	6	33	—	—	—	—	—
2002–03	Cardiff Devils	BNL	30	12	20	32	96	10	3	5	8	43
2003–04	Cardiff Devils	EIHL	47	8	14	22	167	4	3	1	4	4
NHL totals			5	0	1	1	15	—	—	—	—	—
AHL totals			197	11	40	51	937	12	0	3	3	49
BISL totals			182	22	34	56	453	28	3	5	8	49

== Personal life ==
Ware's nephew Phil Oreskovic, was also a professional hockey player, having played 10 games for the Toronto Maple Leafs, as well as in various North American minor leagues.

His son, Cameron Ware, plays for Scottish National League team, the Whitley Warriors.
