= Brendan Yarema =

Canadian ice hockey player

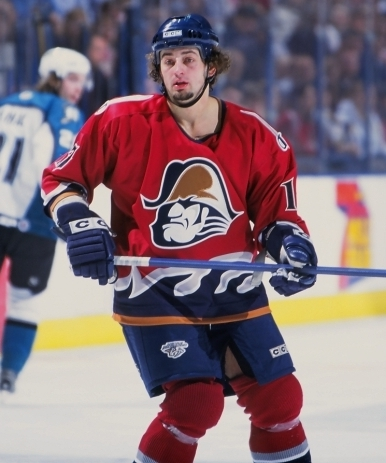
- Yarema with the Milwaukee Admirals during the 2004-05 season
- Born: July 16, 1976 (age 50) Sault Ste. Marie, Ontario, Canada
- Height: 6 ft 0 in (183 cm)
- Weight: 194 lb (88 kg; 13 st 12 lb)
- Position: Centre
- Shot: Left
- Played for: South Carolina Stingrays; St. John's Maple Leafs; Kentucky Thoroughblades; Kansas City Blades; London Knights; Houston Aeros; Cincinnati Mighty Ducks; Charlotte Checkers; Chicago Wolves; Bridgeport Sound Tigers; Milwaukee Admirals; Augsburger Panther; SC Langnau; Rögle BK; Olimpija Ljubljana
- NHL draft: Undrafted
- Playing career: 1990–2006

Brendan Yarema (born July 16, 1976) is a Canadian former professional ice hockey centre who played in North American minor leagues and throughout Europe.

== Career ==
Yarema played junior hockey for the Newmarket Royals of the OHL starting in the 1993–94 season. Following the culmination of the season, the team was sold to the Ciccarelli brothers and moved to Sarnia, becoming the Sarnia Sting. Yarema played for the Sting for two further seasons before turning professional.

Yarema began his professional career in 1996 when he joined the ECHL's South Carolina Stingrays, for whom he played 12 regular season games, as well as a further 9 in the playoffs, helping the Stingrays to win the Kelly Cup. During the season he also played for the St. John's Maple Leafs in the AHL, playing 9 games.

In the 1997–98 season, Yarema moved to the Kentucky Thoroughblades also of the AHL, playing 64 games, registering 22 points. Yarema then moved to the IHL's Kansas City Blades for whom he played for two seasons. The London Knights of the BISL was Yarema's team for the 2000–01 season. The Knights fared well both domestically and in continental competition, narrowly losing the IIHF Continental Cup to Swiss outfit ZSC Lions, having beaten the Munich Barons and HC Slovan Bratislava in the final group stage.

Following the year in London, Yarema returned to North America to play for the AHL's Houston Aeros for the 2001–02 season. Yarema stayed in the AHL for the following season for the Cincinnati Mighty Ducks, as well as playing 5 games for the ECHL's Charlotte Checkers. For the 2003-04 AHL season, Yarema played for the Chicago Wolves. The following season, Yarema initially played for the AHL's Bridgeport Sound Tigers before being picked up mid-season by the Milwaukee Admirals.

Yarema then moved to Germany in order to play for DEL side Augsburger Panther. He had a career year in south Germany, posting 23 goals and 42 points in 48 games. For the 2006–07 season, Yarema dressed for two teams; SC Langnau in the Swiss NLA, and Swedish side Rögle BK of the HockeyAllsvenskan. Slovenia was Yarema's next port of call, playing in the capital for Olimpija Ljubljana in the EBEL during the 2007–08 season. During the season, Yarema also appeared for Olimpija's Slovenian Ice Hockey League side during the playoffs, where the team lost in the final to HK Jesenice. Yarema played for Olimpija for two further seasons before retiring at the culmination of the 2009–10 season.

== Career statistics ==
=== Regular season and playoffs ===
			Regular season					Playoffs
Season	Team	League	GP	G	A	Pts	PIM	GP	G	A	Pts	PIM
1993–94	Newmarket Royals	OHL	55	11	4	15	69	—	—	—	—	—
1994–95	Sarnia Sting	OHL	58	24	25	49	103	4	1	1	2	13
1995–96	Sarnia Sting	OHL	48	36	32	68	93	3	0	4	4	2
1996–97	South Carolina Stingrays	ECHL	12	3	6	9	28	9	1	0	1	38
1996–97	St. John's Maple Leafs	AHL	9	1	4	5	8	—	—	—	—	—
1997–98	Kentucky Thoroughblades	AHL	64	8	14	22	172	3	0	0	0	0
1998–99	Kansas City Blades	IHL	69	11	21	32	163	3	0	0	0	12
1999–00	Kansas City Blades	IHL	34	3	11	14	26	8	1	3	4	4
2000–01	London Knights	BISL	39	17	16	33	139	8	0	0	0	6
2001–02	Houston Aeros	AHL	77	18	13	31	150	14	9	4	11	15
2002–03	Cincinnati Mighty Ducks	AHL	59	19	16	35	11	—	—	—	—	—
2002–03	Charlotte Checkers	ECHL	5	5	0	5	20	—	—	—	—	—
2003–04	Chicago Wolves	AHL	63	16	17	33	151	10	0	2	2	25
2004–05	Bridgeport Sound Tigers	AHL	25	6	11	17	58	—	—	—	—	—
2004–05	Milwaukee Admirals	AHL	16	3	3	6	24	—	—	—	—	—
2005–06	Augsburger Panther	DEL	48	23	19	42	129	—	—	—	—	—
2006–07	SC Langnau	NLA	4	0	1	1	4	—	—	—	—	—
2006–07	Rögle BK	SWE-2	5	2	3	5	12	5	0	1	1	6
2007–08	Olimpija Ljubljana	EBEL	35	18	13	31	104	—	—	—	—	—
2007–08	Olimpija Ljubljana	SLO	—	—	—	—	—	6	5	3	8	22
2008–09	Olimpija Ljubljana	EBEL	38	12	18	30	80	—	—	—	—	—
2008–09	Olimpija Ljubljana	SLO	—	—	—	—	—	1	0	0	0	0
2009–10	Olimpija Ljubljana	EBEL	26	7	8	15	47	—	—	—	—	—
AHL totals			313	71	78	149	674	31	9	6	15	53
