= 1977 in ice hockey =

The following is a chronicle of events during the year 1977 in ice hockey.

== National Hockey League ==
- Art Ross Trophy as the NHL's leading scorer during the regular season: Guy Lafleur
- Hart Memorial Trophy: for the NHL's Most Valuable Player: Guy Lafleur
- Stanley Cup - the Montreal Canadiens defeat the Boston Bruins in 1977 Stanley Cup Finals
- With the first overall pick in the 1977 NHL Amateur Draft, Dale McCourt was selected by the Detroit Red Wings.

== World Hockey Association ==
- The Quebec Nordiques won the Account World Trophy for the only time in franchise history

== Canadian Hockey League ==
- Ontario Hockey League: J. Ross Robertson Cup.
- Quebec Major Junior Hockey League: won President's Cup (QMJHL) for the first time in team history
- Western Hockey League: President's Cup (WHL) for the first time in team history
- Memorial Cup:

== Minor League hockey ==
- AHL: Calder Cup
- IHL: Turner Cup.
- Allan Cup:

== University hockey ==
NCAA Division I Men's Ice Hockey Tournament

== Births ==
- January 2 – Aleš Píša, Czech ice hockey player
- January 31 – Mark Dutiaume, Canadian winger
- February 7 – Paul Comrie, Canadian forward
- May 31 – Petr Tenkrát, Czech forward
- July 12 – Peter Schaefer, Canadian ice hockey player

== Season articles ==
1976–77 NHL season	1977–78 NHL season
1976–77 AHL season	1977–78 AHL season

== See also ==
- 1977 in sports
