= Rob Kenny =

American ice hockey player (1968–2010)

- Born: October 19, 1968 Bronx, New York, USA
- Died: July 21, 2010 (aged 41) Weston, Florida, USA
- Height: 6 ft 1 in (185 cm)
- Weight: 209 lb (95 kg; 14 st 13 lb)
- Position: Right wing
- Shot: Left
- Played for: Binghamton Rangers; Los Angeles Ice Dogs; Miami Matadors; Orlando Solar Bears; London Knights
- NHL draft: Undrafted
- Playing career: 1992–2000

Robert J. Kenny (October 19, 1968 – July 21, 2010) was an American professional ice hockey player who played in various minor Leagues in North America, as well as in Great Britain.

== Career ==
Kenny played junior hockey with the Waterloo Black Hawks of the United States Hockey League. During his time in the USHL he was named to the South Division's All Star team for the 1988-89 season. Following two years in the USHL, he walked on to the Northeastern Huskies, where he played for three years. In his final season with the Huskies he was named Assistant Captain and was named the team's Most Valuable Player.

Kenny began his professional career in 1992 with the Binghamton Rangers of the AHL, a team he played for three seasons. In 1995 he joined the Long Beach Ice Dogs in the IHL, again for three seasons. Following his stint in Long Beach, Kenny played for two teams during the 1998-99 season; the Miami Matadors of the ECHL and the Orlando Solar Bears of the IHL. Kenny then moved overseas and played for the London Knights in the BISL, where he was named team Captain and lead the team in scoring with 40 points in 39 games. The Knights would go on to win the playoffs, beating the Newcastle Riverkings 7-3 in the final to be crowned British Champions. Kenny was named as an BISL All-Star at the culmination of the season.

== Career statistics ==
=== Regular Season and Playoffs ===
			Regular season					Playoffs
Season	Team	League	GP	G	A	Pts	PIM	GP	G	A	Pts	PIM
1989–90	Northeastern Huskies	HE	32	2	7	9	20	—	—	—	—	—
1990–91	Northeastern Huskies	HE	29	6	11	17	40	—	—	—	—	—
1991–92	Northeastern Huskies	HE	34	19	14	33	44	—	—	—	—	—
1992–93	Binghamton Rangers	AHL	66	12	11	23	56	8	2	4	6	8
1993-94	Binghamton Rangers	AHL	66	27	14	41	90	—	—	—	—	—
1994-95	Binghamton Rangers	AHL	17	2	9	11	32	13	6	10	16	16
1995-96	Los Angeles Ice Dogs	IHL	74	15	19	34	124	—	—	—	—	—
1996-97	Los Angeles Ice Dogs	IHL	76	18	15	33	127	18	4	2	6	44
1997-98	Los Angeles Ice Dogs	IHL	59	7	10	17	72	14	0	3	3	14
1998-99	Miami Matadors	ECHL	58	22	20	42	62	—	—	—	—	—
	Orlando Solar Bears	IHL	20	9	5	14	10	9	0	1	1	16
1999-00	London Knights	BISL	39	17	23	40	63	-	-	-	-	-

== Awards ==
- BISL First Team All Star (1999-00)

== Death ==
Kenny died on July 21, 2010, as a result of a traffic collision. He is survived by his wife Janelle, and their three children: Ryan, Sean and Ella.
