= Greg Smyth =

Canadian ice hockey player

- Born: April 23, 1966 Oakville, Ontario, Canada
- Died: February 16, 2018 (aged 51) St. John's, Newfoundland, Canada
- Height: 6 ft 4 in (193 cm)
- Weight: 235 lb (107 kg; 16 st 11 lb)
- Position: Defence
- Shot: Right
- Played for: Philadelphia Flyers; Quebec Nordiques; Calgary Flames; Florida Panthers; Toronto Maple Leafs; Chicago Blackhawks
- NHL draft: 22nd overall, 1984; Philadelphia Flyers
- Playing career: 1986–2000

Greg “Bird Dog” Smyth (April 23, 1966 – February 16, 2018) was a Canadian professional ice hockey defenceman who played ten seasons in the National Hockey League (NHL).

== Playing career ==
Smyth was born in Oakville, Ontario. As a youth, he played in the 1979 Quebec International Pee-Wee Hockey Tournament with a minor ice hockey team from Mississauga.

He later played in the NHL for the Philadelphia Flyers, Quebec Nordiques, Calgary Flames, Florida Panthers, Toronto Maple Leafs, and Chicago Blackhawks. He was known as an enforcer during his playing career.

Playing the final three seasons of his career within the Maple Leafs organization, primarily with the St. John's Maple Leafs of the AHL, Smyth embarked on a coaching career in the 1999–2000 season with St. John's as an assistant coach. Less than a month into the season, Smyth got into a physical altercation with St. John’s forwards David Nemirovsky and Jason Bonsignore in Portland, Maine after a game against the Portland Pirates, and he was let go the next day.

Smyth briefly returned to playing, playing 9 games with the London Knights of the British Superleague, before ending his professional career.

Coached the Junior Celtics in the St. John's Junior Hockey League, winning the prestigious Veitch Trophy in 2001.

== Death ==
Smyth resided in St. John’s, Newfoundland and Labrador following the end of his playing career.

Smyth died of cancer on February 16, 2018, at the age of 51.

== Career statistics ==
			Regular season					Playoffs
Season	Team	League	GP	G	A	Pts	PIM	GP	G	A	Pts	PIM
1983–84	London Knights	OHL	64	4	21	25	252	6	1	0	1	24
1984–85	London Knights	OHL	47	7	16	23	188	8	2	2	4	27
1985–86	London Knights	OHL	46	12	42	54	197	4	1	2	3	28
1985–86	Hershey Bears	AHL	2	0	1	1	5	8	0	0	0	60
1986–87	Hershey Bears	AHL	35	0	2	2	158	2	0	0	0	19
1986–87	Philadelphia Flyers	NHL	1	0	0	0	0	1	0	0	0	2
1987–88	Hershey Bears	AHL	21	0	10	10	102	—	—	—	—	—
1987–88	Philadelphia Flyers	NHL	47	1	6	7	192	5	0	0	0	38
1988–89	Halifax Citadels	AHL	43	3	9	12	310	4	0	1	1	35
1988–89	Quebec Nordiques	NHL	10	0	1	1	70	—	—	—	—	—
1989–90	Halifax Citadels	AHL	49	5	14	19	235	6	1	0	1	52
1989–90	Quebec Nordiques	NHL	13	0	0	0	57	—	—	—	—	—
1990–91	Halifax Citadels	AHL	56	6	23	29	340	—	—	—	—	—
1990–91	Quebec Nordiques	NHL	1	0	0	0	0	—	—	—	—	—
1991–92	Halifax Citadels	AHL	9	1	3	4	35	—	—	—	—	—
1991–92	Quebec Nordiques	NHL	29	0	2	2	138	—	—	—	—	—
1991–92	Calgary Flames	NHL	7	1	1	2	15	—	—	—	—	—
1992–93	Salt Lake Golden Eagles	IHL	5	0	1	1	31	—	—	—	—	—
1992–93	Calgary Flames	NHL	35	1	2	3	95	—	—	—	—	—
1993–94	Florida Panthers	NHL	12	1	0	1	37	—	—	—	—	—
1993–94	Toronto Maple Leafs	NHL	11	0	1	1	38	—	—	—	—	—
1993–94	Chicago Blackhawks	NHL	38	0	0	0	108	6	0	0	0	0
1994–95	Indianapolis Ice	IHL	2	0	0	0	0	—	—	—	—	—
1994–95	Chicago Blackhawks	NHL	22	0	3	3	33	—	—	—	—	—
1995–96	Chicago Wolves	IHL	15	1	3	4	53	—	—	—	—	—
1995–96	Los Angeles Ice Dogs	IHL	41	2	7	9	231	—	—	—	—	—
1996–97	St. John's Maple Leafs	AHL	43	2	4	6	273	5	0	1	1	14
1996–97	Toronto Maple Leafs	NHL	2	0	0	0	0	—	—	—	—	—
1997–98	St. John's Maple Leafs	AHL	63	5	6	11	353	4	0	1	1	6
1998–99	St. John's Maple Leafs	AHL	40	0	7	7	159	5	0	1	1	19
1999–00	London Knights	BISL	9	0	0	0	42	—	—	—	—	—
AHL totals			361	22	79	101	1970	34	1	4	5	208
NHL totals			228	4	16	20	783	12	0	0	0	40
