= Andy Bezeau =

Canadian ice hockey player

- Born: March 30, 1970 (age 56) Saint John, New Brunswick, Canada
- Height: 5 ft 9 in (175 cm)
- Weight: 185 lb (84 kg; 13 st 3 lb)
- Position: Left wing
- Shot: Left
- Played for: Moncton Hawks; Phoenix Roadrunners; Fort Wayne Komets; Michigan K-Wings; Detroit Vipers; Providence Bruins
- NHL draft: 231st overall, 1990; Boston Bruins
- Playing career: 1991–2001

Andy Bezeau (born March 30, 1970) is a Canadian former professional ice hockey player who played 10 seasons in the minor leagues.

== Playing career ==
After being drafted by the Boston Bruins in the 11th round of the 1990 NHL entry draft, Bezeau reported to the Bruins ECHL affiliate in Johnstown. Despite scoring 11 goals and 21 points in 28 games, Bezeau was traded to the Richmond Renegades for future considerations.

Bezeau moved to the Colonial Hockey League for the 1992–93 and 1993–94 and had back to back 18 goal, 240 PIM seasons. He returned to the ECHL for the end of the 1993–94 season as a member of the South Carolina Stingrays. Bezeau only played 36 games with the Stingrays but recorded 20 points. Bezeau also totals 352 penalty minutes, which was the second highest total in the league. Trevor Buchanan, a former Hartford Whalers draft pick, recorded 422 penalty minutes - 70 more than Bezeau - but also played in 29 more games than Bezeau.

After splitting the 1994–95 season with the Brantford Smoke and the Muskegon Fury, Bezeau spent his next four seasons in the IHL. Bezeau recorded a record 590 penalty minutes during the 1995-96 IHL season, 176 more than Las Vegas Thunder forward Sasha Lakovic.

Bezeau was involved with one of the IHL's strangest trades at the start of the 1996–97 season. Bezeau was upset with the Komets and demanded a trade, even going as far as attending training camp with the Michigan K-Wings while still officially being a member of the Komets' roster. Bezeau would officially be traded to the K-Wings for "future considerations", which ended up being two equipment dryers that used to be part of the Phoenix Roadrunners organization. Bezeau played one game with the K-Wings before the trade was officially voided by the league. Bezeau would later be traded to the Detroit Vipers.

Bezeau started the 1999–2000 season as a training camp invite to the Tampa Bay Lightning, but he was released and assigned to the Detroit Vipers. Bezeau was released from the Vipers in January 2000 and signed with the London Knights of the Ice Hockey Superleague.

Bezeau played one game with the Providence Bruins and retired in 2001. He retired from the IHL with the 19th highest PIM total in league history despite only playing six seasons in the league. In his ten league career, Bezeau accumulated 3477 penalty minutes, which is 18th highest in minor league history.

== Personal ==
Since his retirement in 2001, Bezeau has been involved in several hockey training schools. He is a certified power skating instructor with Skate Canada.

Bezeau has also formed his own company, AllPro/ExpressHockey Inc., which also offers clinics on advanced skating techniques.

== Career statistics ==
			Regular season					Playoffs
Season	Team	League	GP	G	A	Pts	PIM	GP	G	A	Pts	PIM
1989–90	Niagara Falls Thunder	OHL	60	20	19	39	206	16	6	9	15	73
1990–91	Niagara Falls Thunder	OHL	24	12	12	24	95	14	4	11	15	54
1991–92	Johnstown Chiefs	ECHL	28	11	10	21	142	—	—	—	—	—
1991–92	Richmond Renegades	ECHL	12	1	1	2	71	—	—	—	—	—
1992–93	Brantford Smoke	CoHL	38	18	13	31	278	14	2	4	6	132
1992–93	Moncton Hawks	AHL	2	0	0	0	4	—	—	—	—	—
1993–94	Brantford Smoke	CoHL	22	18	16	34	240	—	—	—	—	—
1993–94	St. Thomas Wildcats	CoHL	1	2	0	2	12	—	—	—	—	—
1993–94	South Carolina Stingrays	ECHL	36	10	10	20	352	2	0	0	0	23
1994–95	Brantford Smoke	CoHL	17	8	10	18	185	—	—	—	—	—
1994–95	Phoenix Roadrunners	IHL	6	0	0	0	23	—	—	—	—	—
1994–95	Muskegon Fury	CoHL	46	14	17	31	357	17	9	7	16	88
1994–95	Fort Wayne Komets	IHL	3	0	1	1	26	—	—	—	—	—
1995–96	Fort Wayne Komets	IHL	74	10	11	21	590	5	0	2	2	28
1996–97	Fort Wayne Komets	IHL	45	4	5	9	320	—	—	—	—	—
1997–98	Muskegon Fury	UHL	17	7	9	16	100	—	—	—	—	—
1997–98	Michigan K-Wings	IHL	1	0	1	1	4	—	—	—	—	—
1997–98	Detroit Vipers	IHL	54	9	10	19	309	19	2	1	3	95
1998–99	Detroit Vipers	IHL	44	2	7	9	308	8	2	1	3	31
1999–00	Detroit Vipers	IHL	19	2	1	3	148	—	—	—	—	—
1999–00	London Knights	BISL	11	1	5	6	44	8	2	2	4	29
2000–01	Providence Bruins	AHL	1	0	0	0	8	—	—	—	—	—
IHL totals			246	27	36	63	1728	32	4	4	8	154
