= Debb Carpenter =

Canadian ice hockey player

- Born: August 11, 1972 (age 53) Edmonton, Alberta, Canada
- Height: 5 ft 11 in (180 cm)
- Weight: 185 lb (84 kg; 13 st 3 lb)
- Position: Right wing
- Shot: Left
- Played for: CHL; San Antonio Iguanas; BISL; London Knights; Ayr Scottish Eagles; BNL; Basingstoke Bison; Hull Thunder
- NHL draft: Undrafted
- Playing career: 1998–2001

Debb Carpenter (born August 11, 1972) is a Canadian former professional ice hockey player.

Carpenter attended the University of Lethbridge before turning professional to play the 1998–99 season in the British Ice Hockey Superleague with the London Knights, with whom he competed for the BH Cup.

On November 22, 2000, he signed with the San Antonio Iguanas, but played only five games with the Central Hockey League team before returning to the United Kingdom. He retired following the 2000–2001 season after competing for the Challenge Cup with the Ayr Scottish Eagles.
