= Domenic Amodeo =

Canadian ice hockey player

- Born: March 6, 1968 (age 57) Toronto, Canada
- Height: 6 ft 0 in (183 cm)
- Weight: 185 lb (84 kg; 13 st 3 lb)
- Position: Left wing
- Shot: Left
- Played for: Providence Bruins; Charlotte Checkers; HC Asiago; Como; 1. EV Weiden; Grasshopper Club Zurich; HC Thurgau; HC Merano; EHC Basel Dragons; London Knights
- National team: Canada
- NHL draft: Undrafted
- Playing career: 1992–2002

Domenic Amodeo (Note: Name often misspelt as 'Dominic Amodeo'.) (born March 6, 1968, in Toronto, Canada) is a Canadian former professional ice hockey player. He played in the minor leagues and throughout Europe.

== Career ==
Amodeo began his collegiate career in 1988 with the New Hampshire Wildcats. During his time in the Hockey East he was a prolific scorer, registering 167 points in 142 games over the four years he was with the program. In his senior year, Amodeo was named as both a Second Team All-American and a member of the Hockey East All-Tournament Team.

Upon graduating, Amodeo signed a professional contract with the Canadian National Team, who, at the time, played exhibition games across North America. The following season, Amodeo signed with the NHL's Boston Bruins, who assigned him to their AHL affiliate team, the Providence Bruins. He was only in Providence for 3 games however, before being reassigned to the Charlotte Checkers. Amodeo subsequently moved to Europe in order to play for Italian Serie A outfit HC Asiago. He remained in Italy the following season, playing for Como in Serie B where he had a career year. The following season, Amodeo moved to German 1st Liga 1. EV Weiden. Amodeo moved to Switzerland for the 1997–98 season, playing for Grasshopper Club Zurich of the NLB. He remained with the team the following season, before moving to HC Thurgau, also of the NLB for the 1999–00 season. He returned to Serie A the following season, with HC Merano.

The 2001-02 saw Amodeo begin with EHC Basel Dragons as injury cover for Steve Potvin who was out with a broken foot. Upon Potvin's return to the line up, Amodeo moved to the United Kingdom in order to play for the London Knights of the BISL, joining the team of transfer deadline day. Following the culmination of the British season, Amodeo retired from professional hockey.

== Awards and achievements ==
- NCAA (East) Second all-american team (1992)
- NCAA (Hockey East) All-Tournament Team (1992)

== Career statistics ==
=== Regular season and play-offs ===
			Regular season					Play-offs
Season	Team	League	GP	G	A	Pts	PIM	GP	G	A	Pts	PIM
1988-89	New Hampshire Wildcats	HE	32	6	12	18	10	—	—	—	—	—
1989–90	New Hampshire Wildcats	HE	39	19	26	45	12	—	—	—	—	—
1990–91	New Hampshire Wildcats	HE	34	15	22	37	20	—	—	—	—	—
1991–92	New Hampshire Wildcats	HE	37	26	41	67	28	—	—	—	—	—
1993–94	Providence Bruins	AHL	3	0	0	0	2	—	—	—	—	—
1993–94	Charlotte Checkers	ECHL	55	25	49	74	51	—	—	—	—	—
1994-95	HC Asiago	Serie A	34	24	27	51	4	—	—	—	—	—
1995-96	Como	Serie B	35	60	59	119	30	6	8	5	13	6
1996-97	1. EV Weiden	1st Liga	43	55	53	108	32	—	—	—	—	—
1997-98	Grasshopper Club Zurich	NLB	38	37	32	69	24	5	1	3	4	4
1998-99	Grasshopper Club Zurich	NLB	40	27	28	55	34	3	0	0	0	10
1999-00	HC Thurgau	NLB	35	20	25	45	20	5	3	0	3	4
2000-01	HC Merano	Serie A	31	16	16	32	24	—	—	—	—	—
2001-02	EHC Basel Dragons	NLB	11	6	6	12	10	—	—	—	—	—
2001-02	London Knights	BISL	8	5	1	6	2	5	0	0	0	0
AHL totals			3	0	0	0	2	-	-	-	-	-
NLB totals			142	66	101	167	70	13	4	3	7	18

=== International ===
			Regular season					Playoffs
Season	Team	Event	GP	G	A	Pts	PIM	GP	G	A	Pts	PIM
1992-93	Canada	INT	58	20	32	52	24	—	—	—	—	—
	Totals		58	20	32	52	24	—	—	—	—	—

== Post-playing career ==
Amodeo now runs the Olympic Hockey Academy, and has worked with several NHL players, including Robby Fabbri, and Ryan Strome.
