= Mark Dutiaume =

Canadian ice hockey winger

- Born: January 31, 1977 (age 49) Winnipeg, Manitoba, Canada
- Height: 6 ft 0 in (183 cm)
- Weight: 201 lb (91 kg; 14 st 5 lb)
- Position: Left wing
- Shot: Left
- Played for: Rochester Americans; South Carolina Stingrays; B.C. Icemen; London Knights; Fife Flyers; Sheffield Steelers; HC Bolzano; Belfast Giants
- NHL draft: 42nd overall, 1995; Buffalo Sabres
- Playing career: 1997–2008

Mark Dutiaume (born January 31, 1977), is a Canadian former professional ice hockey winger, who played in the minor leagues and in Europe.

== Playing career ==
Dutiaume was selected by the Tri-City Americans in the 1992 WHL Bantam Draft, however, he only played three games with the team, as he was traded to the Brandon Wheat Kings in exchange for overager Jeff Hoad early in his rookie season. Following the 1994-95 season in which he scored 44 points in 62 games and the team made it to the President's Cup final, Dutiaume was selected 42nd overall in the 1995 NHL entry draft by the Buffalo Sabres. He would go on to play two further season with the Wheat Kings, before turning professional.

Dutiaume turned pro following the culmination of the 1996-97 WHL season, playing for the Rochester Americans, the AHL affiliate of the Buffalo Sabres. After his initial six game stint with the Amerks, he returned for the 1997-98 season, splitting time between Rochester and the Sabres ECHL affiliate, the South Carolina Stingrays. The following season, he would play 3 games in Rochester, and spend the rest of the season with the B.C. Icemen of the UHL, who also served as a Sabres affiliate. With the Icemen he had a solid season, scoring 62 points in 67 games whilst helping the team claim the Eastern division, before being knocked out of the playoffs by the Flint Generals.

Dutiaume remained with the Icemen during the 1999-00 season, increasing his scoring to 66 points in 58 games, and again helping the team win their division. The team again made the playoffs, earning a first round bye, before losing in the quarterfinals to the Fort Wayne Komets. During the season, Dutiaume also dressed once for the Americans. The following season, he began with the Icemen, scoring 47 points in 45 games, before moving to the U.K. in order to play for BISL side London Knights. At the Knights he played alongside former Wheat Kings team mate Mark Kolesar, as well as Jeff Hoad. His time in London began slowly, registering 1 point in 10 games during the regular season, however, we would find form in the play-offs, scoring 9 points in 8 games as the Knights narrowly lost the Play-off final to the Sheffield Steelers.

Dutiaume remained in the UK for the 2001-02 season, however, he dropped down a league and signed for the BNL's Fife Flyers. There, he was in fine form, scoring 47 points in just 30 games. However, on the BISL's transfer deadline day, he would sign for the Sheffield Steelers who were looking for a goalscorer following a season-ending injury to then leading scorer Kevin Miehm. The move would pay off, as the Steelers were crowned British champions after beating the Manchester Storm in the final. He remained with the Steelers for the 2002-03 season, winning the Challenge Cup and finishing 1st in the league, before losing in the playoffs to the Belfast Giants. Following the culmination of the 2002-03 season, the London Knights, as well as the Manchester Storm and Ayr Scottish Eagles all folded, whilst the Bracknell Bees dropped down the BNL. This resulted in the demise of the BISL.

Sheffield would be a founding member of the EIHL, which became the new top-tier of hockey in the U.K., and as such Dutiaume remained with the team. He would have a massive season, leading the league in scoring after tallying 88 points in only 53 games, and would subsequently be named as a First Team All-Star. The team would find success as well, finishing 1st at the end of the regular season, and subsequently beating the Nottingham Panthers in the playoff finals to again be crowned British Champions.

For the 2004-05 season, Dutiaume moved to Italy, playing for HC Bolzano of the Serie A, although he would leave the club by December 2004, he nevertheless won silverware, after the team won the Supercoppa Italiana, beating the Milano Vipers. He rejoined the Steelers, however, both he and the team would struggle; the team finished the season 5th, and Duitaume would end the season with 14 points in 22 games. He returned to Sheffield the following year, and was named team captain. he would have another strong season, registering 50 points in 41 games, and was named to the EIHL All-Star Second Team. The team would make it to the playoff finals, before losing to the Newcastle Vipers.

He would move across the Irish Sea for the 2006-07 in order to play for the Belfast Giants. 'Magical' Mark as he was known, would have a solid season in Belfast, registering 64 points in 54 games, helping the team to a 2nd place finish, and narrowly losing in the playoff semifinals to the Nottingham Panthers. Dutiaume would return to Belfast for the following season, registering 55 points in 51 games. The team would finish fourth and go out in the first round of the playoffs. At the culmination of the season, Dutiaume would retire from professional hockey.

He briefly came out of retirement in 2009 to play senior hockey for the Steinbach North Stars in order to challenge for the Allan Cup. In doing so, he once again reunited with Hoad and Kolesar. The team had a successful exhibition season, however, they lost in the Cup semi-finals to the South East Prairie Thunder.

== Awards and achievements ==
- British champion (2002) & (2004)
- BISL League champion (2003)
- Italian Supercup Champion (2004)
- EIHL All-Star First Team (2004)
- EIHL Champion (2004)
- EIHL Top Scorer (2004)
- EIHL All-Star Second Team (2006)

== Career statistics ==
			Regular season					Playoffs
Season	Team	League	GP	G	A	Pts	PIM	GP	G	A	Pts	PIM
1993–94	Tri-City Americans	WHL	3	2	0	2	0	—	—	—	—	—
1993–94	Brandon Wheat Kings	WHL	55	4	7	11	43	12	0	2	2	6
1994–95	Brandon Wheat Kings	WHL	62	23	21	44	80	17	1	2	3	33
1995–96	Brandon Wheat Kings	WHL	7	0	4	4	6	9	2	1	3	12
1996–97	Brandon Wheat Kings	WHL	48	12	11	23	73	6	2	2	4	13
1996–97	Rochester Americans	AHL	6	1	1	2	0	—	—	—	—	—
1997–98	Rochester Americans	AHL	11	1	0	1	4	—	—	—	—	—
1997–98	South Carolina Stingrays	ECHL	28	3	4	7	24	2	0	0	0	2
1998–99	Rochester Americans	AHL	2	0	0	0	0	—	—	—	—	—
1998–99	B.C. Icemen	UHL	67	27	35	62	43	1	1	0	1	0
1999–00	Rochester Americans	AHL	1	0	0	0	0	—	—	—	—	—
1999–00	B.C. Icemen	UHL	58	20	46	66	48	6	0	6	6	11
2000–01	B.C. Icemen	UHL	45	22	25	47	40	—	—	—	—	—
2000–01	London Knights	BISL	10	1	0	1	6	8	2	7	9	0
2001–02	Fife Flyers	BNL	30	21	26	47	26	—	—	—	—	—
2001–02	Sheffield Steelers	BISL	8	0	6	6	4	8	1	2	3	6
2002–03	Sheffield Steelers	BISL	29	9	14	23	26	12	3	5	8	8
2003–04	Sheffield Steelers	EIHL	53	34	54	88	69	6	1	0	1	4
2004–05	HC Bolzano	ITA	18	4	5	9	14	—	—	—	—	—
2004–05	Sheffield Steelers	EIHL	22	6	8	14	22	8	1	1	2	4
2005–06	Sheffield Steelers	EIHL	41	24	26	50	24	8	5	7	12	8
2006–07	Belfast Giants	EIHL	54	24	40	64	52	3	2	2	4	0
2007–08	Belfast Giants	EIHL	51	18	37	55	59	2	0	0	0	0
2008–09	Steinbach North Stars	ACH	20	8	18	26	-	4	2	2	4	0
AHL totals			21	2	1	3	4	—	—	—	—	—
EIHL totals			221	106	165	271	226	27	9	10	19	16

== Personal life ==
Mark's older brother Todd was also a hockey player; the pair played alongside each other on the Fife Flyers. Todd has an extensive history with the Flyers, having played for them for 14 years. As of July 2020, he is serving as the team's head coach, a position he has been in since 2005.
