= Lee Sorochan =

Canadian ice hockey defenceman

- Born: September 9, 1975 (age 50) Edmonton, Alberta, Canada
- Height: 6 ft 0 in (183 cm)
- Weight: 207 lb (94 kg; 14 st 11 lb)
- Position: Defence
- Shot: Left
- Played for: Calgary Flames; London Knights; Jokerit; Eisbären Berlin; Belfast Giants
- NHL draft: 34th overall, 1993; New York Rangers
- Playing career: 1995–2004

Lee Sorochan (born September 9, 1975) is a Canadian former professional ice hockey defenceman. He played three games in the NHL as well in the minor leagues, and across Europe.

== Playing career ==
Sorochan began his major junior career with the Lethbridge Hurricanes of the WHL in 1991, having previously played for the Sherwood Park Kings of the AMBHL. Following the 1992–93 season in which he scored 40 points in 69 games Sorochan was selected 34th overall in the 1993 NHL entry draft by the New York Rangers. Midway through the 1994–95 season, Sorochan was traded along with wingers Dmitiri Markovsky & Mark Szoke to the Saskatoon Blades in exchange for wingers Kirby Law, Steve Roberts and defenceman Mike O'Grady. He would finish the season with the Blades, and subsequently turn professional.

Sorochan turned pro following the culmination of the 1994-95 WHL playoffs, playing for the Binghamton Rangers, the AHL affiliate of the New York Rangers, in the AHL playoffs ultimately losing to the Cornwall Aces. He made his regular season debut with Binghamton during the 1995–96 season, playing 45 games and scoring 10 points. His third season in Binghamton saw an increase in scoring, with Sorochan tallying 31 points in 77 games. In the off-season, the New York Rangers relocated their farm team to Connecticut and renamed the team the Hartford Wolf Pack. Sorochan remained with the team and registered 18 points in 73 games during the 1997–98 season.

The following season, Sorochan split time between the Wolf Pack and IHL side Fort Wayne Komets. On March 23, 1999, Sorochan was traded by the Rangers to the Calgary Flames in exchange for defenceman Chris O'Sullivan. He would go on to make his NHL debut for the Flames four days later against the Phoenix Coyotes. He would play for the Flames again the following day against the Mighty Ducks of Anaheim. Sorochan would finish the season with the Flames farm team the Saint John Flames. He returned to Saint John for 1999–00 season where he had a career year, scoring 41 points in 60 games. He was also called up to Calgary one more time, playing one game against the Nashville Predators.

Sorochan moved to Europe for the 2000–01 season to play for reigning British champions the London Knights of the BISL. He would only play 8 games for the Knights however, as Finnish team Jokerit offered him a contract in December. His time in Helsinki didn't get off to a good start however, as, during the Spengler Cup, he aggravated a persistent back injury and as a result was sidelined until the end of January 2001. Sorochan failed to register a single point in 16 games, whilst the team finished top of the table, but ultimately lost in the opening round of the playoffs to Kärpät. For the 2001–02 season, Sorochan moved to Germany to play for Eisbären Berlin of the DEL. In December, he collided with teammate Boris Blank during practice and damaged a ligament in his knee, resulting in him being out of the lineup for several weeks.

Sorochan returned to the UK for the 2002–03 season, playing for the Belfast Giants. During his time in Northern Ireland he scored 16 points in 31 games, but suffered an eye injury which resulted in him missing the playoff finals, which the Giants won, beating the London Knights 5–3 in the final. He returned to North America for the 2003–04 season, playing for the Long Beach Ice Dogs of the ECHL for whom he played 63 games and tallied 21 points. Subsequently, Kolesar retired from professional hockey.

=== International ===
Sorochan was a member of the gold medal-winning Canadian team at the 1995 World Junior Hockey Championships.

== Transactions ==
- March 23, 1999 - Traded by the New York Rangers to the Calgary Flames in exchange for Chris O'Sullivan.

== Awards and achievements ==
- World Junior Championship Gold Medal (gold) (1995)
- British Champion (2003)

== Career statistics ==
=== Regular season and playoffs ===
			Regular season					Playoffs
Season	Team	League	GP	G	A	Pts	PIM	GP	G	A	Pts	PIM
1990–91	Sherwood Park Flyers Bantam AAA	AMBHL	34	10	17	27	46	—	—	—	—	—
1991–92	Lethbridge Hurricanes	WHL	67	2	9	11	155	5	0	2	2	6
1992–93	Lethbridge Hurricanes	WHL	69	8	32	40	208	4	0	1	1	12
1993–94	Lethbridge Hurricanes	WHL	46	5	27	32	123	9	4	3	7	16
1994–95	Lethbridge Hurricanes	WHL	29	4	15	19	93	—	—	—	—	—
1994–95	Saskatoon Blades	WHL	24	5	13	18	63	10	3	6	9	34
1994–95	Binghamton Rangers	AHL	—	—	—	—	—	8	0	0	0	11
1995–96	Binghamton Rangers	AHL	45	2	8	10	26	1	0	0	0	0
1996–97	Binghamton Rangers	AHL	77	4	27	31	160	4	0	2	2	18
1997–98	Hartford Wolf Pack	AHL	73	7	11	18	197	13	0	2	2	51
1998–99	Fort Wayne Komets	IHL	45	0	10	10	204	—	—	—	—	—
1998–99	Hartford Wolf Pack	AHL	16	0	2	2	33	—	—	—	—	—
1998–99	Calgary Flames	NHL	2	0	0	0	0	—	—	—	—	—
1998–99	Saint John Flames	AHL	3	1	3	4	4	7	3	3	6	29
1999–00	Calgary Flames	NHL	1	0	0	0	0	—	—	—	—	—
1999–00	Saint John Flames	AHL	60	4	37	41	124	3	2	1	3	12
2000–01	London Knights	BISL	8	1	3	4	48	—	—	—	—	—
2000–01	Jokerit	Liiga	16	0	0	0	18	—	—	—	—	—
2001–02	Eisbären Berlin	DEL	48	0	6	6	88	4	0	2	2	18
2002–03	Belfast Giants	BISL	31	2	12	14	99	12	1	2	3	49
2003–04	Long Beach Ice Dogs	ECHL	63	3	18	21	137	—	—	—	—	—
NHL totals			3	0	0	0	0	—	—	—	—	—
AHL totals			274	18	88	106	544	36	5	8	13	121

=== International ===
Year	Team	Event	GP	G	A	Pts	PIM
1995	Canada	WJC	7	0	1	1	6
INT totals			7	0	1	1	6
