= Mikael Tjallden =

Swedish ice hockey player

Mikael Tjälldén
- Born: February 16, 1975 Sollefteå, Sweden
- Height: 6 ft 2 in (188 cm)
- Weight: 194 lb (88 kg; 13 st 12 lb)
- Position: Defence
- Shot: Left
- Played for: Sollefteå HK; Sundsvall/Timrå; Västra Frölunda HC; Tallahassee Tiger Sharks; Syracuse Crunch; Lukko; Asiago; Newcastle Riverkings; London Knights; Skellefteå AIK; Storhamar
- NHL draft: 67th overall, 1993; Florida Panthers
- Playing career: 1990–2006

Mikael Tjälldén (born February 16, 1975) is a Swedish retired professional ice hockey defenceman who played throughout Europe and in North American minor leagues.

== Career ==
As a junior player, Tjälldén represented Ångermanland in the 1990 TV-Pucken. Ångermanland won the silver medal, losing to Skåne in the final.

Tjälldén began his professional career in 1990 with home town club Sollefteå HK in Division 1, whilst also playing Junior hockey for Modo. Following the culmination of the 1992-93 season, Tjälldén was selected in the 1993 NHL entry draft, 67th overall by the Florida Panthers. Tjälldén then moved to Timrå IK, also of Division 1, where he played for 3 seasons. Following his time in Timrå, for the 1996-97 season Tjälldén moved up to the SHL and played for Västra Frölunda HC.

Tjälldén moved to North America for the 1997-98 season to play for the Panthers ECHL affiliate team, the Tallahassee Tiger Sharks. During this season, he also dressed 3 times for the Syracuse Crunch of the AHL. Following his year in North America, Tjälldén returned to Europe this time playing for SM-Liiga outfit Lukko in Finland, as well as Italian Serie A side Asiago.

Tjälldén then moved to the United Kingdom in order to play for the Newcastle Riverkings of the BISL for the 1999-00 season. Tjälldén would stay in the UK for the following season, dressing for the London Knights of the same league. Tjälldén then returned to Sweden to play for Skellefteå AIK in the Allsvenskan for the 2001-02 season.

Tjälldén then moved to Norway to compete for Eliteserien side Storhamar. He would go on to play for the team for 4 years, winning the Eliteserien during the 2002-03 season. On December 13, 2005 whilst playing for Storhamar against Vålerenga, Tjälldén was hit by Aleksander Nervik which resulted in Tjälldén's helmet coming off. Tjälldén then fell, hitting his head on the ice, suffering a fractured skull and a brain bleed. Nervik was suspended for 4 games as a result of the hit. The incident effectively ended Tjälldén's hockey career.

=== International ===
Tjälldén represented Sweden in the 1993 IIHF European Junior Championships, and helped the team win gold with 5 assists in 6 games.

== Career statistics ==
=== Regular season and playoffs ===
			Regular season					Playoffs
Season	Team	League	GP	G	A	Pts	PIM	GP	G	A	Pts	PIM
1990–91	Sollefteå HK	Division 1	6	0	0	0	2	—	—	—	—	—
1993–94	Sundsvall/Timrå	Division 1	26	2	6	8	32	—	—	—	—	—
1994–95	ST Hockey	Division 1	23	0	9	9	24	—	—	—	—	—
1995–96	Timrå IK	Division 1	29	1	4	5	38	—	—	—	—	—
1996-97	Västra Frölunda HC	SHL	32	0	2	2	14	3	0	1	1	4
1997-98	Tallahassee Tiger Sharks	ECHL	37	3	13	16	60	—	—	—	—	—
	Syracuse Crunch	AHL	3	0	1	1	0	—	—	—	—	—
1998-99	Lukko	SM-Liiga	18	0	4	4	26	—	—	—	—	—
	Asiago	Serie A	18	2	12	14	18	—	—	—	—	—
1999-00	Newcastle Riverkings	BISL	34	3	11	14	26	8	1	3	4	4
2000-01	London Knights	BISL	20	9	5	14	10	—	—	—	—	—
2001-02	Skellefteå AIK	Allsvenskan	43	4	8	12	52	6	0	3	3	10
2002-03	Storhamar	Eliteserien	35	7	11	18	65	8	0	1	1	12
2003-04	Storhamar	Eliteserien	31	1	8	9	32	8	0	0	0	10
2004-05	Storhamar	UPC-ligaen	39	1	4	5	58	6	0	1	1	8
2005-06	Storhamar	UPC-ligaen	23	0	5	5	53	—	—	—	—	—
