= Bob Leslie =

Canadian ice hockey coach

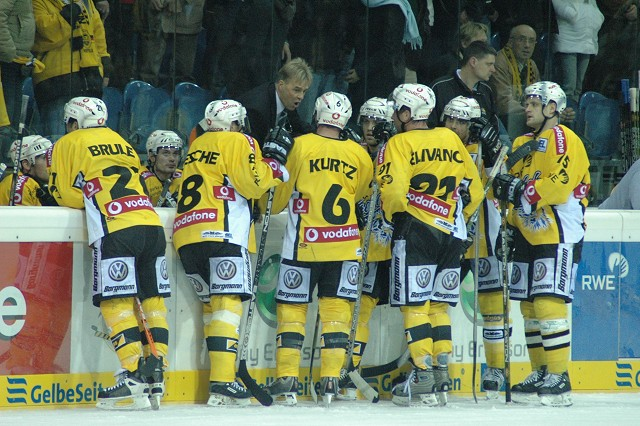
Bob Leslie during his Krefeld stint

Robert David "Bob" Leslie (born January 25, 1950) is a Canadian professional ice hockey coach and executive.

== Career ==
The son of a Scottish father, Leslie was born in Carberry, Manitoba. He attended Brandon University and the University of Winnipeg, where he earned a bachelor of teaching degree.

Leslie did stints as the assistant coach of the Swiss powerhouse EV Zug in 1989-90 and from 1994 to 1999. Under head coach Sean Simpson, he helped Zug win the 1998 Swiss championship. From 1991 to 1994, he coached the Carman Cougars in his native Manitoba.

Leslie took over as the head coach of the German first-division side Kölner Haie on an interim basis in January 1999, and guided the team to the playoff-quarterfinals. He remained on the Haie coaching staff and was named associate coach for the 1999/00 campaign, before being promoted to head coach for the following season. He was sacked in January 2001 after a run of bad results. He then had stints as head coach of the London Knights, VEU Feldkirch in Austria, EHC Basel in Switzerland and the German teams Krefeld Pinguine and EHC Wolfsburg.

In 2006, Leslie joined the Hamburg Freezers of the German Deutsche Eishockey Liga (DEL), first as assistant coach, before being promoted to sport director in January 2008. His contract expired in April 2009. In March 2010, he was named assistant coach of fellow DEL side Düsseldorfer EG and in the same position at Swiss ZSC Lions between February and October 2010.

Leslie was a member of the coaching staff of the Canadian national team on several occasions, winning three Spengler-Cup and two Deutschland-Cup titles.

Leslie is CEO and president of Leslie Global Leadership, a company that runs ice hockey camps. He is also a consultant for Hungarian club Kanadai Magyar Hokiklub SE and helps develop ice hockey facilities in the country.
