= Kim Ahlroos =

Finnish ice hockey player

- Born: July 2, 1971 (age 54) Helsinki, Finland
- Height: 5 ft 10 in (178 cm)
- Weight: 179 lb (81 kg; 12 st 11 lb)
- Position: RW
- Shot: Left
- Played for: HIFK; HC Stadion Hradec Kralove; TuTo Hockey; Hyvinkään Ahmat; KalPa; Podhale Nowy Targ; Newcastle Riverkings; Espoon Palloseura; Karlskrona IK; Cardiff Devils; London Knights; Nottingham Panthers
- NHL draft: Undrafted
- Playing career: 1990–2005

Kim Ahlroos (born July 2, 1971) is a Finnish retired professional ice hockey winger who played in Finland and throughout Europe.

== Career ==
Ahlroos began his career with hometown club HIFK, coming through the junior ranks before making his SM-liiga debut during the 1990–91 season. During this time, Ahlroos also spent time on loan at another Helsinki based club, Karhu-Kissat.

After 4 years with HIFK, Karhu-Kissat and a short stint with Czech Extraliga side HC Stadion Hradec Kralove, Ahlroos moved to another SM-liiga outfit, the Turku-based TuTo Hockey for the 1995–6 season. TuTo would have a disappointing season, which saw them finish last in the standings and subsequently get relegated at the end of the season. Following this, Ahlroos moved to Hyvinkään Ahmat of the I-Divisioona for the 1996–97 season. He would return to the SM-liiga the following season, playing 42 games for KalPa. Following his stint in Kuopio, Ahlroos moved to Poland to play for Podhale Nowy Targ in the Ekstraklasa helping the team finish 3rd overall.

For the 1999–2000 season Ahlroos, alongside Podhale teammate Mikko Koivunoro, would move to the United Kingdom in order to play for BISL outfit Newcastle Riverkings. The Riverkings had been purchased by SM-liiga side Jokerit in the off-season, and installed Jukka Jalonen as head coach. As a result of the Finnish connection, Ahlroos would be one of twelve Finns to dress for the Riverkings over the course of the season.

Following his year in Newcastle, Ahlroos would return to Finland to play for Suomi-sarja side EPS, however, it was a short-lived stint with the team, playing only 7 games. A shorter stint with Swedish Hockeytvåan side Karlskrona IK followed. Ahlroos would then return to the UK for the rest of the season, this time playing for the Cardiff Devils, also of the BISL, where he made an instant impact, scoring on his debut against the London Knights. However, at the end of the season the Cardiff Devils went into voluntary liquidation, and as a result were stripped of their BISL franchise. The team would eventually reform and participate in the British National League, which was at the time the second tier of Ice Hockey in the UK. For the following season, Ahlroos stayed in the BISL joining the reigning league champions, the London Knights, along with fellow Devils teammates Ian MacIntyre, Steve Thornton and Vezio Sacratini.

Ahlroos played for the Knights for two seasons. Following the culmination of the 2002–03 season, in which the Knights lost the playoff final to the Belfast Giants, the team would fold as a result of their rink, the London Arena, being sold to developers. This, coupled with the Ayr Scottish Eagles and Manchester Storm also folding, and the Bracknell Bees deciding to drop down to the BNL, culminated in the demise of the BISL.

The new EIHL would ultimately replace the BISL as the top tier of British hockey, and Ahlroos would sign with the Nottingham Panthers again linking up with Koivunoro. His first season in Nottingham would be a career year, scoring 68 points in 57 games. The Panthers would also win the Challenge Cup beating the Sheffield Steelers, whilst narrowly losing the Play-off final, also to the Steelers. Ahlroos would return to the Panthers for the 2004–05 season, but struggled with the after-effects of a concussion picked up in a match against the Coventry Blaze, only playing 15 games. Ahlroos would subsequently retire at the culmination of the season.

== Career statistics ==
=== Regular season and playoffs ===
| | | | Regular season | | | | | Playoffs |
| Season | Team | League | GP | G | A | Pts | PIM | GP | G | A | Pts | PIM |
|---|---|---|---|---|---|---|---|---|---|---|---|---|
| 1990–91 | HIFK | SM-liiga | 7 | 1 | 1 | 2 | 4 | — | — | — | — | — |
| 1990–91 | HIFK U20 | Jr. A SM-sarja | 4 | 0 | 2 | 2 | 0 | — | — | — | — | — |
| 1990–91 | Karhu-Kissat (loan) | I-Divisioona | 27 | 11 | 17 | 28 | 12 | — | — | — | — | — |
| 1991–92 | HIFK | SM-liiga | 33 | 2 | 5 | 7 | 28 | 5 | 0 | 0 | 0 | 0 |
| 1991–92 | Karhu-Kissat (loan) | I-Divisioona | 2 | 2 | 1 | 3 | 4 | — | — | — | — | — |
| 1991-92 | Urheilukoulu (loan) | Jr. A SM-sarja | 10 | 3 | 15 | 18 | 8 | — | — | — | — | — |
| 1992–93 | HIFK | SM-liiga | 45 | 6 | 8 | 14 | 6 | 3 | 1 | 1 | 2 | 0 |
| 1992–93 | Karhu-Kissat (loan) | I-Divisioona | 5 | 4 | 5 | 9 | 0 | — | — | — | — | — |
| 1993–94 | HIFK | SM-liiga | 34 | 7 | 11 | 18 | 20 | 3 | 0 | 0 | 0 | 0 |
| 1993–94 | Karhu-Kissat (loan) | I-Divisioona | 8 | 6 | 3 | 9 | 10 | — | — | — | — | — |
| 1993-94 | HC Stadion Hradec Kralove | ELH | — | — | — | — | — | 4 | 4 | 2 | 6 | 6 |
| 1994–95 | HIFK | SM-liiga | 27 | 3 | 4 | 7 | 12 | — | — | — | — | — |
| 1995–96 | TuTo Hockey | SM-liiga | 45 | 5 | 12 | 17 | 16 | 5 | 1 | 1 | 2 | 6 |
| 1996-97 | Hyvinkään Ahmat | I-Divisioona | 41 | 17 | 31 | 48 | 24 | — | — | — | — | — |
| 1997-98 | KalPa | SM-liiga | 42 | 3 | 7 | 10 | 26 | 7 | 1 | 1 | 2 | 2 |
| 1998–99 | Podhale Nowy Targ | POL | ? | 10 | 46 | 56 | 49 | ? | 2 | 10 | 12 | 16 |
| 1999-00 | Newcastle Riverkings | BISL | 41 | 14 | 18 | 32 | 4 | 4 | 0 | 0 | 0 | 0 |
| 2000–01 | EPS | Suomi-sarja | 7 | 3 | 6 | 9 | 4 | — | — | — | — | — |
| 2001-02 | Karlskrona IK | Hockeytvåan | 2 | 1 | 0 | 1 | — | — | — | — | — | — |
| 2000-01 | Cardiff Devils | BISL | 38 | 13 | 10 | 23 | 12 | 6 | 3 | 7 | 10 | 6 |
| 2001-02 | London Knights | BISL | 48 | 14 | 15 | 29 | 20 | 7 | 3 | 3 | 6 | 2 |
| 2002-03 | London Knights | BISL | 27 | 6 | 19 | 25 | 12 | 4 | 0 | 1 | 1 | 0 |
| 2003-04 | Nottingham Panthers | EIHL | 56 | 29 | 38 | 67 | 34 | 6 | 2 | 2 | 4 | 2 |
| 2004-05 | Nottingham Panthers | EIHL | 15 | 2 | 8 | 10 | 4 | — | — | — | — | — |
| | Liiga totals | | 233 | 27 | 48 | 75 | 90 | 23 | 3 | 3 | 6 | 8 |
| | BISL totals | | 154 | 47 | 62 | 109 | 48 | 21 | 6 | 11 | 17 | 10 |

=== International ===
| Year | Team | Event | Result | GP | G | A | Pts | PIM |
|---|---|---|---|---|---|---|---|---|
| 1991 | Finland | WJC | 5th | 7 | 2 | 1 | 3 | 4 |
| Junior totals | | | | 30 | 26 | 24 | 50 | 22 |
