= Fayetteville Force =

- City: Fayetteville, North Carolina
- League: Central Hockey League (1997–2001)
- Conference: Eastern
- Founded: 1997
- Operated: 1997–2001
- Home arena: Crown Coliseum
- Colors: Dark green, gold and black
- General manager: Kevin MacNaught 1998-2000
- Head coach: Alan May 1997-1998; David Lohrei 1998-2000; Todd Gordon 2000-2001

Championships
- Regular season titles: 1999 - 2000 Adams Cup

The Fayetteville Force was a professional ice hockey team. based in Fayetteville, North Carolina. The franchise was a member of the Central Hockey League (1997–2001). They played their home games at the Crown Coliseum.

== Background ==
In 1996, the Central Hockey League (CHL) decided to expand eastward, adding privately owned teams for the first time. Bill Coffey, one of the founders of the East Coast Hockey League, applied for a franchise in Fayetteville, North Carolina. The Cape Fear region had a population of close to a quarter of a million people and was the home of Fort Bragg, one of the largest military posts in the world.

On June 17, 1997, it was announced that Fayetteville would become a member of the CHL. The team was named the Force in honor of the military base and would play its home games at the new Crown Coliseum.

In its first season the team was a financial success, drawing an average of almost 4,000 spectators a game during the 1997–98 season. The triumph of the first year relied upon more than just the northern-raised servicemen and other such transplants who were hockey fans. The novelty of the new Crown Coliseum was a draw in the first year, as were hockey fights and “zany” promotions such as a between-periods contest of shooting the puck at empty beer cartons placed along the goal line - hitting a carton meant that the shooter would take home a full case of beer.

After two years, Coffey sold the club. The new ownership group lacked knowledge of the business of minor league sports, and the travel to places as distant as San Antonio, Texas, became increasingly more expensive. Additionally, the honeymoon between the local residents and the new sport and its arena was over.

The brightest moment of the Force’s last two seasons occurred on January 25, 2000, when the Coliseum hosted the CHL All-Star Game. Despite the fact that eight inches of snow had fallen during the day, 6,128 people showed to watch the game.

In the spring of 2001, it was announced that the CHL would consolidate with the Western Professional Hockey League. With the departures of teams in Columbus, Huntsville and Macon, the Force became isolated and it was determined to be financially impossible to continue in the CHL, so they folded.

There would be no more professional hockey in Fayetteville until the 2002–03 season, when the ACHL and the Cape Fear FireAntz would come to town.
