= 2000–01 IIHF Continental Cup =

The Continental Cup 2000–01 was the fourth edition of the IIHF Continental Cup. The season started on September 22, 2000, and finished on January 14, 2001.

The tournament was won by ZSC Lions, who won the final group.

== Preliminary round ==
=== Group A ===
(Sofia, Bulgaria)

Team #1	Score	Team #2
HC Slavia Sofia (Bulgaria)	8:2	(Turkey) Ankara Büyükşehir
Sokil Kyiv (Ukraine)	15:1	(Federal Republic of Yugoslavia) HK Vojvodina
HC Slavia Sofia (Bulgaria)	4:5	(Federal Republic of Yugoslavia) HK Vojvodina
Sokil Kyiv (Ukraine)	22:1	(Turkey) Ankara Büyükşehir
HC Slavia Sofia (Bulgaria)	0:19	(Ukraine) Sokil Kyiv
HK Vojvodina (Federal Republic of Yugoslavia)	8:3	(Turkey) Ankara Büyükşehir

=== Group A standings ===
Rank	Team	Points
1	(Ukraine) Sokil Kyiv	6
2	(Federal Republic of Yugoslavia) HK Vojvodina	4
3	(Bulgaria) HC Slavia Sofia	2
4	(Turkey) Ankara Büyükşehir	0

=== Group B ===
(Belgrade, FR Yugoslavia)

Team #1	Score	Team #2
KHK Crvena Zvezda (Federal Republic of Yugoslavia)	13:1	(Turkey) İstanbul Paten SK
HC Levski Sofia (Bulgaria)	7:2	(Israel) HC Ma'alot
KHK Crvena Zvezda (Federal Republic of Yugoslavia)	6:0	(Bulgaria) HC Levski Sofia
HC Ma'alot (Israel)	11:4	(Turkey) İstanbul Paten SK
KHK Crvena Zvezda (Federal Republic of Yugoslavia)	15:3	(Israel) HC Ma'alot
HC Levski Sofia (Bulgaria)	7:0	(Turkey) İstanbul Paten SK

=== Group B standings ===
Rank	Team	Points
1	(Federal Republic of Yugoslavia) KHK Crvena Zvezda	6
2	(Bulgaria) HC Levski Sofia	4
3	(Israel) HC Ma'alot	2
4	(Turkey) İstanbul Paten SK	0

=== Group C ===
(Miercurea Ciuc, Romania)

Team #1	Score	Team #2
Ferencvárosi TC (Hungary)	5:2	(Spain) CH Jaca
SC Miercurea Ciuc (Romania)	1:8	(Kazakhstan) Kazzinc-Torpedo
SC Miercurea Ciuc (Romania)	3:1	(Spain) CH Jaca
Kazzinc-Torpedo (Kazakhstan)	9:0	(Hungary) Ferencvárosi TC
Kazzinc-Torpedo (Kazakhstan)	14:0	(Spain) CH Jaca
SC Miercurea Ciuc (Romania)	4:5	(Hungary) Ferencvárosi TC

=== Group C standings ===
Rank	Team	Points
1	(Kazakhstan) Kazzinc-Torpedo	6
2	(Hungary) Ferencvárosi TC	4
3	(Romania) SC Miercurea Ciuc	2
4	(Spain) CH Jaca	0

=== Group D ===
(Volán, Hungary)

Team #1	Score	Team #2
HK Slavija Ljubljana (Slovenia)	9:3	(Romania) HC Rapid București
Alba Volán Székesfehérvár (Hungary)	4:1	(Poland) Podhale Nowy Targ
Alba Volán Székesfehérvár (Hungary)	8:2	(Slovenia) HK Slavija Ljubljana
Podhale Nowy Targ (Poland)	5:3	(Romania) HC Rapid București
HK Slavija Ljubljana (Slovenia)	3:0	(Poland) Podhale Nowy Targ
Alba Volán Székesfehérvár (Hungary)	12:0	(Romania) HC Rapid București

=== Group D standings ===
Rank	Team	Points
1	(Hungary) Alba Volán Székesfehérvár	6
2	(Slovenia) HK Slavija Ljubljana	4
3	(Poland) Podhale Nowy Targ	2
4	(Romania) HC Rapid București	0

=== Group E ===
(Caen, France)

Team #1	Score	Team #2
HC Caen (France)	7:2	(Netherlands) Nijmegen Tigers
Herning Blue Fox (Denmark)	17:0	(Spain) CHH Txuri Urdin
HC Caen (France)	20:3	(Spain) CHH Txuri Urdin
Herning Blue Fox (Denmark)	13:1	(Netherlands) Nijmegen Tigers
HC Caen (France)	2:6	(Denmark) Herning Blue Fox
Nijmegen Tigers (Netherlands)	11:1	(Spain) CHH Txuri Urdin

=== Group E standings ===
Rank	Team	Points
1	(Denmark) Herning Blue Fox	6
2	(France) HC Caen	4
3	(Netherlands) Nijmegen Tigers	2
4	(Spain) CHH Txuri Urdin	0

== First Group Stage ==
=== Group F ===
(Milan, Italy)

Team #1	Score	Team #2
HC Lugano (Switzerland)	3:0	(Ukraine) Sokil Kyiv
HC Milano Vipers (Italy)	3:2	(Austria) EC Villacher SV
HC Milano Vipers (Italy)	1:3	(Switzerland) HC Lugano
Sokil Kyiv (Ukraine)	7:3	(Austria) EC Villacher SV
HC Milano Vipers (Italy)	2:2	(Ukraine) Sokil Kyiv
HC Lugano (Switzerland)	4:1	(Austria) EC Villacher SV

=== Group F standings ===
Rank	Team	Points
1	(Switzerland) HC Lugano	6
2	(Ukraine) Sokil Kyiv	3
3	(Italy) HC Milano Vipers	3
4	(Austria) EC Villacher SV	0

=== Group G ===
(Ljubljana, Slovenia)

Team #1	Score	Team #2
HDD Olimpija Ljubljana (Slovenia)	0:8	(Ukraine) HC Berkut-Kyiv
EC KAC (Austria)	6:0	(Federal Republic of Yugoslavia) KHK Crvena Zvezda
HDD Olimpija Ljubljana (Slovenia)	7:3	(Federal Republic of Yugoslavia) KHK Crvena Zvezda
HC Berkut-Kyiv (Ukraine)	3:0	(Austria) EC KAC
HDD Olimpija Ljubljana (Slovenia)	0:3	(Austria) EC KAC
HC Berkut-Kyiv (Ukraine)	10:3	(Federal Republic of Yugoslavia) KHK Crvena Zvezda

=== Group G standings ===
Rank	Team	Points
1	(Ukraine) HC Berkut-Kyiv	6
2	(Austria) EC KAC	4
3	(Slovenia) HDD Olimpija Ljubljana	2
4	(Federal Republic of Yugoslavia) KHK Crvena Zvezda	0

=== Group H ===
(Dunaújváros, Hungary)

Team #1	Score	Team #2
HKm Zvolen (Slovakia)	5:1	(Croatia) KHL Medveščak Zagreb
Dunaferr SE (Hungary)	5:2	(Kazakhstan) Kazzinc-Torpedo
Dunaferr SE (Hungary)	2:2	(Croatia) KHL Medveščak Zagreb
HKm Zvolen (Slovakia)	3:1	(Kazakhstan) Kazzinc-Torpedo
Kazzinc-Torpedo (Kazakhstan)	11:3	(Croatia) KHL Medveščak Zagreb
Dunaferr SE (Hungary)	2:5	(Slovakia) HKm Zvolen

=== Group H standings ===
Rank	Team	Points
1	(Slovakia) HKm Zvolen	6
2	(Hungary) Dunaferr SE	3
3	(Kazakhstan) Kazzinc-Torpedo	2
4	(Croatia) KHL Medveščak Zagreb	1

=== Group J ===
(Oświęcim, Poland)

Team #1	Score	Team #2
IHC Písek (Czech Republic)	8:0	(Slovenia) HK Acroni Jesenice
Dwory Unia Oświęcim (Poland)	5:0	(Hungary) Alba Volán Székesfehérvár
IHC Písek (Czech Republic)	3:3	(Hungary) Alba Volán Székesfehérvár
Dwory Unia Oświęcim (Poland)	4:1	(Slovenia) HK Acroni Jesenice
HK Acroni Jesenice (Slovenia)	10:4	(Hungary) Alba Volán Székesfehérvár
Dwory Unia Oświęcim (Poland)	6:1	(Czech Republic) IHC Písek

=== Group J standings ===
Rank	Team	Points
1	(Poland) Dwory Unia Oświęcim	6
2	(Czech Republic) IHC Písek	3
3	(Slovenia) HK Acroni Jesenice	2
4	(Hungary) Alba Volán Székesfehérvár	1

=== Group K ===
(Liepājas, Latvia)

Team #1	Score	Team #2
Keramin Minsk (Belarus)	12:5	(Lithuania) SC Energija
HK Liepājas Metalurgs (Latvia)	4:7	(Latvia) HK Riga 2000
HK Riga 2000 (Latvia)	1:6	(Belarus) Keramin Minsk
HK Liepājas Metalurgs (Latvia)	5:3	(Lithuania) SC Energija
HK Riga 2000 (Latvia)	4:6	(Lithuania) SC Energija
HK Liepājas Metalurgs (Latvia)	2:2	(Belarus) Keramin Minsk

=== Group K standings ===
Rank	Team	Points
1	(Belarus) Keramin Minsk	5
2	(Latvia) HK Liepājas Metalurgs	3
3	(Latvia) HK Riga 2000	2
4	(Lithuania) SC Energija	2

=== Group L ===
(Frederikshavn, Denmark)

Team #1	Score	Team #2
Herning Blue Fox (Denmark)	5:7	(Norway) Vålerenga
Frederikshavn White Hawks (Denmark)	3:3	(France) HC Reims
Frederikshavn White Hawks (Denmark)	4:3	(Denmark) Herning Blue Fox
Vålerenga (Norway)	3:3	(France) HC Reims
Frederikshavn White Hawks (Denmark)	1:4	(Norway) Vålerenga
Herning Blue Fox (Denmark)	*	(France) HC Reims

*: Match was suspended and never played

=== Group L standings ===
Rank	Team	Points
1	(Norway) Vålerenga	6
2	(Denmark) Frederikshavn White Hawks	3
3	(France) HC Reims	2
4	(Denmark) Herning Blue Fox	0

(Switzerland) HC Ambrì-Piotta, (Germany) München Barons, (Czech Republic) HC Oceláři Třinec, (Slovakia) HC Slovan Bratislava, (Norway) Storhamar Dragons, (United Kingdom) London Knights : bye

== Second Group Stage ==
=== Group M ===
(Ambrì, Switzerland)

Team #1	Score	Team #2
HC Lugano (Switzerland)	1:1	(Germany) München Barons
HC Ambrì-Piotta (Switzerland)	4:2	(Ukraine) HC Berkut-Kyiv
München Barons (Germany)	5:4	(Ukraine) HC Berkut-Kyiv
HC Ambrì-Piotta (Switzerland)	2:2	(Switzerland) HC Lugano
HC Lugano (Switzerland)	7:4	(Ukraine) HC Berkut-Kyiv
HC Ambrì-Piotta (Switzerland)	1:3	(Germany) München Barons

=== Group M standings ===
Rank	Team	Points
1	(Germany) München Barons	5
2	(Switzerland) HC Lugano	4
3	(Switzerland) HC Ambrì-Piotta	3
4	(Ukraine) HC Berkut-Kyiv	0

=== Group N ===
(Bratislava, Slovakia)

Team #1	Score	Team #2
HC Oceláři Třinec (Czech Republic)	7:3	(Poland) Dwory Unia Oświęcim
HC Slovan Bratislava (Slovakia)	0:3	(Slovakia) HKm Zvolen
HKm Zvolen (Slovakia)	4:6	(Czech Republic) HC Oceláři Třinec
HC Slovan Bratislava (Slovakia)	7:2	(Poland) Dwory Unia Oświęcim
HKm Zvolen (Slovakia)	5:5	(Poland) Dwory Unia Oświęcim
HC Slovan Bratislava (Slovakia)	5:2	(Czech Republic) HC Oceláři Třinec

=== Group N standings ===
Rank	Team	Points	
1	(Slovakia) HC Slovan Bratislava	4	(GF:5;GA:2)
2	(Czech Republic) HC Oceláři Třinec	4	(GF:2;GA:5)
3	(Slovakia) HKm Zvolen	3	
4	(Poland) Dwory Unia Oświęcim	1	

=== Group O ===
(Hamar, Norway)

Team #1	Score	Team #2
Vålerenga (Norway)	1:1	(United Kingdom) London Knights
Storhamar Dragons (Norway)	5:2	(Belarus) Keramin Minsk
London Knights (United Kingdom)	5:0	(Belarus) Keramin Minsk
Storhamar Dragons (Norway)	5:7	(Norway) Vålerenga
Vålerenga (Norway)	9:3	(Belarus) Keramin Minsk
Storhamar Dragons (Norway)	1:9	(United Kingdom) London Knights

=== Group O standings ===
Rank	Team	Points	DIF
1	(United Kingdom) London Knights	5	+13
2	(Norway) Vålerenga	5	+8
3	(Norway) Storhamar Dragons	2	
4	(Belarus) Keramin Minsk	0	

(Switzerland) ZSC Lions : bye

== Final Group Stage ==
(Zürich, Switzerland)

Team #1	Score	Team #2
HC Slovan Bratislava (Slovakia)	2:2	(Germany) München Barons
ZSC Lions (Switzerland)	1:0	(United Kingdom) London Knights
ZSC Lions (Switzerland)	4:1	(Germany) München Barons
London Knights (United Kingdom)	5:2	(Slovakia) HC Slovan Bratislava
London Knights (United Kingdom)	4:1	(Germany) München Barons
ZSC Lions (Switzerland)	1:5	(Slovakia) HC Slovan Bratislava

=== Final Group standings ===
Rank	Team	Points	
1	(Switzerland) ZSC Lions	4	(GF:1;GA:0)
2	(United Kingdom) London Knights	4	(GF:1;GA:0)
3	(Slovakia) HC Slovan Bratislava	3	
4	(Germany) München Barons	1	
