= Munich Barons =

- City: Munich
- League: German Ice Hockey League
- Founded: 1999
- Folded: 2002
- Home arena: Olympia-Eisstadion
- Owner: Anschutz Entertainment Group

Franchise history
- 2002–2016: Hamburg Freezers

The Munich Barons were a professional ice hockey team between 1999 and 2002 run by the Anschutz Entertainment Group (AEG) in the German Ice Hockey League (German: Deutsche Eishockey Liga - DEL). The best year the team had was in 2000 when they won the German championship.

After long negotiations among the Anschutz Group, the ice hockey teams Landshut Cannibals, ESC Munich and the Olympiapark Munich GmbH, the creation of the Munich Ice Hockey Club GmbH was announced on the 1 June 1999. The license for the DEL was carried over from the debt-ridden Landshut Cannibals. The team played its home games in the Olympia-Eisstadion. The name and logo of the Barons were unveiled in the middle of June of that year.

Despite a poor start, the Munich Barons team – whose players were brought together from several other teams – was able to come together and finished in second place in their first season in the DEL. In the play-offs, the team became German champions. In spite of that success, the number of spectators at game was lower than expected (regular season: 2,800; playoffs: 4,900). In the 2000–2001 season, the Barons finished in third place in the regular season. In the playoffs, they reached the finals, but lost a hard-fought battle against the eventual champions, the Adler Mannheim. Despite the continued good showing of the team, the number of spectators remained low. Because of the expensive player contracts and the lack of sponsors, the Barons accumulated substantial debts. In the 2001–2002 season, the Barons placed first in the regular season, in spite of injuries plaguing the team. In the play-off semifinal, the Barons lost to the eventual champions, Kölner Haie.

Although by this time the number of spectators had begun to increase slightly, the Anschutz Group decided to move the team to Hamburg for financial reasons on 3 June 2002. From then, the Barons played as the Hamburg Freezers in Hamburg in the DEL until 2016, when the Anschutz Group ceased operations due to financial reasons.

== Standings ==
Season	Plays	Gates	Points	Place on the table	Play-Offs
DEL 1999/2000	56	208:155	109	2.	German champion
DEL 2000/01	60	175:150	104	3.	Finale
DEL 2001/02	60	182:138	121	1.	Semi-final
