= 2009–10 Missouri Mavericks season =

Missourian Hockey season

2009–10 Missouri Mavericks
- Conference: Northern 5th
- 2009–10 record: 31-27-6
- Home record: 18-11-3
- Road record: 13-16-3
- Goals for: 200
- Goals against: 220

Team information
- General manager: Brent Thiessen
- Coach: Scott Hillman
- Assistant coach: Jeff Christian
- Captain: Tyler Fleck, Carlyle Lewis
- Alternate captains: Jeff Christian, Brett Hammond, Chad Hinz
- Arena: Independence Events Center
- Average attendance: 4,935

Team leaders
- Goals: Jeff Christian (29)
- Assists: Jeff Christian (49)
- Points: Jeff Christian (78)
- Penalty minutes: Carlyle Lewis (252)
- Plus/minus: Chad Hinz, Nick Sirota (Tied +5)
- Wins: Charlie Effinger (9)
- Goals against average: Charlie Effinger (2.68)

The 2009–10 Missouri Mavericks season is the inaugural season of the Central Hockey League (CHL) franchise in Independence, Missouri, a suburb of Kansas City, Missouri.

== Off-season ==
In April 2009, Matt Adams, Mark Adams, and Mike Carper, the owners of the group Independence Pro Hockey, LLC, announced that their group would bring a Central Hockey League team to Independence, Missouri to begin play in the 2009–10 season. Independence Pro Hockey, LLC previously owned the Lubbock Cotton Kings, also of the Central Hockey League. The team would play at the Independence Events Center as part of a 10-year lease agreement.

Brad Lund, previously the President and Chief Executive Officer of the Oklahoma City Blazers from 1992 to 2008, was tapped to serve as President of Independence Pro Hockey, LLC and run the day-to-day operations of the team. Brent Thiessen was to be the team's General Manager and Joe Greene was hired to be the team's Assistant General Manager.

On June 2, 2009, Scott Hillman, a former player in the Central Hockey League and previously the cead coach of the Knoxville Ice Bears of the Southern Professional Hockey League, winning both back-to-back regular season titles and league championships for both the 2007–08 season and 2008–09 season, was named as the team's new head coach. Hillman also won the Coach of The Year award for the SPHL for the 2008–09 season.

On June 25, 2009, it was announced that the team would be called the Missouri Mavericks.

== Regular season ==
=== Conference standings ===
Northern Conference	GP	W	L	OTL	Pts	GF	GA
y-Rapid City Rush	64	43	14	7	93	253	197
x-Colorado Eagles	64	42	15	7	91	277	208
x-Bossier-Shreveport Mudbugs	64	38	22	4	80	213	180
x-Mississippi RiverKings	64	33	24	7	73	217	116
x-Missouri Mavericks	64	31	27	6	68	200	220
e-Tulsa Oilers	64	28	29	7	63	203	230
e-Wichita Thunder	64	9	50	5	23	128	257

Note: GP = Games played; W = Wins; L = Losses; OTL = Overtime loss; Pts = Points; GF = Goals for; GA = Goals against

y – clinched conference title; x – clinched playoff spot; e – eliminated from playoff contention

== Playoffs ==
On April 2, 2010, the Mavericks' inaugural 2009–10 season ended with a 7–6 loss to the Rapid City Rush in Game 4 of the Ray Miron President's Cup Playoffs Northern Conference Semifinals.

2010 Central Hockey League Ray Miron President's Cup Playoffs

Ray Miron President's Cup Playoffs Opening Round vs. Mississippi RiverKings (Best-of-Three Series) (Home: 1-0; Road: 1-1)
#	Date	Opponent	Score	OT	Decision	Series
1	March 22	Mississippi RiverKings	4-2		Effinger	1-0
2	March 24	@ Mississippi RiverKings	2-1		McNulty	1-1
3	March 25	@ Mississippi RiverKings	3-1		Effinger	2-1

Ray Miron President's Cup Playoffs Northern Conference Semi-Finals vs. Rapid City Rush (Best-of-Seven Series) (Home: 0-2; Road: 0-2)
#	Date	Opponent	Score	OT	Decision	Series
1	March 27	Rapid City Rush	5-1		Battochio	0-1
2	March 28	Rapid City Rush	2-1		Battochio	0-2
3	March 31	@ Rapid City Rush	4-1		Battochio	0-3
4	April 2	@ Rapid City Rush	7-6	OT	Battochio	0-4

== Awards, records, and milestones ==
=== Awards and records ===
Player	Award/Record
Missouri Mavericks	Central Hockey League 2009-10 Season "Best of The Best" Poll: 2nd Place: Best Arena Music; 3rd Place; Best Fans; On-Ice Promotions
Jeff Christian	Central Hockey League 2009-10 Season "Best of The Best" Poll: 3rd Place: Best Playmaker; Smartest Player
Charlie Effinger	Oakley Central Hockey League Goaltender of The Week (week ending Sunday, February 28, 2010). In 4 games, he had a 4–0 record with a 2.26 GAA and a Save Percentage of 0.910.
Steve Garrett	Central Hockey League 2009-10 Season "Best of The Best" Poll: 3rd Place: Best Public-Address Announcer
Carlyle Lewis	Central Hockey League 2009-10 Season "Best of The Best" Poll: 2nd Place: Best Fighter (Heavyweight)
Karl Sellan	Central Hockey League 2009-10 Season "Best of The Best" Poll: 1st Place: Most Annoying Player
Nick Sirota	Central Hockey League 2009-10 Season "Best of The Best" Poll: 3rd Place: Best rookie; Central Hockey League All-Rookie Team (2009-10 Season)

== Transactions ==
Player Signings/Acquisitions off Waivers/Activated from League Suspension

Player	Former team	Date
Jeff Christian	Rockford IceHogs	July 1, 2009
Tyler Fleck	Oklahoma City Blazers	July 15, 2009
Shaun Arvai	SV Kaltern/Caldaro Eishockey	July 15, 2009
Travis Kauffeldt	Huntsville Havoc	July 15, 2009
Mike Gorman	Amarillo Gorillas	July 20, 2009
Doug Groenestege	Oklahoma City Blazers	July 20, 2009
Carlyle Lewis	Coventry Blaze	July 27, 2009
Doug MacIver	Cardiff Devils	July 27, 2009
Travis Martell	Knoxville Ice Bears	July 27, 2009
Bill Vandermeer	Oklahoma City Blazers	August 13, 2009
Ted Vandermeer	Oklahoma City Blazers	August 19, 2009
Chad Hinz	Oklahoma City Blazers	September 3, 2009
Simon Watson	Rocky Mountain Rage	September 14, 2009
Jason Murfitt	Oklahoma City Blazers	September 14, 2009
Kyle Bochek	Saginaw Spirit	September 18, 2009
Nick Vergeer	Wilfrid Laurier University	September 18, 2009
Sam Bowles	Columbus Cottonmouths	September 24, 2009
Shane Jury	Neepawa Natives	September 24, 2009
Derek Pallardy	Knoxville Ice Bears	September 29, 2009
Derek Buors	Winnipeg Saints	September 29, 2009
Jared Lavender	Castleton State College	September 30, 2009
Sean Perkins	Cincinnati Cyclones	September 30, 2009
Mark Van Vliet	Knoxville Ice Bears	September 30, 2009
Robb Ross	United States Military Academy	October 1, 2009
Erik Peterson	Alpena IceDiggers	October 1, 2009
Karey Pieper	Edmonton Oil Kings	October 1, 2009
Nick Sirota	Idaho Steelheads	October 20, 2009
Brett Hammond	Arizona Sundogs	October 30, 2009
Blake Cosgrove	Northern Michigan University	October 30, 2009
Nathan Schwartzbauer	Dayton Bombers	November 5, 2009
Jeff MacDermid	Bossier-Shreveport Mudbugs	November 9, 2009
Mike Burgoyne	Victoria Salmon Kings	November 25, 2009
Alexandre Vincent	Odessa Jackalopes	November 25, 2009
Tommy Lange	Kalamazoo Wings	December 22, 2009
Tyler Kindle	Newcastle Vipers	January 8, 2010
Braden Walls	Texas Brahmas	January 8, 2010
Gerry Festa	The University of British Columbia	January 14, 2010
Jordan Foreman	Idaho Steelheads	January 14, 2010
Rob Smith	Victoria Salmon Kings	January 21, 2010
Todd Paul	Texas Brahmas	February 4, 2010
Toby Lafrance	Thetford Mines Isothermic	February 6, 2010
Blake Forsyth	Odense Bulldogs	March 6, 2010
Mike McGurk	Owen Sound Attack	
Chris Mifflen	Carleton University	

Waived/Retired/Placements on Team Suspension

Player	Free Agency Loss (New Team)/Waived (New Team)/Placed on Team Suspension (New Team)/Retired	Date
Travis Kauffeldt	Waived (Huntsville Havoc)	October 13, 2009
Travis Martell	Waived (Knoxville Ice Bears)	October 13, 2009
Jason Murfitt	Waived	October 13, 2009
Nick Vergeer	Waived (Tillsonburg Thunder)	October 13, 2009
Shane Jury	Waived (Knoxville Ice Bears)	October 13, 2009
Derek Buors	Waived (Knoxville Ice Bears)	October 13, 2009
Robb Ross	Waived (Bulldogs Liège)	October 13, 2009
Erik Peterson	Waived	October 13, 2009
Doug MacIver	Waived (Peterborough Phantoms)	October 21, 2009
Ted Vandermeer	Waived (Bentley Generals)	October 29, 2009
Mark Van Vliet	Waived (Knoxville Ice Bears)	October 30, 2009
Sam Bowles	Waived (Columbus Cottonmouths)	November 5, 2009
Nathan Schwartzbauer	Waived (Mississippi RiverKings)	November 9, 2009
Blake Cosgrove	Waived (Frisk Asker)	November 10, 2009
Karey Pieper	Waived (Bentley Generals)	November 22, 2009
Shaun Arvai	Waived (Amarillo Gorillas)	November 25, 2009
Rob Smith	Waived (Las Vegas Wranglers)	January 22, 2014
Tyler Kindle	Waived (Quad City Mallards)	February 6, 2010
Alexandre Vincent	Waived (Amarillo Gorillas)	February 8, 2010
Kyle Bochek	Placed on Team Suspension (Knoxville Ice Bears)	March 6, 2010
Mike Gorman	Waived	March 12, 2010
Mike Harr	Waived	March 21, 2010

Trades

September 11, 2009	To Wichita Thunder: Rights to Jeff MacDermid for 2010-11 season	To Missouri: Andrew Davis
October 20, 2009	To Arizona: Doug Groenestege	To Missouri: Karl Sellan
December 16, 2009	To Tulsa Oilers: Tyler Fleck	To Missouri: Tom Maldonado, rights to Jim Henkemeyer for 2010-11 season
December 22, 2009	To Allen Americans: Sean Perkins	To Missouri: Charlie Effinger
January 17, 2010	To Arizona Sundogs: Chad Hinz	To Missouri: Rights of Matt Hanson and Andrew Winnik for 2010-11 season
February 4, 2010	To Rio Grande Valley Killer Bees: Andrew Davis	To Missouri: Mike Harr

== Roster ==
2009-10 Missouri Mavericks
Goaltenders: (United States) 31 – Charlie Effinger; (Canada) 31 – Alexandre Vincent; (Canada) 34 – Gerry Festa; (Canada) 40 – Mike Gorman; (Canada) 49 – Doug Groenestege	Defensemen: (Canada) - – Derek Buors; (Canada) - – Travis Kauffeldt; (Canada) - – Travis Martell; (Canada) 2 – Mark Van Vliet; (Canada) 3 – Todd Paul; (Canada) 4 – Blake Cosgrove; (Canada) 4 – Mike McGurk; (United States) 6 – Jared Lavender; (United States) 7 – Sean Perkins; (Canada) 8 – Chris Mifflen; (Canada) 10 – Jordan Foreman; (Canada) 13 – Blake Forsyth; (Canada) 14 – Tyler Fleck - C; (Canada) 14 – Doug MacIver; (United States) 19 – Tyler Kindle; (Canada) 22 – Mike Burgoyne; (Canada) 25 – Shaun Arvai; (United States) 25 – Tom Maldonado; (Canada) 27 – Andrew Davis; (United States) 27 – Mike Harr; (Canada) 28 – Karl Sellan; (United States) 29 – Nathan Schwartzbauer	Forward: (Canada) - – Shane Jury; (Canada) - – Jason Murfitt; (United States) - – Erik Peterson; (United States) - – Robb Ross; (Canada) - – Nick Vergeer; (Canada) 7 – Braden Walls; (Canada) 8 – Kyle Bochek; (Canada) 9 – Chad Hinz - A; (Canada) 9 – Toby Lafrance; (Canada) 12 – Jeff MacDermid; (Canada) 14 – Rob Smith; (United States) 15 – Nick Sirota; (Canada) 16 – Bill Vandermeer; (United States) 17 – Brett Hammond; (Canada) 18 – Simon Watson; (Canada) 19 – Ted Vandermeer; (United States) 20 – Derek Pallardy; (Canada) 24 – Carlyle Lewis - C; (Canada) 29 – Sam Bowles; (Canada) 37 – Karey Pieper; (United States) 37 – Tommy Lange; (Canada) 72 – Jeff Christian - A	Coach: (Canada) Scott Hillman; President: (United States) Brent Thiessen

== See also ==
- 2012–13 CHL season
