= 2005–06 SPHL season =

- League: Southern Professional Hockey League
- Sport: Ice hockey
- Duration: October 21, 2005–April 12, 2006

Regular season
- Season champions: Knoxville Ice Bears
- Season MVP: Matt Carmichael (Huntsville)
- Top scorer: Kevin Swider (Knoxville)

Playoffs
- Finals champions: Knoxville Ice Bears
- Finals runners-up: Florida Seals

SPHL seasons
- ← 2004–05 2006–07 →

The 2005–06 Southern Professional Hockey League season was the second season of the Southern Professional Hockey League. The regular season began October 21, 2005, and ended April 12, 2006, after a 56-game regular season and a six-team playoff. The Knoxville Ice Bears won their first SPHL championship.

== Preseason ==
The Asheville Aces, Macon Trax, and Winston-Salem Polar Twins all folded following the 2004–05 season. Replacing them were the Florida Seals and Pee Dee Cyclones.

A new playoff structure was announced, with the top seed and sixth seed playing each other in a best-of-5-game series, with the winner advancing to the championship. The second and fifth, and third and fourth seeds each play a best-of-3-game series, with the winners meeting in another 3-game series to determine the second finalist.

== Teams ==
2005-06 Southern Professional Hockey League
Team	City	Arena
Columbus Cottonmouths	Columbus, Georgia	Columbus Civic Center
Fayetteville FireAntz	Fayetteville, North Carolina	Cumberland County Crown Coliseum
Florida Seals	Kissimmee, Florida	Silver Spurs Arena
Huntsville Havoc	Huntsville, Alabama	Von Braun Center
Jacksonville Barracudas	Jacksonville, Florida	Jacksonville Veterans Memorial Arena
Knoxville Ice Bears	Knoxville, Tennessee	Knoxville Civic Coliseum
Pee Dee Cyclones	Florence, South Carolina	Florence Civic Center

== Map of teams ==
SPHL teams

== Regular season ==
=== Final standings ===
Team	GP	W	L	OTL	GF	GA	Pts
Knoxville Ice Bears^{‡}	56	36	14	6	262	192	78
Columbus Cottonmouths	56	34	16	6	247	182	74
Florida Seals	56	32	17	7	211	174	71
Fayetteville FireAntz	56	31	19	6	224	175	68
Huntsville Havoc	56	32	21	3	203	186	67
Pee Dee Cyclones	56	16	33	7	201	307	39
Jacksonville Barracudas	56	15	39	2	183	315	32

^{‡} William B. Coffey Trophy winners
Advanced to playoffs

=== Attendance ===
Team	Total	Games	Average
Fayetteville	103,179	28	3,684
Knoxville	96,428	28	3,443
Columbus	90,518	28	3,232
Huntsville	87,871	28	3,183
Florida	57,538	28	2,054
Jacksonville	57,028	28	2,036
Pee Dee	40,626	28	1,450

== President's Cup playoffs ==
First round
1	Knoxville Ice Bears	4	7	3	6	x
6	Pee Dee Cyclones	5	1	1	3	x
3	Florida Seals	2	1	1
4	Fayetteville FireAntz	1	8	0
5	Huntsville Havoc	4	3	3
2	Columbus Cottonmouths	1	4	2

Second round
3	Florida Seals	4	5	x
5	Huntsville Havoc	2	3	x

Final
1	Knoxville Ice Bears	6	2	1	3	x
3	Florida Seals	3	1	3	2	x

=== (1) Knoxville Ice Bears vs. (6) Pee Dee Cyclones ===
The Knoxville Ice Bears and the Macon trax play at best of 5 round that will take the place of the first two playoff rounds. The other four teams will play a best of 3 game Quarter Final and Simi Final round.

Game-by-Game		Score		Knoxville goals	Pee Dee goals	Winning goalie
1	March 24	at Pee Dee 5, Knoxville 4	OT 3:50	Jason Bermingham 2, K.J. Voorhees, Robbie Rangus	Justin Siebold, Brett Roat 2, Geoff Rollins, Edan Welch	Kelly Shields
2	March 25	at Pee Dee 1, Knoxville 7		Kevin Swider 2, Robbie Rangus, Jason Bermingham, Curtis Menzul, Rob Miller, K.J. Voorhees	Steve Birch	James Ronayne
3	March 31	at Knoxville 3, Pee Dee 1		K.C. Caudill, Jason Bermingham, Kevin Swider	Joel Petkoff	James Ronayne
4	March 31	at Knoxville 6, Pee Dee 3		Jason Bermingham 5, Nathan Daly	Geoff Rollins, Justin Siebold 2	James Ronayne
Knoxville win series 3–1				Bermingham 9, Swider 3, Voorhees 2, Rangus 2	Siebold 3, Roat 2, Rollins 2	

=== Quarterfinals ===
Note: game-winning goal scorer indicated in italics

==== (2) Columbus Cottonmouths vs. (5) Huntsville Havoc ====
Game-by-Game		Score		Columbus goals	Huntsville goals	Winning goalie
1	March 23	at Columbus 1, Huntsville 4		Tim Green	Don Patrick, Mark Cole, Doug Merrell, Jesse Baraniuk	Matt Carmichael
2	March 25	at Huntsville 3, Columbus 4	2OT 7:32	Lorne Misita, Tom McMonagle, Mat Ponto,Ryan Haggarty	Jeff Dams, Chris Peach, Don Patrick	Chad Rycroft
3	March 28	at Columbus 2, Huntsville 3		Craig Stahl, Tom McMonagle	Ryan Brown, James Patterson, Mike O'Sullivan	Matt Carmichael
Huntsville win series 2–1				McMonagle 2	Patrick 2	

==== (3) Florida Seals vs. (4) Fayetteville FireAntz ====
Game-by-Game		Score	Florida goals	Fayetteville goals	Winning goalie
1	March 24	at Florida 2, Fayetteville 1	John Gurskis, Robert Sich	Kory Baker	Terry Denike
2	March 25	at Fayetteville 8, Florida 1	Justin Keller	Rob Meanchoff, George Nistas 4, Nick Kormanyos, Dean Jackson, Scott Corbett	Chad Collins
3	March 28	at Florida 1, Fayetteville 0	Robert Sich		Terry Denike
Florida win series 2–1			Sich 2		

=== Semifinals ===
Note: game-winning goal scorer indicated in italics

==== (3) Florida Seals vs. (5) Huntsville Havoc ====
Game-by-Game		Score	Florida goals	Huntsville goals	Winning goalie
1	March 31	at Florida 4, Huntsville 2	Steve Zoryk, Robert Sich 2, Nick Cammarata	Chris Peach, Jeff Dams	Terry Denike
2	April 2	at Huntsville 3, Florida 5	Craig Miller, Nick Cammarata, Justin Keller, John Gurskis 2	Luke Phillips, Jeff Dams, Jason DeGuehery	Terry Denike
Florida win series 2–0			Sich 2, Cammarata 2, Gurskis 2	Dams 2	

=== Finals ===
April 7, 2006; 7:35 pm	Florida	3–6	Knoxville	Knoxville Civic Coliseum, Knoxville, TN; Attendance: 2,312

Game reference

Terry Denike
Goalies
James Ronayne

	0 – 1	04:39 – Searle (Swider) (PP)
	0 – 2	14:27 – Forsberg (Kovalcik, Craigen)
	0 – 3	21:04 – Swider (Bermingham) (PP)
	0 – 4	32:16 – Miller (Craigen)
Miller (Zoryk) (PP) – 41:34	1 – 4
	1 – 5	44:45 – Daly (Menzul, Bermingham) (PP)
Peppler (Mnatsakanov, Zoryk) – 48:35	2 – 5
	2 – 6	51:11 – Bermingham, (Menzul, Swider) (PP)
Deeves (Zoryk, Snyder) (PP) – 57:45	3 – 6

48 min
Penalties
24 min
33
Shots
39

April 8, 2006; 7:35 pm	Florida	1–2	Knoxville	Knoxville Civic Coliseum, Knoxville, TN; Attendance: 2,688

Game reference

Terry Denike
Goalies
James Ronayne

Cammarata (Dawes) – 06:03	1 – 0
	1 – 1	07:25 – Craigen (Forsberg, Carriere)
	1 – 2	14:04 – Daly (Bermingham, Lewis)

16 min
Penalties
20 min
41
Shots
35

April 11, 2006; 7:35 pm	Knoxville	1–3	Florida	Silver Spurs Arena, Kissimmee, FL; Attendance: 2,766

Game reference

James Ronayne
Goalies
Terry Denike

	0 – 1	01:23 – Deeves (Hammer, Zoryk)
Forsberg (Kovalcik, Carriere) – 14:56	1 – 1
	1 – 2	47:31 – Keller (Snyder, Sich) (PP)
	1 – 3	59:59 – Miller (Hammer) (EN)

30 min
Penalties
14 min
35
Shots
33

April 12, 2006; 7:35 pm	Knoxville	3–2	Florida	Silver Spurs Arena, Kissimmee, FL; Attendance: 2,028

Game reference

James Ronayne
Goalies
Terry Denike
Referee:
Mike Hughes

Rangus (Swider) – 03:07	1 – 0
Menzul (Daly) – 14:48	2 – 0
Swider (Rangus, Menzul) – 19:38	3 – 0
	3 – 1	30:24 – Keller (Deeves) (SH)
	3 – 2	42:23 – Zoryk (Deeves)

10 min
Penalties
8 min
26
Shots
26

== Awards ==
The All-SPHL teams were announced March 21, 2006, followed by the MVP on March 22, Defenseman of the Year on March 23, Coach of the Year on March 24, Rookie of the Year on March 27, and Goalie of the Year on Match 28.

President's Cup:	Knoxville Ice Bears
Commissioner's Cup:	Knoxville Ice Bears
League MVP:	Matt Carmichael (Huntsville)
Rookie of the Year:	Rob Sich (Florida)
Defenseman of the Year:	Mike Clarke (Fayetteville)
Goalie of the Year:	Terry Denike (Florida)
Coach of the Year:	Jerome Bechard (Columbus)

=== All-Star selections ===
1st Team All-Stars

(Canada) F Tim Green (Columbus)
(Canada) F Tylor Keller (Columbus)
(United States) F Kevin Swider (Knoxville)
(Canada) D Ryan Aikia (Columbus)
(Canada) D Mike Clarke (Fayetteville)
(Canada) G Matt Carmichael (Huntsville)

2nd Team All-Stars

(Canada) F Jason Bermingham (Knoxville)
(Canada) F Dean Jackson (Fayetteville)
(Canada) F Edan Welch (Pee Dee)
(Canada) D Mat Ponto (Columbus)
(United States) D Doug Searle (Knoxville)
(Canada) G Terry Denike (Florida)
