= 2006–07 SPHL season =

- League: Southern Professional Hockey League
- Sport: Ice hockey
- Duration: October 27, 2006–April 18, 2007

Regular season
- Season champions: Columbus Cottonmouths
- Season MVP: Rob Sich (Fayetteville)
- Top scorer: Kevin Swider (Knoxville)

Playoffs
- Finals champions: Fayetteville FireAntz
- Finals runners-up: Jacksonville Barracudas
- Playoffs MVP: Chad Collins (Fayetteville)

SPHL seasons
- ← 2005–06 2007–08 →

The 2006–07 Southern Professional Hockey League season was the third season of the Southern Professional Hockey League. The regular season began October 27, 2006, and ended April 18, 2007, after a 56-game regular season and a six-team playoff. The Fayetteville FireAntz won their first SPHL championship.

== Preseason ==
The Richmond Renegades joined the league as an expansion franchise, succeeding the United Hockey League's Richmond RiverDogs.

== Teams ==
2006-07 Southern Professional Hockey League
Team	City	Arena
Columbus Cottonmouths	Columbus, Georgia	Columbus Civic Center
Fayetteville FireAntz	Fayetteville, North Carolina	Cumberland County Crown Coliseum
Florida Seals	Kissimmee, Florida	Silver Spurs Arena
Huntsville Havoc	Huntsville, Alabama	Von Braun Center
Jacksonville Barracudas	Jacksonville, Florida	Jacksonville Veterans Memorial Arena
Knoxville Ice Bears	Knoxville, Tennessee	Knoxville Civic Coliseum
Pee Dee Cyclones	Florence, South Carolina	Florence Civic Center
Richmond Renegades	Richmond, Virginia	Richmond Coliseum

== Map of teams ==
SPHL teams

== Regular season ==
=== Final standings ===
Team	GP	W	L	OTL	GF	GA	Pts
Columbus Cottonmouths^{‡}	56	36	18	2	217	181	74
Knoxville Ice Bears	56	33	19	4	219	185	70
Fayetteville FireAntz	56	32	18	6	246	205	70
Huntsville Havoc	56	29	23	4	221	210	62
Richmond Renegades	56	27	25	4	187	219	58
Jacksonville Barracudas	56	25	24	7	198	238	57
Pee Dee Cyclones	56	16	32	8	225	280	40
Florida Seals*	26	11	14	1	110	105	23

^{‡} William B. Coffey Trophy winners
Advanced to playoffs

The Florida Seals folded mid-season after not meeting contractual obligations to their arena. A one-round dispersal draft was held January 5, with each team choosing one player from the Seals' roster. The picks were as follows: Pee Dee - Justin Keller, Jacksonville - Lawne Snyder, Fayetteville - Rob Sich, Richmond - Matt Balser, Columbus - Chad Haacke, Knoxville - Craig Geerlinks, Huntsville - Craig Miller.

=== Attendance ===
Team	Total	Games	Average
Huntsville	109,615	28	3,914
Richmond	95,756	28	3,419
Fayetteville	93,301	28	3,332
Columbus	92,534	28	3,304
Knoxville	90,640	28	3,237
Jacksonville	70,773	26	2,722
Florida	34,470	17	2,027
Pee Dee	36,928	26	1,420

== President's Cup playoffs ==
First round
1	Columbus Cottonmouths	1	3	4	3	x
6	Jacksonville Barracudas	2	4	2	4	x
3	Fayetteville FireAntz	3	5	x
4	Huntsville Havoc	2	4	x
5	Richmond Renegades	4	2	2
2	Knoxville Ice Bears	3	8	6

Second round
3	Fayetteville FireAntz	4	5	x
2	Knoxville Ice Bears	1	2	x

Final
6	Jacksonville Barracudas	1	5	3	3	x
3	Fayetteville FireAntz	3	6	2	5	x

=== (1) Columbus Cottonmouths vs. (6) Jacksonville Barracudas ===
The Columbus Cottonmouths and the Jacksonville Barracudas play at best of 5 round that will take the place of the first two playoff rounds. The other four teams will play a best of 3 game Quarter-final and Semi-final round.

Game-by-Game		Score		Columbus goals	Jacksonville goals	Winning goalie
1	March 29	at Columbus 1, Jacksonville 2	2OT 5:06	Mark Prentice	Steve Zoryk, Greg LeColst	Ryan Person
2	March 30	at Columbus 3, Jacksonville 4	OT 1:15	Ryan Haggarty, Mark Prentice, Daryl Moor	Steve Zoryk 2, Tyrone Garner 2	Ryan Person
3	April 1	at Jacksonville 2, Columbus 4		Galloway Carroll 3, Ryan Rutz	Tyrone Garner, Jim Murphy	Chad Rycroft
4	April 3	at Jacksonville 4, Columbus 3		Craig Stahl 2, Jason Price	Steve Zoryk, Jim Murphy, Tyrone Garner 2	Ryan Person
Jacksonville win series 3-1				Prentice 2	Zoryk 4, Garner 4, Murphy 2	

=== Quarter-finals ===
Note: game-winning goal scorer indicated in italics

==== (2) Knoxville Ice Bears vs. (5) Richmond Renegades ====
Game-by-Game		Score		Knoxville goals	Richmond goals	Winning goalie
1	March 30	at Knoxville 3, Richmond 4	2OT 4:17	Rob Flynn, Tim Vitek, Matt Kohansky	Dean Jackson, Tyler Schremp, Danny White, Donald Melnyk	Doug Groenestege
2	March 31	at Richmond 2, Knoxville 8		Mike Tuomi 3, Matt Kohansky, Robbie Rangus, Curtis Menzul, Nick Fouts, Mike Craigen	JJ Wrobel, Joe Pace	Terry Dunbar
3	April 3	at Knoxville 6, Richmond 2		Curtis Menzul, Robbie Rangus 2, David Segal, Doug Searle, Mike Tuomi	Tyler Schremp, Brian Goudie	Terry Dunbar
Knoxville win series 2-1				Tuomi 4, Rangus 3, Kohansky 2	Schremp 2	

==== (3) Fayetteville FireAntz vs. (4) Huntsville Havoc ====
Game-by-Game		Score		Fayetteville goals	Huntsville goals	Winning goalie
1	March 30	at Fayetteville 3, Huntsville 2		Jarrett Robertson, Robert Sich 2	Bill Monkman, Tristan Senior	Chad Collins
2	March 31	at Huntsville 4, Fayetteville 5	OT 5:41	Tim Velemirovich 2, Mike Clarke 2, Jarrett Robertson	Bill Monkman, Dan Buccella 2, Craig Bushey	Chad Collins
Fayetteville win series 2-0				Robertson 2, Sich 2, Velemirovich 2, Clarke 2	Monkman 2, Buccella 2	

=== Semi-finals ===
Note: game-winning goal scorer indicated in italics

==== (2) Knoxville Ice Bears vs. (3) Fayetteville FireAntz ====
Game-by-Game		Score	Knoxville goals	Fayetteville goals	Winning goalie
1	April 6	at Knoxville 1, Fayetteville 4	Mike Tuomi	Tim Velemirovich, Josh Welter, BJ Stephens, Jarrett Robertson	Chad Collins
2	April 7	at Fayetteville 5, Knoxville 2	Kevin Swider, Matt Kohansky	Tim Velemirovich, Marc Norrington, Josh Tataryn, Robert Sich, Bryan Dobek	Chad Collins
Fayetteville win series 2-0				Velemirovich 2	

=== Finals ===
April 13, 2007; 7:35 pm	Jacksonville	1 – 3	Fayetteville	Crown Coliseum, Fayetteville, NC; Attendance: 3,209

Game reference

Ryan Person
Goalies
Chad Collins
Referee:
Zac Wiebe

	0 – 1	12:47 - Stephens (Tataryn, Saittakari)
	0 – 2	34:12 - Stephens (Dobek, Tataryn) (PP)
	0 – 3	43:36 - Welter (Velemirovich, Sich)
Zoryk (Thomas, LeColst) (PP) - 51:07	1 – 3

22 min
Penalties
16 min
27
Shots
36

April 15, 2007; 4:00 pm	Jacksonville	5 – 6	Fayetteville	Crown Coliseum, Fayetteville, NC; Attendance: 3,209

Game reference

Ryan Person
Goalies
Chad Collins
Referee:
Adam Fish

	0 – 1	00:40 - Dobek (Welter, Sich)
	0 – 2	02:33 - Clarke (Sich, Welter) (PP)
	0 – 3	04:06 - Welter (Sich, Velemirovich) (PP)
Hickman (Doherty, Zoryk) - 24:33	1 – 3
Zoryk (Rochefort, Thomas) - 38:38	2 – 3
	2 – 4	41:13 - Stephens (Clarke, Row) (PP)
Webb (Doherty, Zoryk) - 41:40	3 – 4
	3 – 5	41:52 - Welter (Sich, Velemirovich)
Garner (Thomas, Murphy) - 42:12	4 – 5
Thomas (LeColst, Zoryk) - 48:05	5 – 5
	5 – 6	53:44 - Row (Welter, Sich)

16 min
Penalties
16 min
31
Shots
38

April 16, 2007; 7:35 pm	Fayetteville	2 – 3	Jacksonville	Jacksonville Ice, Jacksonville, FL; Attendance: 712

Game reference

Chad Collins
Goalies
Ryan Person
Referee:
Zac Wiebe

	0 – 1	01:51 - Doherty (Webb, Hickman)
	0 – 2	09:14 - LeColst (Zoryk, Thomas)
Sich (Clarke, Welter) (PP) - 30:36	1 – 2
	1 – 3	37:06 - LeColst (Webb, Wagner) (PP)
Velemirovich (Welter, Clarke) (PP) - 50:49	2 – 3

12 min
Penalties
14 min
40
Shots
30

April 18, 2007; 8:00 pm	Fayetteville	5 – 3	Jacksonville	Jacksonville Ice, Jacksonville, FL; Attendance: 806

Game reference

Chad Collins
Goalies
Ryan Person
Referee:
Scott Bokal

Stephens (Dobek, Clarke) (PP) - 01:42	1 – 0
Sich (Welter, Velemirovich) (PP) - 06:18	2 – 0
Norrington (Welter) - 27:01	3 – 0
	3 – 1	34:13 - Webb (Hickman)
Sich (Row) (PP) - 37:07	4 – 1
	4 – 2	46:30 - Garner (Cassells, Murphy) (PP)
	4 – 3	54:10 - Webb (Doherty, Garner)
Tataryn (Stephens) (EN) - 59:11	5 – 3

20 min
Penalties
32 min
37
Shots
38

== Awards ==
SPHL award winners were announced March 28, 2007.

President's Cup:	Fayetteville FireAntz
Commissioner's Cup:	Columbus Cottonmouths
League MVP:	Rob Sich (Fayetteville)
Rookie of the Year:	Tim Velemirovich (Fayetteville)
Defenseman of the Year:	Brian Goudie (Richmond)
Goalie of the Year:	Chad Rycroft (Columbus)
Coach of the Year:	John Marks (Fayetteville)
Franchise of the Year:	Huntsville Havoc
Playoff MVP:	Chad Collins (Fayetteville)

=== All-Star selections ===
1st Team All-Stars

(Canada) F Rob Sich (Fayetteville)
(Canada) F Allan Sirois (Pee Dee)
(United States) F Kevin Swider (Knoxville)
(Canada) D Brian Goudie (Richmond)
(United States) D Jonathan Lounsbury (Huntsville)
(Canada) G Chad Rycroft (Columbus)

2nd Team All-Stars

(Canada) F Tim Green (Columbus)
(United States) F James Patterson (Huntsville)
(Canada) F Tim Velemirovich (Fayetteville)
(United States) D Steve Howard (Columbus)
(United States) D Doug Searle (Knoxville)
(Canada) G Matt Carmichael (Huntsville)

Rookie All-Stars

(Canada) F Daryl Moore (Pee Dee)
(Canada) F Mike Tuomi (Knoxville)
(Canada) F Tim Velemirovich (Fayetteville)
(Canada) D Dylan Row (Fayetteville)
(United States) D Phillip Youngclaus (Richmond)
(Canada) G Doug Groenestege (Richmond)
