= Allan Sirois =

Canadian ice hockey player

- Born: February 19, 1975 (age 51) Rivière-du-Loup, Quebec, Canada
- Height: 6 ft 1 in (185 cm)
- Weight: 220 lb (100 kg; 15 st 10 lb)
- Position: Left wing
- Shot: Left
- Played for: AHL; Worcester IceCats; ECHL; Baton Rouge Kingfish; Jacksonville Lizard Kings; Pee Dee Pride; Florence Pride; Greenville Grrrowl; Texas Wildcatters; SPHL; Pee Dee Cyclones; Twin Cities Cyclones
- NHL draft: Undrafted
- Playing career: 1996–2009

Allan Sirois (born February 19, 1975) is the current head coach of the University of South Carolina's Men's Ice Hockey team and former ice hockey player. A career minor leaguer, he is the ECHL's ninth all-time career scorer with 594 points.

== Playing career ==
Sirois started his hockey career with stints with the Chicoutimi Saguenéens and the Rimouski Océanic, both teams of the Quebec Major Junior Hockey League, or QMJHL. In his one season with the Oceanic, he tallied a points total of 127. He then graduated to the Worcester IceCats of the American Hockey League (AHL). Sirois had only one point in two and a half seasons of work for the IceCats and moved to the ECHL with teams such as the Baton Rouge Kingfish and the Jacksonville Lizard Kings. He then moved to a more permanent job in the league with the Pee Dee Pride of Florence, South Carolina (his one-year stint with the Florence Pride is not a change of teams, but a name change by the franchise). He produced fifty points in all but one season, and surpassed the 500 point mark for his career before the Pride ceased operations in April 2005. He remained in South Carolina the following season to play for the Greenville Grrrowl. He produced 48 points for the Grrrowl in 2006. He later spent time with the Pee Dee Cyclones, Texas Wildcatters and Twin City Cyclones, last playing in 2008–09.

== Career statistics ==
			Regular season					Playoffs
Season	Team	League	GP	G	A	Pts	PIM	GP	G	A	Pts	PIM
1992–93	Chicoutimi Sagueneens	QMJHL	68	6	16	22	62	4	1	0	1	0
1993–94	Chicoutimi Sagueneens	QMJHL	70	32	37	69	145	27	5	14	19	29
1994–95	Chicoutimi Sagueneens	QMJHL	68	23	41	64	184	13	2	8	10	10
1995–96	Rimouski Oceanic	QMJHL	69	59	68	127	169	10	4	10	14	15
1995–96	Worcester IceCats	AHL	2	1	0	1	0	—	—	—	—	—
1996–97	Baton Rouge Kingfish	ECHL	62	29	29	58	64	—	—	—	—	—
1996–97	Worcester IceCats	AHL	2	0	0	0	0	—	—	—	—	—
1997–98	Worcester IceCats	AHL	3	0	0	0	2	—	—	—	—	—
1997–98	Baton Rouge Kingfish	ECHL	37	7	17	24	80	—	—	—	—	—
1997–98	Jacksonville Lizard Kings	ECHL	28	16	13	29	40	—	—	—	—	—
1998–99	Pee Dee Pride	ECHL	70	35	49	84	105	13	4	13	17	14
1999–00	Pee Dee Pride	ECHL	69	20	38	58	108	5	1	3	4	2
2000–01	Pee Dee Pride	ECHL	71	26	37	63	118	10	2	4	6	10
2001–02	Pee Dee Pride	ECHL	72	37	32	69	145	9	5	2	7	8
2002–03	Pee Dee Pride	ECHL	71	20	29	49	127	7	2	0	2	12
2003–04	Florence Pride	ECHL	61	16	38	54	63	—	—	—	—	—
2004–05	Pee Dee Pride	ECHL	72	22	33	55	94	—	—	—	—	—
2005–06	Greenville Grrrowl	ECHL	65	20	28	48	63	6	2	3	5	12
2006–07	Pee Dee Cyclones	SPHL	53	30	48	78	161	—	—	—	—	—
2006–07	Texas Wildcatters	ECHL	9	1	2	3	4	10	0	2	2	8
2007–08	Twin City Cyclones	SPHL	38	24	23	47	49	2	0	3	3	0
2008–09	Twin City Cyclones	SPHL	33	14	12	26	35	—	—	—	—	—
ECHL totals			687	249	345	594	1011	60	16	27	43	66
