= Richmond Renegades (SPHL) =

- City: Richmond, Virginia
- League: Southern Professional Hockey League
- Founded: 2006
- Folded: 2009
- Home arena: Richmond Coliseum
- Colors: Blue, Gold
- General manager: Allan B. Harvie, Jr.
- Media: Richmond Times-Dispatch
- Affiliates: None Currently-Independent

Franchise history
- 2006–2009: Richmond Renegades

Championships
- Regular season titles: 0

The Richmond Renegades were a SPHL ice hockey team in Richmond, Virginia. The team, owned by Allan B. Harvie Jr., the founder of the former ECHL Renegades franchise, began play in October 2006 at the Richmond Coliseum. The team's first head coach was John Brophy. After the Renegades loss in the first round of the 2007 playoffs, Brian Goudie replaced Brophy as head coach.

The new Renegades replaced the United Hockey League Richmond RiverDogs, who relocated to suburban Chicago for the 2006–07 season to become the Chicago Hounds. The most recent Renegades were the second team with that name; the first was an ECHL team that played from 1990 to 2003.

The Richmond Renegades ceased operations at the end of the 2008–09 SPHL season.

== 08-09 Roster ==
Goaltenders
#		Player	Catches	Date of birth	Place of birth	Height	Weight
30	(United States)	Ryan Scott		April 8, 1983	Williamsville, New York	5' 10"	195 lbs.
31	(United States)	Mike Ronan	L	January 2, 1984	South Boston, Massachusetts	6' 1"	190 lbs.

Defenseman
#		Player	Shoots	Date of birth	Place of birth	Height	Weight
2	(United States)	Matt Withers		March 11, 1982	Laconia, New Hampshire	6' 3"	215 lbs.
10	(Canada)	Cody Cole		October 2, 1984	St. Catharines, Ontario	5' 9"	200 lbs.
14	(Uganda)	Arthur Kiyaga	R	September 29, 1985	Kampala, Uganda	5' 9"	177 lbs.
16	(Canada)	Dan Vandermeer – C	R	February 19, 1978	Caroline, Alberta	5' 11"	175 lbs.
21	(Canada)	Nathan Oke	L	May 22, 1985	Fenelon Falls, Ontario	6' 1"	202 lbs.
27	(United States)	RC Lyke	L	May 19, 1978	Poughkeepsie, New York	6' 0"	220 lbs.

Forwards
#		Player	Shoots	Date of birth	Place of birth	Height	Weight
4	(Canada)	Bill Zalba		September 14, 1982	Thorold, Ontario	6' 1"	204 lbs.
8	(United States)	Beau McLaughlin	R	December 29, 1981	Virginia Beach, Virginia	6' 0"	188 lbs.
9	(United States)	Justin Joy	R	July 5, 1982	Norfolk, New York	5' 8"	190 lbs.
12	(United States)	Jason Price	L	February 8, 1985	Farmington Hills, Michigan	5' 9"	177 lbs.
17	(Canada)	Trevor Karasiewicz	L	August 17, 1982	Thunder Bay, Ontario	5' 11"	185 lbs.
18	(Canada)	Dennis Sicard		June 5, 1985	Cobourg, Ontario	5' 11"	183 lbs.
19	(Canada)	Ryan Busby	R	June 11, 1983	Georgetown, Ontario	5' 6"	160 lbs.
20	(United States)	Matt Larke	R	July 15, 1987	Oxford, Michigan	6' 0"	190 lbs.
22	(South Korea)	Kyu Hun Kim		October 17, 1982	Seoul, South Korea	6' 0"	190 lbs.
97	(Canada)	Geoff Rollins	L	March 31, 1982	Okotoks, Alberta	6' 2"	200 lbs.

Staff
Title	Staff Member
Head coach	Brian Goudie
Player/Assistant coaches	(Official) Dan Vandermeer
Trainer	Rick Thomas
Equipment Manager	Andrew Dvorak

== Season-by-season record ==
Note: GP = Games played, W = Wins, L = Losses, OTL = Overtime Losses, Pts = Points, GF = Goals for, GA = Goals against, PIM = Penalties in minutes

Season	GP	W	L	OTL	Pts	GF	GA	PIM	Finish	Playoffs
2006–07	56	27	25	4	58	187	219	1940	5th	Lost in 1st Round, 1–2 (Ice Bears)
2007–08	52	27	22	3	57	178	174	1220	4th	Lost in 1st Round, 0–2 (FireAntz)
2008–09	60	30	27	3	63	215	235	1247	5th	Did not qualify

=== Attendance ===
Year	Total	Games	Average	League Average
2006–07	95,756	28	3,419	2,985
2007–08	101,476	26	3,902	2,969
2008–09	99,071	30	3,302	2,923

== Single Season Team Records ==
through 2007–08 season

Games Played: (56) Danny White (Canada) , JJ Wrobel (Canada) , and Phil Youngclaus (United States)

Goals: (33) Andre Gill (Canada) (2007–2008)

Assists: (57) Dan Vandermeer (Canada) (2007–2008)

Points: (70) Dan Vandermeer (Canada) (2007–2008)

+/-: (+23) Dan Vandermeer (Canada) (2007–2008)

Penalty Minutes: (428) Mat Goody (Canada) (2006–2007)

Wins: (20) Doug Groenestege (Canada) (2006–2007)

Shutouts: (2) Doug Groenestege (Canada) (2006–2007), Ryan Senft (Canada) (2007–2008)

Minutes: (2254:18) Doug Groenestege (Canada) (2006–2007)

GAA: (3.13) Ryan Senft (Canada) (2007–2008)

Saves: (1333) Doug Groenestege (Canada) (2006–2007)

SV%: (.909) Doug Groenestege (Canada) (2006–2007)

== Retired numbers ==
#	Name	Position	Years in Richmond	Note
7	Brian Goudie	D	ECHL Richmond Renegades 95–97, 01–03, UHL Richmond RiverDogs 03-06, SPHL Richmond Renegades 06-07	Retired on Nov 9th, 2007
25	Trevor Senn	F	ECHL Richmond Renegades 94–97, 98–00, UHL Richmond RiverDogs 04-05	Retired on Dec 28th, 2007

== Honors ==
2006–2007	SPHL	Brian Goudie	Defenseman of the Year
2007–2008	SPHL	Dan Vandermeer	Defenseman of the Year
