= Bogdan Rudenko =

Kazakh ice hockey player (born 1977)

- Born: September 13, 1977 (age 48) Ust Kamenogorsk, Kazakh SSR, Soviet Union
- Height: 6 ft 0 in (183 cm)
- Weight: 200 lb (91 kg; 14 st 4 lb)
- Position: Right wing
- Shot: Right
- Played for: Torpedo Ust-Kamenogorsk; Avangard Omsk; Kitchener Rangers; Kingston Frontenacs; Sarnia Sting; Quad City Mallards; Colorado Gold Kings; Idaho Steelheads; Asheville Smoke; Wheeling Nailers; Columbus Cottonmouths; Jackson Bandits; Adirondack Icehawks; Charlotte Checkers; Florida Everblades; Pensacola Ice Pilots; Fort Wayne Komets; Flint Generals; Twin City Cyclones.
- NHL draft: Undrafted
- Playing career: 1994–2009

Bogdan Nikolaevich Rudenko (Russian: Богдан Николаевич Руде́нко; born September 13, 1977) is a Kazakhstani retired ice hockey player.

== Career overview ==
Rudenko began his career playing hockey in Russia with Avangard Omsk, but he quickly moved to Canada, playing for the Kitchener Rangers, Kingston Frontenacs, and Sarnia Sting. He then spent several seasons bouncing between various teams in the United Hockey League and the ECHL, before spending his final season with the Twin City Cyclones of the SPHL in 2008-2009. He also played for the Colorado Gold Kings in the WCHL as well as the Idaho Steelheads.

== Career statistics ==
			Regular season					Playoffs
Season	Team	League	GP	G	A	Pts	PIM	GP	G	A	Pts	PIM
1993–94	Torpedo Ust-Kamenogorsk	IHL	2	0	0	0	2	—	—	—	—	—
1994–95	Avangard Omsk	IHL	14	3	1	4	0	5	1	0	1	4
1995–96	Kitchener Rangers	OHL	28	7	4	11	24	6	0	0	0	4
1996–97	Kingston Frontenacs	OHL	16	1	4	5	17	—	—	—	—	—
1996–97	Sarnia Sting	OHL	28	8	4	12	26	12	2	2	4	2
1997–98	Quad City Mallards	UHL	69	22	27	49	174	13	2	3	5	16
1998–99	Colorado Gold Kings	WCHL	51	13	11	24	174	3	0	2	2	6
1999–00	Colorado Gold Kings	WCHL	47	9	17	26	127	—	—	—	—	—
1999–00	Idaho Steelheads	WCHL	9	5	1	6	6	3	0	0	0	0
2000–01	Asheville Smoke	UHL	44	28	18	46	124	11	5	8	13	24
2001–02	Wheeling Nailers	ECHL	32	12	8	20	63	—	—	—	—	—
2001–02	Columbus Cottonmouths	ECHL	20	2	3	5	33	—	—	—	—	—
2001–02	Jackson Bandits	ECHL	14	4	5	9	21	9	3	3	6	12
2002–03	Adirondack IceHawks	UHL	74	34	31	65	99	4	2	1	3	0
2003–04	Wheeling Nailers	ECHL	41	17	26	43	80	3	0	1	1	4
2003–04	Kazzinc-Torpedo	Kazakhstan	2	6	4	10	6	—	—	—	—	—
2003–04	Kazzinc-Torpedo	VHL	8	1	1	2	34	—	—	—	—	—
2004–05	Charlotte Checkers	ECHL	19	8	8	16	28	15	5	1	6	14
2005–06	Florida Everblades	ECHL	32	7	8	15	67	—	—	—	—	—
2005–06	Pensacola Ice Pilots	ECHL	5	0	0	0	2	—	—	—	—	—
2006–07	Fort Wayne Komets	UHL	51	18	20	38	128	—	—	—	—	—
2006–07	Flint Generals	UHL	15	8	3	11	19	6	2	1	3	2
2008–09	Twin City Cyclones	SPHL	16	3	7	10	24	—	—	—	—	—
ECHL totals			163	50	58	108	294	27	8	5	13	30
