= Tyrone Garner =

Canadian ice hockey player (born 1978)

- Born: July 27, 1978 (age 47) Stoney Creek, Ontario, Canada
- Height: 6 ft 1 in (185 cm)
- Weight: 200 lb (91 kg; 14 st 4 lb)
- Position: Goaltender
- Caught: Left
- Played for: Calgary Flames; Vålerenga; Brisbane Blue Tongues
- NHL draft: 83rd overall, 1996; New York Islanders
- Playing career: 1999–2008

Tyrone Garner (born July 27, 1978) is a Canadian former professional ice hockey player. He played 3 games in the National Hockey League with the Calgary Flames during the 1998–99 season. The rest of his career, which lasted from 1999 to 2007, was mainly spent in the minor leagues. He was drafted by the New York Islanders in the fourth round, 83rd overall in the 1996 NHL entry draft.

== Playing career ==
=== Juniors ===
Garner played three National Hockey League games in his career, for the Calgary Flames in 1998–99 as an emergency call-up from his junior team, the Oshawa Generals. He posted a 0–2–0 record with a 5.18 GAA before being returned to the Generals, where he was named to the Ontario Hockey League's second All-Star Team in 1999.

=== Professional ===
Garner spent most of his North American career in the ECHL before moving to play in Europe in 2003. He was named the co-winner of the ECHL's playoff Most Valuable Player award in 2002 while a member of the Greenville Grrrowl.

While playing in Norway during the 2005–06 season, Garner suffered a horrible groin injury that ripped the muscles from the bone. Doctors told him that under no circumstances could Garner play as a goaltender for at least one year. So he skated as a forward with the Southern Professional Hockey League's Jacksonville Barracudas, where he scored 12 goals and 22 points in 47 games. He remained with the Barracudas during the 2007-08 SPHL season, where he scored 12 goals and 27 points in 41 games.

Garner also played as a forward with the Brantford Blast of Major League Hockey during the 2008–09 season, where he scored 11 points in 13 games.

== Career statistics ==
=== Regular season and playoffs ===
			Regular season									Playoffs
Season	Team	League	GP	W	L	T	MIN	GA	SO	GAA	SV%	GP	W	L	MIN	GA	SO	GAA	SV%
1994–95	Stoney Creek Spirit	GHL	10	2	7	1	589	62	0	6.32	—	—	—	—	—	—	—	—	—
1994–95	Hamilton Kilty B's	OPJHL	44	—	—	—	—	—	—	2.85	—	—	—	—	—	—	—	—	—
1995–96	Oshawa Generals	OHL	32	11	15	4	1697	112	0	3.96	.882	—	—	—	—	—	—	—	—
1996–97	Oshawa Generals	OHL	9	6	1	0	434	20	0	2.76	.909	3	1	0	88	6	0	4.09	—
1997–98	Oshawa Generals	OHL	54	23	17	8	2946	162	1	3.30	.899	7	3	4	450	25	0	3.33	.918
1998–99	Calgary Flames	NHL	3	0	2	0	140	12	0	5.18	.838	—	—	—	—	—	—	—	—
1998–99	Oshawa Generals	OHL	44	24	15	3	2496	124	4	2.98	.907	15	9	6	901	57	0	3.80	.900
1999–00	Saint John Flames	AHL	19	4	8	4	940	70	0	4.47	.874	—	—	—	—	—	—	—	—
1999–00	Dayton Bombers	ECHL	3	0	2	0	113	11	0	5.86	.771	—	—	—	—	—	—	—	—
1999–00	Johnstown Chiefs	ECHL	17	8	6	3	971	48	0	2.97	.898	1	0	1	59	2	0	2.03	.920
2000–01	Johnstown Chiefs	ECHL	5	3	1	1	306	15	0	2.94	.913	—	—	—	—	—	—	—	—
2000–01	Greenville Grrrowl	ECHL	35	17	15	3	2114	99	3	2.81	.917	—	—	—	—	—	—	—	—
2001–02	Greenville Grrowl	ECHL	29	12	12	5	1763	74	0	2.52	.925	14	12	2	803	33	0	2.47	.927
2002–03	San Antonio Rampage	AHL	1	0	1	0	60	5	0	5.00	.861	—	—	—	—	—	—	—	—
2002–03	Jackson Bandits	ECHL	39	18	17	4	2351	106	4	2.71	.914	1	0	1	76	3	0	2.35	.889
2003–04	Stuttgart Wizards	GER-3	54	—	—	—	3239	137	7	2.53	—	—	—	—	—	—	—	—	—
2004–05	Stuttgart Wizards	GER-3	39	—	—	—	2347	119	1	3.04	—	—	—	—	—	—	—	—	—
2005–06	Vålerenga	NOR	27	—	—	—	—	—	—	2.60	.914	—	—	—	—	—	—	—	—
2006–07	Jacksonville Barracudas	SPHL	47	—	—	—	—	—	—	—	—	8	—	—	—	—	—	—	—
2007	Brisbane Blue Tongues	AIHL	17	—	—	—	—	—	—	3.31	.877	—	—	—	—	—	—	—	—
2007–08	Jacksonville Barracudas	SPHL	41	—	—	—	—	—	—	—	—	8	—	—	—	—	—	—	—
ECHL totals			128	58	53	16	7618	353	7	2.78	.914	16	12	4	938	38	0	2.43	.924
NHL totals			3	0	2	0	140	12	0	5.18	.838	—	—	—	—	—	—	—	—
