= John Brophy (ice hockey) =

Canadian ice hockey player and coach

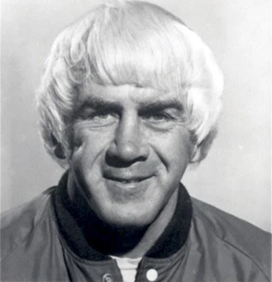
- Brophy in 1978 photo
- Born: January 20, 1933 Antigonish, Nova Scotia, Canada
- Died: May 23, 2016 (aged 83) Antigonish, Nova Scotia, Canada
- Height: 5 ft 11 in (180 cm)
- Weight: 175 lb (79 kg; 12 st 7 lb)
- Position: Defence
- Shot: Left
- Played for: Baltimore/Charlotte Clippers; Jersey Devils; Long Island Ducks; Milwaukee Chiefs; Moncton Hawks; New Haven Blades; Philadelphia Ramblers; Troy Uncle Sam's Trojans
- NHL draft: Undrafted
- Playing career: 1952–1973

John Duncan Brophy (January 20, 1933 – May 23, 2016) was a Canadian ice hockey coach and hockey player who spent most of his career in minor professional leagues, including 18 years as a player in the Eastern Hockey League and 13 seasons as a coach in the East Coast Hockey League. From 1986 to 1988 the native of Antigonish was head coach of the Toronto Maple Leafs of the National Hockey League.

== Playing career ==
Brophy made his professional debut for the Troy Uncle Sam's Trojans on October 29, 1952, and played in five games before he was released by the team. He was a tough defenceman who went on to play 18 seasons in the Eastern Hockey League, racking up nearly 4,000 career penalty minutes between 1955 and 1973—the most in EHL history playing parts of nine seasons with the Long Island Ducks and retiring at the age of 40.

On August 5, 1967, Brophy was involved in a car crash. He survived but his passenger, Dorothea Schiavone, was killed.

He had a part as a referee in a Schaefer Beer commercial which aired for about five years on various New York television stations.

== Early coaching career ==
Brophy had briefly been player-coach with the Ducks in the 1968–69 season, and became a full-time coach following his retirement as a player. He coached the Hampton Gulls for four seasons until the team folded during the 1977–78 season. He then joined the Birmingham Bulls of the World Hockey Association as assistant to coach Glen Sonmor, becoming head coach in 1978–79 when Sonmor joined the Minnesota North Stars. His team finished last in the league, but included several future NHL stars at the beginning of their professional careers: Rick Vaive, Michel Goulet, Rob Ramage, Craig Hartsburg, and Gaston Gingras, as well as a 36-year-old Paul Henderson. For the 1978–79 WHA season, even though his team was the only one in the league not to make the playoffs, Brophy was awarded the Robert Schmertz Memorial Trophy as the WHA's coach of the year. After the collapse of the WHA, Birmingham moved to the Central Hockey League and Brophy coached the team for another two seasons. In 1981, Brophy was hired by the Montreal Canadiens to return home and coach their AHL affiliate, the Nova Scotia Voyageurs. He held the job for three seasons.

== Toronto Maple Leafs ==
Brophy then joined the Toronto Maple Leafs organization, first as an assistant coach with the Leafs, then briefly as head coach of the Leafs' AHL team, the St. Catharines Saints, and then as head coach of the Leafs for the 1986–87 season. The Leafs showed some promise during Brophy's first season as coach, despite finishing the year with a losing record, but it all went downhill from there with an embarrassing season in 1987–88. However, the Norris Division was so weak that year that the Leafs actually made the playoffs despite having the second-worst record in the league. Brophy feuded with general manager Gerry McNamara, who tried to have Brophy fired but ended up being fired himself. After an equally poor start to the 1988–89 season, and despite being a favorite of Leafs owner Harold Ballard, Brophy was fired in December 1988, 33 games into the season.

== ECHL ==
Brophy then found a home in Norfolk, Virginia, with the Hampton Roads Admirals of the East Coast Hockey League. He coached the team for 11 seasons, from 1989 to 2000, winning the league championship in 1991, 1992, and 1998. The Admirals did not have a losing season with Brophy behind the bench.

After a game in January 1999, a fight broke out on the ice, and fans were throwing batteries. Brophy was accused of assaulting two security guards, but the guards said they were trying to keep him away from the Roanoke fans. In the end, Brophy pleaded guilty, was fined $1,000, and suspended for six games.

On June 25, 2000, Brophy was badly injured in a car accident near New Glasgow, Nova Scotia. He was listed in critical condition with a broken leg and a head injury. Brophy had fallen asleep at the wheel while driving.

After a successful recuperation, Brophy returned to the ECHL in 2001 as coach of the Wheeling Nailers for two seasons and retired. The ECHL's coach of the year award was renamed the John Brophy Award in 2003. As of 2006, Brophy is the all-time leader among ECHL coaches in regular season wins (480), playoff games (94) and playoff wins (55) and was inducted into the ECHL Hall of Fame in 2009.

== Later coaching career ==
In 2004–05, he coached his hometown junior team, the Antigonish Bulldogs of the Maritime Junior A Hockey League. For 2006–07, at age 73, he went back to Virginia as head coach of the Richmond Renegades of the Southern Professional Hockey League.

As a professional hockey coach, Brophy has accumulated 1,027 victories, the second highest amount in all of professional hockey, behind only Scotty Bowman.

After one season with the Richmond Renegades, it was announced that Brophy would be released from his contract. His replacement in Richmond was former team captain Brian Goudie.

== Death ==
Brophy died in his sleep at his home in Antigonish on the morning of May 23, 2016, from a long illness, aged 83.

== Coaching record ==
Team	Year	Regular season							Postseason
Team	Year	G	W	L	T	OTL	Pts	Finish	Result
Birmingham Bulls (WHA)	1978–79	80	32	42	6	-	70	6th in WHA	Did not qualify
Toronto Maple Leafs	1986–87	80	32	42	6	-	70	4th in Norris	Won in division semi-finals (4-2 vs. STL); Lost in division finals (3-4 vs. DET)
Toronto Maple Leafs	1987–88	80	21	49	10	-	52	4th in Norris	Lost in division semi-finals (2-4 vs. DET)
Toronto Maple Leafs	1988–89	33	11	20	2	-	(62)	5th in Norris	Fired
NHL Total		193	64	111	18	-	146		9-10 (0.474)
WHA Total		80	32	42	6	-	70		0-0 (0.000)

Preceded by Glen Sonmor	Head coach of the Birmingham Bulls; 1978–81	Succeeded by none
Preceded by Dan Maloney	Head coach of the Toronto Maple Leafs; 1986–88	Succeeded by George Armstrong
