= 2003–04 Knoxville Ice Bears season =

2003-04 Knoxville Ice Bears
- 2003-04 record: 26-30-0
- Home record: 15-13-0
- Road record: 11-17-0
- Goals for: 201
- Goals against: 195

Team information
- General manager: Preston Dixon
- Coach: Jim Bermingham
- Assistant coach: Preston Dixon
- Captain: Craig Desjarlais
- Arena: Knoxville Civic Coliseum

Team leaders
- Goals: K.J. Voorhees (50)
- Assists: K.J. Voorhees (51)
- Points: K.J. Voorhees (104)
- Penalty minutes: Jay NIemic (208)
- Plus/minus: K.J. Voorhees (+30)
- Wins: Blaine Russel (17)
- Goals against average: Kevin Block (2.01)

The 2003-04 Knoxville Ice Bears Season was the franchise's second year in existence and their first in the newly formed South East Hockey League. It was also the first season at head coach for Jim Bermingham, replacing Tony Martino who left to coach in Italy.

== Off-Season ==
The Ice Bears first off-season was an eventful one. First, the Atlantic Coast Hockey League folded, and the Ice Bears moved to the newly formed South East Hockey League. Then, head coach Tony Martino left to coach Italian team HC Varese. He was replaced by Jim Bermingham, a 10-year pro who played his final season in Knoxville during the Ice Bears inaugural campaign. General Manager Tommy Benizio was let go and replaced with assistant coach Preston Dixon, who also retained his coaching position.

== Season ==
The Ice Bears struggled for most of the season, finishing below .500 at 26-30-0, but still managed to finish 2nd in the SEHL standings. This season still stands as the only year the Ice Bears finished below .500, with the team just completing its 13th season of competition in 2015. Second year Ice Bear K.J. Voorhees finished the season with 104 points, amassing 53 goals and 51 assists. Voorhees' 53 goals still stands as an Ice Bears record, with no other player getting within 10 of his incredible feat during the Ice Bears' 13-year history.

The Ice Bears entered the SEHL Playoffs as the 2nd seed, and took on the Cape Fear Fire Antz in the first round, with the winner advancing to play the Huntsville Channel Cats in the Finals. The Ice Bears swept the FireAntz 2 games to 0, winning 6-4 and 4–3. The Ice Bears advanced to the Finals, but for the second straight year were swept, as the Channel Cats took the series.

The Ice Bears attendance plummeted during the season by 1,000 per game, almost forcing the team to fold. But local ownership stuck together and kept the team afloat.
