= Trevor Jobe =

Canadian ice hockey player (born 1967)

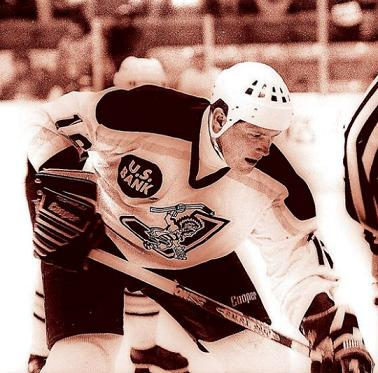
- Jobe with the Johnstown Chiefs in 1995
- Born: May 14, 1967 (age 59) Brandon, Manitoba, Canada
- Height: 6 ft 2 in (188 cm)
- Weight: 230 lb (104 kg; 16 st 6 lb)
- Position: Centre
- Shot: Left
- Played for: Newmarket Saints; New Haven Senators; Atlanta Knights
- NHL draft: 133rd overall, 1987; Toronto Maple Leafs
- Playing career: 1988–2005

Trevor Jobe (born May 14, 1967) is a Canadian former professional ice hockey centre. He last played for the Winston-Salem Polar Twins of the Southern Professional Hockey League in 2005. He is known for being a well-traveled, high scoring forward who has played for 35 different teams across North America and Europe.

Jobe finished his career with a total of 608 goals and 636 assists for a total of 1244 points over 17 season in the minor leagues but never played a game in the National Hockey League. He is the fourth all-time career scorer in the ECHL with 665 points, and his 608 career goals is the 8th highest total in minor league history.

== Juniors ==
Trevor Jobe suited up for five different Junior clubs in the Western Hockey League including three during the 1985-86 season. On February 11, 1986, Jobe was released as a member of the Spokane Chiefs. Jobe, who at the time was being treated for a knee injury, was released for an "undisclosed violation of team rules". That was his third and final team of the season, a year that he managed to play just 23 games and put up only eight points. The following year he joined the Moose Jaw Warriors and showed his offensive acumen scoring 54 goals in 58 games. His 87 points was good for second on the team behind Theoren Fleury. The next year he had 71 points and 36 goals in 36 games, but despite his goal-a-game pace, he was traded to the Prince Albert Raiders where he continued to score at torrid pace adding 33 more goals and 61 more points in 36 games to finish the year with 69 goals and 132 points.

== Maple Leafs ==
Jobe was invited to the Maple Leafs training camp for the 1988-89 season. At one point, General Manager Gord Stellick considered Jobe to be "one of five or six new faces who probably will be in this year's edition of the club". Instead, Jobe was sent to the Maple Leafs' AHL affiliate in Newmarket, Ontario, where he scored 47 points in 75 games. Jobe saw some ice time in the preseason with the Maple Leafs, including a fight with defenseman Gord Kruppke, a former 2nd round pick of the Detroit Red Wings.

== Professional ==
In 1989, Jobe signed with the Hampton Roads Admirals of the East Coast Hockey League. Jobe was in Norfolk for less than 24 hours before he played his first game. He scored 2 goals in his debut, and the Admirals were victorious over the Knoxville Cherokees, 5–0.

In 1990, as a member of the Hampton Roads Admirals, he was traded to the Nashville Knights. It was later found out that Jobe was traded because of his off-ice partying. Upon Jobe's return to the Norfolk Scope, he (along with former Admirals teammate Alain Raymond) were "bombarded with boos and obscenities". Jobe and the Nashville Knights lost to the Admirals, 10–3.

As a free agent at the start of the 1991–92 season, Jobe signed with the Richmond Renegades, because of his relationship with coach Dave Allison. Jobe, a former Maple Leafs draft pick, knew Allison from his time with the Maple Leafs. Renegades owner Allan Harvie also expressed interest in Jobe if he were to ever become available. Jobe scored 34 goals and 66 points with the Renegades.

On January 15, 1992, with the Renegades in a seven-game losing streak and looking for a shakeup, they traded Jobe (their leading scorer at the time) and Steve Scheifele, Richmond's fourth-leading scorer to the Nashville Knights for two contract-pro forwards, Andy Akervik and Kevin Sullivan, who were property of the IHL's Kansas City Blades earlier in the season. Jobe would later say that he has "no feelings or respect for Allan Harvie for what he did to me and my wife", after trading Jobe to Nashville while his wife was left behind in Richmond, eight months pregnant.

As a member of the Nashville Knights during the 1992-1993 ECHL season, Jobe completed what is considered to be the best statistical season in ECHL history. On December 10, 1992, Jobe was recalled by the New Haven Senators. Jobe scored 3 points in 3 games before being returned to Nashville. Upon his return from New Haven, Jobe started a scoring streak on December 19, 1992 that ran 86 days. On March 14, Jobe's streak finally ended. Over 38 consecutive games, Jobe scored 112 points. During that time, Jobe broke the single-season goal scoring record, previously held by Erie Panther Bill McDougall who had 80 goals. Jobe scored his 81st goal of the season on March 2, 1993, and finished the season with 85 goals. Jobe also broke McDougall's point record of 148 points by 17 points, giving him 165 for the season. During this season, Jobe led the league in shots (331), goals (85), power play goals (24), game-winning goals (10, tied with Wheeling's Darren Schwartz), and hat tricks (12, including a five-goal game on January 24, 1993 and three four-goal games). Jobe also became the first person to record back-to-back hat tricks in ECHL history. He scored three goals on October 20, 1992 in a 6–5 victory over the Knoxville Cherokees and matched the feat by scoring another three goals in a 7–1 victory the following night, also against the Knoxville Cherokees. He became the first person to score 50 goals in 37 games, a feat later accomplished by the Wichita Thunder's Paul Jackson. Coincidentally, Jobe later played for Wichita.

Jobe spent the 1993-94 season with Olimpija Ljubljana, a team in the former Slovenian League. Jobe was the leading goal scorer with 80 goals and led the league in points with 124 points. He finished the postseason by leading the league in assists (12) and points (22)

On September 29, 1994, Jobe re-signed with the Nashville Knights and spent 10 games with the IHL's Atlanta Knights, scoring 4 goals and 3 assists. He was returned to their ECHL affiliate in Nashville on December 20, 1994. In late December, Jobe joined the Raleigh IceCaps. He scored 3 assists in his first 5 games, but his plus/minus sank to a -5. He later negotiated a contract with a Swiss team during the season, only for the contract to fall through before he could play a single game. Jobe later rejoined the IceCaps.

Jobe started the 1995-96 ECHL season with the Johnstown Chiefs, thanks to a connection from his Nashville days: former head coach Nick Fotiu. He had a 12-game assist streak that was the second-longest of the season and included 15 assists. Jobe later set a league-high total for single shots in a game with 15 shots. He was later traded to the Tallahassee Tiger Sharks for right wing Alexander Savchenkov. Jobe finished in the top 10 of scoring. His 98 points were good for eighth-best in the league and his 43 goals were tied for seventh best in the league. Jobe left the ECHL as the all-time leading scorer and play his next season in the CHL.

Jobe signed with the Wichita Thunder of the CHL on August 29, 1996. On December 17, he scored 9 points in a 13–7 rout against the San Antonio Iguanas. This game was also known for having over 290 penalty minutes and 14 game misconducts. Despite being the league's leading scorer with 56 goals in 57 games, Jobe was traded to the Columbus Cottonmouths for Casey Hungle

On November 22, 1997, Jobe was arrested for driving while intoxicated. At approximately 3:00 am, Jobe crossed the center line on Milgen Road near Gunboat Drive and wrecked into a 1995 Geo Metro driven by 20-year-old Audry Thomas that contained two other passengers. He was suspended by the Columbus Cottonmouths three days later. This was Jobe's second DUI arrest in four months. Several weeks later, on December 11, Jobe was released from the team. It was later found out that the Jay Automotive Group lent Jobe a car, a 1996 Toyota Corolla, despite his history of drunk driving and knowledge that Jobe didn't have a valid license.

Jobe finished the 1997–98 season with the Flint Generals of the United Hockey League, where he finished the season with 24 goals in the final 22 games. Jobe reached the finals with the Generals, but lost to eventual champion Quad City Mallards in seven games. Jobe led playoff scoring with 11 goals and 7 assists, with a total of 18 points.

On August 26, 1998, Jobe signed with the Baton Rouge Kingfish, a team that was lacking scoring. On January 3, 1999, Jobe left the Kingfish to play for an overseas team (later the team was identified as Ljubljana Olimpija, a team in Slovenia that participated in a multi-national league that Jobe had played for earlier in his career). The Kingfish suspended Jobe indefinitely, and they eventually released Jobe on February 10, 1999. On February 15, the Amarillo Rattlers of the WPHL announced that they had signed Jobe to a contract On March 19, 1999, Jobe's all-time ECHL points record was overtaken by Darryl Noren, who scored a goal and two assists to pass Jobe's 634 career ECHL points. Jobe's all-time ECHL goal-scoring record fell shortly after. On December 29, 2000, Richmond Renegades winger Rod Taylor scored his 325th career goal, breaking Jobe's all-time mark of 324.

On December 7, Jobe was suspended by the league for a run-in with UHL Vice President Mitch Lamoureux. At the time, Jobe had 14 points in 15 games. On December 9, 2000, Jobe was released from the Elmira Jackals. On December 10, 2000, Jobe signed with the Mohawk Valley Prowlers and was waived several days later. On December 22, 2000, Jobe signed with his third team of the season, the Border City Bandits of the CHL. The league suspended operations of the Bandits on February 20, 2001, and Jobe returned to the Wichita Thunder, signing a contract with the team on February 27, 2001. Upon Jobe's return to Wichita, he was arrested at practice for a failure to appear in court for a 1997 DUI hearing. As a result of the hearing, Jobe was given a 180-day work release program, permitting him to leave jail for practices and games only.

Jobe started the 2004-05 season in the LNAH with the Saguenay Fjord, which included time as a player-coach. The Fjord folded after 24 games, and a special draft was held. Jobe was chosen by the Saint-Hyacinthe Cousin. He played one game with the team and was later released from the team. Shortly after, Jobe played in the Allan Cup tournament with Forestville Excavation A Savard of the Quebec Northeast Senior Hockey League (LSNEQ). Due to time constraints at the end of the season, the LSNAQ and the Lique Cenrale de Hockey (CHL) faced off to eliminate one league before the end of the season with the first-place teams as of December 18 facing each other in a two-game total goal series. Forestville was eliminated as a result. In the nine games that Jobe played with Forestville, he scored 11 goals and had 11 assists.

On January 28, 2005, Jobe signed a contract with the Winston-Salem Polar Twins. Originally signed to help out with the team's 5th-ranked (out of 8 teams) power play, Jobe ended up receiving more playing time than expected because of several players who had immigration issues. Despite finishing the season with 20 points in 17 games, Jobe also finished the season as a -33.

== Career statistics ==
			Regular season					Playoffs
Season	Team	League	GP	G	A	Pts	PIM	GP	G	A	Pts	PIM
1984–85	Calgary Wranglers	WHL	66	5	19	24	23	8	0	0	0	0
1985–86	Calgary Wranglers	WHL	7	0	2	2	2	—	—	—	—	—
1985–86	Lethbridge Broncos	WHL	5	1	0	1	0	—	—	—	—	—
1985–86	Spokane Chiefs	WHL	11	1	4	5	0	—	—	—	—	—
1986–87	Moose Jaw Warriors	WHL	58	54	33	87	53	9	4	2	6	4
1987–88	Moose Jaw Warriors	WHL	36	36	35	71	63	—	—	—	—	—
1987–88	Prince Albert Raiders	WHL	36	33	28	61	48	9	6	6	12	41
1988–89	Newmarket Saints	AHL	75	23	24	47	90	5	0	1	1	12
1989–90	Hampton Roads Admirals	ECHL	52	49	60	109	229	—	—	—	—	—
1989–90	Newmarket Saints	AHL	1	0	1	1	2	—	—	—	—	—
1990–91	Nashville Knights	ECHL	59	49	60	109	229	—	—	—	—	—
1990–91	Newmarket Saints	AHL	2	0	1	1	0	—	—	—	—	—
1991–92	Richmond Renegades	ECHL	34	36	30	66	74	—	—	—	—	—
1991–92	Nashville Knights	ECHL	28	18	19	37	81	—	—	—	—	—
1992–93	Nashville Knights	ECHL	61	85	76	161	222	9	7	7	14	38
1992–93	New Haven Senators	AHL	3	1	2	3	0	—	—	—	—	—
1993–94	HDD Olimpija Ljubljana	Slovenia	—	80	44	124	—	—	10	12	22	—
1994–95	Atlanta Knights	IHL	10	4	3	7	2	—	—	—	—	—
1994–95	Nashville Knights	ECHL	18	16	13	29	40	—	—	—	—	—
1994–95	Raleigh IceCaps	ECHL	23	18	22	40	42	—	—	—	—	—
1995–96	Johnstown Chiefs	ECHL	36	33	37	70	72	—	—	—	—	—
1995–96	Tallahassee Tiger Sharks	ECHL	20	10	18	28	26	12	7	1	8	10
1996–97	Wichita Thunder	CHL	57	56	69	125	139	—	—	—	—	—
1996–97	Columbus Cottonmouths	CHL	4	5	4	9	8	3	1	2	3	14
1997–98	Columbus Cottonmouths	CHL	12	15	18	33	16	—	—	—	—	—
1997–98	Tucson Gila Monsters	WCHL	23	15	14	29	35	—	—	—	—	—
1997–98	Flint Generals	UHL	22	24	15	39	10	17	11	17	28	29
1998–99	HDD Olimpija Ljubljana	Slovenia	4	2	2	4	0	—	—	—	—	—
1998–99	Amarillo Rattlers	WPHL	3	0	2	2	0	—	—	—	—	—
1998–99	Alexandria Warthogs	WPHL	13	3	9	12	22	—	—	—	—	—
1998–99	Baton Rouge Kingfish	ECHL	22	11	12	23	26	—	—	—	—	—
1999–00	Knoxville Speed	UHL	31	24	19	43	52	—	—	—	—	—
1999–00	Adirondack IceHawks	UHL	43	37	42	79	42	2	0	1	1	0
2000–01	Border City Bandits	CHL	21	12	11	23	46	—	—	—	—	—
2000–01	Wichita Thunder	CHL	14	9	11	20	20	—	—	—	—	—
2000–01	Elmira Jackals	UHL	15	6	8	14	10	—	—	—	—	—
2000–01	Mohawk Valley Prowlers	UHL	2	2	1	3	2	—	—	—	—	—
2001–02	Anchorage Aces	WCHL	13	6	4	10	4	—	—	—	—	—
2001–02	ERC Selb	Germany 3	19	16	14	30	61	5	4	0	4	16
2002–03	ERC Selb	Germany 3	8	4	3	7	45	—	—	—	—	—
2002–03	ERC Haßfurt	Germany 3	41	42	28	70	88	4	2	5	7	37
2003–04	Sherbrooke Saint-François	QSPHL	21	13	16	29	6	—	—	—	—	—
2003–04	Verdun Dragons	QSPHL	12	5	13	18	0	—	—	—	—	—
2003–04	Saint-Georges Cool FM 103.5	QSPHL	16	14	18	32	12	23	9	20	29	24
2004–05	Saguenay Fjord	LNAH	11	2	8	10	2	—	—	—	—	—
2004–05	Saint-Hyacinthe Cousin	LNAH	1	0	0	0	0	—	—	—	—	—
2004–05	Winston-Salem Polar Twins	SPHL	17	7	13	20	54	—	—	—	—	—
2004–05	Forestville Excavation	LHSSL	9	11	11	22	10	—	—	—	—	—
AHL totals			81	24	28	52	92	5	0	1	1	12
ECHL totals			353	325	310	635	967	26	19	13	32	78

== Records ==
ECHL

- Most goals in a single season - 85 (1992–93)
- Most points in a single season - 161 (1992–93)
- Most points in a single game - 10 (2-6-1993 @ Roanoke Valley Rebels)
- Most three-or-more goal games in a single season - 12 (1992–93)
- Highest goal-per-game average (Minimum 150 career goals) - 0.92 GPG (1989–93, 1994–96, 1988–99)
- Highest points per game average in a single season - 2.63 PPG (1992–93)
- Most 40+ goal seasons - 5 seasons (1989–93, 1994–96, 1988–99)
- Most consecutive 40+ goal seasons - 4 seasons (1989–93)
- Fewest games played to reach 50 goals - 37 games (1992–93)
- Most consecutive 100+ point seasons - (1990–93)
- Longest consecutive point scoring streak - 38 games (12-19-1992 to 3-14-1993, 112 points scored during this streak.)

CHL

- Most points in a game - 9 (12-17-1996 @ San Antonio)
- Most assists in a game - 7 (12-17-1996 @ San Antonio)

== Awards ==
ECHL

- Second Team All-Star, 1989-90
- Player Of The Month, November 1995

CHL

- Bill Levins Trophy, 1996-97 (2 teams)
- Leading Goal Scorer, 1996-97 (2 teams)
- Ken McKenzie Trophy, 1996-97 (2 teams)

UHL

- Leading Goal Scorer - 1999-2000 (2 teams)

Oberliga

- Champion, 2002–03
