= Chicago Hounds =

Chicago Hounds may refer to:

- Chicago Hounds (ice hockey team), defunct ice hockey team in Hoffman Estates, Illinois
- Chicago Hounds (rugby union), rugby union team
