= Mike Burgoyne =

Mike Burgoyne may refer to:

- Mike Burgoyne (ice hockey) (born 1980), Canadian ice hockey player
- Mike Burgoyne (rugby union) (1951–2016), New Zealand rugby union player
