= Winston-Salem Polar Twins =

Winston-Salem Polar Twins may refer to:

- Winston-Salem Polar Twins (SHL), a team that played in the Southern Hockey League (1973–1977)
- Winston-Salem Polar Twins (SPHL), a team that played in the Southern Professional Hockey League (2004–2005)

== See also ==
- Winston-Salem Twins (1905–1942), a minor league baseball team
- Winston-Salem Dash, a minor league baseball team (known as the Twins from 1954 to 1956)
