= Mike Murray (ice hockey) =

Canadian ice hockey player

- Born: August 29, 1966 (age 59) Kingston, Ontario, Canada
- Height: 6 ft 0 in (183 cm)
- Weight: 215 lb (98 kg; 15 st 5 lb)
- Position: Centre
- Caught: Left
- Played for: Philadelphia Flyers
- NHL draft: 104th overall, 1984; New York Islanders
- Playing career: 1986–1996; 1999–2003

Mike Murray (born August 29, 1966) is a Canadian former professional ice hockey player. Murray, a high-scoring center during his pro career, played five seasons (1989–1991, 1992–95) for the Knoxville Cherokees of the East Coast Hockey League and finished up his player career with the Knoxville Speed (1999–2001) of the United Hockey League and a brief stint with the Ice Bears of the Southern Professional Hockey League in (2002–03). Prior to his career proper, he also played in one NHL game for the Philadelphia Flyers during the 1987–88 NHL season. He is now the president, general manager, and co-owner of the Knoxville Ice Bears of the Southern Professional Hockey League.

Murray was born in Kingston, Ontario.

== Career statistics ==
			Regular season					Playoffs
Season	Team	League	GP	G	A	Pts	PIM	GP	G	A	Pts	PIM
1982–83	Sarnia Bees	WOHL	57	61	39	100	48	—	—	—	—	—
1983–84	London Knights	OHL	70	8	24	32	14	8	1	4	5	2
1984–85	London Knights	OHL	43	21	35	56	19	—	—	—	—	—
1984–85	Guelph Platers	OHL	23	10	9	19	8	—	—	—	—	—
1985–86	Guelph Platers	OHL	56	27	38	65	19	20	7	13	20	0
1986–87	Hershey Bears	AHL	70	8	16	24	10	2	0	0	0	0
1987–88	Hershey Bears	AHL	57	14	14	28	34	2	0	0	0	0
1987–88	Philadelphia Flyers	NHL	1	0	0	0	0	—	—	—	—	—
1988–89	Hershey Bears	AHL	19	1	2	3	8	—	—	—	—	—
1988–89	Indianapolis Ice	IHL	17	5	11	16	2	—	—	—	—	—
1989–90	EC Hannover	GER-2	24	19	14	33	16	—	—	—	—	—
1989–90	Knoxville Cherokees	ECHL	21	11	17	28	4	—	—	—	—	—
1990–91	Knoxville Cherokees	ECHL	56	33	37	70	18	3	0	1	1	4
1990–91	Kansas City Blades	IHL	2	0	0	0	0	—	—	—	—	—
1991–92	Odense Bulldogs	Eliteserien	28	23	35	58	34	—	—	—	—	—
1991–92	EC Braunlage	GER-3	41	73	62	135	39	—	—	—	—	—
1992–93	Knoxville Cherokees	ECHL	64	23	42	65	40	—	—	—	—	—
1992–93	Svegs IK	SWE-2	10	1	2	3	16	—	—	—	—	—
1993–94	Knoxville Cherokees	ECHL	68	32	45	77	36	3	1	3	4	2
1994–95	Knoxville Cherokees	ECHL	53	24	23	47	56	4	0	3	3	2
1994–95	Saint John Flames	AHL	—	—	—	—	—	4	0	0	0	6
1995–96	Cornwall Aces	AHL	1	2	0	2	0	—	—	—	—	—
1995–96	Dayton Bombers	ECHL	21	17	10	27	28	—	—	—	—	—
1999–00	Knoxville Speed	UHL	22	6	4	10	6	—	—	—	—	—
2000–01	Knoxville Speed	UHL	18	1	3	4	4	—	—	—	—	—
2002–03	Knoxville Ice Bears	ACHL	4	0	0	0	4	—	—	—	—	—
NHL totals			1	0	0	0	0	—	—	—	—	—

== See also ==
- List of players who played only one game in the NHL
