= Asheville Aces =

- City: Asheville, North Carolina
- League: SPHL
- Founded: 2004
- Home arena: Asheville Civic Center
- Colors: Blue, Green, Silver, White
- Owner: An ownership group of 6 people
- Head coach: Jeff Brubaker
- Captain: Peter Bournazakis

The Asheville Aces were a Southern Professional Hockey League (SPHL) team in Asheville, North Carolina. The team, which suffered limited success and low attendance, lasted only one year before disbanding. The team suspended operations on January 22, 2005. They had played only thirty-three out of fifty-seven games.

== Franchise History ==
The Asheville Aces were established in the summer preceding the 2004–05 season. The city of Asheville was perceived as a strong candidate for a minor league team in spite of the limited success and subsequent demise of the Asheville Smoke, which lasted from 1998 to 2002. Florida real estate investor David Waronker, representing the Southern Professional Hockey League (SPHL) began lobbying the city for rights to form a team. Meanwhile, John Cherney, the founder and first president of the South East Hockey League, also attempted to establish an SEHL team in the city. Concerned with the financial viability of a team in the municipally owned Asheville Civic Center, officials from the city of Asheville insisted that if a team was to play in the facility, it be part of a league that comprised at least six other teams. The SEHL at that time had only four teams. The SPHL had three teams in Jacksonville, Florida, Orlando, Florida, and Macon, Georgia, and promised more expansion teams were waiting to be announced until the sixth team came aboard. The city agreed and by the beginning of the 2004–05 season, the Asheville Aces were officially one of nine teams in the SPHL. Orlando's lease was revoked before the start of the season, but this still left the SPHL with eight teams. The Aces finished their only season with a record of 19–37–0, and missed the playoffs. The team then folded prior to the next season after failing to agree to a lease with the Asheville Civic Center.
