= Scott Hillman =

Canadian ice hockey player

- Born: April 29, 1974 (age 50); LaSalle, Ontario, Canada
- Height: 5 ft 7 in (170 cm)
- Weight: 175 lb (79 kg; 12 st 7 lb)
- Position: Defence
- Shot: Right
- Played for: ECHL; Toledo Storm; WPHL; El Paso Buzzards; Odessa Jackalopes; CHL; Odessa Jackalopes; Oberliga; EV Duisburg; RHI/MLRH; Buffalo Wings
- NHL draft: Undrafted
- Playing career: 1999–2007

Scott Hillman (born April 29, 1974) is a Canadian retired professional ice hockey defenceman. He was most recently the head coach of Frisk Asker in Norway’s Top Men’s Professional Hockey League

== Career ==
=== Player ===
Hillman was born in LaSalle, Ontario. After playing hockey in college for the University of Windsor, Hillman played professionally for the Toledo Storm of the ECHL, the Odessa Jackalopes of the Western Professional Hockey League and Central Hockey League, EV Duisburg of Oberliga, and the El Paso Buzzards of the Western Professional Hockey League. He also played roller hockey for the Buffalo Wings of both Roller Hockey International and Major League Roller Hockey.

=== Coach ===
After retiring from playing, Hillman became the head coach of the Knoxville Ice Bears of the Southern Professional Hockey League, winning both back-to-back regular season titles and league championships for both the 2007-08 season and 2008-09 season.

On June 2, 2009, Hillman was named the first head coach of the Missouri Mavericks of the Central Hockey League. In a 4-3 win against the St. Charles Chill on January 30, 2014, Hillman coached in his 300th Central Hockey League game. On May 21, 2014, Hillman resigned as head coach and director of player operations of the Mavericks to accept a coaching position with another team. A week later it was announced that Hillman would be the first coach of the new Indy Fuel of the ECHL.

On March 7, 2016 Hillman was relieved of his coaching duties by the Fuel and Bernie John was named interim head coach for the remainder of the 2015–16 season. On June 7, 2018 he took the role as head coach for Norwegian GET-liga team Frisk Asker. He was sacked before the end of the year.

== Awards and honours ==
Awards	Year
CHL Man of the Year	2001–02
Central Hockey League 2013-14 Season "Best of The Best" Poll	2013-14 Season; 2nd Place; Best Coach
SPHL Coach of the Year	2008–09
Coached in 2010-11 Central Hockey League All-Star Game	2010-11
