= Winston-Salem T-Birds =

- City: Winston-Salem, North Carolina
- League: South East Hockey League
- Founded: 2003

Franchise history
- 2003–2004: Winston-Salem T-Birds

The Winston-Salem T-Birds were an ice hockey team in Winston-Salem, North Carolina. They played in the South East Hockey League for the 2003–04 season. They did not qualify for the playoffs, and folded after the season.

== Season-by-season record ==
Season	League	GP	W	L	Pts	GF	GA	Place	Playoffs
2003–04	SEHL	56	18	38	36	178	245	4th	did not qualify

== Records ==
- Games: Chris Seifert, 55
- Goals: Chris Seifert, 26
- Assists: Chris Seifert, 32
- Points: Chris Seifert, 58
- PIM: Hunter Lahache, 228
