= 2008–09 SPHL season =

- League: Southern Professional Hockey League
- Sport: Ice hockey
- Duration: August 24, 2008–April 16, 2009

Regular season
- Season champions: Knoxville Ice Bears
- Season MVP: Travis Kauffeldt (Huntsville)
- Top scorer: Kevin Swider (Knoxville)

Playoffs
- Finals champions: Knoxville Ice Bears
- Finals runners-up: Fayetteville FireAntz
- Playoffs MVP: Kirk Irving (Knoxville)

SPHL seasons
- ← 2007–08 2009–10 →

The 2008–09 Southern Professional Hockey League season was the fifth season of the Southern Professional Hockey League. The regular season began August 24, 2008, and ended April 16, 2009, after a 60-game regular season and a four-team playoff. The Knoxville Ice Bears captured their second consecutive championship.

== Preseason ==
The Jacksonville Barracudas franchise was suspended from the season due to lack of a search for a arena. The team would eventually fold.

== Teams ==
2008-09 Southern Professional Hockey League
| Team | City | Arena |
| Columbus Cottonmouths | Columbus, Georgia | Columbus Civic Center |
| Fayetteville FireAntz | Fayetteville, North Carolina | Cumberland County Crown Coliseum |
| Huntsville Havoc | Huntsville, Alabama | Von Braun Center |
| Knoxville Ice Bears | Knoxville, Tennessee | Knoxville Civic Coliseum |
| Richmond Renegades | Richmond, Virginia | Richmond Coliseum |
| Twin City Cyclones | Winston-Salem, North Carolina | LJVM Coliseum Annex |

== Map of teams ==
SPHL teams

== Regular season ==
=== Final standings ===
| Team | GP | W | L | OTL | GF | GA | Pts |
|---|---|---|---|---|---|---|---|
| Knoxville Ice Bears^{‡} | 60 | 35 | 16 | 9 | 216 | 171 | 79 |
| Columbus Cottonmouths | 60 | 31 | 22 | 7 | 194 | 196 | 69 |
| Fayetteville FireAntz | 60 | 30 | 25 | 5 | 212 | 224 | 65 |
| Huntsville Havoc | 60 | 29 | 24 | 7 | 204 | 197 | 65 |
| Richmond Renegades | 60 | 30 | 27 | 3 | 215 | 235 | 63 |
| Twin City Cyclones | 60 | 25 | 29 | 6 | 208 | 236 | 56 |

^{‡} William B. Coffey Trophy winners
Advanced to playoffs

=== Attendance ===
| Team | Total | Games | Average |
|---|---|---|---|
| Huntsville | 106,848 | 30 | 3,561 |
| Fayetteville | 102,637 | 30 | 3,421 |
| Knoxville | 101,054 | 30 | 3,368 |
| Richmond | 99,071 | 30 | 3,302 |
| Columbus | 82,415 | 30 | 2,747 |
| Twin City | 33,909 | 30 | 1,130 |

== President's Cup playoffs ==
Semifinals
1 | Knoxville Ice Bears | 6 | 4 | 2 | 3 | 3
4 | Huntsville Havoc | 4 | 2 | 4 | 4 | 2
3 | Fayetteville FireAntz | 3 | 7 | 4 | 3 | 2
2 | Columbus Cottonmouths | 9 | 3 | 3 | 5 | 0

Finals
1 | Knoxville Ice Bears | 5 | 1 | 3 | 1 | 1 | 5 | 3
3 | Fayetteville FireAntz | 2 | 3 | 2 | 4 | 2 | 4 | 1

=== Finals ===
| April 3, 2009; 7:35 pm | Fayetteville | 2 – 5 | Knoxville | James White Civic Coliseum, Knoxville, TN; Attendance: 2,417 |

Game reference

Guy St. Vincent
Goalies
Kirk Irving
Referees:
John-Michael McNulty
Brent Coulombe

| | 0 – 1 | 01:55 - Swider (Harris, Vitek) (PP) |
| | 0 – 2 | 17:43 - Pelkey (Norrie, Harris) |
| | 0 – 3 | 27:14 - Vitek (Carter, Swider) |
| | 0 – 4 | 29:00 - Vitek (Harris, Swider) (PP) |
| Sich (Rapoza) (SH) - 44:36 | 1 – 4 |
| Moreland (Snyder, Leveille) (PP) - 53:47 | 2 – 4 |
| | 2 – 5 | 17:51 - Vitek (Swider, Martell) (EN) |

10 min
Penalties
4 min
41
Shots
33

| April 4, 2009; 7:35 pm | Fayetteville | 3 – 1 | Knoxville | James White Civic Coliseum, Knoxville, TN; Attendance: 2,519 |

Game reference

Guy St. Vincent
Goalies
Andrew Gallant
Referees:
John-Michael McNulty
Ryan Hersey

| Ruberto (Colangelo) - 38:19 | 1 – 0 |
| Sich (Snyder, Rapoza) (PP) - 48:23 | 2 – 0 |
| Ruberto (Colangelo) - 50:11 | 3 – 0 |
| | 3 – 1 | 54:11 - Vitek (Pelkey, Swider) (PP) |

16 min
Penalties
4 min
28
Shots
42

| April 10, 2009; 7:35 pm | Knoxville | 3 – 2 (OT) | Fayetteville | Crown Coliseum, Fayetteville, NC; Attendance: 2,113 |

Game reference

Kirk Irving
Goalies
Guy St. Vincent
Referees:
Dan Dreger
Curtis Marouelli

| Moore - 16:10 | 1 – 0 |
| | 1 – 1 | 27:47 - Ruberto (Colangelo, Snyder) |
| Furdero (Norrie) - 29:27 | 2 – 1 |
| | 2 – 2 | 36:36 - Olauson (Rapoza, Snyder) (PP) |
| Rebernik (Swider) - 75:53 | 3 – 2 |

12 min
Penalties
12 min
37
Shots
38

| April 11, 2009; 7:35 pm | Knoxville | 1 – 4 | Fayetteville | Crown Coliseum, Fayetteville, NC; Attendance: 2,111 |

Game reference

Kirk Irving
Goalies
Guy St. Vincent
Referees:
Tim Mayer
Curtis Marouelli

| | 0 – 1 | 32:33 - Sich (Hessler, Geerlinks) (PP) |
| | 0 – 2 | 33:40 - Olauson (SH) |
| Swider (Carter) - 38:03 | 1 – 2 |
| | 1 – 3 | 53:15 - Norrington (Colangelo, Ruberto) |
| | 1 – 4 | 59:54 - Sich (EN) |

4 min
Penalties
8 min
40
Shots
41

| April 12, 2009; 5:00 pm | Knoxville | 1 – 2 | Fayetteville | Crown Coliseum, Fayetteville, NC; Attendance: 1,810 |

Game reference

Kirk Irving
Goalies
Guy St. Vincent
Referees:
Tim Mayer
Dan Dreger

| Furdero (Rebernik, Moore) - 7:30 | 1 – 0 |
| | 1 – 1 | 24:29 - Snyder (Sich, Moreland) (PP) |
| | 1 – 2 | 26:40 - Sich (Leveille, Moreland) |

18 min
Penalties
16 min
44
Shots
38

| April 15, 2009; 7:35 pm | Fayetteville | 4 – 5 (OT) | Knoxville | James White Civic Coliseum, Knoxville, TN; Attendance: 2,128 |

Game reference

Guy St. Vincent
Goalies
Kirk Irving
Referees:
Curtis Marouelli
Brent Coulombe

| Olauson (Needham, Buccella) - 04:35 | 1 – 0 |
| Sich (Hessler) - 05:51 | 2 – 0 |
| | 2 – 1 | 08:22 - Pelkey (Carter, Keller) (PP) |
| | 2 – 2 | 29:26 - Pelkey (Rebernik) |
| Moreland (Leveille) - 34:42 | 3 – 2 |
| | 3 – 3 | 42:02 - Rebernik (Furdero, Pelkey) (PP) |
| Hessler (Leveille, Cryer) - 47:06 | 4 – 3 |
| | 4 – 4 | 58:49 - Vitek (Furdero, Carter) |
| | 4 – 5 | 71:52 - Pelkey (Harris, Pallardy) |

16 min
Penalties
16 min
36
Shots
64

| April 16, 2009; 7:35 pm | Fayetteville | 1 – 3 | Knoxville | James White Civic Coliseum, Knoxville, TN; Attendance: 2,705 |

Game reference

Guy St. Vincent
Goalies
Kirk Irving
Referees:
Curtis Marouelli
Tim Mayer

| | 0 – 1 | 03:21 - Norrie (Pelkey, Pallardy) |
| McConnachie (Ruberto) - 15:05 | 1 – 1 |
| | 1 – 2 | 17:52 - Rebernik (Harris, Furdero) |
| | 1 – 3 | 31:35 - Rebernik (Furdero, Norrie) |

10 min
Penalties
16 min
40
Shots
32

== Awards ==
SPHL Award winners were announced April 23, 2009.

| President's Cup: | Knoxville Ice Bears |
| Coffey Trophy: | Knoxville Ice Bears |
| League MVP: | Travis Kauffeldt (Huntsville) |
| Rookie of the Year: | Michael Richard (Twin City) |
| Defenseman of the Year: | Kevin Harris (Knoxville) |
| Goaltender of the Year: | Andrew Gallant (Knoxville) |
| Coach of the Year: | Scott Hillman (Knoxville) |
| Playoff MVP: | Kirk Irving (Knoxville) |

=== All-Star selections ===
1st Team All-Stars

(Canada) F Travis Kauffeldt (Huntsville)
(Canada) F Donald Melnyk (Twin City)
(United States) F Kevin Swider (Knoxville)
(Canada) D Kevin Harris (Knoxville)
(Canada) D Dan Vandermeer (Richmond)
(Canada) G Andrew Gallant (Knoxville)

2nd Team All-Stars

(Canada) F Tim Green (Columbus)
(United States) F Beau McLaughlin (Richmond)
(Canada) F Rob Sich (Fayetteville)
(Canada) D Corey Hessler (Fayetteville)
(Canada) D Lawne Snyder (Fayetteville)
(Canada) G Ian Vigier (Columbus)

Rookie All-Stars

(United States) F Sam Bowles (Columbus)
(Canada) F Ryan Busby (Richmond)
(Canada) F Michael Richard (Twin City)
(Canada) D Kyle Lundale (Columbus)
(Canada) D Travis Martell (Knoxville)
(United States) G Ryan Scott (Richmond)
