= Harrah's Cherokee Center =

Multipurpose entertainment center in Asheville, North Carolina, U.S.

Coordinates: 35.597547°N 82.555384°W

Harrah's Cherokee Center – Asheville
- Interactive map of Harrah's Cherokee Center – Asheville
- Former names: Asheville Civic Center Complex (1974–2011); U.S. Cellular Center Asheville (2011–2019)
- Address: 87 Haywood Street
- Location: Asheville, North Carolina, U.S.
- Owner: City of Asheville
- Capacity: 7,674 (ExploreAsheville.com Arena); 2,431 (Thomas Wolfe Auditorium); 500 (Banquet Hall)

Construction
- Groundbreaking: June 2, 1970
- Opened: June 22, 1974
- Architects: Lindsey Gudger; John Cort

Tenants
- Asheville Smoke (UHL) (1998–2002); Asheville Altitude (NBDL) (2001–2005); Asheville Aces (SPHL) (2004–2005)

Website
- harrahscherokeecenterasheville.com

The Harrah's Cherokee Center – Asheville, previously known as the U.S. Cellular Center and originally as the Asheville Civic Center Complex, is a multipurpose entertainment center, located in Asheville, North Carolina. Opened in 1974, the complex is home to an arena, auditorium, banquet hall and meeting rooms.

== Venues ==
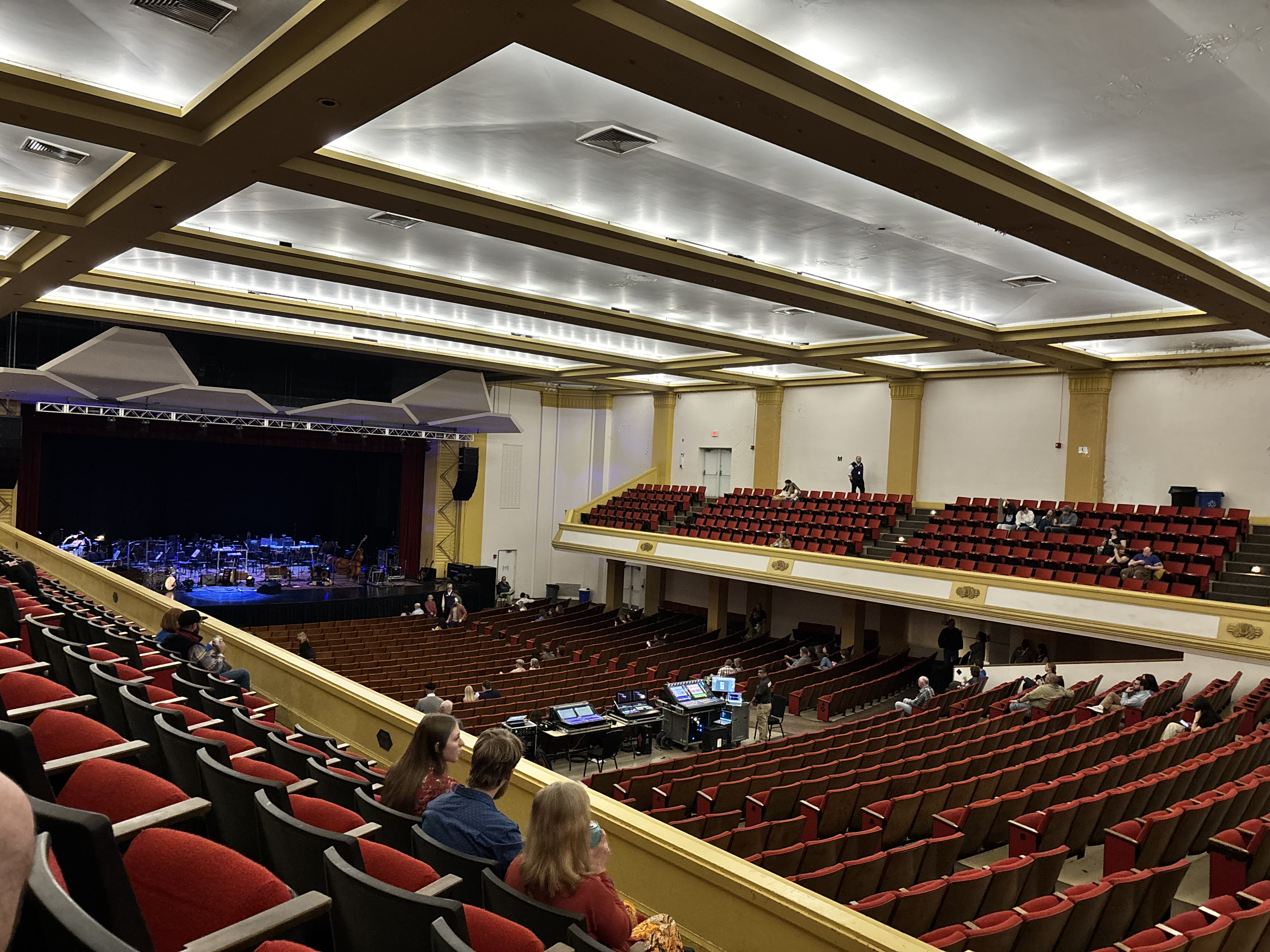
Thomas Wolfe Auditorium interior prior to a Gregory Alan Isakov concert in March 2025

- ExploreAsheville.com Arena (formerly the "Asheville Civic Center Arena" from 1974–2011) is the main arena/venue of the civic center. It holds 7,674 guests.
- Thomas Wolfe Auditorium (originally the "Asheville City Auditorium" from 1940 to 1975) is a horseshoe-shaped theatre located to the north of the arena. The auditorium was originally built in 1939 as a part of the Works Progress Administration. Opening in January 1940, it was renovated in 1974 and reopened December 1975. It can hold 2,431 guests.
- Banquet Hall is a ballroom that holds nearly 500 guests.

== History ==
In July 1968, the Asheville City Council approved a civic center plan which would add an exhibition center, meeting space and an arena to Thomas Wolfe Auditorium. As downtown was declining due to suburban development and malls, the complex would be a way to help downtown make a comeback. The arena was the first venue of its type in the city.

It was home to the Asheville Altitude basketball team in the NBDL, before the franchise moved to Tulsa in 2005 and the United Hockey League's Asheville Smoke and also the SPHL's Asheville Aces.

The venue was a major stop for Jim Crockett Promotions Mid-Atlantic Championship Wrestling in the 1970's and 1980's. It also hosted WCW Clash of the Champions XII, WCW SuperBrawl III, Fall Brawl (1995) as well as the 1999 and 2000 Big South Conference men's basketball tournament and 1984–1995 Southern Conference men's basketball tournament. The age and the condition of the facility helped lead to the Southern Conference's departure.

Commencement exercises for the University of North Carolina at Asheville were last held in the venue in 1999.

With the Civic Center losing money, improvements took place starting in 2010.

On January 1, 2025, the venue hosted All Elite Wrestling's (AEW) Fight for the Fallen television special. It was AEW's first event to be simulcast on television TBS and streaming Max. The event will help those affected by Hurricane Helene in Asheville.

== Proposed renovations ==
The City of Asheville and State of North Carolina have been pressured by many in the community to replace or renovate the aging Civic Center with more modern facilities. This debate has been going on for years, with no apparent end. City Council passed a measure funding basic maintenance and has earmarked $1.5 million for the implementation of a "living roof" to replace the aging conventional roof. The ultimate path for the Civic Center was unclear. A complete renovation was still an option. The most popular proposals from the community were to tear down and rebuild in the same location, or to rebuild in an area south of city hall, at the Biltmore Square Mall site, or near the Western North Carolina Agriculture Center.

Renovation of the Thomas Wolfe Auditorium has been considered since 1982 but nothing was done until 2020, when a $100 million plan was announced. The COVID-19 pandemic delayed that plan but as of 2023 the funding plan had still not been completed. However, starting in late July, the auditorium could no longer be used until HVAC repairs expected to take six to nine months. At an August 21 meeting, five plans were presented using numbers based on a 2028 start date for work. A basic plan would cost $42 to $52 million, while the most expensive or "Broadway" plan would require $183 to $193 million. The auditorium technically reopened in October with a capacity of 1,200 but had not events scheduled until January 2024, with full capacity to be ready March 2024.

== Naming history ==
On November 22, 2011, Asheville City Council voted to name the facility for U.S. Cellular, provided no other companies made a higher bid by December 31. The name change was effective January 1, 2012. U.S. Cellular will pay $810,000 or more over five years and up to $1.35 million over eight years. The money will help with $5.5 million in renovations.

On May 29, 2019, Asheville City Council approved a bid from Harrah's Cherokee. The five-year $3.25 million deal took effect in 2020.

== Events ==
The arena played host to the politically motivated Vote for Change on October 6, 2004, featuring performances by Gob Roberts, Death Cab for Cutie and Pearl Jam.

The Southern Conference brought the 2012, 2013, and 2014 basketball tournaments to the arena. In anticipation of the tournament, the city pledged a $3.2 million renovation of the facility. In February 2018 the arena hosted a Fed Cup tennis tie between the United States and the Netherlands, featuring Serena Williams and Venus Williams.

On August 13, 2014, a major motion picture named Masterminds was filmed outside and inside at the arena standing in as a Mexico airport with palm trees everywhere.

On August 14, 2024, former president Donald Trump held a campaign rally at the Thomas Wolfe Auditorium.

On August 10, 2025, Senator Bernie Sanders speaks to thousands in Asheville rally as part of the Fighting Oligarchy Tour.
