= Mike McGurk =

British Anglican priest

Michael Joseph Patrick McGurk (born 18 September 1968) is a British Anglican priest who served as Archdeacon of Liverpool, 10 September 2017 until January 2023.

McGurk trained for the ministry at St John's College, Nottingham; and was ordained deacon in 2007, and priest in 2008. After a curacy at Haughton he was Rector of Harpurhey from 2010 until his appointment as Archdeacon.
