= Brian Goudie =

Canadian ice hockey player and coach

- Born: November 9, 1972 (age 53) The Pas, Manitoba, Canada
- Height: 5 ft 10 in (178 cm)
- Weight: 200 lb (91 kg; 14 st 4 lb)
- Position: Defence
- Shot: Right
- Played for: AHL; Moncton Hawks; Hamilton Canucks; Portland Pirates; Baltimore Bandits; Springfield Falcons; Providence Bruins; IHL; Houston Aeros; Utah Grizzlies; ECHL; Hampton Roads Admirals; Richmond Renegades; Pee Dee Pride; Florida Everblades; UHL; Richmond RiverDogs; SPHL; Richmond Renegades
- NHL draft: Undrafted
- Playing career: 1993–2008

Brian Goudie (born November 9, 1972) is a Canadian former professional ice hockey defenceman/enforcer and coach.

Goudie played major junior hockey in the Ontario Hockey League with the Sault Ste. Marie Greyhounds before starting his professional career with the Hampton Roads Admirals midway through the 1992–93 ECHL season. He went on to play 16 seasons of professional hockey, including parts of 11 seasons in the East Coast Hockey League where he racked up 266 points and 2,253 penalty minutes in 598 games played.

Gouldie was an enforcer who was a central figure in the January 7, 1994 "Greensboro Brawl" during which 249 penalty minutes were given after just the first two seconds of play. During the 1995–96 ECHL season, Gouldie was suspended for eight games after he fired a puck at a linesman in the closing seconds of a game.

When Gouldie left the ECHL following the 2002–03 season, he held the ECHL record for most career penalty minutes (since surpassed by Cam Brown), and was ranked third on the league's list of all-time games played.

Following the 2006–07 season, in which Goudie was awarded the SPHL Defenseman of the Year and was named to the SPHL First All-Star Team, Gouldie hung up his skates to serve two seasons as head coach of the Richmond Renegades (SPHL).

== Awards and honours ==
Award	Year	Ref
SPHL Defenceman of the Year	2006–07	
SPHL First Team All Star	2006–07	
