= South East Hockey League =

- Sport: Ice hockey
- Founded: 2003
- Folded: 2004
- Commissioner: Jim Riggs
- No. of teams: 4
- Last champion: Huntsville Channel Cats

The South East Hockey League was a minor ice hockey league formed in August 2003. It succeeded the short-lived Atlantic Coast Hockey League and had 4 teams for its first and only season. Jim Riggs was the commissioner.

The Huntsville Channel Cats were the 2003–2004 President's Championship Cup winners. The Channel Cats defeated the Knoxville Ice Bears in three straight games in the championship series.

For the 2004–2005 season, the SEHL ceased play when two of its teams folded while the other two joined with teams from the World Hockey Association 2 to form the Southern Professional Hockey League.

== Teams ==
- Huntsville Channel Cats (folded; SPHL had an expansion team in the city)
- Knoxville Ice Bears (moved to SPHL)
- Cape Fear Fire Antz (moved to SPHL as Fayetteville FireAntz)
- Tupelo T-Rex (never played due to contractual issues with the Central Hockey League)
- Winston-Salem T-Birds (folded; SPHL had an expansion team in the city)

== 2003–2004 season ==
=== Regular season ===
Team	GP	W	L	T	GF	GA	Pts
Huntsville Channel Cats	56	43	13	0	233	164	86
Knoxville Ice Bears	56	26	30	0	201	195	52
Cape Fear Fire Antz	56	25	31	0	213	221	50
Winston-Salem T-Birds	56	18	38	0	178	245	36

=== Playoffs ===
Semifinal					Final
					1	Huntsville Channel Cats	6	3	4	x	x
2	Knoxville Ice Bears	6	4	x	2	Knoxville Ice Bears	4	1	2	x	x
3	Cape Fear Fire Antz	2	3	x

==== Semifinals ====
Huntsville received a bye into the final.

March 26, 2004	Cape Fear	2–6	Knoxville	James White Civic Coliseum, Knoxville, TN

Goalies	Blaine Russell
Scott Young; David Bagley / Goals / Kevin Swider; Alex Alepin; Todd MacIsaac; Todd MacIsaac; K.J. Voorhees; K.J. Voorhees

March 28, 2004	Knoxville	4–3	Cape Fear	Cumberland County Crown Coliseum, Fayetteville, NC

Game reference
Blaine Russell	Goalies
Ali MacEachern; Craig Desjarlais; Alex Alepin; Kevin Swider – 58:24 / Goals / Mike Bournazakis; Matt Kohansky; Matt Kohansky

==== Final ====
April 1, 2004	Knoxville	4–6 (1–2, 2–1, 1–3)	Huntsville	Von Braun Center, Huntsville, AL

Game reference

Blaine Russell
Goalies
Scott Graham

	0 – 1	4:45 – Jessi Otis (Reynolds, Carr)
	0 – 2	James Patterson (Buccella, Bresciani)
Mike Zeibay – 19:41	1 – 2
	1 – 3	Allan Carr (Patterson, deGuehery)
Kevin Swider (Miller) – 33:01	2 – 3
Rob Miller (Vorhees, Desjarlais) – 33:22	3 – 3
	3 – 4	50:43 – Allan Carr (Reynolds)
Tom McMonagle (Vorhees, Swider) – 53:50	4 – 4
	4 – 5	55:03 – Dan Buccella (deGeuhery, Bresciani)
	4 – 6	58:46 – sh – Allan Carr (Patterson)

April 2, 2004	Knoxville	1–3 (0–1, 1–1, 0–1)	Huntsville	Von Braun Center, Huntsville, AL

Game reference

Goalies
Matt Carmichael

	0 – 1	5:37 – Luke Phillips (Otis)
	0 – 2	27:15 – Joe Urbanik (Bresciani, Otis)
K. J. Voorhees (Alepin, Desjarlais) – 35:23	1 – 2
	1 – 3	50:36 – Mike Degurse (Bresciani, Snitowsky)

36
Shots

April 4, 2004	Huntsville	4–2	Knoxville	James White Civic Coliseum, Knoxville, TN

Game reference
Matt Carmichael	Goalies
Mike Degurse; Mike Degurse; Mike Degurse; James Patterson – en / Goals / Kevin Swider; Craig Desjarlais

== Awards ==
League MVP:	James Patterson (Huntsville)
Rookie of the Year:	Allan Carr (Huntsville)
Defenseman of the Year:	Alex Alepin (Knoxville)
Goaltender of the Year:	Matt Carmichael (Huntsville)
Coach of the Year:	John Gibson (Huntsville)
Playoff MVP:	Matt Carmichael (Huntsville)

== See also ==
- List of developmental and minor sports leagues
- List of ice hockey leagues
