= Richmond RiverDogs =

Ice hockey team

- City: Richmond, Virginia
- League: United Hockey League
- Founded: 2003
- Home arena: Richmond Coliseum
- Colors: Dark red, navy blue, blue, white, silver

Franchise history
- 2003–2006: Richmond RiverDogs
- 2006–2007: Chicago Hounds

The Richmond RiverDogs were a minor professional ice hockey team based in Richmond, Virginia, that played at the Richmond Coliseum from 2003 to 2006.

The RiverDogs were formed during an expansion of the United Hockey League (UHL) in the fall of 2003, replacing the ECHL's Richmond Renegades, which folded in April 2003. It was originally owned by Dr. Eric Margenau, a New York–based psychologist who also owned several other minor league teams. In their first year of play in the UHL, the RiverDogs were coached by Rod Langway and won the Eastern Division in the regular season and made the playoffs, but lost in the first round to the Elmira Jackals. General manager Jeff Croop then fired Langway and replaced him with Don Martin. The following offseason, Dr. Margenau sold the team to Glenn Morelli and the team failed to qualify for the playoffs while also reportedly bouncing checks.

In 2005, Dr. Eric Margenau re-purchased the franchise along with Jay Acton and hired Robbie Nichols as head coach and general manager. On January 31, 2006, Nichols was announced to be leaving his post as coach of the RiverDogs on February 4 to join to the UHL expansion Chicago Hounds, which was also owned by Dr. Margenau, while staying on for the rest of the season as the RiverDogs' general manager. In April 2006, the Richmond Coliseum's management announced that the RiverDogs had missed several opportunities to renew their lease for 2006–07 and Margenau transferred all operations to the new Chicago team.

The RiverDogs were replaced by the second incarnation of the Richmond Renegades in the Southern Professional Hockey League in October 2006. Former RiverDog Brian Goudie was named player–assistant coach of the SPHL Renegades in 2006–07 and head coach of the Renegades in 2007–08.
