= Chicago Hounds (ice hockey team) =

- City: Hoffman Estates, Illinois
- League: United Hockey League
- Founded: 2006
- Home arena: Sears Centre Arena
- Colors: Torea bay, selective yellow, black, white

Franchise history
- 2003–2006: Richmond Riverdogs
- 2006–2007: Chicago Hounds

The Chicago Hounds were a minor professional ice hockey team in the United Hockey League (UHL) for the 2006–07 UHL season. They played their home games at the Sears Centre in Hoffman Estates, Illinois.

The new UHL team was approved for a new arena in Hoffman Estates in early 2005 to be owned by Dr. Eric Margenau, a New York-based psychologist who also owned several other minor league teams including the Chicago Slaughter indoor football team. On January 31, 2006, Robbie Nichols was announced to be leaving his post as coach of the Richmond RiverDogs, which was also owned by Dr. Margenau, to start up the new UHL team in Chicago. The Hounds franchise was then officially a relocation of the RiverDogs after the owners did not renew their lease in Richmond.

Nichols left the Chicago franchise in April 2006 to become head coach and general manager of the Elmira Jackals and the manager of First Arena in Elmira, New York. The Hounds then hired former Fort Wayne Komets' coach Greg Puhalski, who came in as the head coach with the most wins in UHL history. The Hounds got off to an inauspicious start as their first home game was canceled due to bad ice at the brand new Sears Centre. The game was supposed to start at 7:30pm Central Time, but the decision to cancel was not announced until 9pm. Several fans were alleged to have thrown rubber pucks for the Chuck-A-Puck promotion in the direction of UHL commissioner Richard Brosal, who was the one that made the official announcement to the fans.

Late in the 2006–07 season, the Hounds were sold to Craig Drecktrah, owner of the UHL's Rockford IceHogs. On June 6, 2007, Drecktrah ceased the team's operations citing his inability to negotiate a reasonable lease with the Sears Centre. Drecktrah stated the Sears Centre wanted him to take mostly weekdays, leaving the more desirable weekend dates for the other tenants. He also said the building management wanted to triple the cost of his lease. The team attempted to resume play in the UHL, which had rebranded International Hockey League, for the 2008–09 season, but Drecktrah was unable to secure a venue in the Chicago area.

In 2010, it was announced that Drecktrah would be bringing an ECHL team, the Chicago Express, to the Sears Centre, which competed in the 2011–12 season before ceasing operations.
