= 2007–08 SPHL season =

- League: Southern Professional Hockey League
- Sport: Ice hockey
- Duration: October 25, 2007–April 13, 2008

Regular season
- Season champions: Knoxville Ice Bears
- Season MVP: Kevin Swider (Knoxville)
- Top scorer: Kevin Swider (Knoxville)

Playoffs
- Finals champions: Knoxville Ice Bears
- Finals runners-up: Jacksonville Barracudas

SPHL seasons
- ← 2006–07 2008–09 →

The 2007–08 Southern Professional Hockey League season was the fourth season of the Southern Professional Hockey League. The regular season began October 25, 2007, and ended April 13, 2008, after a 52-game regular season and a six-team playoff. The Knoxville Ice Bears won their second SPHL championship.

== Preseason ==
The Pee Dee Cyclones moved from Florence, South Carolina, to Winston-Salem, North Carolina, and changed their name to the Twin City Cyclones. The league also named a new commissioner, Jim Combs, in June 2007.

== Teams ==
2007-08 Southern Professional Hockey League
Team	City	Arena
Columbus Cottonmouths	Columbus, Georgia	Columbus Civic Center
Fayetteville FireAntz	Fayetteville, North Carolina	Cumberland County Crown Coliseum
Huntsville Havoc	Huntsville, Alabama	Von Braun Center
Jacksonville Barracudas	Jacksonville, Florida	Jacksonville Veterans Memorial Arena
Knoxville Ice Bears	Knoxville, Tennessee	Knoxville Civic Coliseum
Richmond Renegades	Richmond, Virginia	Richmond Coliseum
Twin City Cyclones	Winston-Salem, North Carolina	LJVM Coliseum Annex

== Map of teams ==
SPHL teams

== Regular season ==
=== Final standings ===
Team	GP	W	L	OTL	GF	GA	Pts
Knoxville Ice Bears^{‡}	52	32	16	4	199	169	68
Jacksonville Barracudas	52	30	17	5	201	167	65
Fayetteville FireAntz	52	25	19	8	186	198	58
Richmond Renegades	52	27	22	3	178	174	57
Twin City Cyclones	52	23	25	4	185	207	50
Columbus Cottonmouths	52	24	22	6	168	186	50
Huntsville Havoc	52	23	27	2	195	211	48

^{‡} William B. Coffey Trophy winners
Advanced to playoffs

=== Attendance ===
Team	Total	Games	Average
Fayetteville	102,208	26	3,931
Richmond	101,476	26	3,902
Huntsville	99,672	26	3,833
Knoxville	93,633	26	3,601
Columbus	83,590	26	3,215
Twin City	30,698	26	1,180
Jacksonville	29,200	26	1,123

== President's Cup playoffs ==
First round
1	Knoxville Ice Bears	4	5	2	2	6
6	Columbus Cottonmouths	2	2	4	4	3
3	Fayetteville FireAntz	4	5	x
4	Richmond Renegades	1	4	x
5	Twin City Cyclones	3	4	x
2	Jacksonville Barracudas	4	7	x

Second round
3	Fayetteville FireAntz	2	1	3
2	Jacksonville Barracudas	1	2	6

Final
1	Knoxville Ice Bears	6	4	4	x	x
2	Jacksonville Barracudas	2	3	2	x	x

=== Finals ===
April 10, 2008; 7:30 pm	Jacksonville	2 – 6	Knoxville	James White Civic Coliseum, Knoxville, TN; Attendance: 1,971

Game reference

Tim Haun
Goalies
Kirk Irving
Referee:
Nick Krebsbach

	0 – 1	02:22 - Rutt (Manny)
Furdero (Rebernik, Morris) - 04:16	1 – 1
	1 – 2	19:47 - Swider (Harris)
	1 – 3	34:52 - Rutt (Cherneski, Harris)
	1 – 4	36:20 - Craigen (Swider, Harris) (PP)
	1 – 5	45:54 - Pelkey (Manny, Harris) (SH)
Rollins (Wagner, Thomas) - 47:11	2 – 5
	2 – 6	54:22 - Vitek (Harris, Swider) (PP)

8 min
Penalties
6 min
21
Shots
35

April 12, 2008; 7:35 pm	Knoxville	4 – 3	Jacksonville	Jacksonville Ice, Jacksonville, FL; Attendance: 1,656

Game reference

Kirk Irving
Goalies
Ryan Person
Referee:
Joe Sullivan

Vitek (Swider) - 02:26 (PP)	1 – 0
Wrobel (Harris, Swider) - 27:06 (PP)	2 – 0
	2 – 1	29:53 - Webb (Geerlinks, Shaw)
Vitek (Swider, Craigen) - 31:37 (PP)	3 – 1
	3 – 2	40:17 - Rebernik (Thomas, Wagner)
Pelkey (Rutt) - 46:57	4 – 2
	4 – 3	48:57 - Swartzentruber (Webb, Colangelo)

25 min
Penalties
21 min
20
Shots
42

April 13, 2008; 7:30 pm	Jacksonville	2 – 4	Knoxville	James White Civic Coliseum, Knoxville, TN; Attendance: 2,229

Game reference

Ryan Person
Goalies
Kirk Irving
Referee:
Dan Dreger

	0 – 1	01:19 - Pelkey (Rutt)
	0 – 2	09:51 - Swider (Smith, Craigen)
Thomas (Wagner, Geerlinks) - 12:12	1 – 2
Webb (MacDonald, Rochefort) - 12:22	2 – 2
	2 – 3	37:32 - Vitek (Lynch, Craigen)
	2 – 4	53:53 - Vitek (Harris, Swider) (PP)

8 min
Penalties
10 min
32
Shots
24

== Awards ==
SPHL award winners were announced March 24, 2008.

President's Cup:	Knoxville Ice Bears
Coffey Trophy:	Knoxville Ice Bears
League MVP:	Kevin Swider (Knoxville)
Rookie of the Year:	Taylor Hustead (Twin City)
Defenseman of the Year:	Dan Vandermeer (Richmond)
Goaltender of the Year:	Tim Haun (Jacksonville)
Coach of the Year:	Rick Alain (Jacksonville)
Playoff MVP:	Kirk Irving (Knoxville)
