= Mike Burgoyne (ice hockey) =

Canadian ice hockey player

- Born: 28 December 1980 (age 45) Hamilton, Ontario, Canada
- Height: 6 ft 2 in (188 cm)
- Weight: 200 lb (91 kg; 14 st 4 lb)
- Position: Defence
- Played for: ECHL; Victoria Salmon Kings; CHL; Missouri Mavericks; Oklahoma City Blazers; EIHL; Belfast Giants; UHL; Motor City Mechanics; Rockford IceHogs; Quad City Mallards; North Sea Cup; HYS The Hague; Allan Cup Hockey; Brantford Blast; Romanian Hockey League; Steaua Rangers
- Playing career: 2004–2017

Mike Burgoyne (born 28 December 1980, in Hamilton, Ontario) is a Canadian former professional ice hockey defenceman.

== Career ==
Burgoyne spent his Junior Hockey career with the Hamilton Kiltys of the Ontario Junior Hockey League and the Stoney Creek Spirit of the Greater Ontario Junior Hockey League.

Burgoyne began his post-Junior career with the semi-professional Brantford Blast of the Ontario Hockey Association's Allan Cup Hockey for the 2002–03 season. He then moved to the professional-level United Hockey League during the 2003–04 season, joining the Quad City Mallards. He spent the 2004–05 season with the Mallards, the Rockford IceHogs, and the Motor City Mechanics. After spending the entire 2005–06 season with the Mechanics, Burgoyne joined the Oklahoma City Blazers of the Central Hockey League for the 2006-07season, where he became a CHL All-Star. During both of his seasons with the Blazers, he led the team in assists and points. For the 2008-09 season, Burgoyne played in Northern Ireland for the Belfast Giants of the Elite Ice Hockey League. He began the 2009-10 season by playing 6 games for the Victoria Salmon Kings of the ECHL before becoming an Unrestricted Free Agent on 11 November 2009. On 25 November 2009, he signed with Missouri Mavericks of the Central Hockey League, playing with the team for the rest of the 2009-10 season. For the 2010-11 season, Burgoyne played in The Netherlands for HYS The Hague of the North Sea Cup. For the 2011–12 season, Burgoyne re-joined the Brantford Blast. He played 19 games in his second stint with the Blast, earning himself the award as "Best Defenseman" in Allan Cup Hockey for the 2011–12 season, before signing with the Steaua Rangers of the Romanian Hockey League. He rejoined the Brantford Blast for the 2012-2013 and remained there until his retirement.
