= Justin Keller =

Canadian ice hockey player

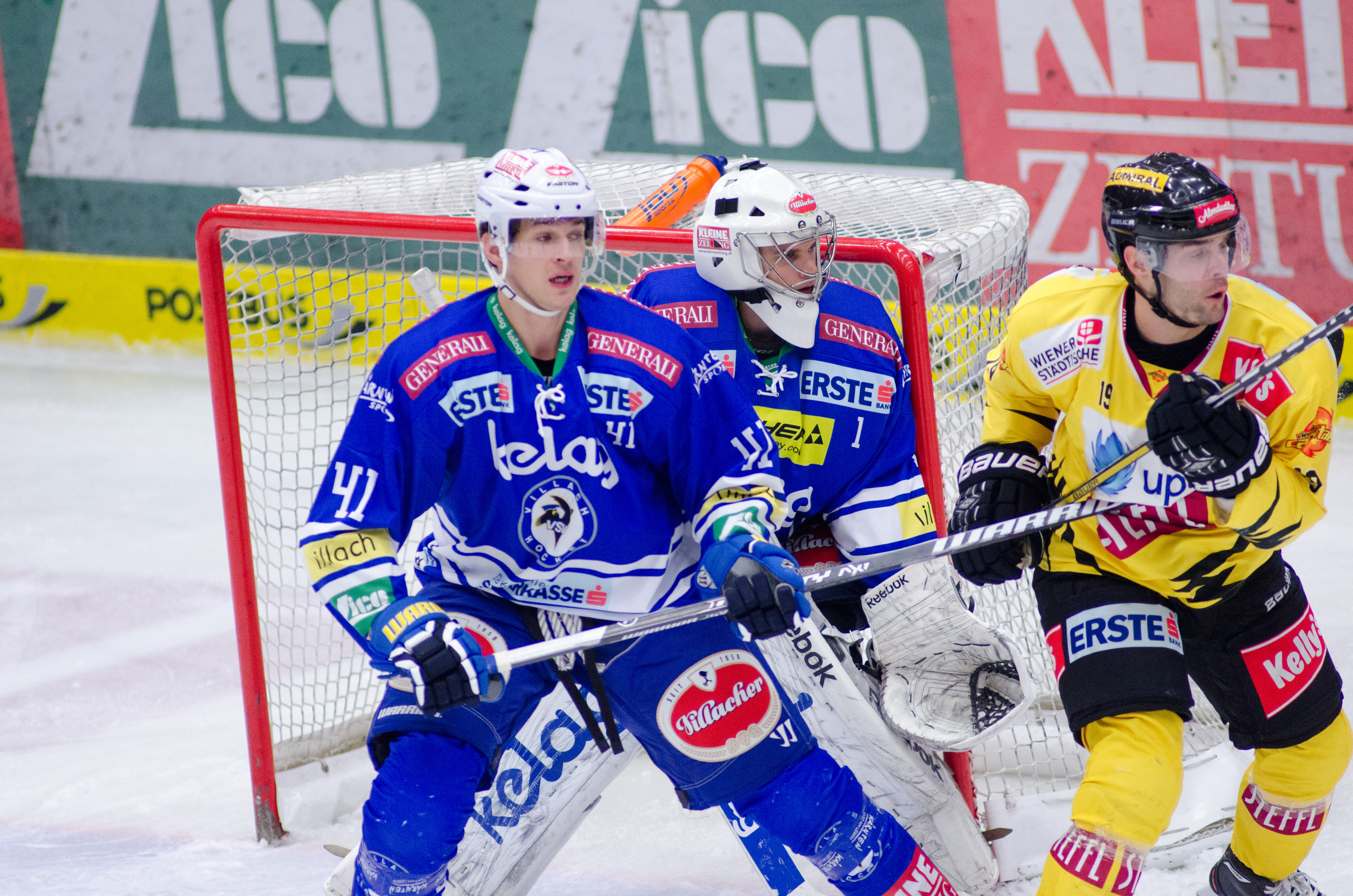
- Born: March 4, 1986 (age 40) Nelson, British Columbia, Canada
- Height: 5 ft 11 in (180 cm)
- Weight: 182 lb (83 kg; 13 st 0 lb)
- Position: Forward
- Shot: Left
- Played for: Springfield Falcons; Norfolk Admirals; EHC Black Wings Linz; EC Red Bull Salzburg; Vienna Capitals; HC Bolzano
- NHL draft: 245th overall, 2004; Tampa Bay Lightning
- Playing career: 2006–2015

Justin Keller (born March 4, 1986) is a Canadian former professional ice hockey forward who last played for Italian club HCB South Tyrol in the Austrian Hockey League (EBEL). He was selected by the Tampa Bay Lightning in the 8th round (245th overall) of the 2004 NHL entry draft.

== Playing career ==
Keller had played 256 games in the American Hockey League with the Springfield Falcons and Norfolk Admirals prior to signing with Austria's EHC Black Wings Linz for the 2010–11 season. He has also endured a shortened stint with EC Red Bull Salzburg before moving to another EBEL competitor the Vienna Capitals mid-season.

After spending the full 2013–14 season in Vienna, compiling 14 goals for 29 points in 50 games, Keller left as a free agent to sign a one-year contract with his fourth EBEL club and defending champions HC Bolzano, on August 21, 2014. Justin is currently playing local hockey in the Summerland Reds Tournament for the Ice Ninjas team.

== Career statistics ==
			Regular season					Playoffs
Season	Team	League	GP	G	A	Pts	PIM	GP	G	A	Pts	PIM
2003–04	Kelowna Rockets	WHL	72	25	21	46	44	17	4	5	9	18
2004–05	Kelowna Rockets	WHL	72	31	22	53	103	23	12	10	22	44
2005–06	Kelowna Rockets	WHL	72	51	37	88	82	12	3	6	9	14
2006–07	Springfield Falcons	AHL	60	13	11	24	26	—	—	—	—	—
2007–08	Norfolk Admirals	AHL	70	15	22	37	45	—	—	—	—	—
2008–09	Norfolk Admirals	AHL	58	18	19	37	52	—	—	—	—	—
2008–09	Augusta Lynx	ECHL	4	4	1	5	2	—	—	—	—	—
2009–10	Norfolk Admirals	AHL	68	17	7	24	45	—	—	—	—	—
2010–11	EHC Liwest Black Wings Linz	AUT	34	21	12	33	24	5	1	0	1	6
2011–12	EHC Liwest Black Wings Linz	AUT	44	20	19	39	32	17	9	5	14	10
2012–13	EC Red Bull Salzburg	AUT	29	9	14	23	10	—	—	—	—	—
2012–13	Vienna Capitals	AUT	23	7	5	12	16	15	6	4	10	16
2013–14	Vienna Capitals	AUT	50	14	15	29	81	5	1	2	3	10
2014–15	HC Bolzano	AUT	52	11	15	26	61	7	7	1	8	13
AHL totals			256	63	59	122	168	—	—	—	—	—
AUT totals			232	82	80	162	224	49	24	12	36	55

== Awards and honours ==
Award	Year
WHL
West First All-Star Team	2006
