= Twin City Cyclones =

- City: Winston-Salem, North Carolina
- League: Southern Professional Hockey League
- Founded: 2005
- Home arena: Lawrence Joel Coliseum Annex
- Colors: navy blue, red
- Owner: Bob Kerzner
- Media: Winston-Salem Journal

Franchise history
- 2005–2007: Pee Dee Cyclones
- 2007–2009: Twin City Cyclones

Championships
- Regular season titles: 0

Originally called the Pee Dee Cyclones, the Twin City Cyclones were a minor league ice hockey team based in Winston-Salem, North Carolina. They began play in the Southern Professional Hockey League (SPHL) in the 2005–06 season. In the 2005–06 season, they finished sixth out of seven teams in the regular season standings, made the playoffs, but lost in the first round to the Knoxville Ice Bears. In the 2006–07 season, their final in Florence, South Carolina, the Cyclones finished in seventh place and failed to make the playoffs. They were called the Pee Dee Cyclones as the region of South Carolina around Florence that is usually named after the Pee Dee River.

Unable to reach a new lease agreement with the Florence Civic Center, the Cyclones relocated Winston-Salem for the 2007–08 season. Two seasons later, on March 31, 2009, the Cyclones ceased operations, citing the American economic downturn as a reason for their folding.

In 2010, the Kerzners, the former owners of the folded Cyclones, were granted another expansion franchise in the Augusta RiverHawks.
