= Winston-Salem Polar Twins (SPHL) =

Defunct Minor League Professional Ice Hockey Franchise

The Winston-Salem Polar Twins were a minor league professional ice hockey team from Winston-Salem, North Carolina. The Polar Twins were launched in the 2004–05 season of the Southern Professional Hockey League, playing home games at the LJVM Coliseum Annex. The Polar Twins ceased operations after their inaugural season.
