= Knoxville Ice Bears =

Professional ice hockey team in Knoxville, Tennessee

- City: Knoxville, Tennessee
- League: SPHL
- Founded: 2002 (in the ACHL)
- Home arena: Knoxville Civic Auditorium and Coliseum
- Colors: Black, purple, orange
- Owner: The Knoxville IceBears Ownership Group
- General manager: Mike Murray
- Head coach: John Gurskis
- Media: Knoxville News-Sentinel; WBIR-TV; WATE-TV; WVLT-TV; WUTK-FM

Franchise history
- 2002–present: Knoxville Ice Bears

Championships
- Regular season titles: 5 (2004–05, 2005–06, 2007–08, 2008–09, 2021-2022)
- Playoff championships: 4 (2005–06, 2007–08, 2008–09, 2014–15)

Center Ice

The Knoxville Ice Bears are a professional ice hockey team. The team competes in the SPHL. They play their home games at the Knoxville Civic Coliseum in Knoxville, Tennessee. In 2006, the Ice Bears defeated the Florida Seals to take their first President's Cup. The Ice Bears won back to back President's Cup Championships in the 2007–08 and 2008–09 seasons. On April 18, 2015, the Ice Bears defeated the Mississippi RiverKings 4–2 to sweep the 2015 SPHL Finals and win their 4th President's Cup.

== History ==
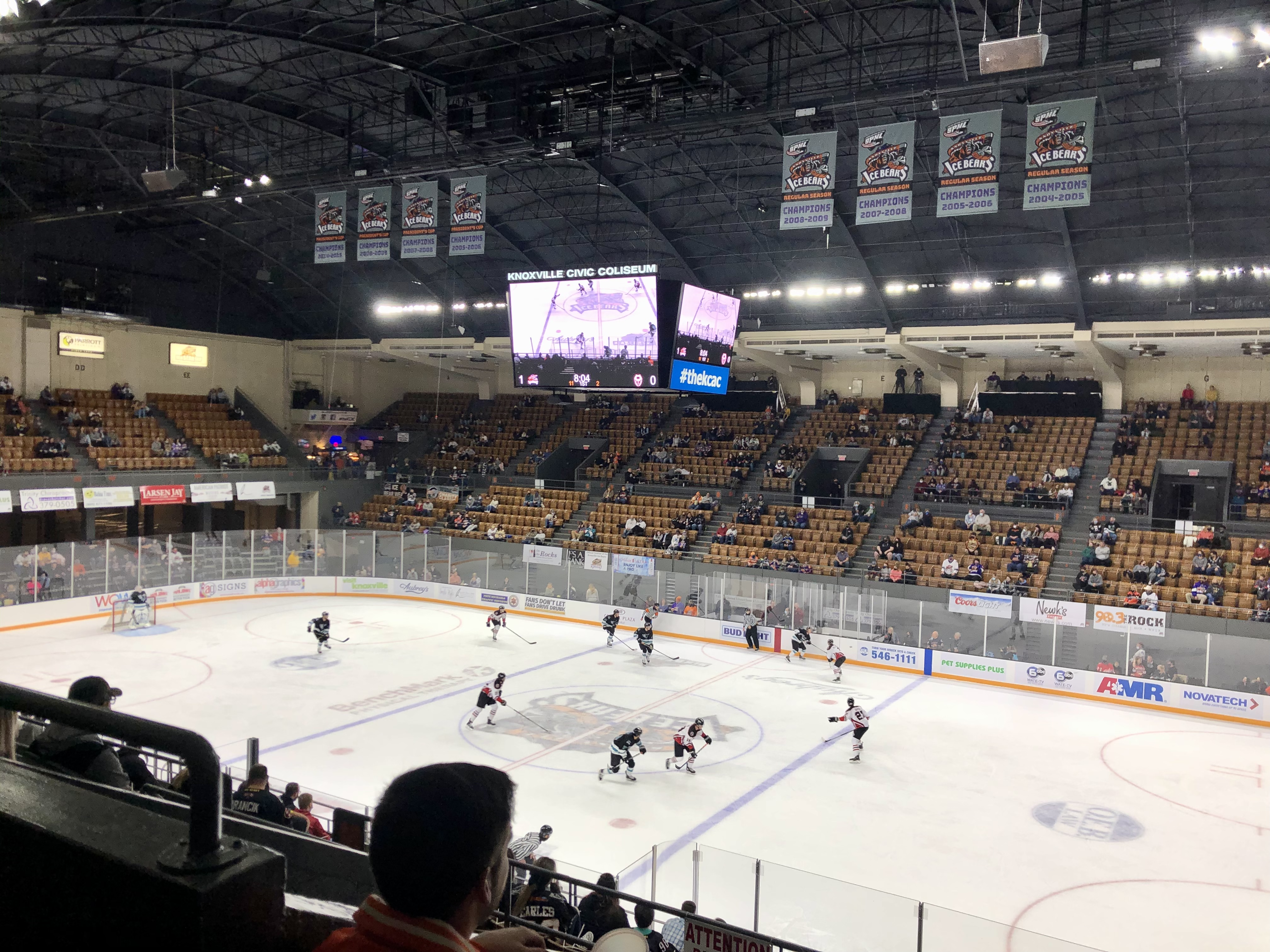
The Ice Bears in their Knoxville Cherokee throwback jerseys inside the Coliseum in February 2021.

The Knoxville Ice Bears were founded in 2002 as a charter member of the Atlantic Coast Hockey League. After finishing as runner-up to the Orlando Seals in the 2002–03 season, the Ice Bears moved to the new South East Hockey League. Again, they finished as a runner-up in the playoffs to the Huntsville Channel Cats for 2003–04. In 2004, the team again changed hockey leagues and joined the new Southern Professional Hockey League. In the SPHL's first season, the Ice Bears won the regular season championship Commissioner's Cup, but lost in the second round of the playoffs (after a first round bye) to the eventual champions, the Columbus Cottonmouths.

In 2005–06, the Ice Bears secured the Commissioner's Cup and the President's Cup by beating the Florida Seals in game four of a best-of-five series. In 2006–07, the team was eliminated in the league semifinals with two straight losses to the Fayetteville FireAntz. In 2007–08, the Ice Bears once again secured the Commissioner's Cup, now renamed the William B. Coffey Trophy. In the 2008 President's Cup playoffs, the Ice Bears won again. Rookie goalie Kirk Irving took home playoff MVP honors. The President Cup title was the Ice Bears' second in three years.

In 2008–09, the Ice Bears again won the William B. Coffey Trophy. The Ice Bears also won their second straight President's Cup.

On May 29, 2009, it was announced that head coach Scott Hillman had resigned to be the first coach of the Central Hockey League's expansion team in Independence, Missouri. Marc Rodgers took over in June 2009 after Hillman's departure.

On March 27, 2010, a line brawl erupted between the Ice Bears and rival Fayetteville FireAntz. A total of 19 players were ejected. In the third period with the Ice Bears winning 5–3, few players remained. The Ice Bears then took a 9–4 lead. The game was declared a forfeit at 10:45 of the third period, as the FireAntz had two skaters remaining after several FireAntz players intentionally drew penalties so their team would not have enough players remaining to play the rest of the game. There were a total of 26 games in suspensions handed out between all the ejected players.

In the 2009–10 season, the Ice Bears finished fourth out of seven teams. They went to the playoffs to face the FireAntz in a best-of-three series in the first round. The Ice Bears' back-to-back regular season and league championship run came to an end on April 9, 2010, when they were defeated 3–1 in game two by the eventual playoff champions, the Huntsville Havoc.

After the 2009–10 season, Ice Bears' star and SPHL all-time leading scorer Kevin Swider retired. On July 12, 2010, Swider was named Ice Bears' director of hockey operations and youth hockey school director. Swider won every scoring title from 2004 to 2010, all six years of the SPHL's existence to that point. Swider came out of retirement in the summer of 2011. The SPHL renamed the league leader in scoring trophy after Swider in 2015. In 2017, Swider was inducted into the Greater Knoxville Sports Hall of Fame for his repeated scoring titles in the SPHL.

On June 29, 2010, head coach Marc Rodgers and the Ice Bears parted ways. It was not clear if Rodgers was fired or resigned.

On August 2, 2010, the Ice Bears introduced Mike Craigen as the new head coach. Craigen, a Buckhorn, Ontario, Canada native was a former Ice Bears player from 2004 to 2008. He was a part of Knoxville's 2006 and 2008 President's Cup Championship teams. The 2010–11 season saw the Ice Bears finish sixth out of eight teams.

On October 9, 2012, the team announced that they had partnered with the NHL's Nashville Predators to host a preseason game against Huntsville, at Bridgestone Arena, the Predators home ice, on October 20. The event was free to all Ice Bears season ticket holders.

On April 18, 2015, the Ice Bears won their fourth Presidents Cup, ending a six-year drought. Ice Bears' goalie Bryan Hince took home the SPHL Playoffs MVP Award after winning his last five starts in the playoffs and allowing less than two goals per game.

On May 15, 2017, the team opted to not renew coach Mike Craigen's contract. The Ice Bears then announced Jeff Carr as their new head coach in June.

== General manager history ==
- Tommy Benizio: 2002–2003
- Preston Dixon: 2003–2006
- Mike Murray : 2006–present

== Coaching history ==
- Tony Martino: 2002–2003
- Jim Bermingham: 2003–2007
- Scott Hillman: 2007–2009
- Marc Rodgers: 2009–2010
- Mike Craigen: 2010–2017
- Jeff Carr: 2017–2022
- Brent Clarke: 2022–2023
- Andrew Harrison: 2023–2024

== Captain history ==
- Steve Zoryk: 2002–2003
- Craig Desjarlais: 2003–2004
- Todd MacIsaac: 2004–2005
- Doug Searle: 2005–2006
- Kevin Swider: 2006–2010
- Mike Bulawka: 2010–2011
- Kevin Swider: 2011–2012
- Mark Van Vliet: (co-captain) 2013–2014
- David Segal: (co-captain) 2013–2015
- Jason Price: 2015–2017
- Jake Flegel: 2017
- Evan Neugold: 2017–2018
- Lucas Bombardier: 2018–2020

== Championships ==
Year	League	Trophy
2005–06	SPHL	President's Cup
2007–08	SPHL	President's Cup
2008–09	SPHL	President's Cup
2014–15	SPHL	President's Cup

The Knoxville Ice Bears have won five William B. Coffey Trophies as the regular season champions and four President's Cup championships as the playoff champions.

== Notable former Ice Bears ==
- Kyle Bochek - Bloomington Blaze (CHL)
- Derek Foam - South Carolina Stingrays (ECHL)
- Bryan Hince - San Francisco Bulls (ECHL)
- Scott Holtzman - Ultimate Fighting Championship lightweight mixed martial artist
- Jason LePine - Iserlohn Roosters (DEL)
- Ervins Mustukovs - Sheffield Steelers (EIHL)
- Nick Niedert - Bloomington Blaze (CHL)
- Mike Towns - Idaho Steelheads (ECHL)
- Jason Weeks - Tulsa Oilers (CHL)
