= David Beauregard =

Canadian ice hockey player (born 1976)

- Born: January 28, 1976 (age 50) Montreal, Quebec, Canada
- Height: 6 ft 0 in (183 cm)
- Weight: 190 lb (86 kg; 13 st 8 lb)
- Position: Left wing
- Shot: Left
- Played for: Kentucky Thoroughblades; Manchester Phoenix; Nottingham Panthers; Kansas City Blades; HC Valpellice
- NHL draft: 271st overall, 1994; San Jose Sharks
- Playing career: 1997–2013

David-Alexandre Beauregard (born January 28, 1976) is a Canadian former professional ice hockey player who played 14 years in the minor leagues.

== Early years ==
Beauregard was born in Montreal, Quebec. When Beauregard was seven years old, he scored 230 goals in 43 games. As a junior in the Quebec Major Junior Hockey League, he scored 224 points in 190 games. The San Jose Sharks selected him in the 11th round of the 1994 NHL entry draft. While playing for the St. Hyacinthe Lasers, Beauregard lost sight in his left eye when struck by a high stick. Unable to play in the NHL since he is blind in one eye, he returned to major junior hockey several months later. That year he was awarded the organisation's Humanitarian of the Year award.

== Professional career ==
During the 1996–97 season, he had a five-game tryout with the Kentucky Thoroughblades of the American Hockey League (AHL). For the 1997–98 season, he signed a contract with the Wichita Thunder of the Central Hockey League. Several times during this season he was called up to the Kansas City Blades of the higher-level International Hockey League where he played in 15 games, but for most of the season he remained with the Thunder where he scored 42 goals and 29 assist for 71 points and the CHL Rookie of the Year award.

Beauregard's stint with the Blades marked the end of his playing time in the higher minor leagues. Bouncing around the minor leagues for the next several years, Beauregard skated in the United Hockey League (UHL) with the Muskegon Fury and Flint Generals during the 1998–99 season; and in the ECHL with the Greensboro Generals and the Charlotte Checkers during the 1999–2000 season. In the 2000–01 season he returned to the UHL, where he played two seasons with the Port Huron Border Cats, before joining the Fort Wayne Komets for the 2002–03 and 2003–04 seasons. It was during the 2003–04 season that Beauregard made a brief return to Quebec where he played 18 games in the short-lived QSMHL with the Saint-Jean Mission.

For the 2004–05 season, Beauregard continued in the UHL, for the Port Huron Beacons until the end of the season. Beauregard made another brief return to Quebec with the Sorel-Tracy Mission, suiting up just once during the 2004–05 season before following the Beacons' franchise to Roanoke for the 2005–06 season. Beauregard was the only member of the Vipers to have been selected in the NHL draft. Beauregard's successful season with the Vipers, with 76 points in 56 games, led to a late season move to the Danbury Trashers in the post-season with 23 points in 18 games.

Beauregard left the Trashers in the summer of 2006. He then spent the next two seasons with the Tulsa Oilers.

For the 2008–09 season, Beauregard moved into European hockey with the Manchester Phoenix. Beauregard was paired on a line with player-coach Tony Hand, and scored 107 points in 68 games. Beauregard was recognised by post-season awards, including the Elite Ice Hockey League (EIHL)'s Player of the Season, and selected to the All-Star First Team. Despite the on-ice success in Manchester, financial problems meant Beauregard and much of the senior squad was released.

For the 2009–10 season, Beauregardtravelled to Italy to join the HC Valpellice Bulldogs to play Serie A hockey, but before the season was done he was once again back in the CHL with the Tulsa Oilers.

For the 2010–11 season, Beauregard returned to the UK, signing to ice for the Challenge Cup champions of the EIHL – the Nottingham Panthers.

Beauregard started the 2012–13 season with the Nottingham Panthers, but finished it with the Tulsa Oilers.

== Awards ==
- 1994–95: Humanitarian of the Year (Saint-Hyacinthe Laser)
- 1997–98: CHL Rookie of the Year
- 2008–09: EIHL's Player of the Season
- 2008–09: First Team All-Star (EIHL)

== Career statistics ==
			Regular season					Playoffs				
Season	Team	League	GP	G	A	Pts	PIM	GP	G	A	Pts	PIM
1993–94	Saint-Hyacinthe Laser	QMJHL	59	21	35	56	23	—	—	—	—	—
1994–95	Saint-Hyacinthe Laser	QMJHL	37	24	16	40	22	5	1	3	4	0
1995–96	Moncton Alpines	QMJHL	41	34	27	61	54	—	—	—	—	—
1995–96	Hull Olympiques	QMJHL	15	6	6	12	2	18	7	9	16	8
1996–97	Hull Olympiques	QMJHL	17	14	6	20	8	—	—	—	—	—
1996–97	Shawinigan Cataractes	QMJHL	21	13	22	35	24	7	3	4	7	12
1996–97	Kentucky Thoroughblades	AHL	5	0	3	3	0	—	—	—	—	—
1997–98	Kansas City Blades	IHL	15	2	2	4	6	—	—	—	—	—
1997–98	Wichita Thunder	CHL	57	42	29	71	86	13	3	5	8	31
1998–99	Muskegon Fury	UHL	54	31	24	55	30	—	—	—	—	—
1998–99	Flint Generals	UHL	18	18	8	26	10	12	5	3	8	31
1999–2000	Greensboro Generals	ECHL	17	9	7	16	26	—	—	—	—	—
1999–2000	Charlotte Checkers	ECHL	53	20	20	40	22	—	—	—	—	—
2000–01	Port Huron Border Cats	UHL	56	33	30	63	31	—	—	—	—	—
2001–02	Port Huron Border Cats	UHL	69	50	35	85	44	—	—	—	—	—
2002–03	Fort Wayne Komets	UHL	75	30	17	47	46	12	4	5	9	2
2003–04	Saint-Jean Mission	QSPHL	18	17	14	31	10	—	—	—	—	—
2003–04	Fort Wayne Komets	UHL	57	39	30	69	48	7	1	1	2	0
2004–05	Port Huron Beacons	UHL	66	47	29	76	57	—	—	—	—	—
2004–05	Sorel-Tracy Mission	LNAH	1	2	1	3	0	—	—	—	—	—
2005–06	Roanoke Valley Vipers	UHL	56	33	43	76	69	—	—	—	—	—
2005–06	Danbury Trashers	UHL	14	8	9	17	6	18	12	11	23	12
2006–07	Tulsa Oilers	CHL	64	39	32	71	50	—	—	—	—	—
2007–08	Tulsa Oilers	CHL	63	35	36	71	40	—	—	—	—	—
2008–09	Manchester Phoenix	EIHL	54	44	35	79	30	2	1	1	2	2
2009–10	HC Valpellice	Serie A	24	6	15	21	20	—	—	—	—	—
2009–10	Tulsa Oilers	CHL	16	3	3	6	8	—	—	—	—	—
2010–11	Nottingham Panthers	EIHL	62	29	33	62	64	4	5	2	7	4
2011–12	Nottingham Panthers	EIHL	54	39	29	68	48	1	0	1	1	0
2012–13	Nottingham Panthers	EIHL	5	1	4	5	2	—	—	—	—	—
2012–13	Tulsa Oilers	CHL	26	4	12	16	12	—	—	—	—	—
Professional totals			911	540	452	992	703	68	31	28	59	63
