= Mark Reeds =

Canadian ice hockey player

- Born: January 24, 1960 Toronto, Ontario, Canada
- Died: April 14, 2015 (aged 55) Ottawa, Ontario, Canada
- Height: 5 ft 10 in (178 cm)
- Weight: 178 lb (81 kg; 12 st 10 lb)
- Position: Right wing
- Shot: Right
- Played for: St. Louis Blues; Hartford Whalers
- NHL draft: 86th overall, 1979; St. Louis Blues
- Playing career: 1981–1989

Mark Allen Reeds (January 24, 1960 – April 14, 2015) was a Canadian professional ice hockey coach and a former player who had played in the National Hockey League (NHL) between 1981 and 1989. He was born in Toronto, Ontario, but grew up in Burlington, Ontario.

Reeds died of esophageal cancer while serving as an assistant coach for the Ottawa Senators of the NHL on April 14, 2015.

== Playing career ==
Reeds began his junior career with the Toronto Marlboros of the Ontario Major Junior Hockey League (OMJHL), playing 18 games with them in 1976–77. He then moved to the Peterborough Petes for the remainder of his junior career, playing with the club from 1977 to 1980. He was drafted by the St. Louis Blues in the fifth round of the 1979 NHL entry draft.

Reeds spent the entire 1980–81 season with the Salt Lake Golden Eagles of the Central Hockey League (CHL), and a majority of the 1981–82 with them. Reeds got a taste of NHL action with the Blues, appearing in nine regular season games with St. Louis, then playing in ten more in the NHL playoffs. He again split the 1982–83 season between the Golden Eagles and Blues before staying in St. Louis exclusively in 1983–84. On October 5, 1987, the Blues traded Reeds to the Hartford Whalers. He only appeared in 38 games with the Whalers due to injuries in 1987–88, and split the 1988–89 season between Hartford and the Binghamton Whalers of the American Hockey League (AHL). Reeds played in Italy from 1989 to 1991 before returning to North America, and in 1992–93, Reeds saw his last action as a player, suiting up for 16 games with the Peoria Rivermen of the International Hockey League (IHL). Overall, he appeared in 365 NHL games, scoring 45 goals and 114 assists for a total of 159 points. He also appeared in 53 NHL playoff games, earning 17 points.

== Coaching career ==
=== Minor leagues ===
Following his playing career, he became a coach, serving as an assistant coach with the IHL's Peoria Rivermen from 1992 to 1996. The Rivermen moved to the ECHL for the 1996–97 season, and Reeds was elevated to head coach, leading the club to a 43–21–6 record. He spent the next two seasons in Peoria before moving to the United Hockey League's Missouri River Otters, leading the expansion club to the playoffs in its first season, 1999–2000. He led the Otters to the playoffs in each of his four seasons, then moved to the Kalamazoo Wings of the UHL, leading the squad to the 2006 Colonial Cup Championship, 4 games to 1 over Danbury in the finals. The Wings returned to the league's final series in 2007, but fell to the Rockford IceHogs in seven games. Reeds was hired as the head coach of the Owen Sound Attack of the Ontario Hockey League in July 2007.

=== Owen Sound Attack ===
In his first season with the Attack in 2007–08, the rebuilding club struggled, failing to make the playoffs. Owen Sound improved in 2008–09, as they earned 20 more points than the previous season, and made the playoffs, where they went out in the first round. The Attack then struggled in 2009–10, missing the playoffs for the second time in three seasons. In 2010–11, Owen Sound, predicted to be a border-line playoff team, wound up having the best record in the Western Conference. In the playoffs, the Attack easily defeated the London Knights, Plymouth Whalers and Windsor Spitfires to make the J. Ross Robertson Cup finals. In the finals, the Attack upset the heavily-favoured Mississauga St. Michael's Majors in seven games to represent the OHL in the 2011 Memorial Cup. After shutting out the Kootenay Ice 5–0 in their first game, injuries caught up with the Attack, as they lost their next two round-robin games, followed by a 7–3 loss to Kootenay in a tie-breaker, to be eliminated from the tournament.

=== Ottawa Senators ===
On June 23, 2011, newly-hired Ottawa Senators head coach Paul MacLean named Reeds as one of his assistant coaches.

== Illness and death ==
In March 2015, the Senators announced that Reeds had been diagnosed with an inoperable form of cancer. Reeds died on April 14, 2015, at the age of 55 from esophageal cancer; having been hospitalized with pneumonia, and is survived by wife Mary and two children.

During the 2015 Stanley Cup Playoffs, both the Montreal Canadiens and Senators held moments of silence in Reeds' memory.

== Career statistics ==
=== Regular season and playoffs ===
			Regular season					Playoffs
Season	Team	League	GP	G	A	Pts	PIM	GP	G	A	Pts	PIM
1976–77	Toronto Marlboros	OMJHL	18	6	7	13	6	—	—	—	—	—
1977–78	Peterborough Petes	OMJHL	68	11	27	38	67	8	1	1	2	12
1978–79	Peterborough Petes	OMJHL	66	25	25	50	96	11	0	5	5	19
1979–80	Peterborough Petes	OMJHL	54	34	45	79	51	14	9	10	19	19
1980–81	Salt Lake Golden Eagles	CHL	74	15	45	60	81	17	5	8	13	28
1981–82	Salt Lake Golden Eagles	CHL	59	22	24	46	55	—	—	—	—	—
1981–82	St. Louis Blues	NHL	9	1	3	4	0	10	0	1	1	2
1982–83	Salt Lake Golden Eagles	CHL	55	16	26	42	32	—	—	—	—	—
1982–83	St. Louis Blues	NHL	20	5	14	19	6	4	1	0	1	2
1983–84	St. Louis Blues	NHL	65	11	14	25	23	11	3	3	6	15
1984–85	St. Louis Blues	NHL	80	9	30	39	25	3	0	0	0	0
1985–86	St. Louis Blues	NHL	78	10	28	38	28	19	4	4	8	2
1986–87	St. Louis Blues	NHL	68	9	16	25	16	6	0	1	1	2
1987–88	Hartford Whalers	NHL	38	0	7	7	31	—	—	—	—	—
1988–89	Binghamton Whalers	AHL	69	26	34	60	18	—	—	—	—	—
1988–89	Hartford Whalers	NHL	7	0	2	2	6	—	—	—	—	—
1989–90	HC Fiemme Cavalese	ITA	44	47	84	131	12	—	—	—	—	—
1990–91	HC Fiemme Cavalese	ITA	36	8	47	55	18	—	—	—	—	—
1992–93	Peoria Rivermen	IHL	16	4	2	6	8	1	0	0	0	0
NHL totals			365	45	114	159	135	53	8	9	17	23

=== International ===
Year	Team	Event	GP	G	A	Pts	PIM
1980	Canada	WJC	5	1	0	1	2
Junior totals			5	1	0	1	2

=== Coaching record ===
Team	Year	Regular season							Postseason
Team	Year	G	W	L	T	OTL	Pts	Finish	Result
PEO	1996–97	70	43	21	6	-	92	2nd in North	Lost in Third round
PEO	1997–98	70	44	19	7	-	95	1st in Northwest	Lost in First round
PEO	1998–99	70	39	25	6	-	84	2nd in Northwest	Lost in Second round
MRO	1999–00	74	39	29	-	6	84	2nd in Western	Lost in First round
MRO	2000–01	74	41	24	-	9	91	2nd in Western	Lost in Second round
MRO	2001–02	74	41	24	-	9	91	3rd in Western	Lost in First round
MRO	2002–03	76	38	28	-	10	86	2nd in Western	Lost in First round
KAL	2003–04	76	45	22	-	9	99	4th in Western	Lost in First round
KAL	2004–05	80	50	24	-	6	106	2nd in Central	Lost in First round
KAL	2005–06	76	52	17	-	7	111	1st in Central	Won Colonial Cup
KAL	2006–07	76	47	23	-	6	100	2nd in Eastern	Lost in Finals
OS	2007–08	68	20	41	-	7	47	4th in Midwest	Missed Playoffs
OS	2008–09	68	26	27	-	15	67	4th in Midwest	Lost in First round
OS	2009–10	68	27	33	-	8	62	5th in Midwest	Missed Playoffs
OS	2010–11	68	46	17	-	5	97	1st in Midwest	Won J. Ross Robertson Cup
