= Jeff Brown (ice hockey, born 1978) =

Canadian ice hockey player

- Born: April 24, 1978 (age 48) Mississauga, Ontario, Canada
- Height: 6 ft 1 in (185 cm)
- Weight: 232 lb (105 kg; 16 st 8 lb)
- Position: Defence
- Shot: Right
- Played for: Hartford Wolf Pack; San Antonio Rampage
- NHL draft: 22nd overall, 1996; New York Rangers
- Playing career: 1998–2009

Jeff Brown (born April 24, 1978) is a Canadian former professional ice hockey defenceman. He was drafted in the first round, twenty-second overall, of the 1996 NHL entry draft by the New York Rangers, but never played a game in the NHL.

== Career statistics ==
			Regular season					Playoffs
Season	Team	League	GP	G	A	Pts	PIM	GP	G	A	Pts	PIM
1993–94	Thornhill Islanders	MetJHL	47	6	18	24	96	—	—	—	—	—
1994–95	Sarnia Sting	OHL	58	2	14	16	52	4	0	2	2	2
1995–96	Sarnia Sting	OHL	65	8	20	28	111	10	1	2	3	12
1996–97	Sarnia Sting	OHL	35	5	14	19	60	—	—	—	—	—
1996–97	London Knights	OHL	28	1	17	18	32	—	—	—	—	—
1997–98	London Knights	OHL	63	12	42	54	96	15	1	4	5	26
1998–99	Canada	Intl	13	0	2	2	8	—	—	—	—	—
1998–99	Hartford Wolf Pack	AHL	9	0	2	2	21	—	—	—	—	—
1998–99	Charlotte Checkers	ECHL	12	1	2	3	20	—	—	—	—	—
1999–2000	Charlotte Checkers	ECHL	51	7	18	25	107	—	—	—	—	—
1999–2000	Hartford Wolf Pack	AHL	6	0	0	0	2	—	—	—	—	—
2000–01	New Haven Knights	UHL	67	7	16	23	116	8	1	2	3	8
2000–01	Hartford Wolf Pack	AHL	3	0	0	0	2	—	—	—	—	—
2001–02	Sheffield Steelers	BISL	48	3	11	14	84	8	0	0	0	6
2002–03	Sheffield Steelers	BISL	32	2	9	11	34	16	2	3	5	20
2003–04	Cardiff Devils	EIHL	56	6	19	25	110	2	0	0	0	4
2004–05	Texas Wildcatters	ECHL	11	0	3	3	23	—	—	—	—	—
2004–05	San Antonio Rampage	AHL	54	0	4	4	46	—	—	—	—	—
2005–06	Port Huron Flags	UHL	21	1	7	8	27	—	—	—	—	—
2005–06	Missouri River Otters	UHL	52	4	21	25	95	—	—	—	—	—
2006–07	Kalamazoo Wings	UHL	66	5	32	37	123	20	2	6	8	41
2007–08	Brantford Blast	MLH	5	1	1	2	10	10	2	7	9	16
2007–08	Brantford Blast	AC	—	—	—	—	—	5	1	1	2	6
2008–09	Brantford Blast	MLH	24	9	14	23	47	—	—	—	—	—
AHL totals			72	0	6	6	71	—	—	—	—	—

Preceded by Dan Cloutier	New York Rangers first-round draft pick 1996	Succeeded by Stefan Cherneski
