= Lonnie Loach =

Canadian ice hockey player (1968–2025)

- Born: April 14, 1968 New Liskeard, Ontario, Canada
- Died: September 1, 2025 (aged 57) Ontario, Canada
- Height: 5 ft 10 in (178 cm)
- Weight: 185 lb (84 kg; 13 st 3 lb)
- Position: Left wing
- Shot: Left
- Played for: Ottawa Senators; Los Angeles Kings; Mighty Ducks of Anaheim
- NHL draft: 98th overall, 1986; Chicago Blackhawks
- Playing career: 1988–2006

Lonnie Temple Loach (April 14, 1968 – September 1, 2025) was a Canadian professional ice hockey player. Loach spent the majority of his career in the International Hockey League (IHL) but also played briefly in the National Hockey League (NHL) with the Ottawa Senators, Los Angeles Kings, and Mighty Ducks of Anaheim. He played left wing and shot left-handed. He appeared in 1,000 professional hockey games and won the Memorial Cup of the Canadian Hockey League, the Calder Cup of the American Hockey League and was on the runner up teams for both the Turner Cup of the IHL and Stanley Cup and the NHL.

== Playing career ==
=== Amateur career ===
Loach was selected by the Guelph Platers of the Ontario Hockey League (OHL) in the first round, third overall, in the 1985 OHL Priority Draft. He joined the Platers for the 1985–86 season, playing in 65 games, scoring 45 goals and 83 points. He was named the OHL's Rookie of the Year. Coached by Jacques Martin, the Platers made the OHL playoffs and Loach played in 20 games tallying seven goals and 15 points as Guelph went all to the way to the final, and won the J. Ross Robertson Cup as league champions.

The Platers were invited to the 1986 Memorial Cup tournament, along with the Hull Olympiques of the Quebec Major Junior Hockey League, the Kamloops Blazers of the Western Hockey League (WHL) and host Portland Winterhawks, also of the WHL. The Platers faced the Olympiques in the final. Loach scored a goal in the 6–2 victory over Hull, winning the Memorial Cup. Loach returned to the Platers for 1986–87 season and played in 56 games registering 31 goals and 55 points. He missed time with a knee injury in November 1986. The Platers made the playoffs again that season and Loach appeared in five games, marking two goals and one assist for three points.

He rejoined the Platers for his final year of junior hockey during the 1987–88 season, playing in 66 games, scoring 43 goals and 92 points. He set a new franchise record for most goals scored for the Guelph Platers with his 83rd career goal in November, surpassing the previous tally of 82 set by Kirk Muller and Keith Miller. On January 6, 1988, he scored his 100th and 101st career goals for the Platers in a loss to the Hamilton Steelhawks. Loach was the first player to score 100 goals for the team. However, the Platers failed to make the playoffs.

=== Professional career ===
==== Chicago Blackhawks ====
Loach was drafted by the Chicago Blackhawks of the National Hockey League (NHL) in the fifth round, 98th overall in the 1986 NHL entry draft. He joined the Blackhawks after his junior career was finished and was assigned to Chicago's International Hockey League (IHL) affiliate, the Saginaw Hawks coached by Darryl Sutter, to begin the 1988–89 season. In January 1989 his assignment was swapped to the Flint Spirits of the IHL in exchange for goaltender Ray LeBlanc, with Loach returning to Saginaw at the end of the season. He played in 32 games with Saginaw, scoring seven goals and 13 points. Traded for the popular LeBlanc, Loach was at first resented by the Flint fan base as not equal quality as a trade return. However, coached by Don Waddell, Loach went on a scoring streak, adding 37 points in the following 31 games and earning IHL Player of the Week honours in March. While playing on a line with Michel Mongeau and Yves Héroux, he put up 22 goals and 48 points in 41 games with Flint. The following season, the Blackhawks assigned Loach to their new IHL affiliate team, the Indianapolis Ice, coached by Darryl Sutter. He played three games with the Ice, registering one assist. In late November 1989, Loach was loaned to the Canadian National Team for 30 days, during which he appeared in nine games, scoring three goals and four points. After returning from the national team loan, there were no spots open on the Ice and Loach was loaned to the Fort Wayne Komets of the IHL. He played in 54 games with the Komets, scoring 15 goals and 48 points.

==== Turner and Calder cups ====
A free agent at season's end he returned to Fort Wayne for the 1990–91 season. While playing on a line with Bruce Boudreau and John Anderson, Loach led the IHL with 131 points in 81 games. Loach helped lead the Komets to the Turner Cup final, but ultimately lost to the Peoria Rivermen in six games. At the end of the season, Loach was named an IHL Second Team All-Star and awarded the Leo P. Lamoureux Memorial Trophy as the league's leading scorer.

In the 1991 offseason Loach signed as a free agent with the Detroit Red Wings and was assigned to their American Hockey League (AHL) affiliate, the Adirondack Red Wings in September. He spent one year with Adirondack scoring 86 points in 67 games during the 1991–92 season. He was leading the league in scoring in December with 18 goals and 40 points when he suffered a broken thumb that knocked him from the lineup. (Note: Also sometimes reported as a broken wrist.) He returned to the lineup on January 8, 1992, after missing 13 games. Adirondack won the Calder Cup that season.

==== Expansion and Los Angeles Kings ====
The NHL expanded during the 1992 offseason, adding two teams, the Ottawa Senators and Tampa Bay Lightning. Detroit left Loach exposed in the 1992 NHL expansion draft and he was selected by the Senators. Loach was one of the players selected as part of the Senators' strategy of picking young, talented players who had not succeeded with their original teams. The 1992–93 NHL season saw Loach finally make his NHL debut. On October 12, 1992, Loach made his first NHL appearance in a 6–3 loss to the Boston Bruins. He appeared in three games with the Senators early in the season. However, after going scoreless, the Senators attempted to send him to their AHL affiliate, the New Haven Senators, exposing him to waivers in late October. Loach was quickly picked up by the Los Angeles Kings however, and earned a spot on the Kings roster. He had a connection to coach Barry Melrose, for whom he played for in Adirondack. He made his Los Angeles debut on October 31 in a 7–1 victory over the Hartford Whalers, inserted into the lineup along with forward Robert Lang and defenceman Peter Ahola, replacing the scratched forwards Dave Taylor, Pat Conacher, and Bob Kudelski. Loach earned his first NHL point in the game, an assist on Tomas Sandström's goal in the third period. He scored his first NHL goal on November 14 against Ron Tugnutt, assisted by defenceman Charlie Huddy and forward Tony Granato, in the third period of an 6–2 win over the Edmonton Oilers. He registered his first multi-point NHL game on December 5, assisting on Huddy's first period goal and scoring his own in the third period in a 7–3 win over the Whalers.

Loach played in 50 games with the Kings, scoring ten goals and 23 points, often playing on a line with fellow rookies Jim Hiller and Lang. He suffered a broken thumb after a collision with defenceman Huddy in practice, missing eleven games. Loach was briefly assigned to the Kings' IHL affiliate, the Phoenix Roadrunners, and was recalled at the end of December. He played in four games with the Roadrunners, scoring two goals and five points. In his second game after his return on January 19, 1993, Loach ended up on a line with Jari Kurri and Luc Robitaille, and the three accounted for four goals and nine points that night in a 5–4 victory over the Edmonton Oilers, with Loach notching one goal and two assists. The Kings made 1993 Stanley Cup playoffs and made it all the way to the Stanley Cup finals, but Loach did not see any playing time. After injuries to Huddy and Taylor, Loach and Jimmy Carson were inserted into the lineup for Game 4 of the Stanley Cup finals versus the Montreal Canadiens, his only NHL playoff game.

In the 1993 offseason, the NHL expanded again, and Loach was exposed in the 1993 NHL expansion draft by Los Angeles. He was claimed again, this time by the Mighty Ducks of Anaheim. He was unable to crack the Mighty Ducks roster for the 1993–94 season, and was assigned to Anaheim's IHL affiliate, the San Diego Gulls. He spent the majority of the year with the Gulls, playing in 74 games, scoring 42 goals and 91 points. Loach was recalled in February 1994 by the Mighty Ducks and made his NHL season debut on February 16 against the Philadelphia Flyers, centering the fourth line between Todd Ewen and Stu Grimson. He played in three games with the Mighty Ducks, going scoreless, with his last game being a 4–1 loss to the St. Louis Blues on February 20. He was replaced in the lineup for the newly acquired Stéphan Lebeau. Loach was returned to San Diego in March. This would be the last time he would play in the NHL. He finished the season as the Gulls most valuable player and led the team in scoring.

==== Minor leagues ====
Having played out his option with the Mighty Ducks, Anaheim's general manager Jack Ferreira declined to offer Loach another contract at the end of the 1993–94 season. A free agent, he signed a three-year contract to return to San Diego in August 1994. During the 1994–95 season he played in 13 games with San Diego, scoring three goals and 13 points before being traded to the Detroit Vipers in November for Ron Wilson. He finished the season with 32 goals and 75 points in 64 games with Detroit, leading the team in scoring. He was selected to play in the 1995 IHL All-Star Game for Detroit along with teammates Jason Woolley, Gord Hynes and Rick Knickle. He also added three points in nine playoff games for the Vipers. He missed two weeks during the playoffs after suffering a compound fracture in his left hand, requiring surgery. He returned to the Vipers for the 1995–96 season, playing in 79 games, scoring 35 goals and 81 points. He was named to play in the 1996 IHL All-Star Game, representing the Eastern Conference. He played in eleven playoff games, adding one goal and six points.

In August 1996, Loach was traded by the Vipers to the San Antonio Dragons of the IHL in exchange for his former linemate Michel Mongeau. In the 1996–97 season, Loach played in 70 games for the Dragons, registering 24 goals and 61 points. Loach represented the Dragons at the 1997 IHL All-Star Game and was named one of the starters for the Western Conference. Loach scored a pair of goals during the All-Star Game as the Western Conference won it 6–4. Loach appeared in nine playoff games for the Dragons, scoring one goal and four points.

For the 1997–98 season, Loach signed overseas with Zurich SC. He played in 15 games with Zurich, registering two goals and seven points before returning to North America, re-signing with the Dragons in November. He played in 52 games with the Dragons, scoring seven goals and 36 points. Loach split the 1998–99 season between three teams, beginning with HK Ljubljana Olimpija of Alpenliga in Europe, where he appeared in 11 games, registering four goals and 14 points. He returned to the IHL with the Long Beach Ice Dogs, playing in 30 games, scoring 12 goals and 21 points before being traded to the Kansas City Blades for future considerations as the Ice Dogs moved to unload Loach's contract once they became fully healthy. He finished the season with nine goals and 14 points in 22 games with the Blades and added one goal in three playoff games.

Loach then played from the 1999–2000 season until the 2002–03 season with the Missouri River Otters of the United Hockey League (UHL). Over four seasons he scored 310 points in 238 games with the River Otters. In his first season, he made a single appearance with the Chicago Wolves of the AHL, but played in 8 games during the 2000 Calder Cup playoffs, during which the Wolves won the Calder Cup. He also made two appearances for the Wolves during the 2001 Calder Cup playoffs. During the 2002–03 season Loach also made an appearance with the Los Angeles Kings minor league affiliate Manchester Monarchs of the AHL, playing three games. Loach was named the league's most sportsmanlike player for the 2002–03 season. Loach retired from hockey following the 2002–03 season. Loach came out of retirement for the 2005–06 season with the River Otters, skating in 21 games with the team and appearing in his 1,000th professional hockey game, before retiring again in 2006.

== Coaching career ==
For the 2003–04 season Loach was hired as the head coach of the River Otters in July. During the season, he underwent emergency brain surgery in December 2003. He coached the team for the majority of the year, but departed for personal reasons after 70 games and a 16–47–7 record, during which the team set a new record for the worst start in league history, going 0–11–2. He was replaced by his assistant, John Wensink.

== Personal life and death ==
After leaving coaching, Loach worked in the auto industry in the St. Louis, Missouri area. He was married with two sons. He had his jersey retired by the River Otters, the only player to have his number retired by the team.

For several years during the mid-1990s, Loach ran his own hockey school for children in Northern Ontario. He started this while playing for the Detroit Vipers and Red Wing Keith Primeau would participate. Loach's ran for three years and even spawned one professional NHL hockey player, fellow Hockey Heritage North Alumni, Kurtis McLean. Loach also helped raise money for local charities in Northern Ontario by lending his services to charity hockey tournaments. One in particular is the Canadian Tire Rino Robazza Memorial Hockey tournament.

Loach died from cancer at his home in Ontario, on September 1, 2025, at the age of 57.

== Career statistics ==
=== Regular season and playoffs ===
			Regular season					Playoffs
Season	Team	League	GP	G	A	Pts	PIM	GP	G	A	Pts	PIM
1982–83	New Liskeard Cubs U18 AAA	GNML	1	1	0	1	2	—	—	—	—	—
1983–84	New Liskeard Cubs U18 AAA	GNML	30	17	26	43	39	—	—	—	—	—
1983–84	Haileybury 54's	NOJHL	2	0	0	0	0	—	—	—	—	—
1984–85	St. Marys Lincolns	WOHL	44	26	36	62	113	—	—	—	—	—
1985–86	Guelph Platers	OHL	65	41	42	83	63	20	7	8	15	16
1986–87	Guelph Platers	OHL	56	31	24	55	42	5	2	1	3	2
1987–88	Guelph Platers	OHL	66	43	49	92	75	—	—	—	—	—
1988–89	Saginaw Hawks	IHL	32	7	6	13	27	—	—	—	—	—
1988–89	Flint Spirits	IHL	42	22	26	48	30	—	—	—	—	—
1989–90	Indianapolis Ice	IHL	3	0	1	1	0	—	—	—	—	—
1989–90	Fort Wayne Komets	IHL	54	15	33	48	40	5	4	2	6	15
1989–90	Canadian National Team	Intl	9	3	1	4	2	—	—	—	—	—
1990–91	Fort Wayne Komets	IHL	81	55	76	131	45	19	5	11	16	13
1991–92	Adirondack Red Wings	AHL	67	37	49	86	69	19	13	4	17	10
1992–93	Ottawa Senators	NHL	3	0	0	0	0	—	—	—	—	—
1992–93	Los Angeles Kings	NHL	50	10	13	23	27	1	0	0	0	0
1992–93	Phoenix Roadrunners	IHL	4	2	3	5	10	—	—	—	—	—
1993–94	Mighty Ducks of Anaheim	NHL	3	0	0	0	0	—	—	—	—	—
1993–94	San Diego Gulls	IHL	74	42	49	91	65	9	4	10	14	6
1994–95	San Diego Gulls	IHL	13	3	10	13	21	—	—	—	—	—
1994–95	Detroit Vipers	IHL	64	32	43	75	45	3	2	1	3	2
1995–96	Detroit Vipers	IHL	79	35	51	86	75	11	1	5	6	8
1996–97	San Antonio Dragons	IHL	70	24	37	61	45	9	1	3	4	10
1997–98	ZSC Lions	NLA	15	1	5	6	6	—	—	—	—	—
1997–98	San Antonio Dragons	IHL	52	7	29	36	22	—	—	—	—	—
1998–99	Long Beach Ice Dogs	IHL	30	12	9	21	18	—	—	—	—	—
1998–99	Kansas City Blades	IHL	22	9	5	14	6	3	1	0	1	0
1998–99	Olimpija Ljubljana	SLO	11	4	10	14	12	—	—	—	—	—
1999–00	Missouri River Otters	UHL	58	29	56	85	20	3	3	2	5	2
1999–00	Chicago Wolves	IHL	1	0	0	0	0	8	0	3	3	0
2000–01	Missouri River Otters	UHL	56	27	37	64	29	4	2	6	8	2
2000–01	Chicago Wolves	IHL	—	—	—	—	—	2	0	0	0	0
2001–02	Missouri River Otters	UHL	56	35	49	84	26	4	3	2	5	2
2002–03	Missouri River Otters	UHL	69	29	48	77	48	3	0	1	1	0
2002–03	Manchester Monarchs	AHL	3	0	1	1	0	—	—	—	—	—
IHL totals			621	265	378	643	449	69	18	35	53	54
NHL totals			56	10	13	23	29	1	0	0	0	0

== Coaching statistics ==
Year	Team	Regular season						Postseason		
Year	Team	G	W	L	T	Pts	Win %	W	L	Result
2003–04	Missouri River Otters	70	16	47	7	42	0.279	—N/a	—N/a	Did not make playoffs

== Awards and honours ==
Award	Year
OHL Rookie of the Year	1986
IHL Second All-Star Team	1991
Leo P. Lamoureux Memorial Trophy	1991
