= Daniel Berthiaume =

Canadian ice hockey player (born 1966)

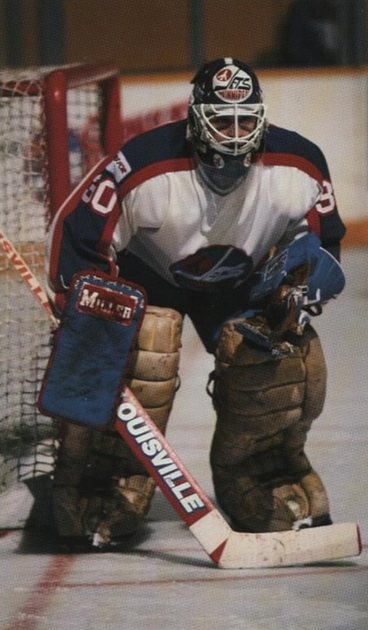
- Born: January 26, 1966 (age 60) Longueuil, Quebec, Canada
- Height: 5 ft 9 in (175 cm)
- Weight: 170 lb (77 kg; 12 st 2 lb)
- Position: Goaltender
- Caught: Left
- Played for: Winnipeg Jets; Minnesota North Stars; Los Angeles Kings; Boston Bruins; Ottawa Senators
- NHL draft: 60th overall, 1985; Winnipeg Jets
- Playing career: 1986–2005

Daniel J. Berthiaume (born January 26, 1966) is a Canadian former professional ice hockey player who played goaltender for six seasons in the National Hockey League (NHL) with the Winnipeg Jets, Minnesota North Stars, Los Angeles Kings, Boston Bruins, and Ottawa Senators, before finishing his career in the minor leagues. He was also a former professional roller hockey player. After his retirement from playing hockey, he became a coach within the sport.

== Playing career ==
=== Amateur ===
Known as "The Bandit" during his hockey career, Berthiaume was selected in the fifth round of the Quebec Major Junior Hockey League (QMJHL)'s 1983 amateur draft by the Drummondville Voltigeurs. He made his major junior hockey debut in the 1983–84 season and made 23 appearances, with a record of 12 wins and 13 losses (12–13–0), a goals against average (GAA) of 5.03 and a save percentage of 0.863. (Note: Elite Prospects has Berthiaume's GAA as 5.11 for the 1983–84 season.) Sharing the net with Judes Labillois, he grew frustrated with his lack of playing time and left the team on multiple occasions. The Voltigeurs made the playoffs and advanced to the second round where they were eliminated by Mario Lemieux and the Laval Voisins. Berthiaume made three playoff appearances, going 0–2–0, with a GAA of 6.18 and a save percentage of 0.828.

He returned to Drummondville for the 1984–85 season and played in three games with a record of 1–2–0 and a GAA of 5.70, before being traded to the Chicoutimi Saguenéens on October 14, 1984 in exchange for winger Simon Massie. In 56 games with Chicoutimi, he had a record of 40–11–2, a GAA of 3.75 and a save percentage of 0.885, with two shutouts. He was awarded the Jacques Plante Memorial Trophy as the league's goaltender with the best GAA, the first recipient in Saguenéens franchise history and the Michel Brière Memorial Trophy as the league's most valuable player. He was also named to the QMJHL's First All-Star Team. In the playoffs, Chicoutimi made it to the league championship where they were beat by the Verdun Junior Canadiens. In 14 playoff games, he had a record of 8–6–0, with a GAA of 3.97 and a save percentage of 0.888. In his first full season with Chicoutimi in 1985–86 season he had a record of 34–27–3 with one shutout, a GAA of 4.59 and a save percentage of .874. In January 1986, he demanded to be traded after the head coach of the Saguenéens, Mario Bazinet, was dismissed. He remained with the team, and in the playoffs, he made eight appearances, going 4–5–0, with a GAA of 3.83 and a save percentage of 0.900, ultimately being eliminated by his former team, the Voltigeurs.

=== Professional ===
==== Winnipeg Jets ====
Berthiaume was selected in the third round, 60th overall, by the Winnipeg Jets of the National Hockey League (NHL) in the 1985 NHL entry draft. After selecting him, Jets general manager John Ferguson compared Berthiaume to future Hall of Fame goaltender Patrick Roy. Berthiaume signed with Winnipeg in August 1985. He attended the Jets training camp, but was returned to Chicoutimi in September. After his junior team was eliminated in the QMJHL playoffs, he joined the Jets and made his NHL debut that spring during the 1986 Stanley Cup playoffs. The Jets faced the Calgary Flames in the first round. Veteran goaltender Dan Bouchard started game one but was relieved by Brian Hayward after giving up five goals. Hayward started game two but after surrendering six goals, he was yanked, and Marc Behrend finished the game. For game three, with the Jets on the brink of elimination, Berthiaume made his NHL debut and dazzled, making 39 saves before ultimately losing in overtime when Lanny McDonald found the back of the net.

In the offseason, the Jets acquired goaltender Steve Penney from the Montreal Canadiens in exchange for Hayward. To start the season, Berthiaume was assigned to Winnipeg's American Hockey League (AHL) affiliate, the Sherbrooke Canadiens after struggling in training camp. In October, the Jets bought out Bouchard's contract leaving Penney, Behrend, and Eldon "Pokey" Reddick in the Jets' crease. In seven games in the AHL, Berthiaume had a record of 4–3–0, a 3.29 GAA and a save percentage of 0.883. He was recalled on November 3 after Penney suffered an injury. He got into his first regular season game on November 4, a 6–3 victory over the Quebec Nordiques. He recorded his first NHL shutout in his second game on November 7, keeping the St. Louis Blues scoreless in a 2–0 win. As a result of Reddick's play, Behrend was sent to Sherbrooke and Penney remained out with injury, leaving Berthiaume and fellow rookie Reddick to seize the job and form a solid platoon. Berthiaume posted an impressive 18–7–3 record in 31 games during his rookie NHL season of 1986–87, with a 3.18 GAA and a 0.885 save percentage. The Jets made the 1987 Stanley Cup playoffs and faced the Flames in the first round for the second consecutive year. Berthiaume started every single game in the series, which the Jets went on to win. They faced the top team in the league, the Edmonton Oilers led by Wayne Gretzky, in the second round. Berthiaume started the first game of the series but did not play again until the final game of the series, which the Oilers won. In eight playoff games, Berthiaume went 4–4–0, with a GAA of 2.88 and a save percentage of .900.

During his sophomore season in the NHL in 1987–88, Berthiaume shared the crease with Reddick after Penney was assigned to Winnipeg's new AHL affiliate, the Moncton Hawks. In the second half of the season, he took on a larger role, starting the majority of the games. The Jets qualified for the 1988 Stanley Cup playoffs and faced Edmonton in the first round. Berthiaume started all five games of the series as the Jets were eliminated by the Oilers. He posted a career-best 22 wins in 56 games, with a GAA of 3.52 and a save percentage of 0.882. After Reddick struggled in the 1987–88 season, John Ferguson, the team's general manager, sought a veteran backup for Berthiaume. In July 1988 he traded for Alain Chevrier. Berthiaume played poorly in training camp and was the odd man out, being sent to Moncton in early October. He refused to report to Moncton and was suspended by the team. After six days, Berthiaume relented and agreed to report to the Hawks. He left the team again on November 4 and was suspended by the team five days later. He returned to team on November 28. In December Berthiaume was given a six-game suspension by the AHL for retaliating against Greg Smyth after the Halifax Citadels' player ran him, leading Berthiaume to swing his stick at the defenceman. During his suspension, he practiced with the Jets and eventually had his stay extended after his suspension ended. He made his 1988–89 NHL season debut on January 10, 1989, in a 2–1 loss to the Hartford Whalers. He made nine appearances with the Jets, going 0–8–0 with a GAA of 5.96 and a save percentage of 0.827. Berthiaume requested that he be sent back to the minors to get his game back in shape after the arrival of rookie Bob Essensa and in mid-February, he was returned to Moncton. He made 21 appearances for Moncton, going 6–9–2 with an 0.879 save percentage and a 4.21 GAA. Moncton faced the New Haven Nighthawks in the first round of the playoffs and were eliminated in the best-of-seven series. Berthiaume played in three of the six games in the series with a GAA of 3.67.

Berthiaume battled Reddick, Essensa, and newcomer Rick Tabaracci in training camp for the goalie spots on the Jets for the 1989–90 season. In September, new general manager Mike Smith traded Reddick to the Oilers and acquired Pete Peeters from the Philadelphia Flyers. However, Peeters' time with the Jets was short-lived as he was flipped back to the Flyers after the waiver draft had passed, leaving the starter's job open. Berthiaume began the season as the team's starter but by December Essensa had surpassed him. Berthiaume came under fire for allegedly swearing at children seeking his autograph after a bad loss to the Nordiques in January 1990. On January 22, 1990, he was traded to the Minnesota North Stars for future considerations. Mike Smith, general manager of the Jets, said Berthiaume's trade was related to his off-ice actions. The goalie apologized on television for swearing at autograph seekers, then a day later denied the incident took place and said he had been ordered to apologize by team management. In 24 games with Winnipeg, he went 10–11–3 with a GAA of 3.72 and a save percentage of 0.871.

==== Minnesota North Stars ====
Berthiuame made his North Stars debut on January 26 in a 6–3 victory over the Vancouver Canucks. Jon Casey was the established starter and handled the bulk of the duties for the North Stars. On February 13, Berthiaume injured his knee in practice and had to undergo surgery, missing the remainder of the season. He appeared in just five games for Minnesota, managing one win, a 3.49 GAA, and a save percentage of 0.865. Prior to training camp in 1990, Berthiaume was traded to the Los Angeles Kings for winger Craig Duncanson on September 6 in a flurry of moves by the North Stars.

==== Los Angeles Kings ====
The Kings acquired Berthiaume to serve as the backup to veteran Kelly Hrudey for the 1990–91 season. He made his Kings debut on October 9 and recorded his first win with the team in a 6–2 victory over the Canucks. He recorded his first shutout with the team in a 2–0 win over the Chicago Blackhawks on November 4. In 37 games, he had a record of 20–11–4, with a GAA of 3.31, and a save percentage of 0.892. It was the first time in Kings history that two goaltenders each earned 20 wins. His play helped the Kings win their first division title and secure a spot in the 1991 Stanley Cup playoffs. However, he did not feature for the team in the playoffs as the Kings were bounced in the second round by the Oilers. In the offseason, Berthiaume signed a one-year contract for $300,000 with an extra option year. He entered the 1991–92 season as Hrudey's backup again. He struggled early in season and by December 1991, the Kings were looking for his replacement, bringing in rookie David Goverde to start games instead. He posted a 4.04 GAA with a save percentage of 0.878, while managing just seven wins in 19 appearances. His uneven play cost him his job and he was shipped to Boston for future considerations on January 18, 1992.

==== Boston Bruins ====
The Bruins had Andy Moog firmly entrenched in their starter role but required a solid backup after young goaltender Matt DelGuidice failed to seize the spot. The Bruins brought in Berthiaume, but Moog got hurt just as he arrived and Berthiaume made his debut on January 24 in a 3–1 loss to the Montreal Canadiens. His play did not improve with the Bruins, and after the trading deadline, he was assigned to Boston's AHL affiliate, the Maine Mariners on March 10. However, his stay was short-lived with Maine as he was recalled on March 13 as Réjean Lemelin, who was expected to return from injury, suffered a setback. He did not play and was assigned to Maine again, passing through waivers and going unclaimed, after Lemelin did return. He was recalled one final time and remained with the team as the third goalie as Lemelin struggled to stay healthy. He earned his first and only win with the Bruins on April 13, in a 6–3 victory over the Whalers. Despite the Bruins making the 1992 Stanley Cup playoffs, Berthiaume was not part of the team, left behind by head coach Rick Bowness, who brought Mike Bales instead. In eight regular season games, he went 1–4–2, with a GAA of 3.16 and a save percentage of 0.865. During the offseason, the Bruins traded him back to Winnipeg for Doug Evans on June 10.

==== Jets, Europe, Ottawa Senators, and Detroit Red Wings ====
In the 1992 offseason, the NHL was expanding by two teams, the Ottawa Senators and Tampa Bay Lightning. Berthiaume was re-acquired by the Jets as protection for their own goaltenders in the upcoming 1992 NHL expansion draft. Each team had to make a goaltender available in the draft, and Berthiaume was acquired for that role. However, Berthiaume went unselected in the draft and the remaining year on his contract was bought out.

Without an NHL contract, Berthiaume went overseas to start the 1992–93 season, playing for EC Graz in Austria. In 28 games with EC Graz he had a GAA of 4.07. On December 15, 1992, he signed as a free agent with the Ottawa Senators. The first-year Senators leaned heavily on goaltender Peter Sidorkiewicz and while he faired admirably considering the heavy fire he took each night in their crease, his back-up, veteran Steve Weeks, was over-matched. Reunited with Bowness, who had been his coach in Boston, Berthiaume was brought in as another veteran to backup Sidorkiewicz. They initially planned for Berthiaume to start in the AHL with the Senators affiliate, the New Haven Senators, but after Weeks played poorly in a game versus the New York Islanders, Berthiaume joined the Senators directly. He made his 1992–93 NHL season debut for the Senators on December 26 in a 4–2 loss to the Nordiques. He earned his first win in his fifth game on January 10, 1993, a 3–2 victory over the San Jose Sharks. He appeared in 25 games posting a 2–17–1 record, a GAA of 4.30 and a save percentage of 0.871 for the lowly Senators.

In the off-season, Berthiaume signed a new one-year contract with an option with the Senators. The team upgraded their goaltending by acquiring Craig Billington and promoting rookie Darrin Madeley going into the 1993–94 season which pushed Berthiaume out of Ottawa's crease and he was sent to the team's new AHL affiliate, the Prince Edward Island Senators. He played in 30 games in the AHL, with a record of 8–16–3, a GAA of 4.76 and a save percentage of 0.871. He was recalled in November to replace the injured Madeley. He made one appearance for Ottawa and though it lasted just thirty-nine seconds on November 17 in an 8–1 drubbing by the Islanders, he surrendered two goals on two shots giving him a 184.62 goals against average for the season and zero save percentage. He was returned to the AHL on November 19. After Madeley was sent down to Prince Edward Island in March, Berthiaume was loaned to the Adirondack Red Wings of the AHL. At the trade deadline, his rights were formally traded to the Detroit Red Wings for defenceman Steve Konroyd. Berthiaume made 11 appearances with Adirondack, going 7–2–0 with a GAA of 3.80 and a save percentage of 0.874. Adirondack qualified for the 1994 Calder Cup playoffs and advanced to the second round where they were eliminated by the Portland Pirates. In 11 playoff games, Berthiaume went 6–4–0 with a GAA of 2.85 and a save percentage of 0.898.

==== Minor leagues ====
After making his final NHL appearance with the Ottawa Senators during the 1993–94 season he was a free agent again, signing with the Wheeling Thunderbirds of the ECHL in November for the 1994–95 season. He made ten appearances with Wheeling, going 6–1–1 with a GAA of 4.10 and a save percentage of 0.867. On December 26, in a paper transaction, he was loaned to the Cape Breton Oilers of the AHL, but never played for them. He was then loaned to the Providence Bruins of the AHL on December 30. In two games with Providence, he went 0–1–1 with a GAA of 3.32 and a save percentage of 0.870. When he returned to the ECHL, he passed through waivers, where he was claimed by the Erie Panthers who then immediately traded him to the Roanoke Express in February 1995 for cash. In 21 games with Roanoke, he went 15–4–2, with a GAA of 2.39 and a save percentage of 0.919 and in a tandem with Dave Gagnon, helped them top the East Division, setting a then-record of 13 consecutive victories in the ECHL. In the Riley Cup playoffs, the team made it to the quarterfinals where they were eliminated by the Richmond Renegades. In eight playoff games, he had a record of 4–4–0 with a 2.97 GAA and a save percentage of 0.905. After his season was done with Roanoke, he signed with the Detroit Vipers of the International Hockey League (IHL) in April and joined the team for their playoff run. In five playoff games, he went 2–3–0 with a 2.53 GAA and 0.926 save percentage as the team was bounced in the first round by the Kansas City Blades.

Ahead of the 1995–96 season, Berthiaume signed with the Vipers in September to play in a tandem with Rick Knickle. He appeared in seven games, with a record of 4–3–0 with two shutouts, a GAA of 2.84 and a save percentage 0.898, but was set to see his playing time decrease with the arrival of Darrin Madeley from the Ottawa Senators in November. He left the team and was suspended by the Vipers. Instead, he returned to the Roanoke Express of the ECHL and in 39 appearances he went 22–13–3 with three shutouts, a 3.19 GAA and a save percentage of 0.907 save percentage. They were eliminated in the first round of the playoffs by the Charlotte Checkers. In two playoff games, he went with 0–2, with a 3.09 GAA and a save percentage of 0.902.

Berthiaume signed with the Central Texas Stampede of the nascent Western Professional Hockey League in August 1996. In 54 games, he went 30–20–0 with two shutouts, a GAA of 3.38, and a save percentage of 0.900. He won the league's inaugural Most Outstanding Goaltender honours. In the playoffs, the Stampede advanced to the President's Cup final, where they were defeated by the El Paso Buzzards. In 11 playoff games he went 5–6–0, with a GAA of 3.80 and a save percentage of 0.895. He returned to Roanoke for the 1997–98 season and remained with the team until 2001–02. In his first season back in 1997–98, he went 18–12–5, with a GAA of 2.77 and a save percentage of 0.908. Paired once again with Gagnon, the two lead the team to the Northeast Division title and became the first tandem in league history to allow less than three goals a game. In January 1998, he was briefly loaned to the Saint John Flames of the AHL, but did not appear. In the playoffs, the Express made the second round where they faced the Hampton Roads Admirals. In game three of the series, the coaches of the Admirals and Express got into a shoving match and Berthiaume rushed to his coach's aid, also coming into contact with the Admirals' coach. This caused him to be suspended for three games by the ECHL. Ultimately, the team was eliminated by the Admirals. In two playoff appearances, both wins, he had a GAA of 2.00 and a save percentage of 0.930.

He and Gagnon both re-signed with the Express in July. Since he had not finished the suspension from the previous season, he completed it at the start of the 1998–99 season. In 35 games, he went 18–12–5, with a GAA of 2.77 and a save percentage of 0.908. After winning their division again, the team made the playoffs and got all the way to the Northern Conference final against the Richmond Renegades, but were swept in the best-of-seven series. Berthiaume played in ten games, going 6–3–1, with a GAA of 1.87 and a save percentage of 0.943. He returned for 1999–2000, again in a tandem with Gagnon. In 37 games, he went 21–12–4 with a GAA of 2.40 and a save percentage of 0.919. He was named to the league's Second All-Star Team alongside teammate Duane Harmer. Despite winning the division for the third consecutive season, the team bowed out of the playoffs in the first round, beat by the Johnstown Chiefs. In two playoff games he lost both games, with a GAA of 3.04 and a save percentage of 0.870. He re-signed with the Express in June 2000. He underwent surgery in the offseason to repair an injury to his shoulder suffered at the end of season. He was ready for the start of the 2000–01 season and had a record of 26–17–1 in 45 games, with a GAA of 2.40 and a save percentage of 0.918. However, the team was knocked out of the playoffs in the first round for the second consecutive season. In five playoff games, he went 2–3–0 with a GAA of 2.65 and a save percentage of 0.917. Ahead of the 2001–02 season, the Express were sold and Berthiaume contemplated retirement. However, in August 2001, he re-signed with the Express. For the season, Berthiaume was a player-coach for the Express. He had a record of 23–17–6 in 51 games, with a GAA of 2.72 and a save percentage of 0.912. The team finished fourth in the division and were eliminated in the first round of the playoffs for the third consecutive season. In three playoff games, he went 1–2, with a GAA of 2.98 and a save percentage of 0.883.

He was released by the Express in July 2002 as the team decided to go with youth. He remained in the ECHL, signing with the Greensboro Generals on July 11. During the 2002–03 season, Berthiaume was named to the ECHL's 15-year Second All-Star Team. In his first season with Greensboro he made 53 appearances he went 30–14–5 with a 2.90 GAA and a save percentage of 0.915. The Generals qualified for the playoffs and were eliminated in the second round by the Atlantic City Boardwalk Bullies. He went 4–4–0 with a GAA of 2.98 and a save percentage 0.925 in his final playoff appearance. He was brought back by Greensboro in October 2003 ahead of the 2003–04 season, in what would be his last in the ECHL. In 43 games, he had a record of 23–18–1, with a GAA of 3.60 and a save percentage of 0.901. Despite his solid play, he struggled towards the end of the season and the Generals fell just short of making the playoffs. He played his last season with the Port Huron Beacons of the United Hockey League, signing in October 2004. In 30 games, he went 7–17–0, with a GAA of 3.56 and a save percentage of 0.896, before retiring in 2005 and becoming an assistant coach for the Roanoke Valley Vipers. He was named to the ECHL Hall of Fame in 2015.

== Roller hockey ==
Berthiaume also played professional roller hockey, tending goal for Roller Hockey International's New Jersey Rockin' Rollers in their inaugural season in 1994 in a tandem with Manon Rhéaume. The team finished fourth in the Atlantic Division and faced the Buffalo Stampede in the opening round of the playoffs. However, the Stampede bounced them from the playoffs. In May 1995, Berthiaume's rights were acquired by the Orlando Rollergators from the Portland Rage. However, without having played a game for the team, he was flipped to the Motor City Mustangs later in the month for David Goverde. He helped the team make the playoffs in their first season, but they were eliminated in the Eastern Conference quarterfinal by the St. Louis Vipers. In February 1996, he was acquired by the Ottawa Rolar Bears to be paired with Rhéaume once again. However, in June, he was flipped to the Philadelphia Bulldogs for the rights to forward Will Averill.

== Coaching career ==
Berthiaume was the assistant coach of the Roanoke Valley Vipers in the United Hockey League at the start of their 2005-06 season., but on February 6, 2006 it was announced that Berthiaume would become the interim head coach, replacing Jim Wiley who lost his job in mid-season. He then coached the Virginia Military Institute Hockey team.

== Personal life ==
Berthiaume lives in Hardy, Virginia, where he owns and operates Captain Bert's Fishin' Charters on Smith Mountain Lake, Virginia, a freshwater striped bass fishery. He is married and has three sons.

== Career statistics ==
=== Regular season and playoffs ===
			Regular season									Playoffs
Season	Team	League	GP	W	L	T	MIN	GA	SO	GAA	SV%	GP	W	L	MIN	GA	SO	GAA	SV%
1983–84	Drummondville Voltigeurs	QMJHL	28	12	13	0	1562	131	0	5.03	.863	3	—	—	154	16	0	6.23	.828
1984–85	Drummondville Voltigeurs	QMJHL	3	1	2	0	179	17	0	5.70	.837	—	—	—	—	—	—	—	—
1984–85	Chicoutimi Saguenéens	QMJHL	56	40	11	2	3168	198	2	3.75	.885	14	8	6	770	51	0	3.97	.888
1985–86	Chicoutimi Saguenéens	QMJHL	66	34	29	3	3718	286	1	4.62	.874	9	4	5	580	37	0	3.83	.900
1985–86	Winnipeg Jets	NHL	—	—	—	—	—	—	—	—	—	1	0	1	68	4	0	3.51	.907
1986–87	Winnipeg Jets	NHL	31	18	7	3	1755	93	1	3.18	.885	8	4	4	437	21	0	2.88	.900
1986–87	Sherbrooke Canadiens	AHL	7	4	3	0	420	23	0	3.29	.883	—	—	—	—	—	—	—	—
1987–88	Winnipeg Jets	NHL	56	22	19	7	3004	176	2	3.52	.882	—	—	—	—	—	—	—	—
1988–89	Winnipeg Jets	NHL	9	0	8	0	443	44	0	5.96	.826	—	—	—	—	—	—	—	—
1988–89	Moncton Hawks	AHL	21	6	9	2	1083	76	0	4.21	.879	3	1	2	180	11	0	3.67	—
1989–90	Winnipeg Jets	NHL	24	10	11	3	1387	86	1	3.72	.871	—	—	—	—	—	—	—	—
1989–90	Minnesota North Stars	NHL	5	1	3	0	240	14	0	3.49	.865	—	—	—	—	—	—	—	—
1990–91	Los Angeles Kings	NHL	37	20	11	4	2119	117	1	3.31	.892	—	—	—	—	—	—	—	—
1991–92	Los Angeles Kings	NHL	19	7	10	1	979	66	0	4.04	.878	—	—	—	—	—	—	—	—
1991–92	Boston Bruins	NHL	8	1	4	2	399	21	0	3.16	.865	—	—	—	—	—	—	—	—
1992–93	EC Graz	AUT	28	—	—	—	—	—	—	—	—	—	—	—	—	—	—	—	—
1992–93	Ottawa Senators	NHL	25	2	17	1	1326	95	0	4.30	.871	—	—	—	—	—	—	—	—
1993–94	Ottawa Senators	NHL	1	0	0	0	1	2	0	184.62	.000	—	—	—	—	—	—	—	—
1993–94	PEI Senators	AHL	30	8	16	3	1640	130	0	4.76	.869	—	—	—	—	—	—	—	—
1993–94	Adirondack Red Wings	AHL	11	7	2	0	552	35	0	3.80	.874	11	6	4	632	30	0	2.85	.898
1994–95	Providence Bruins	AHL	2	0	1	1	126	7	0	3.32	.870	—	—	—	—	—	—	—	—
1994–95	Wheeling Thunderbirds	ECHL	10	6	1	1	600	41	0	4.10	.867	—	—	—	—	—	—	—	—
1994–95	Roanoke Express	ECHL	21	15	4	2	1196	47	0	2.36	.919	8	4	4	464	23	1	2.97	—
1994–95	Detroit Vipers	IHL	—	—	—	—	—	—	—	—	—	5	2	3	331	14	0	2.53	.926
1995–96	Detroit Vipers	IHL	7	4	3	0	401	19	2	2.84	.898	—	—	—	—	—	—	—	—
1995–96	Roanoke Express	ECHL	39	22	13	3	2109	112	2	3.19	.907	2	0	2	116	6	0	3.09	.902
1996–97	Central Texas Stampede	WPHL	54	30	20	0	3034	171	2	3.38	.900	11	5	6	678	43	1	3.80	.895
1997–98	Roanoke Express	ECHL	30	17	8	3	1711	74	2	2.59	.909	2	2	0	120	4	0	2.00	—
1998–99	Roanoke Express	ECHL	35	18	12	5	2105	97	2	2.76	.908	10	6	4	608	19	1	1.88	.943
1999–00	Roanoke Express	ECHL	37	21	12	4	2103	87	2	2.48	.919	2	0	2	118	6	0	3.04	.870
2000–01	Roanoke Express	ECHL	45	26	17	1	2604	104	4	2.40	.918	5	2	3	339	15	0	2.65	.917
2001–02	Roanoke Express	ECHL	51	23	17	6	2847	129	4	2.72	.912	3	1	2	141	7	0	2.98	.883
2002–03	Greensboro Generals	ECHL	53	30	14	5	2998	145	2	2.90	.915	8	4	4	483	24	0	2.98	.925
2003–04	Greensboro Generals	ECHL	43	23	18	1	2518	151	0	3.60	.901	—	—	—	—	—	—	—	—
2004–05	Port Huron Beacons	UHL	30	7	17	3	1601	95	0	3.56	.896	—	—	—	—	—	—	—	—
NHL totals			215	81	90	21	11,654	714	5	3.68	.878	14	5	9	807	50	0	3.72	.877

== Awards ==
Award	Year
QMJHL
Jacques Plante Memorial Trophy (Best GAA)	1985
Michel Brière Memorial Trophy	1985
First Team All-Star	1985
WPHL
Outstanding Goaltender	1997
ECHL
Second Team All-Star	2000
ECHL Hall of Fame	2015

== Bibliography ==
- MacGregor, Roy (1993). Road Games: A Year in the Life of the NHL. Toronto: MacFarlane Walter & Ross. ISBN 0-921912-70-6.
