= Roanoke Steam =

Arena football team

Logo

General information
- Founded: 1999
- Folded: 2002
- Headquartered: Roanoke Civic Center in Roanoke, Virginia
- Colors: Deep purple, green, white

Personnel
- Owners: Roanoke Pro Football, LLC (2000-2002) af2 (Remainder of 2002)

Team history
- Roanoke Steam (2000–2002)

Home fields
- Roanoke Civic Center (2000–2002)

League / conference affiliations
- af2 (2000–2002): American Conference (2000–2002); Eastern Division (2001); Atlantic Division (2002)

The Roanoke Steam was an arena football team that began as a charter member franchise of af2, the developmental league for the Arena Football League. They played their home games at the Roanoke Civic Center in Roanoke, Virginia. The Steam were unable to get into the playoffs during their only three years in the league. In early May of the 2002 season, the original ownership group, consisting of businessmen Harold Jordan, Richard Macher, and Richard Yancey, declared that the LLC controlling the franchise was bankrupt and subsequently fired all team employees. In order to preserve the existing af2 schedule, the league office assumed control of the team and hired back the remaining employees. After a two-month search for a new ownership group, the league ceased operations of the franchise in late July 2002. Several reasons were cited for the collapse of the Steam, including poor attendance, inadequate marketing, and Roanoke being an unsuitable market to maintain a minor league football franchise.

The Steam were not the only minor league franchise in the Roanoke area to encounter problems in the 2000s. The Roanoke Dazzle of the NBDL were relocated after also never developing a consistent following; however, the team's attendance was similar to the other inaugural franchises of the NBDL which were located in small cities in the Southeast.

The Roanoke Express, a minor league ice hockey team who were owned for a time by the Steam's ownership group and had enjoyed an unprecedented level of popularity in the mid to late 1990s, began to falter in the early 2000s due to a lack of postseason success and an eventual decline in regular season performance and turmoil in ownership and management that contributed to bad press and less effective marketing than earlier seasons. The Express folded after the 2003-2004 season. A United Hockey League franchise, the Roanoke Valley Vipers, relocated to Roanoke for the 2005-2006 season to replace the Express, but this venture folded after just one season due to poor attendance blamed on a losing record, high ticket prices, and a general disconnect between the local fan base and the midwestern-based league and owners.

On May 1, 2004, nearly two years after the Steam folded, their turf field was sold to the owners of the Wichita Falls Thunder indoor football team for the non-negotiable price of $45,000

== Season-by-season ==
Season records
Season	W	L	T	Finish	Playoff results
2000	3	13	0	7th AC	--
2001	7	9	0	4th AC Northeastern	--
2002	8	8	0	4th AC Atlantic	--
Totals	18	30	0		
