= Éric Landry =

Canadian ice hockey player

- Born: January 20, 1975 (age 51) Gatineau, Quebec, Canada
- Height: 5 ft 11 in (180 cm)
- Weight: 185 lb (84 kg; 13 st 3 lb)
- Position: Centre
- Shot: Left
- Played for: HC Dynamo Moscow; Atlant Mytishchi; Calgary Flames; Montreal Canadiens; HC Lausanne; EHC Basel; HC Ambrì-Piotta
- NHL draft: Undrafted
- Playing career: 1995–2012

Joseph Éric Lucien Landry (born January 20, 1975) is a Canadian former professional ice hockey player. Landry played 68 games in the National Hockey League (NHL) with the Calgary Flames and the Montreal Canadiens from 1997 to 2002. He also played in the Kontinental Hockey League for HC Dynamo Moscow and Atlant Mytishchi and in the Swiss National League A (NLA) for Lausanne HC, EHC Basel, and HC Ambrì-Piotta from 2003 to 2012. In 2017, he became head coach of the Gatineau Olympiques in the Quebec Major Junior Hockey League, staying in that role until 2020.

== Playing career ==
Born in Gatineau, Landry played midget hockey for Abitibi-Temiscamingue Forestiers, then played two seasons of junior hockey for Saint-Hyacinthe Laser of the Quebec Major Junior Hockey League. Although he was not drafted in the NHL entry draft, Landry pursued a professional hockey career. For the 1995–96 season, he joined the Cape Breton Oilers of the American Hockey League (AHL) to start his career. Landry moved on to the Hamilton Bulldogs for 1996–97. He was then signed as a free agent by the Calgary Flames. He played two seasons for the Flames' organization, split between the Saint John Flames and Calgary. He was traded to the San Jose Sharks in July 1999. Landry played one season in the Sharks organization, for their Kentucky Thoroughblades affiliate. In 2000, he was signed by the Montreal Canadiens and played in the organization for three years, split between Montreal and Quebec Citadelles and the Utah Grizzlies of the AHL. In 2003, Landry left North America to play with Lausanne of the Swiss league. He left North America having played parts of four seasons in the NHL, scoring 5 goals and 9 assists for 14 points in 68 games. Landry was the first player in Canadiens' history to wear the jersey number of 78.

After playing four seasons in the NLA in Switzerland for Lausanne and Basel, Landry moved to Russia, where he played two seasons with Moscow Dynamo and a season with Atlant Mytishchi. Landry returned to the NLA in 2010, to play for HC Ambrì-Piotta.

== Career statistics ==
=== Regular season and playoffs ===
			Regular season					Playoffs
Season	Team	League	GP	G	A	Pts	PIM	GP	G	A	Pts	PIM
1991–92	Abitibi-Témiscamingue Forestiers	QMAAA	40	15	11	26	98	1	0	0	0	19
1993–94	Saint-Hyacinthe Laser	QMJHL	69	42	34	76	128	7	4	2	6	13
1994–95	Saint-Hyacinthe Laser	QMJHL	68	38	36	74	249	5	2	1	3	10
1995–96	Saint-Hyacinthe Laser	QMJHL	7	7	3	10	40	—	—	—	—	—
1995–96	Cape Breton Oilers	AHL	74	19	33	52	187	—	—	—	—	—
1996–97	Hamilton Bulldogs	AHL	74	15	17	32	139	22	6	7	13	43
1997–98	Calgary Flames	NHL	12	1	0	1	4	—	—	—	—	—
1997–98	Saint John Flames	AHL	61	17	21	38	194	20	4	6	10	58
1998–99	Calgary Flames	NHL	3	0	1	1	0	—	—	—	—	—
1998–99	Saint John Flames	AHL	56	19	22	41	158	7	2	5	7	12
1999–00	Kentucky Thoroughblades	AHL	79	35	31	66	170	9	3	6	9	2
2000–01	Montreal Canadiens	NHL	3	0	1	1	0	—	—	—	—	—
2000–01	Quebec Citadelles	AHL	27	14	18	32	90	9	4	4	8	35
2001–02	Montreal Canadiens	NHL	2	0	1	1	0	—	—	—	—	—
2001–02	Quebec Citadelles	AHL	63	32	43	75	125	3	1	1	2	16
2002–03	Utah Grizzlies	AHL	73	26	36	62	119	2	0	1	1	2
2003–04	Lausanne HC	NLA	47	21	27	48	90	—	—	—	—	—
2004–05	Lausanne HC	NLA	41	18	21	39	88	—	—	—	—	—
2005–06	EHC Basel	NLA	40	20	15	35	116	5	0	1	1	12
2006–07	EHC Basel	NLA	16	4	5	9	40	—	—	—	—	—
2006–07	SC Bern	NLA	27	5	6	11	32	10	3	3	6	8
2007–08	Dynamo Moscow	RSL	41	10	6	16	52	9	4	4	8	2
2008–09	Dynamo Moscow	KHL	42	14	15	29	52	11	5	3	8	22
2009–10	Atlant Mystishchi	KHL	54	5	10	15	74	3	0	0	0	2
2010–11	HC Ambri-Piotta	NLA	31	10	12	22	14	—	—	—	—	—
2011–12	HC Ambri-Piotta	NLA	25	5	6	11	28	—	—	—	—	—
AHL totals			507	177	221	398	1182	72	19	30	50	168
NHL totals			68	5	9	14	47	—	—	—	—	—
