= Carl Fleury =

Canadian ice hockey player

- Born: October 22, 1973 (age 51); Sainte-Claire, Quebec, Canada
- Height: 6 ft 1 in (185 cm)
- Weight: 198 lb (90 kg; 14 st 2 lb)
- Position: Centre
- Shot: Right
- Played for: Quebec Citadelles
- NHL draft: Undrafted
- Playing career: 1994–2004

Carl Fleury (born October 22, 1973) is a Canadian retired professional ice hockey player who played 10 seasons across the ECHL and LNAH who is the current head coach of the Trois-Rivières Caron et Guay of the LNAH.

== Playing career ==
Born in Sainte-Claire, Quebec, Fleury spent the majority of his ECHL career as a member of the Johnstown Chiefs. Upon leaving the Chiefs in 2000, he joined St. Georges-de-Beauce Garaga, where he would play 4 seasons before leaving the team after the 2003-04 LNAH season.

== Coaching career ==
Fleury would return to Saint Georges, Quebec to coach the Saint-Georges CRS Express, where he would lead the team to the Futura Cup. The former Saint-Georges Garaga - the team Fleury played for from 2000-2004 - were renamed the CRS Express after businessman Jean-Paul Blais bought the team in 2005. Blais is the owner of the CRS Express trucking company.
