= Aleksandrs Jerofejevs =

Latvian ice hockey player (born 1984)

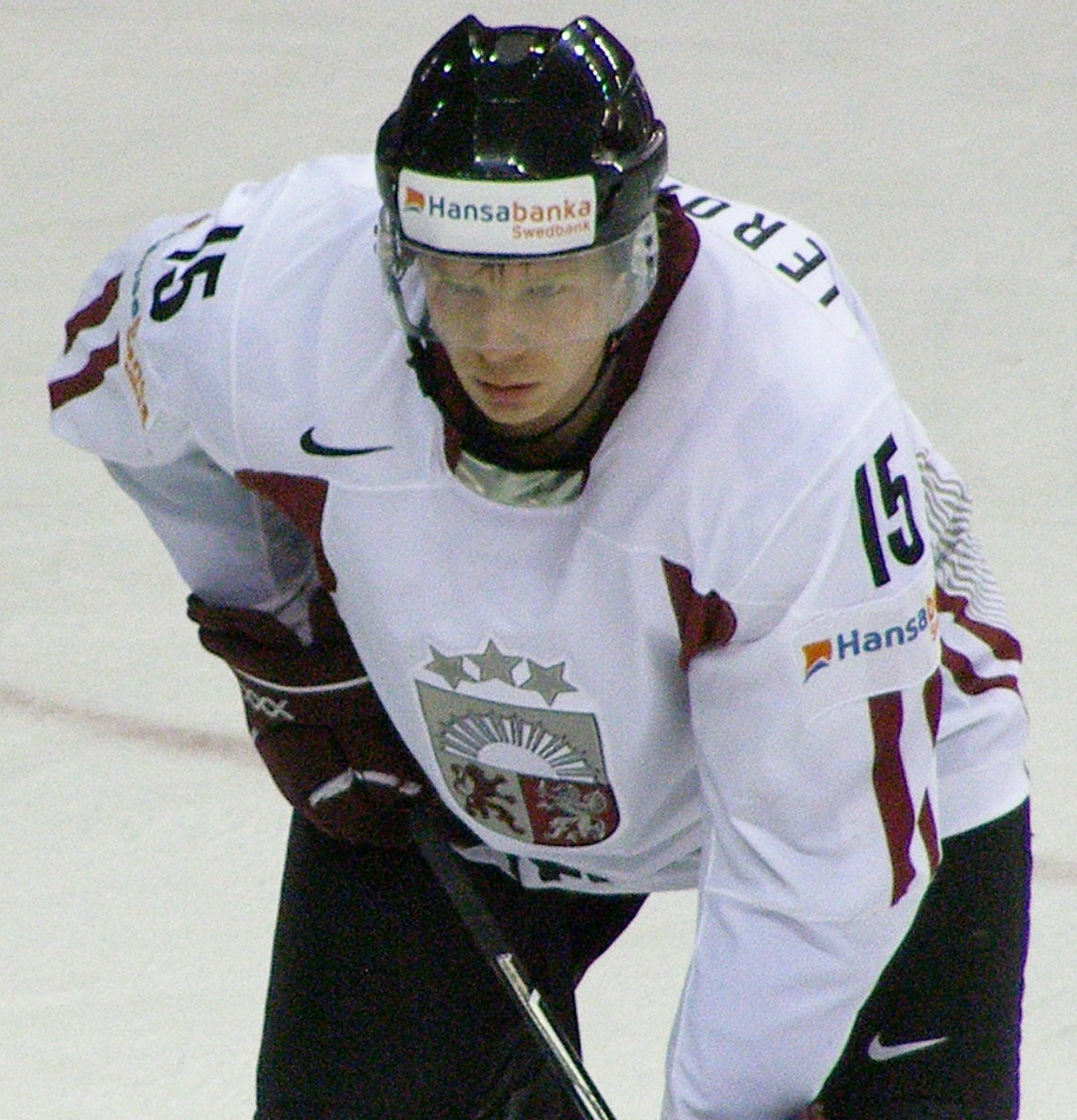
- Born: 12 April 1984 (age 42) Riga, Latvia
- Height: 6 ft 3 in (191 cm)
- Weight: 190 lb (86 kg; 13 st 8 lb)
- Position: Defence
- Shoots: Left
- KHL team Former teams: Dinamo Riga; HK NIK's Brih Riga; Stalkers-Juniors Daugavpils; Sioux Falls Stampede; Metalurgs Liepaja; Roanoke Valley Vipers; Ilves Tampere; HK ŠKP Poprad; HC Sparta Praha; HC Neftekhimik Nizhnekamsk; Metallurg Novokuznetsk; HC Slovan Bratislava
- National team: Latvia
- Playing career: 1999–present

Aleksandrs Jerofejevs (sometimes referred to as Alexander Erofeev; born 12 April 1984) is a Latvian ice hockey defenceman, currently playing for Dinamo Riga of Kontinental Hockey League (KHL).

Before playing European Elite hockey, Erofeev played 2004–05 in the USHL with the Sioux Falls Stampede and 2005–06 in the UHL with the Roanoke Valley Vipers. He is currently playing for Latvia in the 2015 IIHF World Championship.
