= Saint-Hyacinthe Laser =

- City: Saint-Hyacinthe, Quebec
- League: Quebec Major Junior Hockey League
- Operated: 1989 to 1996
- Home arena: Stade L.P. Gaucher

Franchise history
- 1933-1972: Montreal Junior Canadiens
- 1972-1975: Montreal Bleu Blanc Rouge
- 1975-1982: Montreal Juniors
- 1982-1984: Verdun Juniors
- 1984-1989: Verdun Junior Canadiens
- 1989-1996: Saint-Hyacinthe Laser
- 1996-Present: Rouyn-Noranda Huskies

The Saint-Hyacinthe Laser were a junior ice hockey team in the Quebec Major Junior Hockey League from 1989 to 1996. They played their home games at Stade L.P. Gaucher in Saint-Hyacinthe, Quebec, Canada.

== History ==
The Saint-Hyacinthe Laser were born in 1989 after the Verdun Junior Canadiens were bought and moved to the city of Saint-Hyacinthe, Quebec. The team played for seven years before moving to Rouyn-Noranda.

In the third year of operation, general manager Claude Lemieux was named Executive of the Year (John Horman Trophy). He rebuilt the Verdun Junior Canadiens team that struggled in last place in the QMJHL for three seasons into a club with a winning record, and was awarded for many individual achievements in the next few years. Richard Martel was awarded Coach of the Year in 1993-94 (Ron Lapointe Trophy). His assistant coach that season was Mario Pouliot.

== Players ==
The most notable player in the team's history is goaltender Martin Brodeur. He played three full seasons with the Laser, being drafted 20th overall in the 1st round of the 1990 NHL entry draft.

=== Award winners ===
CHL Player of the Year

- 1991-92 Charles Poulin

CHL Sportsman of the Year

- 1991-92 Martin Gendron

CHL Humanitarian of the Year

- 1994-95 David-Alexandre Beauregard

Jean Béliveau Trophy
(Top Scorer)

- 1991-92 Patrick Poulin

Michel Brière Commemorative Trophy
(Most valuable player)

- 1991-92 Charles Poulin

Shell Cup – Offensive
(Offensive player of the year)

- 1991-92 Martin Gendron

Raymond Lagacé Trophy
(Offensive Rookie of the Year)

- 1993-94 Jimmy Drolet

Frank J. Selke Memorial Trophy
(Most sportsmanlike player)

- 1991-92 Martin Gendron
- 1992-93 Martin Gendron

Paul Dumont Trophy
(Personality of the year)

- 1991-92 Patrick Poulin

Wittnauer Plaque
(Best community involvement)

- 1994-95 David-Alexandre Beauregard

=== NHL alumni ===
- Martin Brodeur
- Frederic Cassivi
- Eric Charron
- Martin Gendron
- Eric Landry
- Georges Laraque
- Craig Martin
- Dean Melanson
- Patrick Poulin
- Remi Royer
- Pierre Sevigny

== Season-by-season results ==
=== Regular season ===
| Season | Games | Won | Lost | Tied | Points | Pct % | Goals for | Goals against | Standing |
|---|---|---|---|---|---|---|---|---|---|
| 1989–90 | 70 | 35 | 29 | 6 | 76 | 0.543 | 299 | 301 | 7th QMJHL |
| 1990–91 | 70 | 36 | 30 | 4 | 76 | 0.543 | 287 | 251 | 4th Lebel |
| 1991–92 | 70 | 35 | 28 | 7 | 77 | 0.550 | 332 | 274 | 4th Lebel |
| 1992–93 | 70 | 29 | 37 | 4 | 62 | 0.443 | 312 | 320 | 5th Lebel |
| 1993–94 | 72 | 35 | 30 | 7 | 77 | 0.535 | 297 | 290 | 4th Lebel |
| 1994–95 | 72 | 26 | 42 | 4 | 56 | 0.389 | 241 | 310 | 5th Lebel |
| 1995–96 | 70 | 23 | 44 | 3 | 49 | 0.350 | 242 | 353 | 6th Lebel |

=== Playoffs ===
- 1989-1990 Defeated Trois-Rivières Draveurs 4 games to 3 in quarter-finals.
  Lost to Victoriaville Tigres 4 games to 1 in semi-finals.
- 1990-1991 Lost to Longueuil Collège Français 4 games to 0 in quarter-finals.
- 1991-1992 Lost to Verdun Collège Français 4 games to 2 in quarter-finals.
- 1992-1993 Out of playoffs.
- 1993-1994 Lost to Hull Olympiques 4 games to 3 in division quarter-finals.
- 1994-1995 Lost to Hull Olympiques 4 games to 1 in division quarter-finals.
- 1995-1996 Finished 4th place (3 wins, 4 losses) in 6 team round-robin for division quarter-finals.
  Lost to Granby Prédateurs 4 games to 1 in quarter-finals.
