= Quebec Citadelles =

Professional ice hockey team

- City: Quebec City, Quebec
- League: American Hockey League
- Operated: 1999–2002
- Home arena: Colisée Pepsi
- Colours: Navy blue, white, gold, silver
- Affiliates: Montreal Canadiens

Franchise history
- 1969–1971: Montreal Voyageurs
- 1971–1984: Nova Scotia Voyageurs
- 1984–1990: Sherbrooke Canadiens
- 1990–1999: Fredericton Canadiens
- 1999–2002: Quebec Citadelles
- 2002–2015: Hamilton Bulldogs
- 2015–2017: St. John's IceCaps
- 2017–present: Laval Rocket

Championships
- Division titles: 2 (1999–00, 2001–02)

The Quebec Citadelles (French: Citadelles de Québec) were a Canadian ice hockey team in the American Hockey League. They played in Quebec City, Quebec, Canada at the Colisée Pepsi. The name refers to the Citadelle of Quebec, a landmark fortification in that city since the late 17th century.

The Citadelles were a minor-league feeder team that developed players for the NHL's Montreal Canadiens organization. This AHL team was established in 1999 to much fanfare, and played with good fan support (and some success) for three seasons, before being relocated and merged into the Hamilton Bulldogs.

== History ==
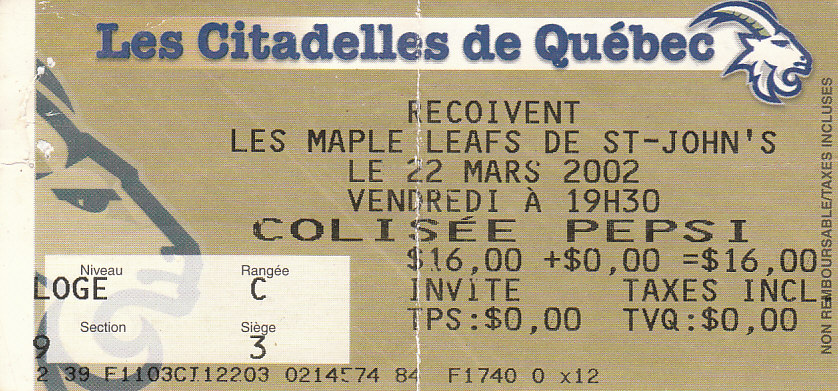
Quebec Citadelles French language ticket for a game against the St. John's Maple Leafs in 2002

One of the team's most striking features was its choice of a mascot and emblem. The team's sweaters were emblazoned with an iconically depicted goat's head, representing the goat mascot of the Royal 22^{e} Régiment (The Van Doos) stationed in the Citadel of Quebec. By tradition, this goat is always named 'Batisse'. The regiment's goat is a descendant of one presented to the unit by Queen Elizabeth II in 1955 (which, in turn, was the descendant of a goat given to Queen Victoria from the Shah of Iran in 1844).

The franchise was previously known as: Fredericton Canadiens (1990–1999).
The market was previously served by: Quebec Rafales of the IHL (1996–1998).
The market is currently served by: Quebec Remparts of the Quebec Major Junior Hockey League (1997–present).
The franchise was merged with the: Hamilton Bulldogs (co-owned with the Edmonton Oilers organization in 2002, and wholly operated by the Montreal Canadiens from 2003–2015).

== Season-by-season results ==
=== Regular season ===
| Season | Games | Won | Lost | Tied | OTL | Points | Goals for | Goals against | Standing |
|---|---|---|---|---|---|---|---|---|---|
| 1999–00 | 80 | 37 | 34 | 5 | 4 | 83 | 227 | 238 | 1st, Atlantic |
| 2000–01 | 80 | 41 | 32 | 3 | 4 | 89 | 264 | 252 | 2nd, Canadian |
| 2001–02 | 80 | 35 | 27 | 15 | 3 | 88 | 257 | 254 | 1st, Canadian |

=== Playoffs ===
| Season | 1st round | 2nd round | 3rd round | Finals |
|---|---|---|---|---|
| 1999–00 | L, 0–3, Providence | — | — | — |
| 2000–01 | W, 3–1, St. John's | L, 1–4, Saint John | — | — |
| 2001–02 | L, 0–3, Hamilton | — | — | — |

== AHL team records ==
Goals: 32 (Canada) Eric Landry (2001–02)
Assists: 55 (United States) Craig Darby (2001–02)
Points: 75 Eric Landry (2001–02)
Penalty minutes: 231 (Canada) Dave Morissette (1999–00)
GAA: 2.37 (Canada) Dan Murphy (1999–00)
SV%: .924 Dan Murphy (1999–00)
Career goals: 66 (Canada) Pierre Sevigny
Career assists: 97 Pierre Sevigny
Career points: 163 Pierre Sevigny
Career penalty minutes: 380 (Canada) Jonathan Delisle
Career goaltending wins: 53 (Canada) Mathieu Garon
Career shutouts: 5 Mathieu Garon
Career games: 218 Pierre Sevigny

Affiliates

- Montreal Canadiens (1999-2002)

== Notable Citadelles ==
- Carl Fleury
- Ron Hainsey
- Andrei Markov
- Stephane Robidas
- Michael Ryder
- Mike Ribeiro
- Mathieu Garon

== Other teams with the same name ==
An early incarnation of the team played in the Quebec Junior Hockey League during the 1920s through the 1960s, developing such notable players as Jean Beliveau, Camille Henry, and Jacques Plante. It was also notable for having the first two Newfoundland trained players to play Major Junior hockey.
