= Stephen Tepper =

American ice hockey player (born 1969)

- Born: March 10, 1969 (age 57) Santa Ana, California, U.S.
- Height: 6 ft 4 in (193 cm)
- Weight: 215 lb (98 kg; 15 st 5 lb)
- Position: Right wing
- Shot: Left
- Played for: Chicago Blackhawks
- NHL draft: 134th overall, 1987; Chicago Blackhawks
- Playing career: 1992–1996

Stephen Christopher Tepper (born March 10, 1969) is an American former professional ice hockey right wing. He was drafted in the seventh round, 134th overall, by the Chicago Blackhawks in the 1987 NHL entry draft. After playing four seasons at the University of Maine, Tepper played one game in the National Hockey League with the Blackhawks during the 1992–93 season on November 5, 1992, against the Toronto Maple Leafs. He was hit directly in the face with a shot, and did not record a point.

He now coaches for the Northstar Youth Hockey Program in Westboro, MA.

== Career statistics ==
=== Regular season and playoffs ===
			Regular season					Playoffs
Season	Team	League	GP	G	A	Pts	PIM	GP	G	A	Pts	PIM
1988–89	University of Maine	HE	26	3	9	12	32	—	—	—	—	—
1989–90	University of Maine	HE	41	10	6	16	68	—	—	—	—	—
1990–91	University of Maine	HE	38	6	11	17	58	—	—	—	—	—
1991–92	University of Maine	HE	16	0	3	3	20	—	—	—	—	—
1992–93	Chicago Blackhawks	NHL	1	0	0	0	0	—	—	—	—	—
1992–93	Indianapolis Ice	IHL	12	0	1	1	40	—	—	—	—	—
1992–93	Kansas City Blades	IHL	32	4	10	14	51	4	0	1	1	6
1993–94	Fort Worth Fire	CHL	25	23	11	34	54	—	—	—	—	—
1993–94	Roanoke Express	ECHL	9	2	2	4	33	—	—	—	—	—
1993–94	Kansas City Blades	IHL	23	1	3	4	52	—	—	—	—	—
1994–95	Fort Worth Fire	CHL	35	26	22	48	63	—	—	—	—	—
1994–95	Cape Breton Oilers	AHL	26	1	4	5	16	—	—	—	—	—
1995–96	Cape Breton Oilers	AHL	52	8	14	22	74	—	—	—	—	—
AHL totals			78	9	18	27	90	—	—	—	—	—
NHL totals			1	0	0	0	0	—	—	—	—	—

== See also ==
- List of players who played only one game in the NHL
