= Berglund Center =

Arena in Roanoke, Virginia, US

- Interactive map of Berglund Center
- Former names: Roanoke Civic Center (1971–2014)
- Location: 710 Williamson Road Northeast; Roanoke, VA 24016
- Coordinates: 37.280171°N 79.935669°W
- Owner: City of Roanoke
- Operator: City of Roanoke
- Capacity: Basketball: 8,614; Ice hockey: 8,672; End stage: 10,500; Center stage: 10,600; Eclipse: 4,276; Performing Arts Center: 2,151
- Surface: Multi-surface

Construction
- Groundbreaking: 1969
- Opened: October 3, 1971
- Renovated: 2007 (Performing Arts Center and Special Events Center addition); 2012–2016 (arena renovations)
- Cost: $14 million ($111 million in 2025 dollars)
- Architects: Smithey & Boynton; Frantz & Chappelear; Thompson & Payne
- General contractor: Nello L. Teer Company

Tenants
- Virginia Tech Hokies Ice Hockey; Roanoke Maroons Ice Hockey; Radford Highlanders ice hockey Roanoke Valley Rebels (EHL/SHL) (1970–1976); Virginia Squires (ABA) (1971–1972); Roanoke Express (ECHL) (1993–2004); Roanoke Steam (af2) (2000–2002); Roanoke Dazzle (NBADL) (2001–2006); Roanoke Valley Vipers (UHL) (2005–2006); Roanoke Rail Yard Dawgs (SPHL) (2016–present)

Berglund Center (originally called the Roanoke Civic Center) is a 10,500-seat multi-purpose arena located in the Williamson Road neighborhood of Roanoke, Virginia. It was built in 1971 and is currently the home of the Roanoke Rail Yard Dawgs of the SPHL. The arena also hosts Virginia Tech, Radford University and Roanoke College men's ice hockey games, as well as regular concerts and other large indoor events. The Grateful Dead played at Roanoke three times - the first in July 1974, and the other two occasions almost exactly thirteen years later in July 1987.

It was the former home to the Virginia Squires and Roanoke Dazzle basketball teams, the Roanoke Express and Roanoke Valley Vipers ice hockey teams, and the Roanoke Steam arena football team.

== History ==
Opened in October 1971, the Roanoke Civic Center was also the former home of the American Basketball Association (1967–1976) professional basketball franchise Virginia Squires. The Squires played there (in addition to the Norfolk Scope, Richmond Coliseum and Hampton Coliseum; all within the state of Virginia) from 1971 to 1972. The Virginia Squires used the Civic Center for only one season due to low attendance, before folding in 1976. Elvis Presley performed there in 1972, 1974, 1976, and was due to return in 1977, about a week after his death. It hosted 251 professional wrestling events between 1975 and 2013. WCW held Fall Brawl (1994) there and Monday Nitro on March 31, 1997. WWE brought Monday Night Raw on November 25, 1997, May 6, 2013, and November 17, 2014. The 1977–1981 Southern Conference men's basketball tournaments were held there as well.

From 2001 to 2006, professional basketball was active again at the Roanoke Civic Center, with the National Basketball Association's D-League franchise, the Roanoke Dazzle. College basketball was also recently contested there, in the form of the Big South Conference men's basketball tournaments in 2001 and 2002. The Metro Conference men's basketball tournament was held here in 1991. The Southern Conference basketball tournament took place at the arena between 1977 and 1981. When both the Dazzle and Vipers folded after the 2005–06 season, the Roanoke Civic Center was left with 60 open dates to fill for the upcoming fall and winter. Eventually, nearly two-thirds of these open dates were awarded to the Virginia Tech, Radford University and Roanoke College hockey clubs, the arena's primary tenants until 2016, when the Mississippi Surge relocated to Roanoke, becoming the Rail Yard Dawgs.

In May 2023, the Berglund Center hosted games three and four of the Southern Professional Hockey League finals, both won by the hometown Rail Yard Dawgs over the Birmingham Bulls, clinching the Dawgs' first championship.

== Overview ==
Built at the same time as the Scope and Richmond Coliseum, the Roanoke Civic Center is the area's premier sports and entertainment venue. There are eight restrooms and six concession stands at the arena, which has a 60-foot (18 m) ceiling height and 10 spotlights as well as a portable stage that is no larger than 60-by-40 feet. There are 8,372 permanent seats at the arena; the arena floor measures over 20,000 square feet (1,900 m^{2}). The Eclipse forms the Coliseum's half-house configuration. The arena recently began a $6.2 million renovation project expected to last until 2016. The arena's heating system has been replaced, and plans call for upgrades to the arena's electrical system and to all arena entrances, as well as for all seats to be replaced.

Adjacent are a 14,396-square-foot (1,337.4 m^{2}) exhibit hall with 10,000 square feet (930 m^{2}) of column-free space, and a 2,440-seat theatre that can be used for concerts, Broadway shows, the Roanoke Symphony Orchestra and other special events. The theatre features a 55-foot (17 m)-by-105-foot stage; 1,625 seats in the theatre are in the orchestra level, 295 in the loge and 520 in the balcony. After recent renovations, the facility became known as the Roanoke Performing Arts Theatre.

A 46,000-square-foot (4,300 m^{2}) special events center was added to the Civic Center in 2007; it is used for trade shows, meetings, conventions and other special events. It can hold up to 3,066 seated, 5,850 standing. The ceiling height is 32 feet.

== Professional sports teams ==
- Virginia Squires, American Basketball Association (1971–1976)
- Roanoke Express, East Coast Hockey League (1993–2004)
- Roanoke Steam, AF2 (2000–2002)
- Roanoke Dazzle, NBA G League (2001–2006)
- Roanoke Valley Vipers, United Hockey League (2005–2006)
- Roanoke Rail Yard Dawgs, Southern Professional Hockey League (2016–present)
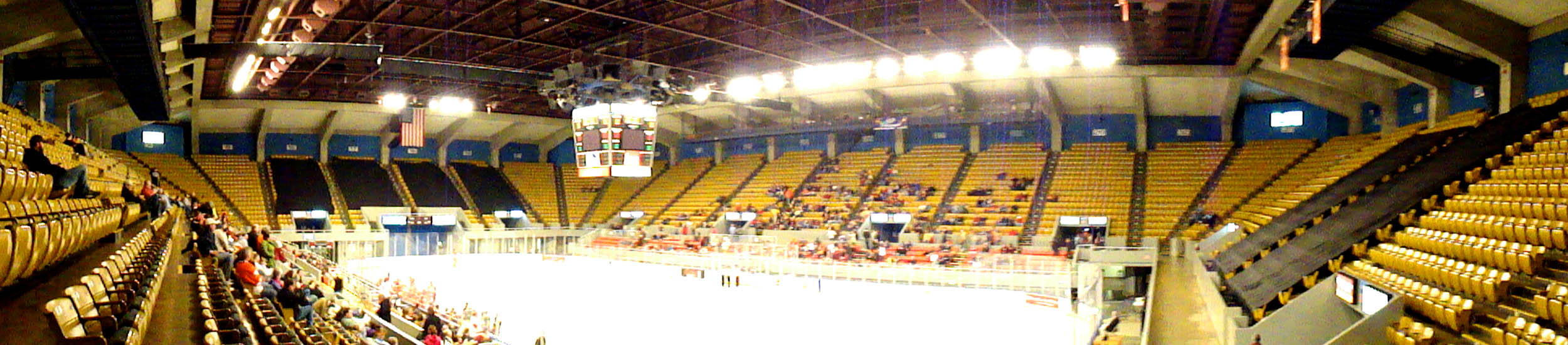
The interior of the arena with its hockey configuration in place for a Virginia Tech Hokies ice hockey game, prior to the 2016 renovations.

Preceded by Hampton Coliseum	Home of the Virginia Squires; 1971–1976	Succeeded by last arena
