= Dave Morissette =

Canadian ice hockey player

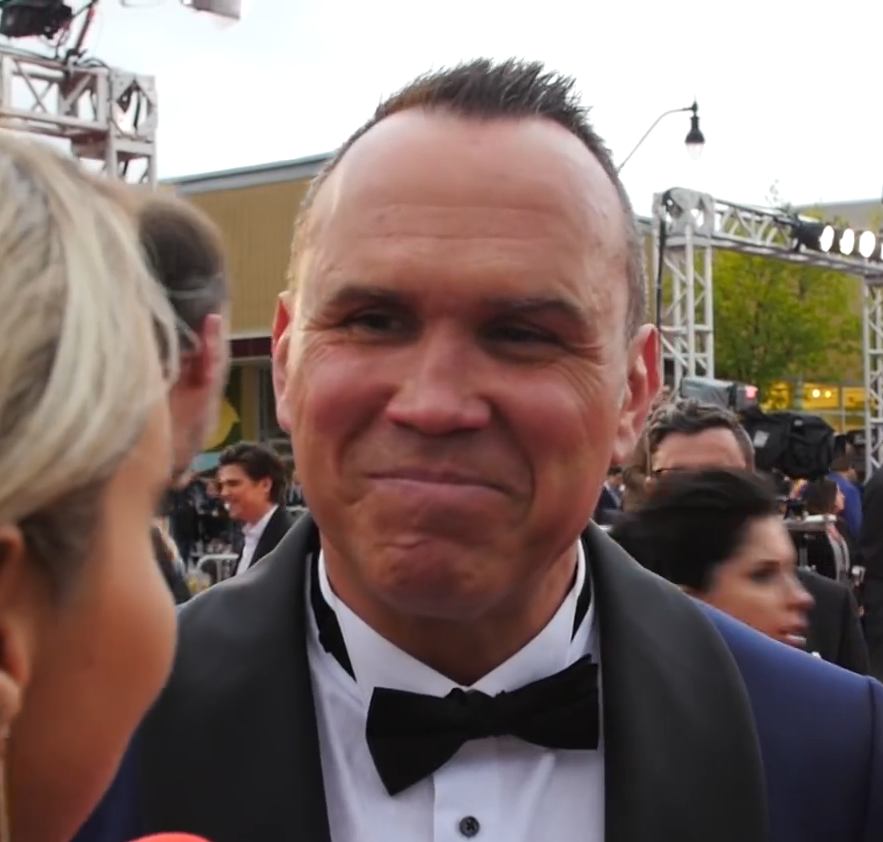
- Dave Morissette in 2017
- Born: December 24, 1971 (age 54) Baie-Comeau, QC, CAN
- Height: 6 ft 1 in (185 cm)
- Weight: 225 lb (102 kg; 16 st 1 lb)
- Position: Left wing
- Shot: Left
- Played for: Baltimore Skipjacks; Hampton Roads Admirals; Roanoke Express; Minnesota Moose; Houston Aeros; Austin Ice Bats; Montreal Canadiens; Fredericton Canadiens; Quebec Citadelles; Lake Charles Ice Pirates; London Knights
- NHL draft: 146th overall, 1991; Washington Capitals
- Playing career: 1991–2001

David Eugène "Moose" Morissette (born December 24, 1971) is a Canadian retired professional ice hockey left winger and enforcer who played 11 seasons in various leagues in North America.

== Career ==
Morissette played junior hockey for the Shawinigan Cataractes of the QMJHL, for whom he was a 1st-round draft pick in the 1988 QMJHL Entry draft. He played for the Cataractes for 3 seasons, totaling 72 points and 789 PIMs in 196 games. Following the 1990–91 season, he was selected in the 1991 NHL entry draft by the Washington Capitals, 146th overall.

He turned professional the following season, playing for both of the Capitals farm teams, the Hampton Roads Admirals and Baltimore Skipjacks. Morissette would play in the ECHL for 3 seasons for both the Skipjacks and the Roanoke Express before joining the Minnesota Moose of the IHL for the 1994–95 season. He would play for one season in Roanoke, before joining the Houston Aeros for the 1996–97 season, for whom he also played for 2 years. During this time, he also dressed for the Austin Ice Bats of the WPHL.

Throughout the 1998–99 season Morissette primarily played for the Fredericton Canadiens of the AHL, however, he also played 11 games for the Montreal Canadiens, during which time he fought notable heavyweights including Bob Probert, Gino Odjick and Rob Ray. The following season, Morissette would again play for the Habs' AHL affiliate, this time the Quebec Citadelles, and was called up once to play for the Habs. In his final season in hockey, Morissette played Lake Charles Ice Pirates of the WPHL before moving overseas to play for the London Knights in the BISL.

== Post-playing career ==
Following the culmination of his professional Hockey career, Morissette now works as a TV presenter for TVA Sports where he hosts 'Dave Morissette en Direct'. He has won six Artis Awards for his presenting work. As of 2018, Morissette has been a spokesperson for Réno-Dépôt.

Morissette's son Zack also plays hockey, and was selected in the 2019 QMJHL Entry Draft by the Baie-Comeau Drakkar.

== Career statistics ==
=== Regular season and playoffs ===
			Regular season					Playoffs
Season	Team	League	GP	G	A	Pts	PIM	GP	G	A	Pts	PIM
1988–89	Shawinigan Cataractes	QMJHL	66	4	11	15	296	9	0	1	1	43
1989–90	Shawinigan Cataractes	QMJHL	66	2	9	11	269	4	0	0	0	18
1990–91	Shawinigan Cataractes	QMJHL	64	20	26	46	224	6	1	1	2	17
1991–92	Baltimore Skipjacks	AHL	2	0	0	0	6	—	—	—	—	—
1992–93	Hampton Roads Admirals	ECHL	54	9	13	22	226	2	0	0	0	2
1993–94	Roanoke Express	ECHL	45	8	10	18	278	2	0	2	1	4
1994–95	Minnesota Moose	IHL	50	1	4	5	174	—	—	—	—	—
1995–96	Minnesota Moose	IHL	33	3	2	5	104	—	—	—	—	—
1996–97	Houston Aeros	IHL	59	2	1	3	214	2	0	0	0	0
1996–97	Austin Ice Bats	WPHL	5	2	3	5	10	—	—	—	—	—
1997–98	Houston Aeros	IHL	67	4	4	8	254	2	0	0	0	2
1998–99	Montreal Canadiens	NHL	10	0	0	0	52	—	—	—	—	—
1998–99	Fredericton Canadiens	AHL	39	4	4	8	152	12	0	1	1	31
1999–00	Montreal Canadiens	NHL	1	0	0	0	5	—	—	—	—	—
1999–00	Quebec Citadelles	AHL	47	2	4	6	231	2	0	0	0	0
2000–01	Lake Charles Ice Pirates	WPHL	5	0	2	2	36	—	—	—	—	—
2000–01	London Knights	ISL	13	2	1	3	117	—	—	—	—	—
NHL totals			11	0	0	0	57	—	—	—	—	—
