= Port Huron Border Cats =

- City: Port Huron, Michigan
- League: United Hockey League
- Home arena: McMorran Arena
- Colors: Red, navy, brown

Franchise history
- 1991–1992: Michigan Falcons
- 1992–1996: Detroit Falcons
- 1996–2002: Port Huron Border Cats

The Port Huron Border Cats were a minor professional ice hockey team in the United Hockey League that played from 1996 to 2002. The team was based in Port Huron, Michigan, and played at McMorran Place. The team ceased operations in 2002 and was replaced by another UHL expansion team, the Port Huron Beacons.

== Coaches ==
- Dave Cameron (1996–1997)
- Doug Crossman (1997–1998)
- Greg Puhalski (1998–2000)
- Jean Laforest (2000–2002)

== Season-by-season results ==
Season	GP	W	L	OTL	Pts	GF	GA	PIM	Standing	Playoffs
1996–97	74	38	31	5	81	280	288	2148	3rd, East	Lost in Quarterfinals Smoke 2–3
1997–98	74	31	33	10	72	256	303	1651	3rd, East	Lost in Quarterfinals vs. Smoke 0–4
1998–99	74	41	26	7	89	261	239	1441	2nd, Central	Lost in Quarterfinals vs. Thunder Cats 3–4
1999–00	74	47	21	6	100	269	202	1198	2nd, Central	Lost in Quarterfinals vs. Fury 2–4
2000–01	74	30	34	10	70	234	260	1726	3rd, West	Did not qualify
2001–02	74	27	35	12	66	207	261	1288	6th, East	Did not qualify
