= Stefan Cherneski =

Canadian ice hockey player (born 1978)

- Born: September 19, 1978 (age 48) Winnipeg, Manitoba, Canada
- Height: 6 ft 1 in (185 cm)
- Weight: 200 lb (91 kg; 14 st 4 lb)
- Position: Right wing
- Shot: Left
- Played for: Hartford Wolf Pack
- NHL draft: 19th overall, 1997; New York Rangers
- Playing career: 1998–2001

Stefan Cherneski (born September 19, 1978) is a Canadian former professional ice hockey right winger.

== Early life ==
Cherneski was born in Winnipeg, Manitoba. During his junior career, he played for the Brandon Wheat Kings in the Western Hockey League.

== Career ==
Cherneski was drafted in the first round, 19th overall, by the New York Rangers in the 1997 NHL entry draft. He suffered a fractured right patella on November 13, 1998, and was forced to retire due to the injury on January 2, 2001. He appeared in forty games with the Rangers' American Hockey League affiliate, the Hartford Wolf Pack, before retiring. He tallied just two goals and nine assists in his brief professional career.

== Career statistics ==
			Regular season					Playoffs
Season	Team	League	GP	G	A	Pts	PIM	GP	G	A	Pts	PIM
1995–96	Brandon Wheat Kings	WHL	58	8	21	29	62	19	3	1	4	11
1996–97	Brandon Wheat Kings	WHL	56	39	29	68	83	—	—	—	—	—
1997–98	Brandon Wheat Kings	WHL	65	43	38	81	127	18	15	8	23	21
1998–99	Hartford Wolf Pack	AHL	11	1	2	3	41	−	−	−	−	−
1999–2000	Hartford Wolf Pack	AHL	1	0	0	0	0	—	—	—	—	—
2000–01	Hartford Wolf Pack	AHL	28	1	7	8	43	—	—	—	—	—
WHL totals			179	90	88	178	272	37	18	9	27	32
AHL totals			40	2	9	11	84	–	–	–	–	–

Preceded by Jeff Brown	New York Rangers first-round draft pick 1997	Succeeded by Manny Malhotra
