= Jeff Cowan =

Canadian ice hockey player

- Born: September 27, 1976 (age 49) Scarborough, Ontario, Canada
- Height: 6 ft 2 in (188 cm)
- Weight: 205 lb (93 kg; 14 st 9 lb)
- Position: Left wing
- Shot: Left
- Played for: Calgary Flames; Atlanta Thrashers; Los Angeles Kings; Vancouver Canucks; Iserlohn Roosters
- NHL draft: Undrafted
- Playing career: 1996–2012

Jeff Cowan (born September 27, 1976) is a Canadian former professional ice hockey player. Cowan was a left winger and played 434 games in the National Hockey League (NHL). In 2019, he was named the interim head coach of the Saint John Sea Dogs, a Quebec Major Junior Hockey League team.

== Playing career ==
After coming out of junior hockey in the Ontario Hockey League, Cowan was not drafted in the NHL entry draft; he was signed by the Calgary Flames on October 2, 1995. He would play for the Flames' minor league affiliates (the Roanoke Express of the ECHL and the Saint John Flames of the AHL) for the next few years, before making Calgary's roster in the 1999–2000 NHL season. He would play for the Flames for two seasons before being traded with Kurtis Foster to the Atlanta Thrashers for Petr Buzek on December 18, 2001.

In 2003–04, his third season with the Thrashers, Cowan was enjoying a career year, scoring 9 goals and 24 points through 58 games. However, he was once again traded on March 9, 2004, to the Los Angeles Kings in exchange for Kip Brennan. He finished the season with a career-high 11 goals, 16 assists and 27 points.

On December 30, 2006, the Kings placed Cowan on waivers and was subsequently claimed by the Vancouver Canucks. Towards the end of his first season with Vancouver, Cowan rose to brief prominence, scoring an unexpected 6 goals in 4 games. During that span, a bra was thrown on the ice after his second goal of the game against the Tampa Bay Lightning, coining the moniker "Cowan the Bra-barian". The unique celebration was popularized among fans and in response, the entire Canucks team signed a bra that was auctioned to raise money for breast cancer research.

As the Canucks entered the playoffs as the third seed, Cowan scored the first playoff goal of his NHL career in game one of the second round against the Anaheim Ducks. The following game, he scored the game-winning overtime goal to tie the series 1-1. Vancouver was, however, defeated in five games by Anaheim.

Before the start of the 2007–08 season, Cowan was re-signed by the Canucks to a two-year, $1.45-million contract extension. However, Cowan failed to build on the momentum he had drawn the previous campaign. He was injured early in the season, suffering a strained hip flexor on October 13, 2007, following a fight with the Oilers' Zack Stortini. Shortly after he returned, he was re-injured in a December 9 game against the Pittsburgh Penguins, separating his shoulder on a hit from enforcer Georges Laraque. Cowan finished the season with just 1 assist in 46 games. Shortly before the 2008–09 season, he was put on waivers and cleared. Instead of being assigned to the Canucks' AHL affiliate, the Manitoba Moose, he was sent to the Peoria Rivermen as the Moose had already met their five NHL veteran maximum. On April 30, 2009, Cowan was recalled from Peoria for the Canucks' 2009 playoff run.

On August 20, 2009, Cowan signed a one-year contract with the Buffalo Sabres. While not featuring with the Sabres, Cowan was assigned and played the 2009–10 season, with the Portland Pirates of the AHL. He appeared in 62 games, recording a professional high of 18 goals.

As an unsigned free agent over the summer, on December 17, 2010, Cowan belatedly signed a professional try-out contract with the Toronto Marlies of the AHL, later agreeing to a standard contract for the remainder of the 2010–11 season. On August 12, 2011, Cowan concluded his NHL career by signing his first contract abroad in Europe on a one-year contract to play with the Iserlohn Roosters of the DEL.

== Career statistics ==
| | | | Regular season | | | | | Playoffs |
| Season | Team | League | GP | G | A | Pts | PIM | GP | G | A | Pts | PIM |
|---|---|---|---|---|---|---|---|---|---|---|---|---|
| 1993–94 | Guelph Storm | OHL | 17 | 1 | 0 | 1 | 5 | — | — | — | — | — |
| 1994–95 | Guelph Storm | OHL | 51 | 10 | 7 | 17 | 14 | 14 | 1 | 1 | 2 | 0 |
| 1995–96 | Barrie Colts | OHL | 66 | 38 | 14 | 52 | 29 | 5 | 1 | 2 | 3 | 6 |
| 1996–97 | Roanoke Express | ECHL | 47 | 21 | 13 | 34 | 42 | — | — | — | — | — |
| 1996–97 | Saint John Flames | AHL | 22 | 5 | 5 | 10 | 8 | — | — | — | — | — |
| 1997–98 | Saint John Flames | AHL | 69 | 15 | 13 | 28 | 23 | 13 | 4 | 1 | 5 | 14 |
| 1998–99 | Saint John Flames | AHL | 71 | 7 | 12 | 19 | 117 | 4 | 0 | 1 | 1 | 10 |
| 1999–00 | Saint John Flames | AHL | 47 | 15 | 10 | 25 | 77 | — | — | — | — | — |
| 1999–00 | Calgary Flames | NHL | 13 | 4 | 1 | 5 | 16 | — | — | — | — | — |
| 2000–01 | Calgary Flames | NHL | 51 | 9 | 4 | 13 | 74 | — | — | — | — | — |
| 2001–02 | Calgary Flames | NHL | 19 | 1 | 0 | 1 | 40 | — | — | — | — | — |
| 2001–02 | Atlanta Thrashers | NHL | 38 | 4 | 1 | 5 | 50 | — | — | — | — | — |
| 2002–03 | Atlanta Thrashers | NHL | 66 | 3 | 5 | 8 | 115 | — | — | — | — | — |
| 2003–04 | Atlanta Thrashers | NHL | 58 | 9 | 15 | 24 | 68 | — | — | — | — | — |
| 2003–04 | Los Angeles Kings | NHL | 13 | 2 | 1 | 3 | 24 | — | — | — | — | — |
| 2005–06 | Los Angeles Kings | NHL | 46 | 8 | 1 | 9 | 73 | — | — | — | — | — |
| 2006–07 | Los Angeles Kings | NHL | 21 | 0 | 2 | 2 | 32 | — | — | — | — | — |
| 2006–07 | Vancouver Canucks | NHL | 42 | 7 | 3 | 10 | 93 | 10 | 2 | 0 | 2 | 22 |
| 2007–08 | Vancouver Canucks | NHL | 46 | 0 | 1 | 1 | 110 | — | — | — | — | — |
| 2008–09 | Peoria Rivermen | AHL | 71 | 5 | 10 | 15 | 94 | 7 | 1 | 1 | 2 | 0 |
| 2009–10 | Portland Pirates | AHL | 62 | 18 | 13 | 31 | 57 | 4 | 0 | 0 | 0 | 0 |
| 2010–11 | Toronto Marlies | AHL | 47 | 8 | 8 | 16 | 23 | — | — | — | — | — |
| 2011–12 | Iserlohn Roosters | DEL | 51 | 8 | 6 | 14 | 44 | 2 | 0 | 0 | 0 | 0 |
| NHL totals | | | 413 | 47 | 34 | 81 | 695 | 10 | 2 | 0 | 2 | 22 |
