= Port Huron Flags (UHL) =

- City: Port Huron, Michigan
- League: United Hockey League
- Founded: 2005
- Home arena: McMorran Arena
- Colors: Red, blue, yellow

Franchise history
- 2005–2007: Port Huron Flags

The Port Huron Flags were a minor league professional ice hockey team located in Port Huron, Michigan. The Flags competed in the United Hockey League for two seasons from 2005 to 2007. The Flags' mascot was a bear named Slapshot, based on the Hanson Brothers from the movie Slap Shot.

Owners attempted to sell the Flags in May 2007, but negotiations with several groups failed. The team officially ceased operations on May 18, 2007.

== Season-by-season results ==
Season	GP	W	L	SOL	Pts	GF	GA	PIM	Standing	Playoffs
2005–06	76	23	47	6	52	191	327	2172	5th, Central	Did not qualify
2006–07	76	29	37	10	68	205	257	1793	4th, East	Lost in Quarterfinals vs. Fury 0–4
