= 2005–06 UHL season =

- Finals champions: Kalamazoo Wings

Seasons
- ← 2004–05 2006–07 →

The 2005–06 United Hockey League season was the 15th season of the United Hockey League (Colonial Hockey League before 1997), a North American minor professional league. 14 teams participated in the regular season and the Kalamazoo Wings won the league title.

== Offseason ==
The Port Huron Flags joined as an expansion team. The Flags are named after the IHL team of the same name.

The Port Huron Beacons relocated to Roanoke, Virginia to become the Roanoke Valley Vipers. This came after the Roanoke Express was revoked by the ECHL in 2004.

The Kansas City Outlaws suspended operations and folded due to poor attendance followed by a failed attempt to relocate to Toledo, Ohio and a lawsuit by Superior Color Graphics for non payment.

== Regular season ==
Central Division	GP	W	L	T	GF	GA	Pts
Kalamazoo Wings	76	52	17	7	332	183	111
Muskegon Fury	76	51	18	7	309	245	109
Motor City Mechanics	76	40	30	6	251	246	86
Flint Generals	76	31	35	10	236	294	72
Port Huron Flags	76	23	47	6	191	327	52

Eastern Division	GP	W	L	T	GF	GA	Pts
Danbury Trashers	76	48	17	11	308	227	107
Adirondack Frostbite	76	46	24	6	279	229	98
Richmond RiverDogs	76	40	30	6	251	249	86
Elmira Jackals	76	27	42	7	231	300	61
Roanoke Valley Vipers	76	17	53	6	221	341	40

Western Division	GP	W	L	T	GF	GA	Pts
Rockford IceHogs	76	48	19	9	274	211	105
Fort Wayne Komets	76	44	26	6	246	203	94
Quad City Mallards	76	41	27	8	217	224	90
Missouri River Otters	76	24	45	7	226	228	55

== Colonial Cup-Playoffs ==
Colonial Cup-Quarterfinals
C1	Kalamazoo Wings	4
C3	Motor City Mechanics	0
W1	Rockford IceHogs	4
W2	Fort Wayne Komets	1
E1	Danbury Trashers	4
W3	Quad City Mallards	3
C2	Muskegon Fury	4
E2	Adirondack Frostbite	2

Colonial Cup-Semifinals
C1	Kalamazoo Wings	4
W1	Rockford IceHogs	0
E1	Danbury Trashers	4
C2	Muskegon Fury	2

Colonial Cup-Final
C1	Kalamazoo Wings	4
E1	Danbury Trashers	1
