= 2003–04 UHL season =

- Finals champions: Muskegon Fury

Seasons
- ← 2002–03 2004–05 →

The 2003–04 United Hockey League season was the 13th season of the United Hockey League (Colonial Hockey League before 1997), a North American minor professional league. 12 teams participated in the regular season and the Muskegon Fury won the league title.

== Regular season ==
Eastern Division	GP	W	L	T	GF	GA	Pts
Richmond RiverDogs	76	44	27	5	259	251	93
Flint Generals	76	39	27	10	253	244	88
Port Huron Beacons	76	38	31	7	269	269	83
Elmira Jackals	76	33	34	9	238	256	75
Adirondack IceHawks	76	22	44	10	210	303	54
Columbus Stars	34	19	11	4	102	93	42

Western Division	GP	W	L	T	GF	GA	Pts
Fort Wayne Komets	76	53	17	6	281	180	112
Quad City Mallards	76	50	20	6	287	220	106
Muskegon Fury	76	47	20	9	298	239	103
Kalamazoo Wings	76	45	22	9	281	207	99
Rockford IceHogs	76	28	43	5	215	294	61
Missouri River Otters	76	17	51	8	191	328	42

== Colonial Cup-Playoffs ==
Colonial Cup-Quarterfinals
E2	Flint Generals	0
E3	Port Huron Beacons	3
Eastern Division
E1	Richmond RiverDogs	1
E4	Elmira Jackals	3
W1	Fort Wayne Komets	3
W4	Kalamazoo Wings	2
Western Division
W2	Quad City Mallards	0
W3	Muskegon Fury	3

Colonial Cup-Semifinals
E3	Port Huron Beacons	2
E4	Elmira Jackals	4
W1	Fort Wayne Komets	0
W3	Muskegon Fury	4

Colonial Cup-Final
E4	Elmira Jackals	0
W3	Muskegon Fury	4
