= 2001–02 UHL season =

- Finals champions: Muskegon Fury

Seasons
- ← 2000–01 2002–03 →

The 2001–02 United Hockey League season was the 11th season of the United Hockey League (Colonial Hockey League before 1997), a North American minor professional league. 14 teams participated in the regular season and the Muskegon Fury won the league title.

== Regular season ==
Eastern Division	GP	W	L	T	GF	GA	Pts
Elmira Jackals	74	45	21	8	260	216	98
B.C. Icemen	74	39	27	8	233	237	86
Adirondack IceHawks	74	37	31	6	257	260	80
New Haven Knights	74	34	29	11	259	263	79
Asheville Smoke	74	36	34	4	273	270	76
Port Huron Border Cats	74	27	35	12	207	261	66
Knoxville Speed	74	19	52	3	225	362	41

Western Division	GP	W	L	T	GF	GA	Pts
Quad City Mallards	74	57	15	2	296	175	116
Muskegon Fury	74	48	22	4	233	164	100
Missouri River Otters	74	41	24	9	262	250	91
Flint Generals	74	42	26	6	294	245	90
Fort Wayne Komets	74	37	24	13	227	215	87
Kalamazoo Wings	74	29	37	8	213	277	66
Rockford IceHogs	74	27	41	6	234	278	60

== Colonial Cup-Playoffs ==
Colonial Cup-Quarterfinals
E1	Elmira Jackals	3
E4	New Haven Knights	0
Eastern Division
E2	B.C. Icemen	3
E3	Adirondack IceHawks	2
W1	Quad City Mallards	3
W4	Flint Generals	2
Western Division
W2	Muskegon Fury	3
W3	Missouri River Otters	1

Colonial Cup-Semifinals
E1	Elmira Jackals	4
E2	B. C. Icemen	1
W1	Quad City Mallards	3
W2	Muskegon Fury	4

Colonial Cup-Final
E1	Elmira Jackals	2
W2	Muskegon Fury	4
