= Roanoke Valley Vipers =

- City: Roanoke, Virginia
- League: United Hockey League
- Founded: 2002
- Home arena: Roanoke Civic Center
- Colors: Purple, silver, black, white

Franchise history
- 2002–2005: Port Huron Beacons
- 2005–2006: Roanoke Valley Vipers

The Roanoke Valley Vipers were a minor professional ice hockey team located in Roanoke, Virginia. They were a member of the United Hockey League and played in the Roanoke Civic Center.

The franchise was formed in 2002 as the Port Huron Beacons and played in McMorran Arena in Port Huron, Michigan, through the end of the 2004–05 season. The franchise was relocated to Roanoke for the 2005–06 season, filling the void left after the ECHL's Roanoke Express disbanded and to provide a travel partner near the Richmond RiverDogs. While professional ice hockey had been previously played and successful in the Virginian towns of Roanoke, Salem and Vinton since 1967, the Vipers were unsuccessful on and off the ice with a losing record in their lone season in Virginia and an average attendance of about 1,000 fans in an arena with a capacity of over 9,000. Local fans complained about high ticket prices and a lower level of play than the ECHL. The midwestern focus of the UHL also made rivalries less intense than they had been with the southeastern and mid-Atlantic teams of the ECHL. The owners and their marketing plans were frequently criticized by local media.

The Vipers folded on May 15, 2006, shortly after the RiverDogs moved to Chicago and became the Chicago Hounds.

== Notable players ==
- David-Alexandre Beauregard
- Matt Elich
- Alexander Erofeev
