= Port Huron Beacons =

- City: Port Huron, Michigan
- League: United Hockey League
- Founded: 2002
- Home arena: McMorran Arena
- Colors: Blue, yellow, red, white

Franchise history
- 2002–2005: Port Huron Beacons
- 2005–2006: Roanoke Valley Vipers

The Port Huron Beacons were a minor league professional ice hockey team in the United Hockey League (UHL) that played from 2002 to 2005. The team was based in Port Huron, Michigan, and played at the McMorran Arena.

The team's first head coach was Brad Jones, a former National Hockey League player and head coach of the UHL's B.C. Icemen. The team's first President and General manager was Kevin J. Carr from 2000 to 2004. Jones resigned in February 2003 with a 24–24–5 record and was replaced by Bruce Ramsey for the remainder of the season.

Ramsey returned as head coach for the 2003–04 season and led the team to the semifinals in the playoffs, but was fired in the following offseason. The Beacons then hired former NHL player Mark Kumpel, but he resigned without coaching a game and was replaced by Rick Adduono, the former head coach of the Greensboro Generals, for the 2004–05 season. Gino Giacumbo served as vice president in 2003–04 and as general manager in 2004–05.

The Beacons departed in 2005 to become the Roanoke Valley Vipers.

== Season-by-season results ==
Season	GP	W	L	SOL	Pts	GF	GA	PIM	Standing	Playoffs
2002–03	76	38	30	8	84	248	268	1413	4th, Eastern	Lost in quarterfinals Komets 0–3
2003–04	76	38	31	7	83	269	269	1495	3rd, Eastern	Won in quarterfinals Generals 3–0; Lost in semifinals Jackals 2–4
2004–05	80	34	40	6	74	245	283	1623	5th, Central	Did not qualify
