= 2006–07 UHL season =

- Finals champions: Rockford IceHogs

Seasons
- ← 2005–06 2007–08 →

The 2006–07 United Hockey League season was the 16th season of the United Hockey League (Colonial Hockey League before 1997), a North American minor professional league. Ten teams participated in the regular season and the Rockford IceHogs won the league title.

== Offseason ==
The Bloomington PrairieThunder launched as an expansion team.

The Motor City Mechanics announced it would suspend operations for the 2006–07 season.

The Richmond Riverdogs relocated to Chicago to become the Chicago Hounds after missing opportunities to renew their lease at Richmond Coliseum.

The Missouri River Otters folded due to poor attendance, issues with Family Arena and steep workman's comp bill

The Roanoke Valley Vipers folded due to poor attendance, complaints of ticket sales, criticism of owners and marketing and declining local interest in the area.

The Adirondack Frostbite suspended operations after failing to reach an agreement with the Glens Falls Civic Center.

The Danbury Trashers folded after their owner was arrested on 72 charges, pleaded guilty to the charges and was sentenced to 87 months in prison.

== Regular season ==
Eastern Division	GP	W	L	T	GF	GA	Pts
Muskegon Fury	76	49	21	6	275	207	104
Kalamazoo Wings	76	47	23	6	251	191	100
Flint Generals	76	33	34	9	250	286	75
Port Huron Flags	76	29	37	10	205	257	68
Elmira Jackals	76	30	45	1	217	287	61

Western Division	GP	W	L	T	GF	GA	Pts
Fort Wayne Komets	76	51	21	4	263	187	106
Rockford IceHogs	76	48	21	7	266	193	103
Quad City Mallards	76	37	28	11	269	264	85
Chicago Hounds	76	31	38	7	221	261	69
Bloomington PrairieThunder	76	25	45	6	201	285	56

== Colonial Cup-Playoffs ==
Colonial Cup-Quarterfinals
E1	Muskegon	4
E4	Port Huron	0
Eastern Division
E2	Kalamazoo	4
E3	Flint	2
W1	Fort Wayne	4
W4	Chicago	1
Western Division
W2	Rockford	4
W3	Quad City	1

Colonial Cup-Semifinals
E1	Muskegon	3
E2	Kalamazoo	4
W1	Fort Wayne	1
W2	Rockford	4

Colonial Cup-Final
E2	Kalamazoo	3
W2	Rockford	4
