= 2002–03 UHL season =

- Finals champions: Fort Wayne Komets

Seasons
- ← 2001–02 2003–04 →

The 2002–03 United Hockey League season was the 12th season of the United Hockey League (Colonial Hockey League before 1997), a North American minor professional league. Ten teams participated in the regular season and the Fort Wayne Komets won the league title.

== Offseason ==
The Port Huron Border Cats ceased operations and were replaced with a new franchise named the Port Huron Beacons.

The Knoxville Speed folded after the team went bankrupt.

The Asheville Smoke folded despite efforts to save the team due to poor attendance and the Asheville Civic Center being outdated

The B.C. Icemen declared bankruptcy and was sold to local owners who launched an expansion team in the AHL named Binghamton Senators.

The New Haven Knights folded because their home arena, the New Haven Coliseum closed.

== Regular season ==
Eastern Division	GP	W	L	T	GF	GA	Pts
Fort Wayne Komets	76	44	21	11	249	191	99
Adirondack IceHawks	76	44	28	4	300	245	92
Elmira Jackals	76	41	28	7	257	254	89
Port Huron Beacons	76	38	30	8	248	268	84
Flint Generals	76	32	36	8	257	298	72

Western Division	GP	W	L	T	GF	GA	Pts
Quad City Mallards	76	41	25	10	281	240	92
Missouri River Otters	76	38	28	10	262	236	86
Muskegon Fury	76	38	29	9	245	257	85
Rockford IceHogs	76	35	34	7	233	271	77
Kalamazoo Wings	76	29	39	8	210	282	66

== Colonial Cup-Playoffs ==
Colonial Cup-Quarterfinals
E1	Fort Wayne Komets	3
E4	Port Huron Beacons	0
Eastern Division
E2	Adirondack Icehawks	1
E3	Elmira Jackals	3
W1	Quad City Mallards	3
W4	Rockford IceHogs	0
Western Division
W2	Missouri River Otters	0
W3	Muskegon Fury	3

Colonial Cup-Semifinals
E1	Fort Wayne Komets	4
E3	Elmira Jackals	0
W1	Quad City Mallards	4
W3	Muskegon Fury	2

Colonial Cup-Final
E1	Fort Wayne Komets	4
W1	Quad City Mallards	1
