= Missouri River Otters =

- City: St. Charles, Missouri
- League: United Hockey League
- Founded: 1999
- Home arena: Family Arena
- Colors: Blue, green, brown
- Owner(s): Mike Shanahan, Jr
- General manager: Frank Buonomo

Franchise history
- 1999–2006: Missouri River Otters

The Missouri River Otters were a minor professional ice hockey team based in St. Charles, Missouri. They played in the United Hockey League from 1999 to 2006. They played their home games at the St. Charles Family Arena, which also opened in October 1999.

== History ==
The River Otters were launched in the United Hockey League (UHL) for the 1999–2000 season owned by New York-based United Sports Ventures, an organization that operated several teams in the league. The team's first head coach was former St. Louis Blues' player Mark Reeds and they had their home opener on October 23, 1999, with a sellout attendance for a 6–2 win over the Asheville Smoke. Lonnie Loach, who wore #33, played for the team from 1999 to 2003 and is the only person to have his number retired by the team.

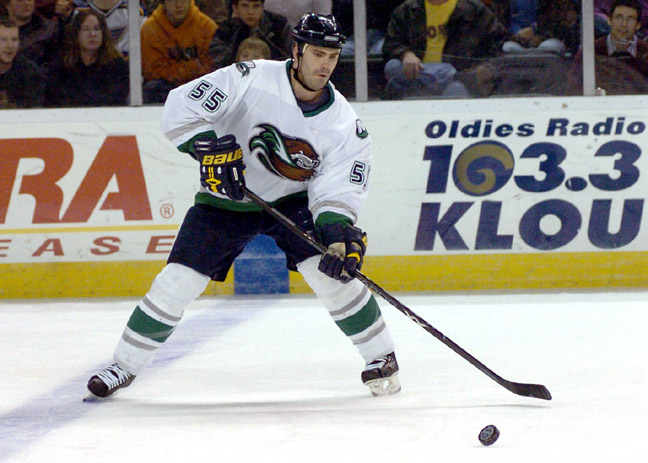
Barret Jackman of the St. Louis Blues wore jersey #55 with the River Otters

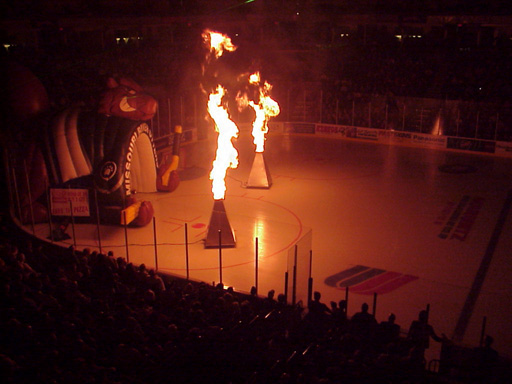
The River Otters players portal to the ice (1999)

The team was sold in December 2001 to local ownership group River City Hockey LLC. consisting of Kevin Fitzpatrick, Dan O'Donnell, and David Black. The team was purchased by Mike Shanahan Jr. in 2004. During the National Hockey League (NHL) lockout in 2004–05, NHL defenseman Barret Jackman decided to stay in St. Louis and play hockey for the River Otters during the lockout, along with center Ryan Johnson, defenseman Bryce Salvador and right winger Jamal Mayers. The team also signed former NHL players such as Jim Montgomery and Dennis Vial during this season.

On January 25, 2006, the Missouri River Otters hosted the 2006 United Hockey League All Star Classic, which included events such as an UHL alumni vs. St. Louis Blues alumni pre-game show to raise money for St. Louis Children's Hospital. In late April 2006, team owner and president Mike Shanahan Jr. decided to fold the team due to lack of attendance, issues with the lease at the Family Arena, and a steep workers' compensation bill. The staff was then let go as the announcement was made that the team would not play in the upcoming 2006–07 UHL season. While leaving open the possibility of a sale, Shanahan said that the competition for the sports dollar in the greater St. Louis area meant that the team would likely fold instead of being sold.
