= List of Roller Hockey International arenas =

The following is a list of Roller Hockey International (RHI) arenas.

== Defunct teams ==
Defunct Teams Arenas
Team (years in RHI)	Arena	Years Used	Capacity	Opened	City	Reference
Anaheim Bullfrogs (1993–1999)	Arrowhead Pond of Anaheim	1993–1999	17,174	1993	Anaheim, California	
Calgary Rad'z (1993–1994)	Max Bell Centre	1993–1994	2,121		Calgary, AB	
Calgary Rad'z (1993–1994)	Olympic Saddledome	1993	19,289	1983	Calgary, AB	
Sacramento River Rats (1994–1997) (Connecticut Coasters) (1993)	ARCO Arena (1994–1996); Cal Expo Amphitheatre (1997)	1994–1997	10,632	1988	Sacramento, California	
Sacramento River Rats (1994–1997) (Connecticut Coasters) (1993)	New Haven Coliseum	1993	11,171	1972	New Haven, Connecticut	
Florida Hammerheads (1993–1994)	Miami Arena	1993–1994	14,696	1988	Miami	
Los Angeles Blades (1993–1997)	Great Western Forum; The Forum (1967–1988, 2003–present)	1993–1997	16,005	1967	Inglewood, California	
Oakland Skates (1993–1996)	Kaiser Convention Center; Oakland Auditorium (1914–1984)	1996	5,492	1914	Oakland, California	
Oakland Skates (1993–1996)	Oakland–Alameda County Coliseum Arena; Oracle Arena (2006–present); Oakland Arena (2004–2006); The Arena in Oakland (1997–2004)	1993–1995	17,000	1966	Oakland, California	
Portland Rage (1993–1994)	Memorial Coliseum	1993–1994	10,888	1960	Portland, Oregon	
San Diego Barracudas (1993–1996)	San Diego Sports Arena 'iPayOne Center (2004–2007)	1993–1996	12,920	1966	San Diego	
St. Louis Vipers (1993–1999)	Kiel Center; Scottrade Center (2006–present); Savvis Center (2000–2006)	1995–1999	19,250	1994	St. Louis	
St. Louis Vipers (1993–1999)	St. Louis Arena; The Checkerdome (1977–1983)	1993–1994	20,000	1929	St. Louis	
Toronto Planets (1993)	Varsity Arena	1993	4,116	1926	Toronto	
Las Vegas Flash (1994) (Utah Rollerbees) (1993)	Thomas & Mack Center	1994	16,606	1983	Paradise, Nevada	
Las Vegas Flash (1994) (Utah Rollerbees) (1993)	South Towne Center	1993	n/a	n/a	Sandy, Utah	
Vancouver Voodoo (1993–1996)	General Motors Place; Rogers Arena (2010–present); Canada Hockey Place during 2010 Winter Olympics	1996	18,810	1995	Vancouver, BC	
Vancouver Voodoo (1993–1996)	Pacific Coliseum	1994–1995	16,281	1968	Vancouver, BC	
Vancouver Voodoo (1993–1996)	PNE Agrodome	1993–1994	3,260	1963	Vancouver, BC	
Las Vegas Coyotes (1999) (Oklahoma Coyotes) (1995–1996) (Atlanta Fire Ants) (1994)	Santa Fe Ice Arena	1999	n/a	n/a	Las Vegas	
Las Vegas Coyotes (1999) (Oklahoma Coyotes) (1995–1996) (Atlanta Fire Ants) (1994)	Myriad Convention Center; Cox Convention Center (2002–present)	1995–1996	13,399	1972	Oklahoma City	
Las Vegas Coyotes (1999) (Oklahoma Coyotes) (1995–1996) (Atlanta Fire Ants) (1994)	Omni Coliseum	1994	15,278	1972	Atlanta	
Buffalo Stampede (1994–1995)	Buffalo Memorial Auditorium	1994–1995	16,433	1940	Buffalo, New York	
Chicago Cheetahs (1994–1995)	Odeum Expo Center	1995	3,500	n/a	Villa Park, Illinois	
Chicago Cheetahs (1994–1995)	UIC Pavilion	1994	6,958	1982	Chicago	
Orlando Jackals (1996–1997) (Orlando Rollergators) (1995) (Edmonton Sled Dogs) (1994)	Orlando Arena; Amway Arena (2006–present); TD Waterhouse Centre (2000–2006)	1995–1997	15,948	1989	Orlando, Florida	
Orlando Jackals (1996–1997) (Orlando Rollergators) (1995) (Edmonton Sled Dogs) (1994)	Northlands Coliseum; Rexall Place (2003–present); Skyreach Centre (1998–2003); Edmonton Coliseum (1995–1998)	1994	16,839	1974	Edmonton	
Minnesota Arctic Blast (1994, 1996)	Target Center	1994, 1996	19,500	1990	Minneapolis	
Montreal Roadrunners (1994–1997)	Molson Centre; Bell Centre (2002–present)	1996–1997	21,273	1996	Montreal	
Montreal Roadrunners (1994–1997)	Montreal Forum	1994–1995	17,959	1924	Montreal	
Ottawa Wheels (1997) (Ottawa Loggers) (1995–1997) (New England Stingers) (1994)	Corel Centre; Scotiabank Place (2006–present); The Palladium (1996)	1995–1997	19,153	1996	Ottawa, ON	
Ottawa Wheels (1997) (Ottawa Loggers) (1995–1997) (New England Stingers) (1994)	Cumberland County Civic Center	1994	7,005	1977	Portland, Maine	
New Jersey Rockin' Rollers (1994–1997)	Continental Airlines Arena; Izod Center (2007–present); Brendan Byrne Arena (1981–1996)	1994–1997	19,040	1981	East Rutherford, New Jersey	
Philadelphia Bulldogs (1994–1996)	CoreStates Spectrum; Wachovia Spectrum (2003–2009); First Union Spectrum (1998–2003); Spectrum (1967–1994)	1994–1996	17,380	1967	Philadelphia	
Tampa Bay Tritons (1994)	Expo Hall	1994	10,425	n/a	Tampa, Florida	
Buffalo Wings (1997–1999) (Empire State Cobras) (1996) (Phoenix Cobras) (1994–1995)	Buffalo State Sports Arena	1999	1,800	1991	Buffalo, New York	
Buffalo Wings (1997–1999) (Empire State Cobras) (1996) (Phoenix Cobras) (1994–1995)	Marine Midland Arena; HSBC Arena (1999–present)	1997	18,690	1996	Buffalo, New York	
Buffalo Wings (1997–1999) (Empire State Cobras) (1996) (Phoenix Cobras) (1994–1995)	Glens Falls Civic Center	1996	4,806	1979	Glens Falls, New York	
Buffalo Wings (1997–1999) (Empire State Cobras) (1996) (Phoenix Cobras) (1994–1995)	Arizona Veterans Memorial Coliseum	1994–1995	13,730	1965	Phoenix, Arizona	

== See also ==
- Roller Hockey International
- List of U.S. stadiums by capacity
