= Las Vegas Coyotes =

- City: Las Vegas, Nevada
- Founded: 1994
- Home arena: Ice Arena at the Santa Fe Hotel
- Colors: Red, Gold, Black
- Murphy Cups: None
- Conference Championships: None
- Division Championships: None

Franchise history
- Atlanta Fire Ants (1994) Oklahoma Coyotes (1995–1996) Las Vegas Coyotes (1999)

The Las Vegas Coyotes were an inline hockey team which competed in Roller Hockey International. The team was founded as the Atlanta Fire Ants in 1994 and had a two-season stint in Oklahoma City before the team relocated to Las Vegas. The team's home games were played at the Ice Arena at the Santa Fe Hotel and the team folded following the dissolution of the RHI after the 1999 season. The Coyotes were the second attempt by the RHI to field a team in the Las Vegas Valley, the Coyotes predecessor, the Las Vegas Flash, played one season in the league.

== Franchise history ==
=== Atlanta Fire Ants (1994) ===
The Atlanta Fire Ants began play during the 1994 season, one of twelve expansion franchises as the RHI doubled its membership for their second season. The Fire Ants played their home games at the Omni Coliseum in downtown Atlanta and were members of the Central Division of the Eastern Conference with the Chicago Cheetahs, Minnesota Arctic Blast, New England Stingers, Pittsburgh Phantoms and St. Louis Vipers. The Fire Ants would finish the season with a record of 10–10–2, finishing in fourth place in the Central Division and narrowly qualifying for the Murphy Cup playoffs as the eighth and final seed. The Fire Ants were swept in the best-of-three game Central Division semifinals against Minnesota, losing Game One 14–4 and Game Two 9–8. The Fire Ants would finish their only season in Atlanta averaging 3,388 spectators in eleven home games, ranking 16th out of the 24 teams.

=== Oklahoma Coyotes (1995–1996) ===
Following the 1994 season, the Fire Ants were one of three teams (New England to Ottawa, Ontario and the Edmonton Sled Dogs to Orlando, Florida) to relocate prior to the 1995 season. The Fire Ants were moved to Oklahoma City, Oklahoma and the Myriad Convention Center, changing their name to the Oklahoma Coyotes in the process. With the relocation, the Coyotes moved to the Pacific Division of the Western Conference with the Anaheim Bullfrogs, Los Angeles Blades, Phoenix Cobras and San Diego Barracudas. Despite Left Winger Doug Lawrence leading the league in scoring, the Coyotes would finish the season in last place in the Pacific Division with a record of 7–17–0 and missing the Murphy Cup playoffs. Though the team's season was not very successful, the Coyotes did have two players, Lawrence and Scott Drevitch selected for the 1995 All-Star Game in St. Louis. Both players started the game and Lawrence was named the Western Conference's captain for the game. Lawrence would provide a goal and three assists and Drevitch added a goal and two assists, though the Western Conference would lose to the Eastern Conference, 14–12.

The Coyotes would see an improvement in their second season in Oklahoma City, posting a record of 13–12–3 finishing third in the Pacific Division. Though the Coyotes had the fifth best record in the Western Conference, an accomplishment that would have qualified the team for the playoffs in previous seasons, the RHI's new playoff format for the 1996 season allowed only the top two teams from each of the league's four divisions to qualify for the Murphy Cup playoffs. For the second season, the Coyotes would send two players to the RHI's All-Star Game, this time being Radek Hamr and Joe Burton. Hamr would provide one assist while Burton scored a goal in the Western Conference's 14–12 victory at the Arrowhead Pond in Anaheim, California.

At the conclusion of the 1996 season, the Coyotes suspended operations as the organization looked for a new home.

=== Relocation to Las Vegas ===
After spending the 1997 season in dormancy and a failed attempt to move the team to Phoenix, Arizona, the Coyotes organization announced that the team would move to Las Vegas, Nevada, for the 1998 season and play at the Thomas & Mack Center, the former home of the RHI's Las Vegas Flash in 1994. The Coyotes were set to make their return to the RHI, when the league announced that it was going to suspend the 1998 season in order to make a public stock offering and raise money for a season in 1999. The Coyotes, who had planned to play at the Thomas & Mack Center, announced that they planned to play their games at a proposed 6,500-seat sports facility in North Las Vegas named The Millennium. The Coyotes and the RHI returned for a season in 1999. The Coyotes played in the four team Western Conference with RHI stalwarts Anaheim and the San Jose Rhinos, and the expansion Dallas Stallions. The RHI was an eight-team league for 1999, with the Eastern Conference hosting former RHI clubs Buffalo Wings, Minnesota Blue Ox and St. Louis Vipers, along with the expansion Chicago Bluesmen. Prior to their inaugural season in Las Vegas, the Coyotes switched venues again and played at the 1,500-seat Ice Arena at the Santa Fe Hotel in northwest Las Vegas. The team announced that it would be led by former Las Vegas Thunder head coach Chris McSorley. After sweeping a four-game road trip to start the season, the Coyotes lost their home opener 4–3 in a shootout against San Jose in front of more than 1,200 spectators. Though the Coyotes were impressive in the rink, posting a 9–0–1 record in their first ten games, the team was not drawing well and was one of five teams in the eight-team league that were unable to average attendance of at least 1,000 per game.

As the season moved on, the Coyotes posted a 16–7–3 record, finishing in second place in the Western Conference and earning a berth in the Murphy Cup playoffs, all while the team suffered through lack of coverage from the local media. At the Murphy Cup playoffs in Anaheim, the Coyotes lost in the Division Semifinals to San Jose, 6–5. Following the season, the team looked to move from the Santa Fe Ice Arena, possibly to the All-American Sports Park off the south side of the Las Vegas Strip, but the plan never came to fruition. The Coyotes did not return to the rink as the league suspended the 2000 season and finally ceased operations in 2001.

== Season-by-season record ==
Murphy Cup Champions †	Murphy Cup finalists *	Division champions ^	Playoff appearance ¤

Season	Conference	Division	Regular Season^{[a]}								Post Season^{[b]}					
Season	Conference	Division	Finish	GP	W	L	OTL	Pts	GF	GA	GP	W	L	GF	GA	Result
Atlanta Fire Ants
1994	Eastern	Central	4th ¤	22	10	10	2	22	168	190	2	0	2	11	22	Lost in Division semifinals, 0-2 (Minnesota)
Oklahoma Coyotes
1995	Western	Pacific	5th	24	7	17	0	14	159	209	–	–	–	–	–	did not qualify
1996	Western	Pacific	3rd	28	13	12	3	29	174	174	–	–	–	–	–	did not qualify
Las Vegas Coyotes
1999	Western		2nd ¤	26	16	7	3	35	144	123	1	0	1	5	6	Lost in Division semifinals, 0-1 (San Jose)
Totals				100	46	46	8	.500	645	696	3	0	3	16	28	—

Notes:
a Code explanation; GP—Games Played, W—Wins, L—Losses, T—Overtime/Shootout losses (worth one point), GF—Goals For, GA—Goals Against, Pts—Points
b The result of the playoff series with Coyotes' result first no matter of the outcome, followed by opposite team in parentheses.
