= Kyle Reeves =

Canadian ice hockey right wingers

- Born: May 12, 1971 (age 55) Swan River, Manitoba, Canada
- Height: 6 ft 0 in (183 cm)
- Weight: 200 lb (91 kg; 14 st 4 lb)
- Position: Right wing
- Shot: Right
- Played for: Peoria Rivermen; Fort Wayne Komets; Utah Grizzlies
- NHL draft: 64th overall, 1991; St. Louis Blues
- Playing career: 1991–2003

Kyle Reeves (born May 12, 1971) is a Canadian former professional ice hockey right winger.

Reeves played junior hockey in the Western Hockey League for the Swift Current Broncos and the Tri-City Americans between 1988 and 1991. He was drafted 64th overall by the St. Louis Blues in the 1991 NHL entry draft and spent three seasons with their International Hockey League affiliate the Peoria Rivermen, from 1991 to 1994 though he was unable to break into the St. Louis roster.

Reeves also played roller hockey for six years. He first played in Roller Hockey International for the Orlando Rollergators and Motor City Mustangs in 1995 and then the Orlando Jackals for two seasons in 1996 and 1997. With the RHI ceasing operations in 1998, Reeves played with the Orlando Surge in Major League Roller Hockey that summer before returning to the revived RHI in the 1999 season with the Minnesota Blue Ox, in what would be the league's final season before folding for good in 2001.

== Awards ==
- WHL West Second All-Star Team – 1991
