= Mark Major =

Canadian hockey player and coach

- Born: March 20, 1970 (age 55) Toronto, Ontario, Canada
- Height: 6 ft 4 in (193 cm)
- Weight: 216 lb (98 kg; 15 st 6 lb)
- Position: Left wing
- Shot: Left
- Played for: Detroit Red Wings
- NHL draft: 25th overall, 1988; Pittsburgh Penguins
- Playing career: 1990–2004

Mark Major (born March 20, 1970) is a Canadian former professional ice hockey left winger. He played two games in the National Hockey League with the Detroit Red Wings during the 1996–97 season. He was drafted 25th overall by the Pittsburgh Penguins in the 1988 NHL entry draft. Major acquired many penalty minutes over his career due to his playing style, which involved battling in front of the net for loose pucks, scoring garbage goals, and blocking the goaltenders view. Major only played in two NHL games, for the Detroit Red Wings. He also enjoyed a short career as a professional inline hockey player in Roller Hockey International (RHI). Taking into account all of his hockey games played at a professional level, Major played in 1,339 games and acquired 4,334 penalty minutes, giving Major an average of 3.24 penalty minutes per game during his career. After 4 seasons and 2 Championships as head coach of the Amherstview Jets Junior A team, Major is taking a year off to help coach his daughter's Kingston Ice Wolves' Peewee AA team.

== Professional career ==
=== Junior and early minor-league career ===
Major started receiving attention from NHL scouts while playing for the Don Mills Flyers of the MTHL in 1986. He advanced to the North Bay Centennials of the Ontario Hockey League for the 1987–88 season and put up 33 points in 57 games to go along with a whopping 272 penalty minutes (PIM). Major averaged almost 5 penalty minutes a game, but his hard-nosed style was admired by NHL scouts and Major was selected 25th overall by the Pittsburgh Penguins in the 1988 NHL entry draft. Now as an NHL prospect, Major gained confidence and began the 1988–89 season again with the Centennials before being traded 11 games into the Kingston Raiders. He would remain in Kingston for that season and the next (when they were renamed the Kingston Frontenacs), scoring 112 points and 361 PIMs, before moving up to the Muskegon Lumberjacks of the International Hockey League. Major remained with the Lumberjacks for three seasons, scoring 77 points and 617 PIMs. He led the team in penalties during the 1991–92 season with 302 and would add another 29 PIMs in the Lumberjacks' playoff run which saw them lose four games to none in the finals to the Kansas City Blades. After his last season with the Lumberjacks, that included relocation to Cleveland, Major was let go by the parent club Pittsburgh and quickly signed as a free agent by the Boston Bruins on July 22, 1993.

Major started play with Boston's affiliate the Providence Bruins of the American Hockey League. He scored 26 points along with 176 PIMs during the 1993–94 season, but Providence failed to make the playoffs. He was let go by the Bruins, and joined the Detroit Vipers of the IHL for the following season. He continued to play aggressively, with his 36 points and 229 PIMs helping push the Vipers into the playoffs, but his play couldn't help them past the second round.

Major again caught the attention of an NHL team, when the Detroit Red Wings signed him as a free agent on June 26, 1995. He began play for the Adirondack Red Wings of the AHL in the 1995–96 season and scored 29 points while racking up 234 PIMs for second on the team. He was known as a player who wouldn't back down from a fight, and he was involved in several fights during Adirondack's short playoff run that season, receiving 21 PIMs in just three games.

=== NHL appearance ===
Major received his first shot in the big leagues during the 1996–97 NHL season when he was brought up from Adirondack for two games starting on November 2, 1996. In his first game, halfway through the second period, Major fought veteran instigator Tie Domi of the Toronto Maple Leafs. Major held his own against Domi but was rewarded with a bloody nose and a five-minute major. Major played the following night and failed to impress the Detroit staff, which resulted in him being sent back down to the minors. Finishing the season with Adirondack, and leading the team in PIMs with 213, Major was let go by Detroit.

=== Late minor-league career ===
Major still had NHL interest and was quickly signed as a free agent on August 20, 1997, by the Washington Capitals. He started out in their farm system playing for the Portland Pirates of the AHL. In his first season, Major was first on his team and second in the league for penalty minutes with 355. This was his career-high for PIMs in a season and as of 2007, he still holds the team record for penalty minutes in a single season. Major wasn't finished with 355 and added 52 more PIMs in 10 playoff games that year. The following season he again led the team in PIMs and saw his point production decrease to only nine points in 66 games. He was let go by Washington and began play for the Houston Aeros of the IHL in 1999. After just 20 games (with 81 PIMs), Major was signed as a free agent by the Flint Generals of the United Hockey League. He was named team captain and finished out the 1999–00 season with the Generals scoring 41 points, his highest point total in years, and helped the team win the Colonial Cup. He put up great numbers the following season when he finished with 46 points and 163 PIMs. Generals coach Billy Thurlow had this to say about Major's style of play:

Anytime he's on the ice, people have to respect us. Nobody's going to shove us around.

He would also go on to join the AHL's Hershey Bears for two games in the 2000–01 season. In 2001, he joined the Wheeling Nailers of the East Coast Hockey League and would go on to score 84 points in two seasons with the Nailers. The coach, John Brophy, had this to say about Major returning for his second season in Wheeling:

We are very fortunate to have Mark return to the Nailers, not only are we getting a great player and a natural team leader, but a guy who is good in the community and represents the Nailers and Penguins organizations with class.

The 2003–04 season would be Major's last, playing in 40 games for the Laval Chiefs of the QSMHL and 12 games for the Kalamazoo Wings of the UHL.

=== Playing inline hockey ===
Major was also an active member of the Roller Hockey International League for its entire lifespan. Major played on the Buffalo Stampede in 1994 and 1995, winning the Murphy Cup in 1994. He joined the Empire State Cobras in 1996 and the New Jersey Rockin' Rollers in 1997. When the RHI folded in 1997, Major continued playing with the Buffalo Wings of Major League Roller Hockey in 1998 and joined the newly re-formed Roller Hockey International with Buffalo in 1999. The league folded for good after the 1999 season.

== Career statistics ==
=== Regular season and playoffs ===
			Regular season					Playoffs
Season	Team	League	GP	G	A	Pts	PIM	GP	G	A	Pts	PIM
1987–88	North Bay Centennials	OHL	57	16	17	33	272	4	0	2	2	8
1988–89	North Bay Centennials	OHL	11	3	2	5	58	—	—	—	—	—
1988–89	Kingston Raiders	OHL	53	22	29	51	193	—	—	—	—	—
1989–90	Kingston Frontenacs	OHL	62	29	32	61	168	6	3	3	6	12
1990–91	Muskegon Lumberjacks	IHL	60	8	10	18	160	5	0	0	0	0
1991–92	Muskegon Lumberjacks	IHL	80	13	18	31	302	12	1	3	4	29
1992–93	Cleveland Lumberjacks	IHL	82	13	15	28	155	3	0	0	0	0
1993–94	Providence Bruins	AHL	61	17	9	26	176	—	—	—	—	—
1994–95	Detroit Vipers	IHL	78	17	19	36	229	5	0	1	1	23
1995–96	Adirondack Red Wings	AHL	78	10	19	29	234	3	0	0	0	21
1996–97	Adirondack Red Wings	AHL	78	17	18	35	213	4	0	0	0	13
1996–97	Detroit Red Wings	NHL	2	0	0	0	5	—	—	—	—	—
1997–98	Portland Pirates	AHL	79	13	2	15	355	10	2	1	3	52
1998–99	Portland Pirates	AHL	66	5	4	9	250	—	—	—	—	—
1999–00	Houston Aeros	IHL	20	1	0	1	81	—	—	—	—	—
1999–00	Flint Generals	UHL	36	23	18	41	135	15	8	3	11	67
2000–01	Flint Generals	UHL	53	16	30	46	163	—	—	—	—	—
2000–01	Hershey Bears	AHL	2	0	0	0	10	—	—	—	—	—
2001–02	Wheeling Nailers	ECHL	71	26	19	45	102	—	—	—	—	—
2002–03	Wheeling Nailers	ECHL	68	17	22	39	135	—	—	—	—	—
2003–04	Laval Chiefs	QSMHL	40	14	12	26	149	5	1	3	4	15
2003–04	Kalamazoo Wings	UHL	12	5	4	9	33	5	1	1	2	9
AHL totals			364	62	52	114	1238	17	2	1	3	86
IHL totals			320	52	62	114	927	25	1	4	5	52
NHL totals			2	0	0	0	5	—	—	—	—	—

=== Roller hockey ===
			Regular season
Season	Team	League	GP	G	A	Pts	PIM
1994	Buffalo Stampede	RHI	21	18	14	32	63
1995	Buffalo Stampede	RHI	23	17	20	37	97
1996	Empire State Cobras	RHI	23	11	19	30	98
1997	New Jersey Rockin' Rollers	RHI	10	8	8	16	73
1998	Buffalo Wings	MLRH	13	21	10	31	85
1999	Buffalo Wings	RHI	23	24	34	58	111
Career totals			113	99	105	204	527

== Awards and achievements ==
- Murphy Cup Champion: 1994 (Buffalo Stampede – RHI)
- Colonial Cup Champion: 2000 (Flint Generals – UHL)
