= McNichols Sports Arena =

Demolished indoor arena in Denver, Colorado

- Big Mac
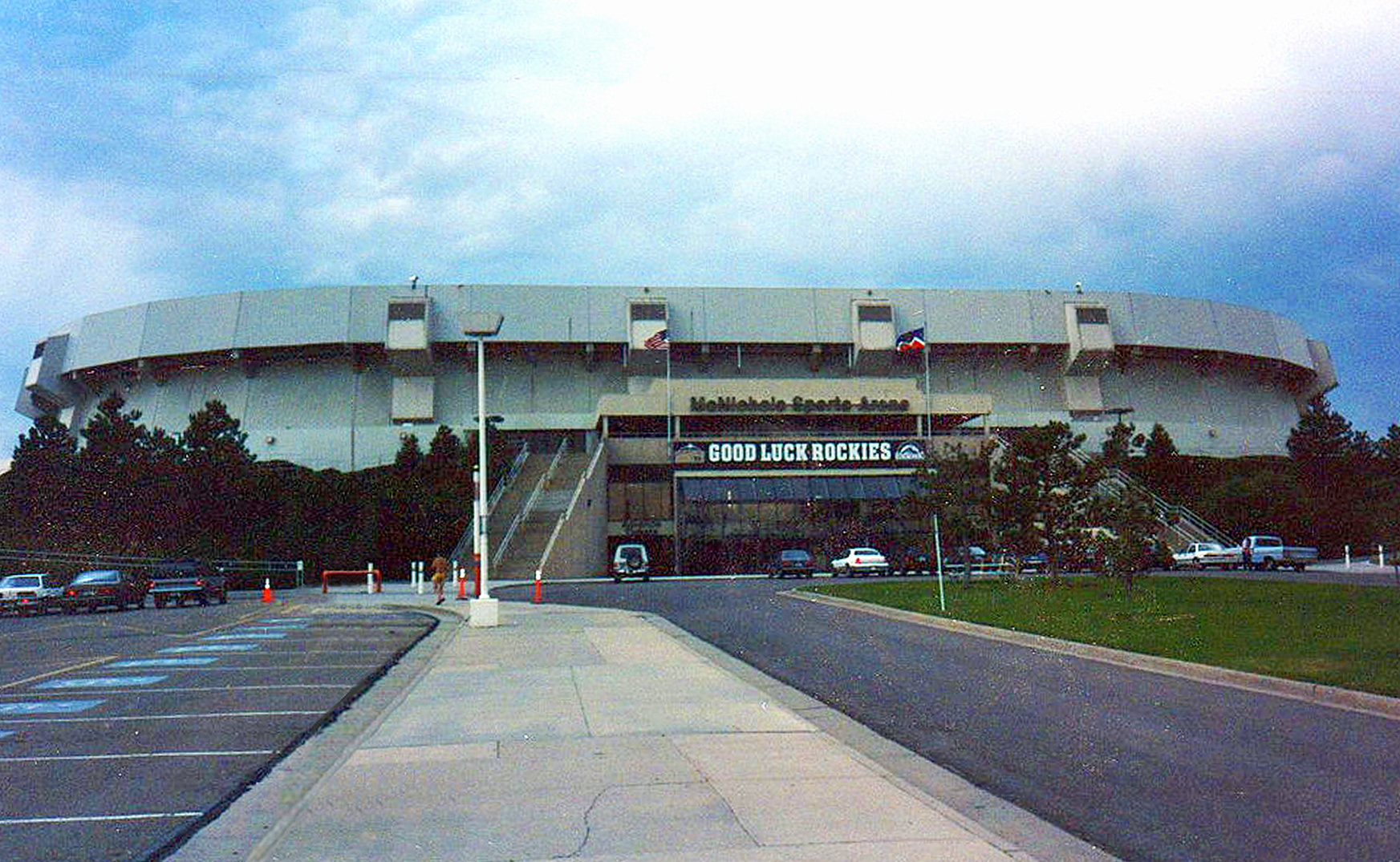
- Exterior of venue (c. 1994)

- Location in Colorado Location in the United States Location in North America
- Interactive map of McNichols Sports Arena
- Address: 1635 Bryant Street
- Location: Denver, Colorado, U.S.
- Coordinates: 39°44′34″N 105°1′21″W
- Owner: City of Denver
- Operator: Feyline
- Capacity: 16,000 Detailed sports capacity: Basketball: 16,700 (1975–1977); 17,387 (1977–1981); 17,251 (1981–1986); 17,022 (1986–1993); 17,171 (1993–1999); Ice hockey: 15,900 (1975–1977); 16,399 (1977–1981); 16,384 (1981–1986); 16,061 (1986–1999)

Construction
- Groundbreaking: August 8, 1973; 53 years ago
- Opened: August 22, 1975; 51 years ago
- Renovated: 1986
- Closed: September 29, 1999; 27 years ago
- Demolished: 2000; 26 years ago
- Cost: $16 million ($116 million in 2025 dollars)
- Architects: Charles S. Sink & Associates
- Structural engineers: Ketchum, Konkel, Ryan, & Fleming

Tenants
- Denver Spurs (WHA) (1975–1976); Colorado Rockies (NHL) (1976–1982); Colorado Flames (CHL) (1982–1984); Denver Nuggets (ABA and NBA) (1975–1999); Colorado Avalanche (NHL) (1995–1999); Denver Grizzlies (IHL) (1994–1995); Denver Dynamite (AFL) (1987, 1989–1991); Denver Avalanche (MISL) (1980–1982); Colorado Xplosion (ABL) (1996–1998); Denver Daredevils (RHI) (1996–1997); Denver Pioneers men's basketball (NCAA) (1997–1999); Denver Pioneers women's basketball (NCAA) (1997–1999)

McNichols Sports Arena was a multi-purpose indoor arena located in Denver, Colorado, United States. Located adjacent to Mile High Stadium and completed in 1975, at a cost of $16 million, it seated 16,061 for hockey games and 17,171 for basketball games.

== Sports use ==
It was named after Denver mayor William H. McNichols Jr., who served from 1968 to 1983. A small-scale scandal surrounded the naming because McNichols was in office at the time.

Twenty-seven luxury suites were installed as part of a 1986 renovation. The renovation also saw the original Stewart-Warner end-zone scoreboards, which each had color matrix screens, upgraded by White Way Sign with new digits and to include new color video screens.

McNichols Sports Arena was the home of the Denver Nuggets of the ABA and NBA for its entire existence from 1975 to 1999. It also hosted multiple hockey teams, including the Denver Spurs of the WHA during the 1975–76 season, the Colorado Rockies of the NHL from 1976 to 1982, the Colorado Flames of the CHL from 1982 to 1984, the Denver Grizzlies of the International Hockey League from 1994 to 1995, and the Colorado Avalanche of the NHL from 1995 to 1999.

The NBA's Denver Nuggets played their last game on May 5, 1999, against the Houston Rockets, and the Colorado Avalanche played their final game on June 1, 1999, during the playoffs versus the Dallas Stars. Though the arena was only 24 years old when it was demolished, like most arenas of the 1970s, it was narrow and dark in the concourse-level corridors. In addition, the locker rooms and shower facilities were not updated to NBA and NHL standards. Also, the arena lacked enough luxury suites (27 compared to some newer arenas' 200 or more) and had no club seating. Combined, these factors effectively made McNichols Sports Arena obsolete.

The arena closed after the Nuggets and Avalanche moved to the Pepsi Center (now Ball Arena) and was demolished in 2000 to make space for a parking lot surrounding Empower Field at Mile High.

=== Notable events ===
McNichols hosted the NCAA Final Four in 1990, won by UNLV over Duke University, the West Regional semifinals and final in 1996, and first and second round NCAA tournament games in 1999. It was also host to the 1976 ABA All-Star Game (the final one held before the ABA–NBA merger), in which the host Nuggets defeated the ABA All-Stars, games 1, 2, and 5 of the 1976 ABA finals, and the 1984 NBA All-Star Game. It also hosted games 1 and 2 of the Stanley Cup Finals in 1996, where the Colorado Avalanche defeated the Florida Panthers in a four-game sweep to bring Denver its first major sports championship.

UFC 1, the first event of the Ultimate Fighting Championship, was held there in 1993.

Another notable event at McNichols took place on December 13, 1983, when the Nuggets hosted the Detroit Pistons in a regular season contest. Nuggets players Kiki Vandeweghe and Alex English scored 51 and 47 points, respectively, while Piston Isiah Thomas also scored 47 points, with teammate John Long scoring 41 in a 186–184 triple-overtime Detroit win over the Nuggets. The game, still to date, is the highest-scoring game in NBA history, and also holds the record for the most players to score 40 or more points in a single game. However, the game was not televised in the Denver area (instead being shown back to the Detroit market, via WKBD-TV) and was attended by just over 9,300 people. This game has since been broadcast on NBA TV and ESPN Classic.

== Concerts ==
The opening event at McNichols Sports Arena was a concert by Lawrence Welk on August 22, 1975.

The group Heart performed their rendition of "Unchained Melody" at the arena in 1980. "Unchained Melody" was included on their highly successful double LP Greatest Hits/Live released November 1980.

The Grateful Dead played at McNichols 13 times between 1977 and 1994. The Grateful Dead were therefor the first time on their Fall Southwest Tour on October 9, 1977. In 1979, the band was scheduled for three nights at Red Rocks, but performances on August 13 and August 14, 1979, were moved to McNichols because of rain. The Grateful Dead would return to play the arena on July 13 and July 14, 1981, December 12–14, 1990. Performances on December 2 and December 3, 1992, would be the first shows of 1992 following the band's break in 1992. The band played its final three Colorado shows on November 29, November 30 and December 1, 1994.

Elvis Presley performed a sold-out concert here on April 23, 1976.

Elton John performed here for two consecutive nights, October 5–6, 1975 as part of the "West of the Rockies" tour.

Paul McCartney and Wings performed here for one night June 7, 1976.

The Bee Gees played here on July 2, 1979, as part of their highly successful Spirits Having Flown Tour.

The band Kiss performed at McNichols on November 4, 1979, as part of their Dynasty Tour. This was the last tour featuring original drummer Peter Criss until 1996.

Rolling Stones guitarists Keith Richards and Ron Wood performed as The New Barbarians at the arena in 1979.

REO Speedwagon's concert from 1981 was performed here, as MTV's first ever live concert.

Electric Light Orchestra performed here September 27, 1981 during the Time Tour.

AC/DC performed here 9 times between 1982 and 1996.

The arena played host to Amnesty International's A Conspiracy of Hope Benefit Concert on June 8, 1986. The show was headlined by U2 and Sting and also featured Bryan Adams, Peter Gabriel, Lou Reed, Joan Baez and The Neville Brothers.

Parts of U2's half-live rockumentary Rattle and Hum, came from two concerts filmed in the arena on the third leg of the band's Joshua Tree Tour in November 1987. The recordings notably included Bono's famous "Fuck the revolution!" speech during "Sunday Bloody Sunday", featured in the accompanying film.

Jethro Tull played the arena from 1976 to 1980.

Def Leppard recorded one of their shows here in February 1988 and released it as Live: In the Round, in Your Face.

Pop star Michael Jackson performed 3 consecutive sold-out shows in front of 40,251 people during his Bad World Tour on March 24, 25 and 26, 1988.

Pop star Prince made a stop here on July 3, 1986, while on his Parade Tour.

The bonus tracks on Stevie Ray Vaughan & Double Trouble's album In Step, including "The House is Rockin’" (Live), "Let Me Love You Baby" (Live), "Texas Flood" (Live), and "Life Without You" (Live) were recorded on November 29, 1989, at McNichols Sports Arena.

Depeche Mode held a concert for its Devotional Tour at the arena on November 2, 1993. Following the performance, keyboardist Martin Gore was arrested by local police and fined $50 for disturbing the peace when holding a loud party in his hotel room.

The first Ultimate Fighting Championship (UFC) event UFC 1 was held on November 12, 1993.

Phish performed and recorded their show on November 17, 1997, which was later released as a live album entitled Live Phish Volume 11.

ZZ Top performed at the venue's final concert on September 12, 1999. They were also the first rock band to play the arena on August 27, 1975.

Steve Miller Band and Bachman-Turner Overdrive played McNichols in 1978.

Rush played McNichols a few times, one occasion being March 1, 1980.

On Halloween, 1976, Black Sabbath, Heart and Boston played to a huge standing room only crowd in McNichols.

ZZ Top played on August 1, 1976, under the Colorado Sun-Day #2 event. When BOC dropped out, the concert was moved from Mile High Stadium to McNichols Arena. Then the Outlaws were added to the billing. The night of the concert, the Outlaws did not show, due to some illness, so ZZ Top started early and played for at least three hours.

Events and tenants
Preceded by Denver Arena Auditorium	Home of the Denver Nuggets; 1975–1999	Succeeded by Pepsi Center
Preceded by Quebec Coliseum (as Quebec Nordiques)	Home of the Colorado Avalanche; 1995–1999	Succeeded by Pepsi Center
Preceded by The Forum	Host of the NBA All-Star Game; 1984	Succeeded by Hoosier Dome
Preceded by Kingdome	NCAA Division I men's basketball tournament finals venue 1990	Succeeded by Hoosier Dome
Preceded by Kemper Arena (as Kansas City Scouts)	Home of the Colorado Rockies; 1976–1982	Succeeded by Meadowlands Arena (as New Jersey Devils)
Preceded by First arena	Home of the Denver Grizzlies; 1994–1995	Succeeded by E Center
Preceded by First arena	Home of the Denver Spurs; 1975–1976	Succeeded by Last arena
Preceded by First arena	Home of the Colorado Flames; 1982–1984	Succeeded by Last arena
Preceded by First event	Ultimate Fighting Championship venue UFC 1	Succeeded by Mammoth Gardens
