= Huntington Place =

Convention center in Detroit

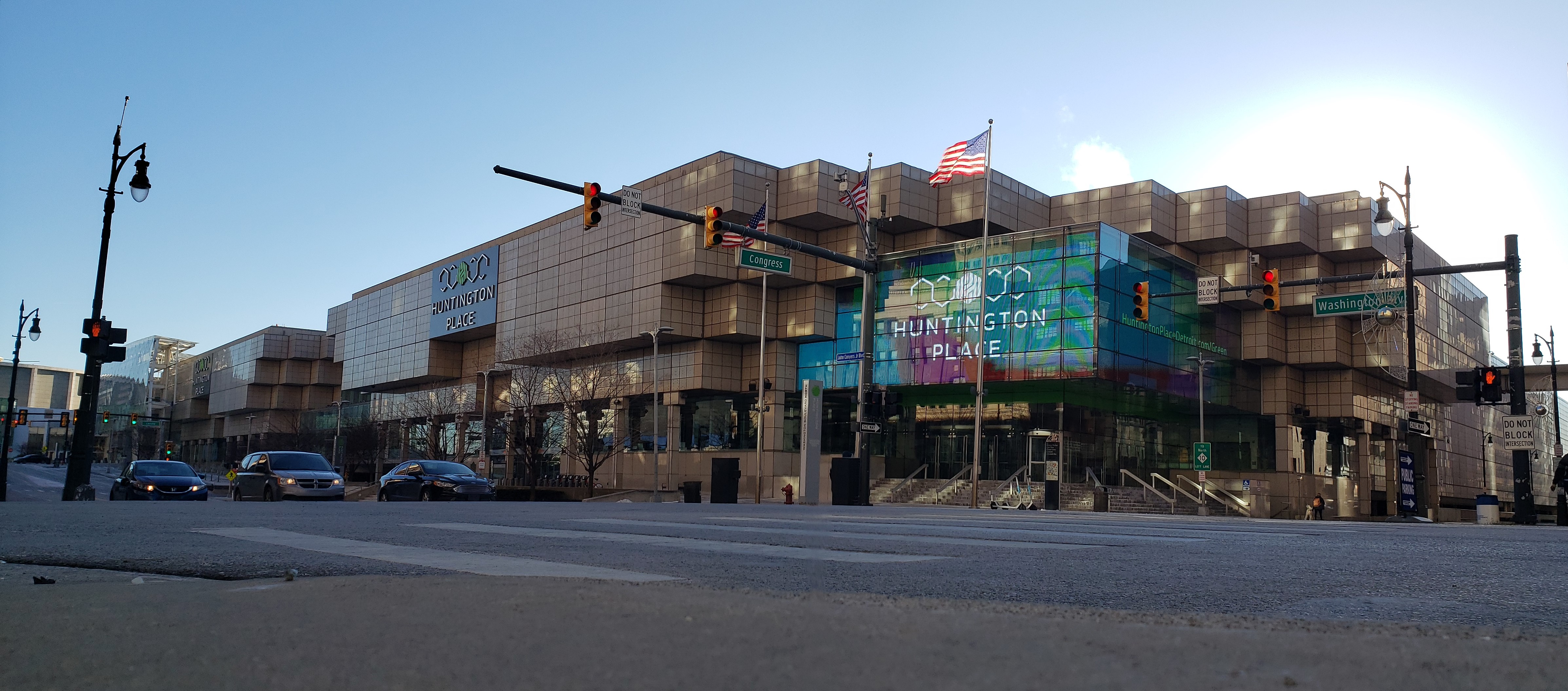
- Huntington Place in 2022
- Interactive map of Huntington Place
- Former names: Cobo Hall (1960–2010); Cobo Center (2010–2019); TCF Center (2019–2021)
- Address: 1 Washington Boulevard
- Location: Detroit, Michigan
- Coordinates: 42°19′34″N 83°2′49″W
- Owner: Detroit Regional Convention Facility Authority
- Operator: Legends Global
- Type: Convention center
- Public transit: Huntington Place

Construction
- Opened: 1960; 66 years ago
- Renovated: 1989, 2015
- Expanded: 2015, 2025
- Architect: Giffels & Rossetti

Website
- Official website

Huntington Place (formerly known as Cobo Hall, Cobo Center, and briefly TCF Center) is a convention center in Downtown Detroit, owned by the Detroit Regional Convention Facility Authority (DRCFA) and operated by Legends Global. Located at 1 Washington Boulevard, the facility was originally named after former Mayor of Detroit Albert Cobo.

The largest annual event held at Huntington Place is the North American International Auto Show (NAIAS), which has been held at the center since 1965.

== Facilities ==
Huntington Place is 2,400,000-square-foot (220,000 m^{2}) in size and has 723,000 square feet (67,200 m^{2}) of exhibition space, with 623,000 square feet (57,900 m^{2}) contiguous. It previously featured an arena, Cobo Arena, which hosted various concerts, sporting events, and other events. In 2015, the facility completed a renovation that repurposed the Cobo Arena space, adding additional meeting halls, a glass atrium with a view of the Detroit riverfront, and the 40,000-square-foot (3,700 m^{2}) Grand Riverview Ballroom.

It is served by the Detroit People Mover with its own station. Huntington Place has several large, attached parking garages, as well as parking on the roof of the facility, and direct access to the Lodge Freeway. The facility is located along the Detroit International Riverfront, and within walking distance of several downtown hotels.

== History ==
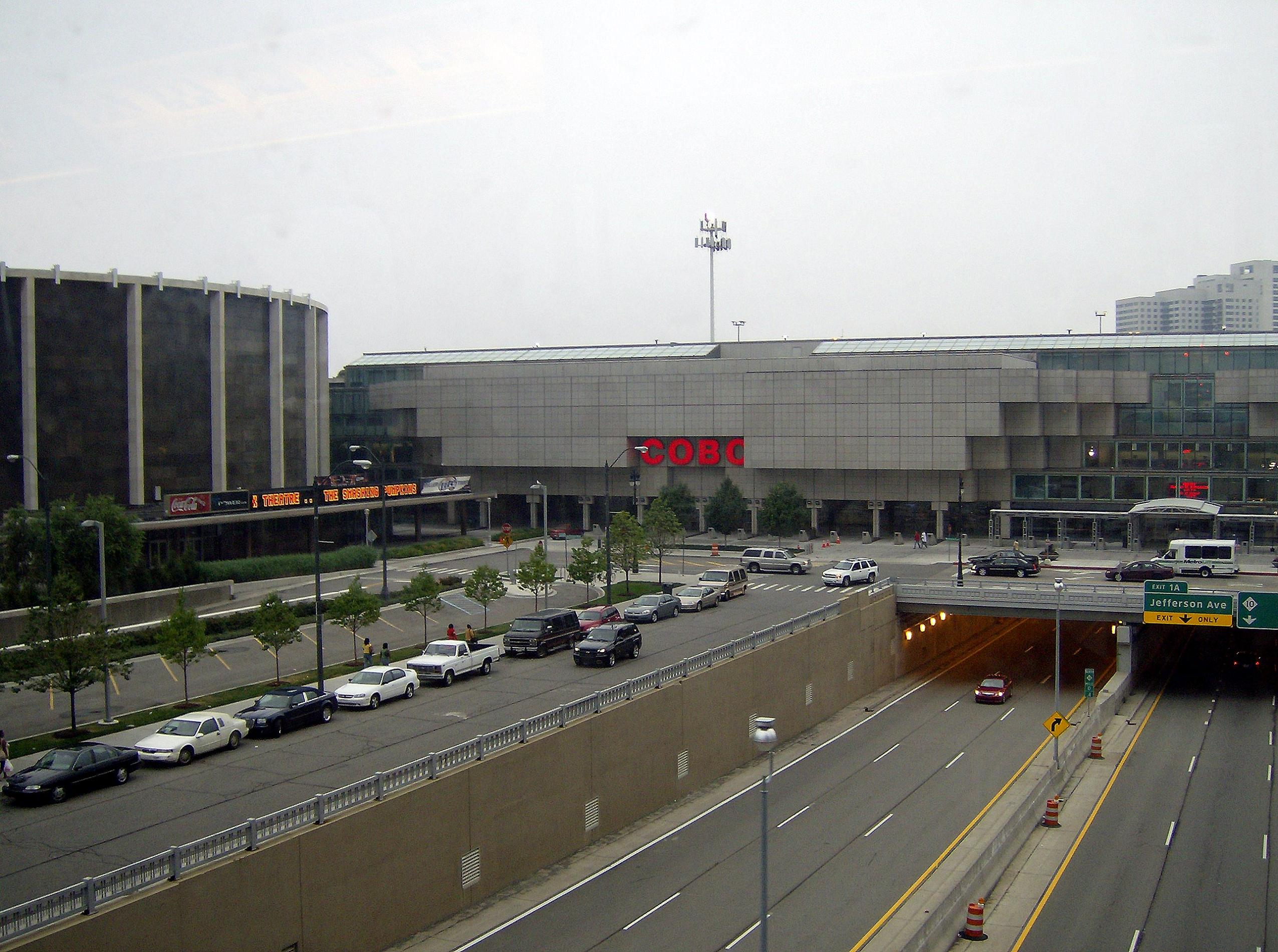
Huntington Place, then Cobo Hall, in 2007, with the southern end of M-10 passing under the center 300 yards (270 m) from ending at street level (and becoming/leaving Jefferson Avenue)

The facility and its attached arena initially cost $56 million. It was designed by the Detroit architectural firm Giffels & Rossetti and took four years to complete. Louis Rossetti was the chief architect. The facility is on the site where Antoine de la Mothe Cadillac, a French colonist, first set foot and landed on the banks of the river in July 1701 and claimed the area for France in the name of King Louis XIV. The first convention at the facility was held in 1960 by the Florists' Telegraph Delivery (FTD). The first event was the 43rd Auto Industry Dinner on October 17, 1960, at which President Dwight D. Eisenhower was the keynote speaker. In 1989, a renovation was completed to expand its size to 2,400,000 square feet (220,000 m^{2}).

Joe Louis Arena, named after boxer and former heavyweight champion Joe Louis, was built adjacent to the facility. It served as the home of the Detroit Red Wings of the National Hockey League from 1979 until its closure in 2017 when the team moved to Little Caesars Arena. Demolition of the arena began in 2019.

In 2009, the then mayor, Kenneth Cockrel Jr., vetoed the Detroit City Council's resolution against the expansion of the facility. Shortly after, the facility came under ownership and operation, through a 30-year capital lease, of the Detroit Regional Convention Facility Authority (DRCFA). The five-member Authority Board consists of one representative from each of five government agencies – the City of Detroit, State of Michigan and the three Metro Detroit counties of Wayne, Oakland and Macomb. Consensus agreement from the authority is needed for all decisions, and it has become a model for regional cooperation in Southeast Michigan.

In October 2010, the DRCFA awarded a management contract to SMG, which merged with AEG Facilities to form ASM Global in 2019. It extended the contract for three years in September 2013 and again in June 2017. In 2015, a five-year, $279 million renovation was completed, including a new atrium, ballroom, and meeting spaces, constructed mainly within the former Cobo Arena building.

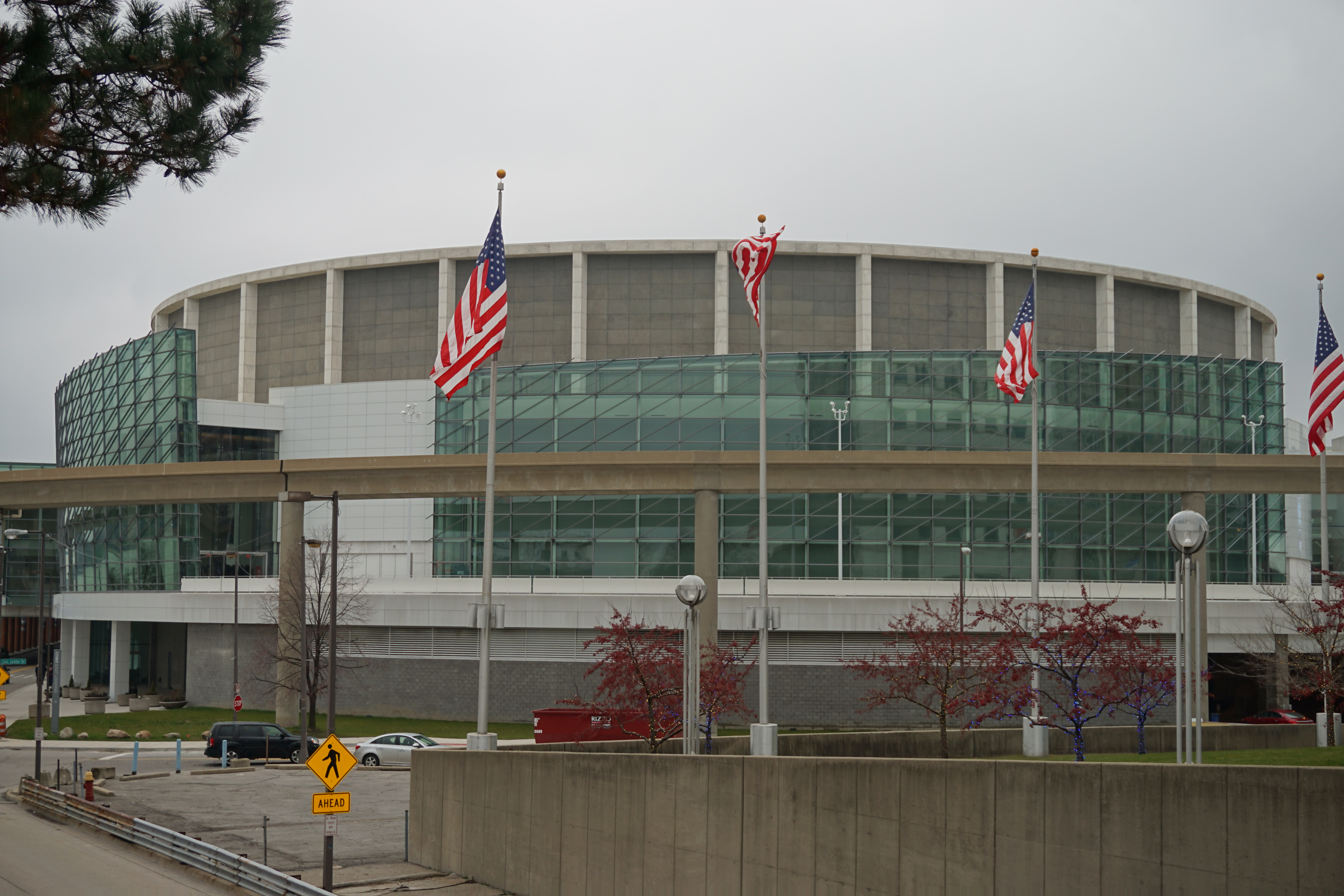
Huntington Place, then Cobo Center, in 2015

In 2017, in the wake of the 50th anniversary of the 1967 Detroit riot, the then mayor, Mike Duggan, proposed that Cobo Center be renamed due to modern reappraisals of Cobo's tenure as mayor. Cobo had upheld exclusionary covenants against African Americans, and was accused of responding poorly to allegations of harassment and police brutality against African American residents. In 2018, the DRCFA stated that it had already been considering the sale of naming rights to the facility, for the first time in its history.

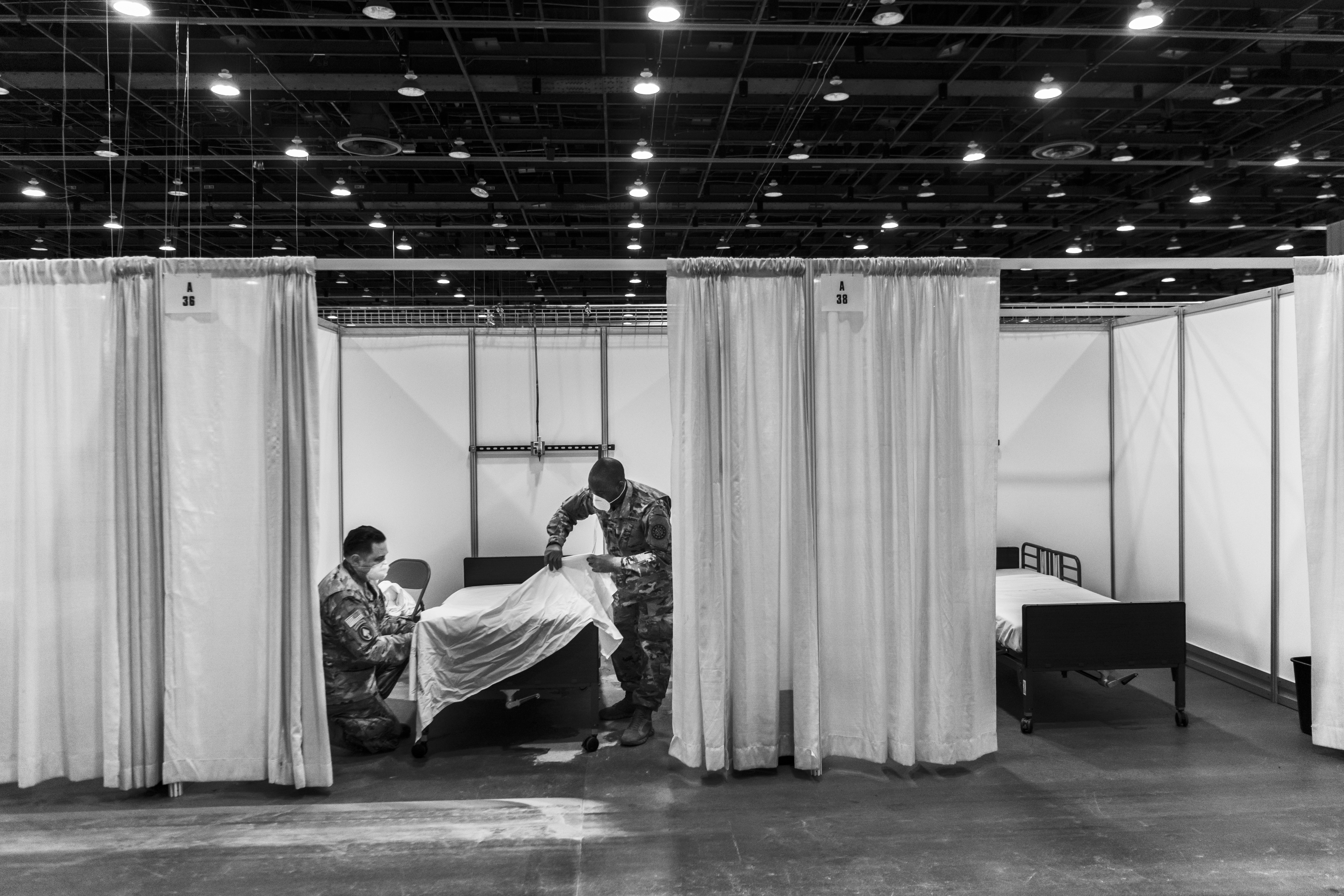
Huntington Place was converted into a temporary hospital during the COVID-19 pandemic in Michigan.

In June 2018, the DRCFA approved a 22-year naming rights agreement with Chemical Bank, which took effect on July 1, 2018; the following month, Chemical announced that it would relocate its headquarters to downtown Detroit. The parties agreed to delay the official announcement until February 20, 2019, after Chemical and TCF Financial Corporation announced their intent to merge. Chemical stated that it would wait until after the completion of the merger to announce Cobo Center's new name, but that it was expected to carry the TCF branding. In the meantime, Chemical Bank logos appeared on advertising and signage at the facility, and a ceremonial bust of Albert Cobo was removed from public display. The merger between Chemical and TCF was completed on August 1, 2019, with the combined company taking on the TCF name. Cobo Center was officially renamed TCF Center on August 27, 2019.

On December 13, 2020, Huntington Bancshares announced its intent to acquire TCF. The merger was completed in June 2021, and on December 9, 2021, TCF Center was renamed Huntington Place.

In July 2025, the DRCFA approved a new $125 million expansion, which will add a 20,000 square-foot expansion to the southwest end of the building along Steve Yzerman Drive. The expansion will include a rooftop terrace, and a skyway that will connect the complex to the new JW Marriott Hotel being constructed on the site of the former Joe Louis Arena. The DRCFA aimed for the expansion to be completed by the end of 2026, in time for the opening of the hotel.

== Notable events ==
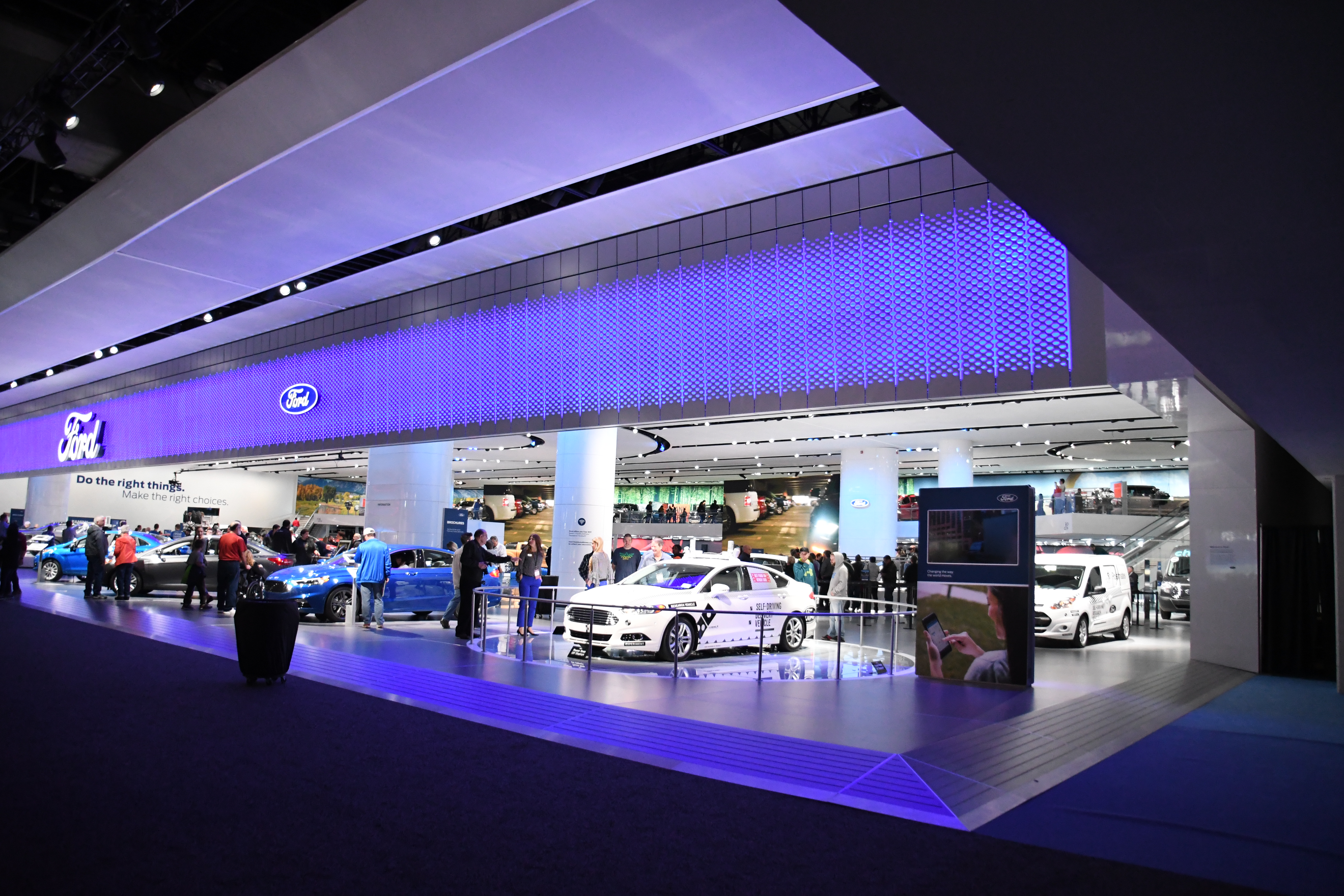
Ford Motor Company exhibit at the 2018 North American International Auto Show

In 1961, the show car event Detroit Autorama moved to the facility, and has been held there annually since.

Since 1965, the largest event held at Huntington Place is the North American International Auto Show (NAIAS). This event draws thousands of international press and suppliers during its initial five days and has a charity preview party for 11,000 guests before the public opening. Since 1976, the Charity Preview has raised more than $125 million for southeastern Michigan children's charities. After the Charity Preview party, the NAIAS is open to the public for ten days, drawing, on average, 735,000 attendees.

Floyd Mayweather Jr. defeated Emanuel Augustus, then known as Emanuel Burton, via a ninth-round TKO on October 21, 2000. The fight took place at Cobo Hall rather than Cobo Arena.

The anime convention Youmacon has been held annually at Huntington Place since 2012.

== Cobo Arena ==
Cobo Arena
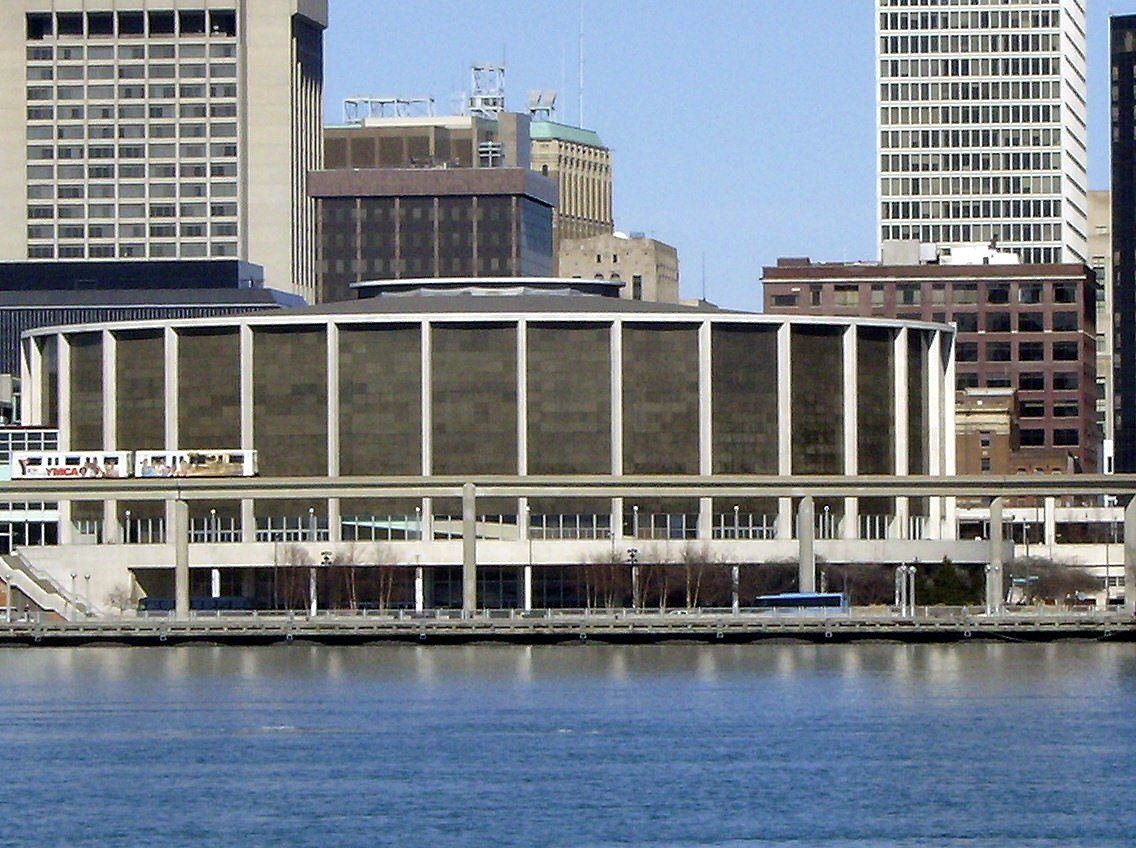
- Interactive map of Cobo Arena
- Capacity: 12,000

Construction
- Opened: 1960
- Closed: 2010

Tenants
- Detroit Pistons (NBA) (1961–1978); NCAA Division I Men's Indoor Track and Field Championships (NCAA) (1965–1981); Detroit Loves (WTT) (1974); Michigan Stags (WHA) (1974–1975); Detroit Lightning (MISL) (1979–1980); Detroit Mercy Titans (NCAA) (1989–1994; 1997–1999); Detroit Ambassadors (OHL) (1990–1992); Detroit Rockers (NPSL) (1990–2001); Motor City Mustangs (RHI) (1995); Detroit Dogs (ABA) (2000–2001)

Cobo Arena was an arena that served as the home court of the Detroit Pistons of the National Basketball Association from 1961 to 1978 and the host of the NCAA Division I Men's Indoor Track and Field Championships from 1965 to 1981. The short-lived Michigan Stags of the World Hockey Association and the Detroit Loves of World TeamTennis called Cobo Arena home in 1974, as did the Detroit Rockers of the National Professional Soccer League, the Detroit Mercy Titans basketball team of the NCAA, and the Motor City Mustangs of Roller Hockey International.

Cobo also hosted rock concerts, by such artists as Anthrax, Black Sabbath, David Bowie, Alice Cooper, The Cure, The Doors, Duran Duran, Exodus, Judy Garland, the Grateful Dead, Green Day, Helloween, Jimi Hendrix, Iron Maiden (twice in 1982), The J. Geils Band, Jefferson Starship, Journey, Kiss, Led Zeppelin, Madonna, Ted Nugent, Parliament-Funkadelic, Phish, Prince, Queen, The Rolling Stones, the Sex Pistols, Bruce Springsteen, The Tragically Hip, Van Halen, and The Who.

Notable live albums that have been recorded at the arena include:

- Bob Seger recorded all of Live Bullet and part of Nine Tonight at Cobo Arena.
- Yes recorded a few songs at Cobo Arena for their Yesshows album, released in 1980.
- Kiss recorded most of live album Alive! and video Animalize Live Uncensored at the arena and it is featured in their video for "Modern Day Delilah".
- On August 4 and 5, 1980, Journey recorded most of their live album Captured at Cobo Arena.
- The Tragically Hip recorded their Live Between Us live album at the arena in November 1996 during the band's Trouble at the Henhouse tour.

As the venue for Big Time Wrestling on every other Saturday night in the 1960s and 1970s, it was considered to be "The House the Sheik built." It also hosted Skate America in 1995.

WWF/WWE and WCW hosted numerous house shows at the arena during the 1980s and 1990s. Additionally, WWE returned to the arena for a Saturday Night's Main Event special on March 18, 2006.

On June 23, 1963, following the Detroit Walk to Freedom civil rights march, Martin Luther King Jr. delivered the original version of his "I Have a Dream" speech at Cobo Arena to a full house.

In January 1994, during the U.S. Figure Skating Championships at Joe Louis Arena, skater Nancy Kerrigan was bludgeoned in her right lower thigh by an assailant in a corridor of Cobo Arena, which was being used as a practice facility. The assault, which was dubbed "the whack heard 'round the world", was planned by rival Tonya Harding's ex-husband Jeff Gillooly and co-conspirator Shawn Eckardt, in a plot to prevent Kerrigan from competing at the championships and the 1994 Winter Olympics.

Cobo Arena closed in 2010 as part of a major renovation completed in 2015. The space was used to construct new facilities, including the 40,000-square-foot (3,700 m^{2}) Grand Riverview Ballroom, a new atrium area, 21 additional meeting rooms, and an outdoor terrace.

== See also ==
- Vibe Credit Union Showplace - Metro Detroit's second largest convention center
