= Minnesota Blue Ox =

- League: Roller Hockey International
- Conference: Eastern
- Founded: 1995
- Operated: 1995, 1999
- Home arena: Aldrich Arena (1995); Mariucci Arena (1999)
- Colors: Red, Black, White (1995) Blue, Yellow, Grey, Black, White (1999)
- Murphy Cups: None
- Conference Championships: None
- Division Championships: None

Franchise history
- Minnesota Blue Ox (1995, 1999)

The Minnesota Blue Ox were a professional roller hockey team based in Minneapolis, Minnesota, United States, that played in Roller Hockey International.

== History ==
Formed in the wake of the former Minnesota Arctic Blast, who played at Target Center in 1994, the Blue Ox joined RHI and were placed in the five-team Central Division (Buffalo Stampede, Chicago Cheetahs, Detroit Motor City Mustangs, St. Louis Vipers).

After a 13–11–0 in the 1995 regular season (second in the Central), Minnesota was the fourth-seed in the Eastern Conference playoffs. The Blue Ox were quickly eliminated in two games (best-of 3 series) by the fifth-seeded New Jersey Rockin' Rollers.

The Blue Ox finished the 1999 season with a record of 11–15–0, ranked third in the Eastern Division. The team's average home attendance of 304 was the lowest in the league. The Buffalo Wings knocked off the Blue Ox in the first round of the playoffs.

== Season-by-season ==
Season	W	L	OTL	Pts	Result	Playoffs
1995	13	11	0	26	2nd, Central Division	Eliminated in 1st Round by New Jersey Rockin' Rollers, swept in two games
1999	11	15	0	22	3rd, Eastern Conference	Eliminated in 1st Round by Buffalo Wings
TOTALS	24	26	0			

== See also ==
- Minnesota Arctic Blast
