= Darren Banks =

Canadian ice hockey player (born 1966)

- Born: March 18, 1966 (age 60) Toronto, Ontario, Canada
- Height: 6 ft 2 in (188 cm)
- Weight: 216 lb (98 kg; 15 st 6 lb)
- Position: Left wing
- Shot: Left
- Played for: Boston Bruins
- NHL draft: Undrafted
- Playing career: 1989–2005

Darren Alexander Banks (born March 18, 1966) is a Canadian former professional ice hockey player. He played in 20 NHL games with the Boston Bruins between 1992 and 1994, as well as extensively in the minor leagues and briefly in Europe during a career that lasted from 1989 to 2005. During his career he played predominantly as an enforcer.

== Career summary ==
Banks began his collegiate career in 1986 with the Brock Badgers having previously played for the Leamington Flyers. Banks played for the Badgers for three seasons, with his most productive season coming in his final year, registering 33 points in 26 games, along with 88 PIM. During his time at Brock University, he majored in sociology.

Upon leaving university, Banks turned professional and signed with the Knoxville Cherokees of the ECHL for the 1989–90 season. In his first season as a pro, Banks had his most productive season, registering 47 points in 52 games, whilst also accumulating 258 minutes in the penalty box. His success in Tennessee caught the attention of the NHL's Calgary Flames, who signed him to a contract at the end of the ECHL season. The Flames immediately sent him to their IHL affiliate team, the Salt Lake Golden Eagles, for whom he played six games. During the season, Banks also played two games for the Fort Wayne Komets, also of the IHL.

He returned to the Eagles for the 1990–91 season, playing exclusively for the team. He registered 16 points in 56 games, along with 286 PIM. The following season he again played with Salt Lake City, playing 55 games, tallying ten points and 303 PIM. The off-season saw Banks sign as a free agent for the Boston Bruins in time for the 1992–93 season. Though he played primarily with Boston's farm team in Providence, Banks made his NHL debut on October 8, 1992 against the Hartford Whalers. He made an impression on his debut; receiving a game misconduct penalty as a result of a fight with Scott Daniels in the 2nd period. Over the course of the season, Banks went on to play an additional 15 games with Boston, and dressed 46 times for Providence. Banks remained in the Bruins system the following season, playing for Boston four times, and Providence 41 times. During the season Banks suffered a separated shoulder, and upon returning from injury he played two games for Providence before separating his other shoulder; a situation which caused friction with Providence coach Mike O'Connell and culminated with Banks shooting a puck at O'Connell during practice. In the off-season O'Connell was promoted to Assistant General Manager of the Boston Bruins, resulting in Banks being released from the team.

Banks scored exactly two NHL goals. Both came in the same game, an 8–2 Boston road victory over the San Jose sharks on October 15, 1992.

The 1994–95 season was a nomadic one for Banks, playing 32 games in the AHL for both the Adirondack Red Wings and Portland Pirates, as well as 2 games for IHL side Las Vegas Thunder under coach Chris McSorley, before finishing the season with the Detroit Falcons of the CoHL after joining the team in February 1995. Both Adirondack and the Falcons were farm teams of the Detroit Red Wings. The following season, Banks predominantly played for the Falcons, playing 38 games registering 28 points and 290 PIM. In addition, he played six games for the Utica Blizzard, also of the CoHL, before returning to the Las Vegas Thunder towards the end of the season. The 1996–97 season saw Banks play exclusively for the IHL's Detroit Vipers, where he scored 23 points in 64 games and also accrued a career-high 306 PIM. The Vipers had a strong season, finishing on top during the regular season, before being crowned Turner Cup champions by beating the Long Beach Ice Dogs in the playoff final.

Banks began the 1997–98 season with the Québec Rafales also of the IHL, after being traded along with Jeff Parrott by the Vipers in exchange for Stan Drulia. He played four games in Quebec, before moving to the San Antonio Dragons. His stay in Texas was also short, playing seven games, before returning to the Detroit Vipers with whom he finished the season. The Vipers had another extended playoff run, reaching the final which they ultimately lost to the Chicago Wolves. He returned to the Vipers for the 1998-99 season playing 58 games and scoring 18 points whilst registering 296 PIM.

He travelled overseas for the first time in his career to play for the London Knights of the BISL for the 1999–00 season, reuniting with McSorley. He played 23 games in the capital before courting controversy. In January 2000, following the completion of a game against the Ayr Scottish Eagles, Banks fought Eagles player Cam Bristow and assaulted a match official. As a result of his actions, Banks was suspended for 12 games and faced a £500 fine. However, prior to the resultant suspension and fine being announced, Banks had left the UK and signed for the Port Huron Border Cats of the UHL. In Michigan he played 17 games, registering eight points and 12 PIM. The following year, Banks signed with the Knoxville Speed, also of the UHL. After 20 games with the Speed, he was traded back to Port Huron, for whom he played four games. In addition with his time in the UHL, Banks also played eight games with WCHL side, Phoenix Mustangs.

Between 2001 and 2003 Banks did not play hockey, however, during the 2003-04 season he signed with the Jacksonville Barracudas of the WHA2, playing seven games, scoring three points and registering 25 PIM. The following year, he played two games, with the Kansas City Outlaws of the UHL. Subsequently, Banks retired from professional hockey.

=== Roller hockey ===
In addition to his ice hockey career, Banks also played professional roller hockey, which took place in the ice hockey off-season. In the summer of 1995, Banks played for the Anaheim Bullfrogs of the Roller Hockey International league, and, despite initially being unable to stop in roller blades, scored 21 points in 17 games, along with 86 PIM. Banks returned to the Bullfrogs the following season, playing nine games with the team, before being traded to the Long Island Jawz in exchange for a sixth-round draft pick and future considerations in July 1996.

== Awards and achievements ==
- IHL Turner Cup Champion (1997)

== Career statistics ==
=== Regular season and playoffs ===
			Regular season					Playoffs
Season	Team	League	GP	G	A	Pts	PIM	GP	G	A	Pts	PIM
1986–87	Brock University	CIAU	24	5	3	8	82	—	—	—	—	—
1987–88	Brock University	CIAU	26	10	11	21	110	—	—	—	—	—
1988–89	Brock University	CIAU	26	19	14	33	88	—	—	—	—	—
1989–90	Knoxville Cherokees	ECHL	52	25	22	47	258	—	—	—	—	—
1989–90	Salt Lake Golden Eagles	IHL	6	0	0	0	11	—	—	—	—	—
1989–90	Fort Wayne Komets	IHL	2	0	1	1	0	1	0	0	0	10
1990–91	Salt Lake Golden Eagles	IHL	56	9	7	16	286	3	0	1	1	6
1991–92	Salt Lake Golden Eagles	IHL	55	5	5	10	303	—	—	—	—	—
1992–93	Boston Bruins	NHL	16	2	1	3	64	—	—	—	—	—
1992–93	Providence Bruins	AHL	43	9	5	14	199	1	0	0	0	0
1993–94	Boston Bruins	NHL	4	0	1	1	9	—	—	—	—	—
1993–94	Providence Bruins	AHL	41	6	3	9	189	—	—	—	—	—
1994–95	Adirondack Red Wings	AHL	20	3	2	5	65	—	—	—	—	—
1994–95	Portland Pirates	AHL	12	1	2	3	38	—	—	—	—	—
1994–95	Las Vegas Thunder	IHL	2	0	0	0	19	—	—	—	—	—
1994–95	Detroit Falcons	CoHL	22	9	10	19	51	12	3	5	8	59
1995–96	Detroit Falcons	CoHL	38	11	17	28	290	—	—	—	—	—
1995–96	Utica Blizzard	CoHL	6	1	2	3	22	—	—	—	—	—
1995–96	Las Vegas Thunder	IHL	5	0	2	2	10	10	0	0	0	54
1996–97	Detroit Vipers	IHL	64	10	13	23	306	20	4	5	9	40
1997–98	Québec Rafales	IHL	4	0	1	1	9	—	—	—	—	—
1997–98	San Antonio Dragons	IHL	7	0	0	0	6	—	—	—	—	—
1997–98	Detroit Vipers	IHL	59	16	14	30	175	21	2	3	5	97
1998–99	Detroit Vipers	IHL	58	6	12	18	296	3	0	0	0	35
1999–00	London Knights	BISL	23	8	2	10	101	—	—	—	—	—
1999–00	Port Huron Border Cats	UHL	17	3	5	8	12	—	—	—	—	—
2000–01	Knoxville Speed	UHL	20	4	7	11	50	—	—	—	—	—
2000–01	Port Huron Border Cats	UHL	4	0	0	0	4	—	—	—	—	—
2000–01	Phoenix Mustangs	WCHL	8	0	1	1	36	—	—	—	—	—
2003–04	Jacksonville Barracudas	WHA2	7	1	2	3	25	—	—	—	—	—
2004–05	Kansas City Outlaws	UHL	2	0	0	0	2	—	—	—	—	—
IHL totals			318	46	55	101	1421	58	6	9	15	242
NHL totals			20	2	2	4	73	—	—	—	—	—

=== Roller Hockey ===
			Regular season					Playoffs
Season	Team	League	GP	G	A	Pts	PIM	GP	G	A	Pts	PIM
1995	Anaheim Bullfrogs	RHI	17	13	8	21	86	—	—	—	—	—
1996	Anaheim Bullfrogs	RHI	9	1	4	5	46	—	—	—	—	—
1996	Long Island Jawz	RHI	4	2	1	3	21	—	—	—	—	—
RHI totals			30	16	13	29	153	—	—	—	—	—

== Post-playing career ==
As of November 2019, Banks works as an Executive casino host at The D Casino in Las Vegas and, upon its opening, will undertake the same role at Circa. He formerly worked for CP Rail.

Due to his time in the Detroit Red Wings system, he is a Red Wings Alumni member, and has previously worked with the Detroit Hockey Association, and the Hockey in the Hood tournament started by Willie O'Ree, in an effort to introduce inner-city minority children to hockey.

In November 2013, Banks was among the 10 players who launched a class action lawsuit against the NHL over head injuries and concussions, led by lawyer and former NFL player Mel Owens. Over 200 former NHL players subsequently joined the suit. As a result of his time playing hockey, Banks suffers from memory problems.
