= Denver Daredevils =

- City: Denver, Colorado
- Founded: 1996
- Home arena: McNichols Sports Arena
- Colors: Blue, Purple, Yellow, Red
- Murphy Cups: None
- Conference Championships: None
- Division Championships: None

Franchise history
- Denver Daredevils (1996)

The Denver Daredevils were a professional roller hockey team based in Denver, Colorado, United States that played in Roller Hockey International. The Daredevils played in the Roller Hockey International in 1996. Coached by Kevin Cheveldayoff in their only season, they played 28 games: eight of which they won, 17 of which they lost, and three of which they lost in overtime.
