= Anaheim Bullfrogs =

- City: Anaheim, California
- Founded: 1993
- Folded: 1999
- Home arena: Anaheim Arena (1993); Arrowhead Pond of Anaheim (1994–1999)
- Colours: Orange, Green (1993) Black, Gold, White (1994–1999)
- Owner: Stuart Silver

The Anaheim Bullfrogs were a professional inline hockey team based in Anaheim, California. The Bullfrogs played in Roller Hockey International (1993–1997) and Major League Roller Hockey (1998) before returning to Roller Hockey international (1999). The Bullfrogs played their home games in the Arrowhead Pond of Anaheim.

The team won two championships in 1993 and 1997, the only team to win more than one. The team also won the Major League Roller Hockey championship in 1998. The team also went to the Murphy Cup finals two other times but lost to the Orlando Jackals in 1996 and the St. Louis Vipers in 1999. The team lasted the full length of the RHI and had the highest attendance figures at the Arrowhead Pond.

The Anaheim Bullfrogs made a brief comeback when they joined IHA, a pro roller hockey league held during the NHL Lockout at the Anaheim's Convention Center. They were one of the six teams participating in the league. However, due to poor management, the league folded halfway through the season, and the Bullfrogs were once again gone. They were undefeated until the collapse of the league.

Some players of note include: Rob Laurie, Victor Gervais, Hugo Bélanger, Rick Judson, Kevin Kerr, Daniel Shank, Rick Judson, Darren Banks, Savo Mitrovic, Darren Langdon, Glen Metropolit, Ralph Barahona, and Jared Bednar.

== Franchise history ==
In Roller Hockey International's inaugural 1993 season, led by head coach Chris McSorley, the Bullfrogs finished with a record of 13-0-1, the best in the league. Building on the growing popularity of inline skating, the team's averaged attendance of nearly 8,800 fans per game, with three of team's seven home games drawing audiences of 10,000 or more at the Anaheim Arena. The team won all four of its playoff games, including a two-game sweep of the Oakland Skates to win the first ever Murphy Cup, marking the champion of Roller Hockey International.

The team beat the New Jersey Rockin' Rollers by a score of 9-5 in the second game of the RHI 1997 Murphy Cup finals held at the Continental Airlines Arena in East Rutherford, New Jersey, to win the series in a two-game sweep.

The Bullfrogs left RHI and played the 1998 season in Major League Roller Hockey (MLRH), finishing with a record of 20-0-1. With MLRH dropping from 14 teams to two in 1999, the Bullfrogs and the Buffalo Wings returned to play in a revitalized RHI, which planned to resume league play after the year off with 10 teams that season.

The Bullfrogs finished the 1999 RHI season with a record of 22-4-2, but lost the league championship to the St. Louis Vipers by a score of 8-6. The Bullfrogs had won the Roller Hockey International Murphy Cup championships in 1993 and 1997, and won the Major League Roller Hockey Jason Cup title in 1998 against the Orlando Surge.

After a debt-ridden Roller Hockey International announced that it would not hold a 2000 season, management of the Bullfrogs announced that the team would be in hiatus that season, declining to join other professional roller hockey leagues based on their low level of competitive play.

== Season-by-season record ==
Season	GP	W	L	SOL	Pts	GF	GA	PIM	Finish	Playoffs
1993 (RHI)	14	13	0	1	27	130	83	405	1st, Buss	Won Quarterfinal (Coasters); Won Semifinal (Blades); Won Murphy Cup Final (Skates)
1994 (RHI)	22	13	8	1	27	185	155	634	3rd, Pacific	Won Pacific Semifinal (Rhinos); Won Pacific Final (Blades); Lost Western Final (Rage)
1995 (RHI)	24	19	4	1	39	219	157	558	1st, Pacific	Won Western Quarterfinal (Blades); Won Western Semifinal (Barracudas); Lost Western Final (Rhinos)
1996 (RHI)	28	22	4	2	46	215	159	495	1st, Pacific	Won Pacific Final (Blades); Won Western Final (Voodoo); Lost Murphy Cup Final (Jackals)
1997 (RHI)	24	15	9	0	30	173	156	435	2nd, Western	Won Western Semifinal (Blades); Won Western Final (Rhinos); Won Murphy Cup Final (Rockin Rollers)
1998 (MLRH)	20	19	0	1	39	263	84	353	1st, Coastal	Earned Coastal Semifinal bye Won Coastal Final (Power); Won Final Four (Tigers); Won Jason Cup Final (Surge)
1999 (RHI)	26	21	3	2	44	197	127	403	1st, Western	Earned Western Semifinal bye Won Western Final (Rhinos); Lost Murphy Cup Final (Vipers)
RHI Totals	138	109	28	7	225	1119	837	2930		

== Radio coverage ==
From 1994 to '96, Bullfrogs games were regularly available on radio. The 1994 season broadcasts were on KMAX-FM and the next two seasons' games were on KPLS. Lew Stowers, a business associate of longtime Los Angeles Dodgers manager Tommy Lasorda, was the play-by-play announcer.
