= ARCO Arena =

Arena in Sacramento, California, United States

- The Old Barn; Arco
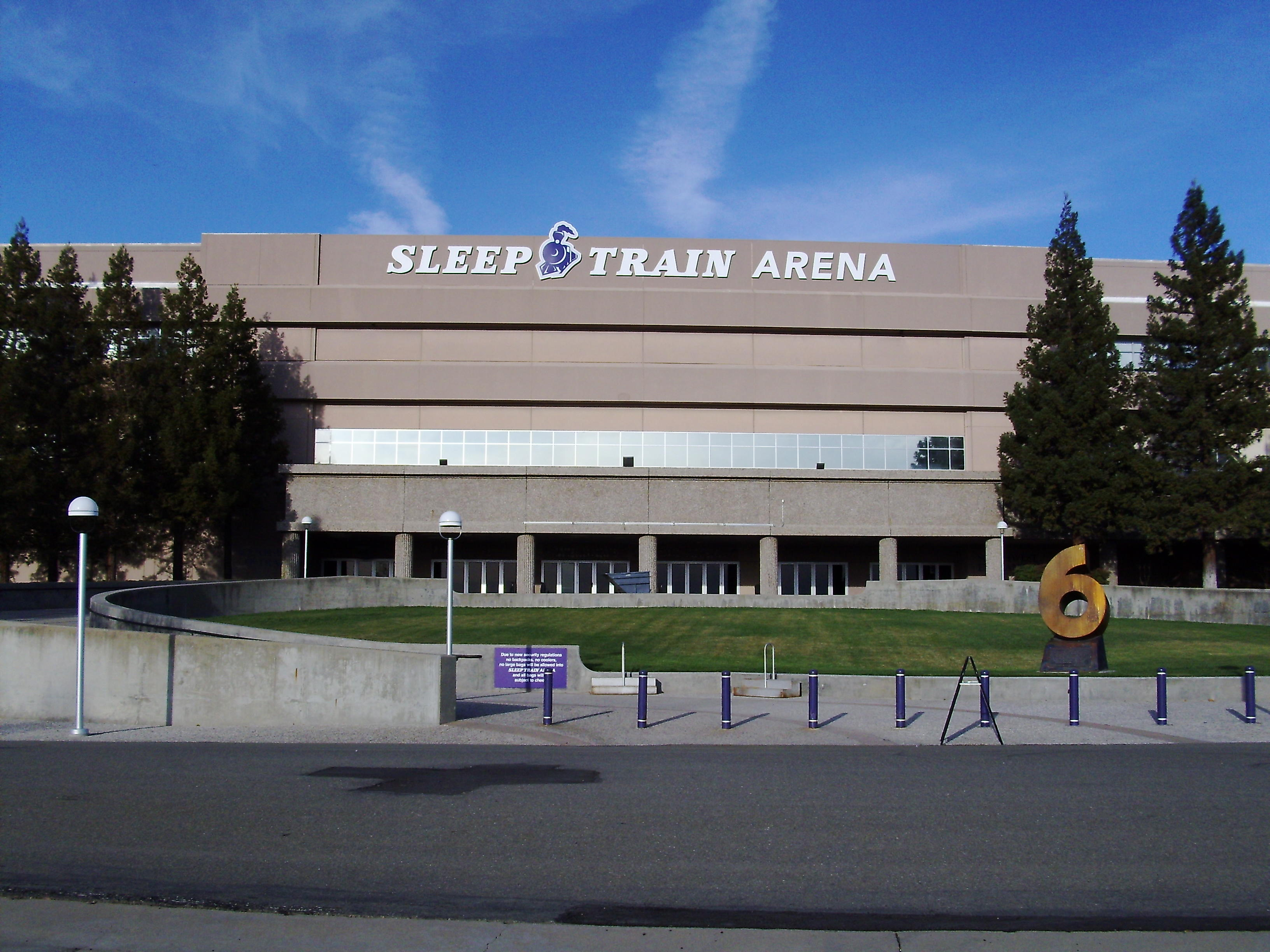
- Sleep Train Arena exterior
- Interactive map of ARCO Arena
- Former names: ARCO Arena (1988–2011, 2022); Power Balance Pavilion (2011–2012); Sleep Train Arena (2012–2022)
- Address: 1 Sports Parkway
- Location: Sacramento, California
- Coordinates: 38°38′57″N 121°31′5″W
- Capacity: Basketball and concerts: 17,317; Indoor soccer: 10,632

Construction
- Groundbreaking: September 5, 1986
- Opened: November 8, 1988
- Closed: March 19, 2022
- Demolished: August–October 2022
- Cost: $40 million
- Architect: Rann Haight
- Structural engineer: Integrated Design Group
- Services engineer: ACCO Engineered Systems
- General contractors: Lukenbill Construction Co., Inc.

Tenants
- Sacramento Kings (NBA) (1988–2016); Sacramento Attack (AFL) (1992); Sacramento Knights (CISL/WISL) (1993–2001); Sacramento River Rats (RHI) (1994–1996); Sacramento Monarchs (WNBA) (1997–2009)

ARCO Arena (known as Power Balance Pavilion from 2011 to 2012 and Sleep Train Arena from 2012 until 2022) was a multi-purpose indoor arena located in Sacramento, California, United States. Opened in 1988, it was the home of the Sacramento Kings of the National Basketball Association (NBA) from 1988 to 2016. It hosted nearly 200 spectator events each year. The arena was named for ARCO, a Los Angeles–based independent oil and gas company at the time that today is now a brand owned by Findlay, Ohio–based Marathon Petroleum. It was later named for Sleep Train, a chain of mattress and bed retailers based in Rocklin, California, that at the time of the agreement was a subsidiary of Mattress Firm, a Houston-based retailer that has since re-branded all Sleep Train stores as Mattress Firm. Several major entertainers have performed at the venue, including Bruno Mars, Britney Spears, and Linkin Park.

== History ==
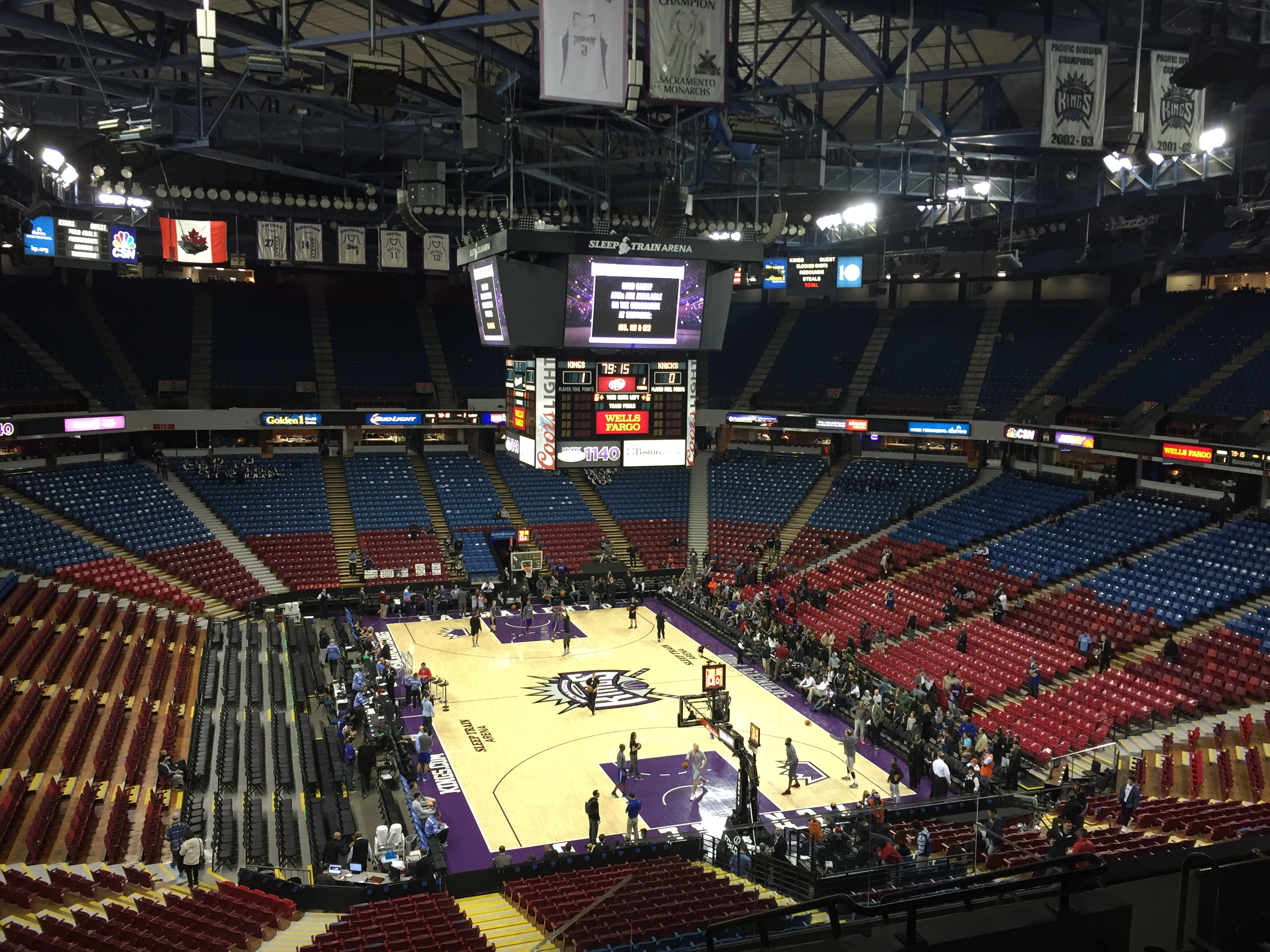
Inside Sleep Train Arena before a Kings game in 2015.

The original ARCO Arena, where the Kings played their home games for three seasons (1985–1988) after moving from Kansas City, had a capacity of 10,333 seats. According to his memoir, Bob Whitsitt, then the Kings’ vice president, developed and sold the arena’s naming-rights sponsorship to ARCO after owner Gregg Lukenbill proposed the idea.It was located at 1625 North Market, and is now a mixed-use office building.

This arena was also the home for the Sacramento Attack of the Arena Football League in 1992, their only season, the WNBA's Sacramento Monarchs until they folded in 2009 and the Sacramento River Rats of Roller Hockey International.

ARCO Arena was located in a once isolated area on the expanding northern outskirts of the city. It was constructed at a cost of just $40 million, the lowest of any venue in the NBA. It was the smallest arena in the NBA with a seating capacity of 17,317, and had 30 luxury suites and 412 club seats. It hosted such varied events as concerts, ice shows, rodeos and monster truck rallies. At one time, nearly two million spectators from throughout Northern California visited ARCO Arena in a year. The configuration for ice shows and ice hockey actually ran perpendicular to the basketball court with the normal sideline seating being retractable to allow for an international standard ice rink.

The arena was never intended to be a long-term facility – being a relic of the 1980s, it lacked a lot of amenities found later in more modern stadiums, like digital signage, spacious locker rooms, and wide concourses. NCAA cited that the arena was not adequate for college basketball (let alone the NBA), prompting plans to build a new facility.

LeBron James, the NBA's all-time leading scorer, made his career regular season debut with the Cleveland Cavaliers at the arena on October 29, 2003. Despite losing the game to the Sacramento Kings, James scored 25 points.

In 2006, there was a campaign to build a new $600 million facility in downtown Sacramento, which was to be funded by a quarter cent sales tax increase over 15 years; voters overwhelmingly rejected ballot measures Q and R, leading to the NBA publicly calling for a new arena to be built at another well-known Sacramento facility, Cal Expo, the site of California's state fair.

The original namesake sponsor of the arena was ARCO. On March 19, 2007, the Maloof brothers announced a multi-year agreement extending the naming rights of ARCO Arena. ARCO's sponsorship agreement ran out in February 2011. The arena was renamed Power Balance Pavilion on March 1, 2011, for its new sponsor, Power Balance, a manufacturer of sports wristbands. On October 15, 2012, the arena assumed its final name when The Sleep Train purchased the naming rights.

The arena's center-hung scoreboard was designed as a joint venture between Panasonic and White Way Sign. Originally it contained four LCD video screens (one on each side) plus enough room for two players' stats on each team; as pro basketball grew in popularity, the scoreboard was upgraded in 1991 so that stats for five players on each team could be shown; the original video screens were replaced a decade later with Panasonic Astrovision LED video screens.

The last Kings home game at Sleep Train Arena was on April 9, 2016, a 114–112 win against the Oklahoma City Thunder. The last points scored in the arena were two free throws by the Kings' Rudy Gay with one second left to clinch the game for the Kings.

The last ticketed event at Sleep Train Arena was the Ringling Bros. and Barnum & Bailey Circus on September 19, 2016. The circus also opened the arena back in 1988. The last planned non-ticketed event was Sacramento State's winter commencement ceremonies on December 17, 2016.

In November 2018, officials from the Sacramento Zoo explored the possibility of moving the zoo to the 183-acre (0.74 km^{2}) ARCO Arena site, citing the need for more space and the constraints of their current location at William Land Park; however, the Kings, who control the arena site, have conflicting plans to replace the arena with a mixed-use development with 1.18 million square feet (109,600 m^{2}) of commercial space and 2,000 residential units.

Once closed, the arena still hosted occasional events such as conferences and swap meets. Jehovah's Witnesses used the arena for an extended stay in 2019. In April 2020, state health officials announced that the Sleep Train Arena would be converted into a temporary hospital in response to the COVID-19 pandemic in California.

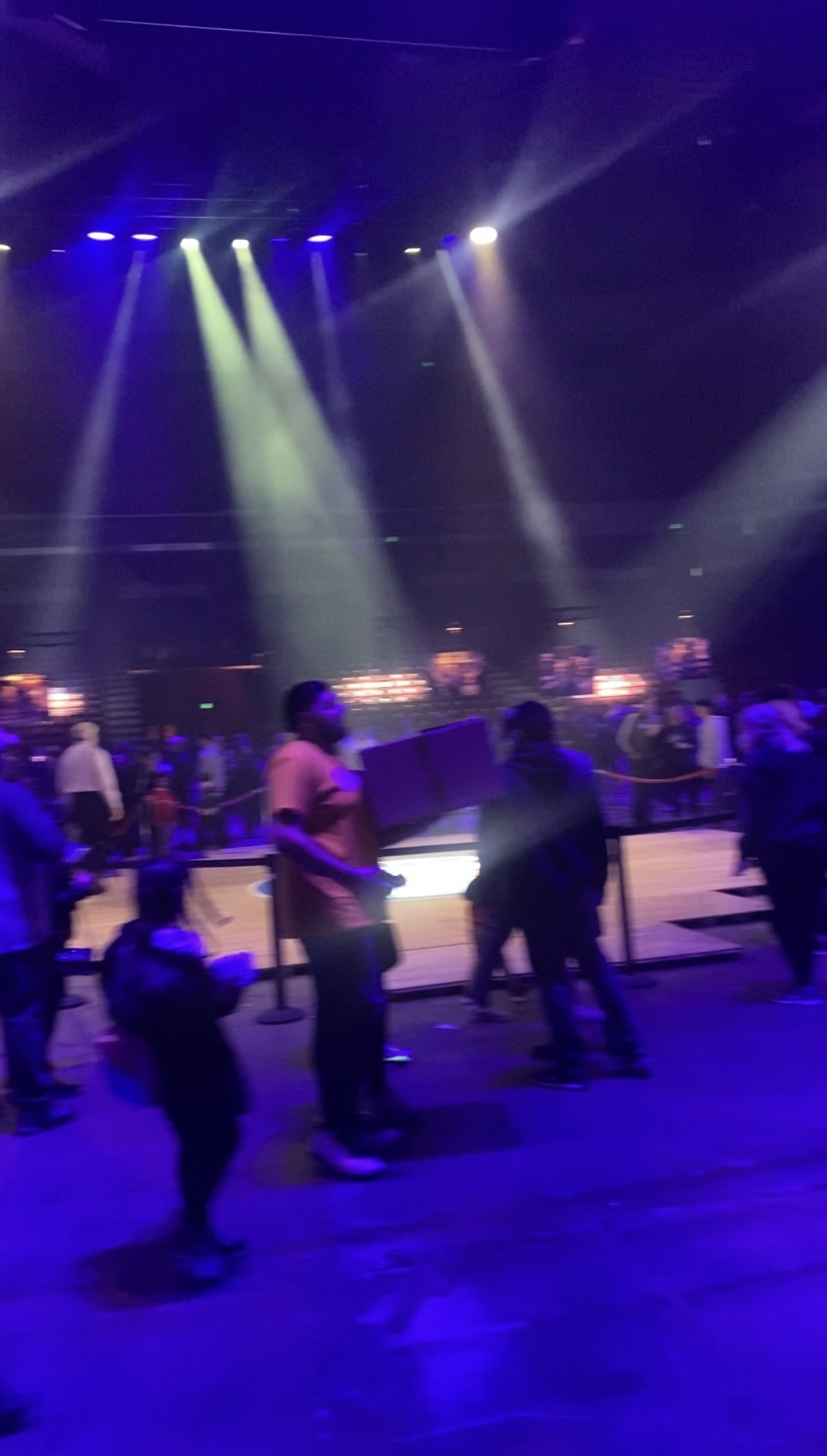
Inside ARCO Arena during its farewell event on March 19, 2022

In June 2021, the Sacramento Kings and the City of Sacramento announced that the site had been donated to California Northstate University, and that a medical school and hospital will be built there. On March 19, 2022, the Sacramento Kings hosted the final ever event at the arena, reverting to the original ARCO Arena name for a free farewell event attended by thousands of fans and Kings personnel/alumni. Fans were allowed to enter the arena, reminisce about their memories there, and say their goodbyes before the arena's impending demolition. Demolition plans were formally submitted to the City of Sacramento, and after an environmental hold on the demolition plans went through. The demolition process began on August 9, 2022, and was completed in October 2022. The site of the arena is still open to the public, although it is mostly abandoned; the parking lot is still the site of the Sacramento Antique Faire.

== Events ==
=== High school basketball ===
ARCO Arena hosted several state high school basketball championship games (1992, 1996, 1998–2009, 2011–2014, 2016).

=== College sports ===
The arena also hosted NCAA men's basketball tournaments multiple times and was the host site for the 2007 NCAA Volleyball Championships.

=== WWE ===
ARCO Arena hosted several WWE events including the 1993 Royal Rumble, Judgment Day 2001, and The Bash in 2009.

=== MMA ===
ARCO Arena played host to four Ultimate Fighting Championship events: UFC 65, UFC 73, UFC on Fox: Johnson vs. Benavidez 2 and UFC 177. The arena hosted World Extreme Cagefighting's first ever pay-per-view event, WEC 48, on April 24, 2010. It also hosted the WEC's two biggest events ever, WEC 34, Faber vs. Pulver 1, and WEC 41, Brown vs. Faber 2, with an average of 1,300,500 viewers on Versus each. It also hosted WEC.

=== Other events ===
Other notable events include the five-day 1995 Billy Graham Greater Sacramento Crusade, which 177,000 people attended. A crowd of 47,500 people reportedly showed up on one night of the event, when Michael W. Smith was the musical guest; only 18,000 people were permitted inside and many watched on outside television screens.

ARCO Arena hosted many graduation celebrations for local high schools.

The arena hosted a PBR Built Ford Tough Series bull riding event every year from 2005 to 2016.

ArCo Arena was also home to Monster Jam, and Arenacross.

== ARCO Park ==
ARCO Park was an unfinished multi-purpose stadium directly north of the arena. The original plan was to have a Triple–A minor-league baseball stadium adjacent to the basketball arena. The stadium would have been capable of expansion to accommodate both a Major League Baseball team (possibly the Oakland Athletics) and a National Football League team (possibly the-then Los Angeles Raiders). However, the facility was never finished because the Sacramento Sports Association ran out of money during construction in 1989 and a team was never secured. A tunnel connecting the basketball arena to the unfinished stadium remained; the tunnel was colloquially known as the "clown cave", as clowns from the Ringling Bros. and Barnum & Bailey Circus used the tunnel as a dress and rehearsal space. With the closure of ARCO Arena and the subsequent redevelopment of the site into California Northstate University's Medical Center Campus, the remnants of the cancelled stadium are likely to be demolished. In a rather ironic twist, the Oakland Athletics would eventually relocate to Sutter Health Park in West Sacramento (albeit temporarily) in 2024 while awaiting the construction of their new ballpark in Las Vegas in 2028.

== Popular culture ==
There is an instrumental song called "Arco Arena" on the album Comfort Eagle by Sacramento band Cake. The band also released a version of the song with lyrics as a B-Side. The music video for Bell Biv DeVoe's "She's Dope" was filmed at the arena.

The arena set a Guinness World Record for loudest sports roar by reaching 126 decibels on November 15, 2013.

Events and tenants
Preceded by ARCO Arena I	Home of the Sacramento Kings; 1988-2016	Succeeded by Golden 1 Center
Preceded by Nassau Coliseum	Home of The Great American Bash; 2009	Succeeded by final
