= Las Vegas Flash =

- City: Las Vegas, Nevada
- Founded: 1993
- Home arena: Thomas & Mack Center
- Colors: Violet, Scarlet, Orange, Black
- Murphy Cups: None
- Conference Championships: None
- Division Championships: None

Franchise history
- Utah Rollerbees (1993); Las Vegas Flash (1994)

The Las Vegas Flash were an inline hockey team which existed for one season in 1994. The Flash were a part of Roller Hockey International. The team's home games were played at the Thomas & Mack Center.

The franchise was previously known as:

- Utah Rollerbees (1993) - The team played in the Salt Palace II in Salt Lake City. The franchise was replaced by the Utah Sun Dogs (1997–99).

The franchise was replaced by:

- Las Vegas Coyotes (1999).

== Leading scorers ==
- 1994: Rich Chernomaz (24 goals, 30 assists)

== Team records ==
- Most goals: Rich Chernomaz, 24
- Most goals, season: Rich Chernomaz, 24 (1994)
- Most assists: Rich Chernomaz, 30
- Most assists, season: Rich Chernomaz, 30 (1994)
- Most points: Rich Chernomaz, 54
- Most points, season: Rich Chernomaz, 54 (1994)
- Most penalty minutes: Kevin Quinn, 83
- Most penalty minutes, season: Kevin Quinn, 83 (1994)
- Most games played: Ross Harris, 22

== Season-by-season record ==
Season	W	L	OTL	Points	Finish	Playoffs
1994	6	15	1	13	6th in Pacific Div.	did not qualify
