= Long Island Jawz =

- City: Uniondale, New York
- Founded: 1996
- Home arena: Nassau Veterans Memorial Coliseum
- Colors: Black, Blue, Red, White
- Murphy Cups: None
- Conference Championships: None
- Division Championships: None

Franchise history
- Long Island Jawz (1996)

The Long Island Jawz were a professional roller hockey team based in Uniondale, New York, United States that played in Roller Hockey International. They played only one year until a dispute with the New York Islanders caused the team to cease operations. The team was coached by Phil DeGaetano who played professionally for the Detroit Red Wings minor league affiliate.

The name "Jawz" was selected in November 1995 from three finalists in a contest to choose the team nickname, beating out the alternatives of Gladiators and Roller Ducks.

With six goals in a 14-12 final, Tony Szabo of the Jawz was named the most valuable player at the 1996 RHI All-Star Game. The team finished the 1996 season with a record of 16-9-3. With 48 goals and 53 assists in 23 games, Hugo Bélanger was named as the 1996 player of the year, in a season in which he became the first RHI player to have a season with 100 points, though he left the team with five games left in the season to sign with a European ice hockey team.
