= Montreal Roadrunners =

- City: Montreal, Quebec
- Founded: 1994
- Home arena: Montreal Forum (1994–1995); Molson Centre (1996–1997)
- Colours: Red, Grey, Black, White
- Murphy Cups: None
- Conference Championships: 1995
- Division Championships: 1995

Franchise history
- Montreal Roadrunners (1994 - 1997)

The Montreal Roadrunners played from 1994 to 1997 in the Roller Hockey International. Their home games were at the Montreal Forum (1994–1996) and the Molson Centre (1996–1997). They were finalists for the Murphy Cup in 1995.

Former Montreal Canadiens Hall of Famer Yvan Cournoyer led the team and gave it his own nickname, feeling that roller hockey matched his former playing style. The Roadrunners had an average attendance of 7,299 people at the Forum in their inaugural season, a record among RHI's Canadian franchises and the best single-season attendance total for any RHI team aside from the Anaheim Bullfrogs.

== Alumni who also played in the NHL ==
- Francis Bouillon
- Daniel Gauthier
- Stephane Charbonneau
- Mario Doyon
- Patrice Lefebvre
- Eric Messier
- Corrado Micalef

== Season-by-season record ==
Season	GP	W	L	OLT	PTS	PCT	Playoffs
1997	24	9	10	5	23	.479	Lost semifinal
1996	28	14	11	3	31	.554	Missed playoffs
1995	24	15	6	3	33	.688	Lost final
1994	22	13	9	0	26	.591	Lost semifinal
