= Connecticut Coasters =

- City: New Haven, Connecticut; Sacramento, California
- Founded: 1993
- Home arena: New Haven Memorial Coliseum (1993); ARCO Arena (1994–1996); Cal Expo Amphitheatre (1997)

Franchise history
- Connecticut Coasters (1993); Sacramento River Rats (1994–1997)

The Connecticut Coasters were a Roller Hockey International franchise based in New Haven, Connecticut, that played only in the 1993 season before moving to California and becoming the Sacramento River Rats.

Their team colors were teal, purple, and silver. They played at New Haven Memorial Coliseum under the joint ownership of the league and arena.

The Coasters finished 3rd in their division and 7th in the league with a 7–5–2 record, and faced the Anaheim Bullfrogs in the first round of the playoffs, a team that finished with the league's best record and went on to win the inaugural Murphy Cup. Despite four goals from Brian Horan, the Coasters lost the one-game playoff by a score of 15–8 to the Bullfrogs; Goalie Neil Walsh kept the Coasters in the game, despite being outshot by a 28–15 margin.

== Season record ==
Year GP W L OTL PTS PCT GF GA PIM
1993 14 7 5 2 16 .571 124 112 332

== Moving to Sacramento ==
In 1994, the Connecticut Coasters moved to Sacramento, California and became the Sacramento River Rats.
