= Philadelphia Bulldogs (inline hockey) =

- City: Philadelphia, Pennsylvania
- Founded: 1994
- Folded: 1996
- Home arena: Spectrum (1994 - 1995); CoreStates Spectrum (1996); Woodhaven Sports Centre (1997)
- Colours: Teal, Purple, Black, Silver, White

The Philadelphia Bulldogs were an inline hockey team based in Philadelphia, Pennsylvania. They were members of the Atlantic Division of the Eastern Conference of Roller Hockey International (RHI). They were part of the 1994 RHI Expansion.

The Bulldogs were owned by NHL player agent Ron Salcer and actor Tony Danza. During the Bulldogs first season in 1994, the team's Head Coach and General Manager was former Philadelphia Flyers star Dave Schultz. The team was one of 12 added for the 1994, doubling the league in size to 24 after its inaugural season. In the February 1994 draft, the Bulldogs selected Dave Brown of the Philadelphia Flyers, along with Mitch Lamoureux and Tim Tookey, who would both go on to NHL careers, but were then playing for the Flyers' minor league farm team, the Hershey Bears of the American Hockey League. The Bulldogs worked with the promotional staff at The Spectrum, their home arena, and took advantage of the celebrity owners to make local appearances and star in advertisements as part of their efforts to draw ticket sales.

The Assistant Coaches were JoJoe Paterson and Special Assistant Coach Rick Mac Leish. The mascot was a bulldog named "Bruzer", who was played by Bob Strehlau 1994–1995, followed by Scott Dalfonso for the final season. Trainer was Dana Mc Guane and Assistant Trainer Chad Schultz. The team's VP of sales and marketing was Bob Kelly with Assistant General Manager Bill Crockett.

By the 1995 season, the second for the Bulldogs, the team was struggling with attendance, which was a fraction of the numbers drawn by the Flyers and was a sharp drop from the average attendance of 4,300 during the 1994 season. Coach Dave Schultz, who had been given an 18% ownership stake in the team, was fired in the face of overspending and losses of $700,000 in their first season. Season ticket sales dropped from 900 in their inaugural season to 500 for year two, while single-game sales were minimal, even after cutting ticket prices across the board by $2 Al MacIsaac was hired to replace Dave Shultz for the 1995–96 and 1996–97 seasons. The Bulldogs responded and made a deep push into the Playoffs losing to the Montreal RoadRunner in OT during the 95–96 season. MacIsaac was selected that season as the Eastern Conference Allstar Head Coach. The game was played in Anaheim California.

The team disbanded in 1996, after three seasons.
