= Motor City Mustangs =

Detroit Motor City Mustangs
- City: Detroit, Michigan
- Founded: 1995
- Home arena: Cobo Arena
- Colors: Purple, Orange, Green, Black, White
- Murphy Cups: None
- Conference Championships: None
- Division Championships: None

Franchise history
- Detroit Motor City Mustangs (1995)

The Detroit Motor City Mustangs were an American professional roller hockey team based in Detroit, Michigan, that played in Roller Hockey International. Their only season was in 1995, first game played against the Buffalo Stampede at The Aud in Buffalo, New York, on June 12. First home game was against the Minnesota Blue Ox on June 16.
