= Chicago Bluesmen =

- City: Geneva, Illinois
- Founded: 1999
- Home arena: Fox Valley Ice Arena
- Colors: Blue, Grey, Black, White
- Murphy Cups: None
- Conference Championships: None
- Division Championships: None

Franchise history
- Chicago Bluesmen (1999)

The Chicago Bluesmen were an American professional roller hockey team based at the Fox Valley Ice Arena in Geneva, Illinois, that played in Roller Hockey International. The team was coached by Eric Schneider.
