= Dallas Stallions =

- City: Dallas, Texas
- Founded: 1999
- Home arena: Reunion Arena
- Colors: Black, Gold, White
- Murphy Cups: None
- Conference Championships: None
- Division Championships: None
- Head coach: Alan May

Franchise history
- Dallas Stallions (1999)

The Dallas Stallions were an American professional roller hockey team based at Reunion Arena in Dallas, Texas, that played in Roller Hockey International. Never financially sound, the team concluded the 1999 season with scant attendance and a 7–17–0–2 record.

== Year-by-year ==
| Year | League | Reg. season | Playoffs | Avg. attendance |
|---|---|---|---|---|
| 1999 | RHI | 4th RHI, 7–17–0–2 | Lost first round | 894 |

== History ==
In the Spring of 1999, the Dallas Stallions were announced as an expansion franchise for the struggling Roller Hockey International. The team was operated on a very small budget that allowed for almost no advertising. The head coach/general manager was former NHL player Alan May. The team was made up from minor league ice hockey players. Training camp was held in the spring/summer of 1999 at Slapshot Inline Hockey arena in Arlington, Texas.

The team attempted to make a splash by drafting Central Hockey League legend Doug Lawrence. Lawrence reportedly refused to play unless he was paid additional money "under the table". A deal was finally worked out and Lawrence played in three games with the team.

The season was largely unsuccessful on every front. The team struggled on the floor, and only a handful of fans attended each home game. The Stallions and the league both quietly folded at the end of the season. May moved on to coach the Lubbock Cotton Kings of the Western Professional Hockey League.
