= Major League Roller Hockey =

American inline hockey league

- Sport: Inline hockey
- Founded: 1998, Alexandria, Virginia, United States
- First season: 1998
- CEO: Doug Jones
- President: Bill Raue
- Country: United States
- Headquarters: Alexandria, Virginia, United States
- Continent: North America
- Broadcaster: Roller Hockey TV
- Related competitions: MLRH Pro; MLRH Elite; MLRH AAA; MLRH Grassroots; MLRH Europe; MLRH Summer Cup; Slamm Hockey League
- Website: MLRH.com

Major League Roller Hockey (MLRH) is a limited liability company which operates multiple inline hockey leagues and tournaments. Headquartered in Alexandria, Virginia, MLRH is one of the only full-contact inline hockey competitions in the world.

The league was organized in 1998 in Alexandria, Virginia, United States, after the suspension of operations of a predecessor organization, Roller Hockey International (RHI), which had been founded in 1993.

MLRH draws many players with former college and pro ice hockey experience, as well as "pure" inline hockey players.

MLRH expanded to Europe in 2012 with a pan-European series of competitions spanning from top level hockey to youth and amateur competitions.

== History ==
Total MLRH world championships Defunct teams are italicized.
Team	Titles	Season
Mission Axiom	2	2011; 2012
Marple Gladiators	2	2003; 2004
D.C. Filibusters	1	
Anaheim Bullfrogs	1	1998
Boston Storm	1	2006
Breakaway Bullies	1	2013
Buffalo Wings	1	2009
Colorado Crush	1	2001
Detroit Revolution	1	2010
Dynamo Pardubice	1	2008
IHC Tunechoddy	1	2007
New Jersey Rockin' Rollers	1	2005
Rocky Mountain Wolverines	1	2000
Vourlean Veikot	1	2014
Williamsburg Warriors	1	2002
Further information: MLRH World Championship

After the suspension of Roller Hockey International (RHI) for the 1998 season, Major League Roller Hockey was founded in 1998 in Alexandria, Virginia by entrepreneur Bill Raue. The inaugural season featured two franchises from the suspended RHI (the Anaheim Bullfrogs and Buffalo Wings) and 18 new franchises, with 11 in the United States, one in Canada and six in the United Kingdom. The first games were played during the summer of 1998. Hugo Bélanger of the Virginia Vultures, former Roller Hockey International leading scorer, finished the inaugural season leading the league in goals (79), assists (79) and points (158), including a single game with 11 goals and 15 assists. The Anaheim Bullfrogs defeated the Orlando Surge to win the first Jason Cup title in front of 10,000 fans at the Arrowhead Pond in Anaheim, California.

While MLRH operated successfully in its inaugural season, the league went on hiatus for the 1999 season, citing financial challenges. Roller Hockey International returned in 1999 for one last season before folding for good. MLRH however fell victim to the demise of RHI and was brought down as professional roller hockey flamed out in 1999. According to Bill Raue, "There were so many bad feelings when RHI folded with $40 million in losses that it was virtually impossible to play at the professional level."

Returning in 2000, MLRH operated throughout the Midwest and Eastern seaboard, playing with primarily amateur players. Starting in 2005, MLRH expanded to a Super League format with the American champion facing the European champion in a world championship. In 2009, MLRH moved to a pro tour-style league before returning to a traditional home-and-home style league in 2010. Doug Jones would successfully create MLRH divisions in Southern California, Midwest, East, Sunshine and Gulf coast. The semifinals would feature So Cal vs. Midwest and Gulfcoast vs. Sunshine. So Cal would persevere and win.

MLRH brought forth "Rollerhockeytv", (rollerhockeytv.net) to viewers across the world. Two shows, TWIRH which aired 103 episodes and RHTV, a webcast of MLRH games, brought viewers "live" action of MLRH games from California and the Midwest. RHTV and TWIRH hosted by Jones, had over a million views on ustream and another 400,000 on youtube. When Raue changed the format, in 2016, TWIRH and RHTV viewership decreased by 95%.

The 2013–2014 MLRH World Championships would see Doug Jones add former NHL player, Bob Sullivan become MLRH European president and the results were the first world championships played in Mannheim, Germany which saw Vuorlean Veikot as the new MLRH Champion as they defeated the Koovee Rollers (both teams from Finland). "7" players from both teams ended up playing in the IIHF World championships and won the World title. Lassee Lapoleinen was the MLRH 2014 MVP. "Bringing Bob Sullivan in with his contacts and respect in the European market was a breath of fresh air and a huge help to bringing us credibility", stated Jones.

Also during the season, Rollerhockeytv.net scored some viewership and guests as Future NHL Hall of Famer Charlie Simmer, former NHL player Chris Kotsopolous, Former Pittsburgh Penguin owner and 2 time Stanley Cup champion Howard Baldwin, plus NHL players Patrick Maroon, Chris Kotsopoulos and Anaheim Ducks 2nd round draft pick Nic Kerdiles all appeared on the show.

During the summer of 2014, the league recruited younger players with a super league which began play starting in June at Washington, DC and had 7 teams. The season would end with the Bullies, winning their third consecutive championship as they defeated the Philadelphia Demons in the best of three in Irvine, California. The Bullies dominated the Demons. As the season ended, tensions would surface between Jones and Raue and the league would sputter to start the 2014–2015 season. Jones and Sullivan would part ways with MLRH.

In Jones's absence, MLRH adapted tournament style play with no check format. Teams embraced the non-check format and organizations like the respected San Diego Hosers, participated. "Our team had been recruited for years to play MLRH, but we did not wish to play with the full check format. Removing the checking aspect, brought us the chance to play finally and our decision to play had nothing to do with who is or was running MLRH", Joe Noris of the San Diego Hosers stated. Noris, was a four-time guest on This week in Roller Hockey. By removing the checking aspect, MLRH had brought teams back into the fold who were not playing due to the full check part of the game. Jones and Sullivan were to bring their hockey tournament European Pro Roller hockey to Las Vegas, but had to cancel due to Sullivan's illness.

As of 2020 MLRH has ceased to operate any events or tournaments.

== Game ==
Each Major League Roller Hockey PRO regulation game is played between two teams and is 34 minutes long. The game is composed of two 17-minute halves with an intermission of either one minute between the halves. At the end of the 35-minute regulation time, the team with the most goals wins the game. If a game is tied after regulation time, a 5-minute overtime ensues with the floor strength 3 on 3. If no winner is declared, four shooters for each team, in turn, take a penalty shot. The team with the most goals during the four-round shootout wins the game. If the game is still tied after the four shootout rounds, the shootout becomes sudden death. Whichever team ultimately wins the shootout is awarded a goal in the game score and thus awarded two points in the standings. The losing team in overtime or shootout is awarded only one. Shootout goals and saves are not tracked in hockey statistics; shootout statistics are tracked separately.

Shootouts do not occur during the playoffs. In the playoffs, sudden-death 20-minute four-on-four periods are played until one team scores.

== Inline hockey rink ==
Major League Roller Hockey games are played on a regulation hockey rink with rounded corners surrounded by walls and Plexiglas. MLRH standards call for a rink measuring 85 feet by 200 feet. The center line divides the floor in half, and is used to judge illegal clearing violations. Near the end of both ends of the rink, there is a thin red goal line spanning the width of the floor, which is used to judge goals and illegal clearing calls.

== Rules ==
While Major League Roller Hockey follows the general rules of inline hockey, it differs slightly from those used in National Hockey League games. Infractions of the rules can lead to either the stoppage of play in the case of offside and illegal clearing calls, or a penalty call for more serious infractions.

The league has different rules regarding being offside. First, the league only has an "offside pass" rule, which requires a stoppage in play if a pass originating from inside a team's defending zone was completed on the offensive side of the center line, unless the puck crossed the line before the player. Furthermore, the league also does not have a standard "offside" rule resulting from skate position.

Another rule difference between MLRH and the NHL rules concerns how illegal clearings are called. In MLRH, a linesman stops play due to illegal clearing the moment the puck crosses the goal line, in contrast to the NHL rules where play is stopped if a defending play (other than the goaltender) reaches the face off spot before an attacking player is able to. It is similar in that, when a team is guilty of illegally clearing the puck they are not allowed to make a line change before the following faceoff. No line change is allowed of the offending team.

MLRH also has an instigator rule for players who wear half shields and cages. Any player wearing such who receives a high sticking penalty is assessed a double minor automatically. Any player who instigates a fight wearing such, is assessed a minor automatically unless, at the discretion of the official, the player takes his helmet off to square off with his foe.

== Season structure ==
Major League Roller Hockey season is divided into an exhibition season (October), a regular season (from the first week in November through early to mid March) and a postseason (the MLRH playoffs). During the regular season, clubs play each other in a predefined schedule. The MLRH playoffs, which goes from March to the end of May, is an elimination tournament where two teams play against each other to win a single elimination game in order to advance to the next round. The final remaining team is crowned the MLRH World Champion.

In the regular season, each team plays 15 games; in tournament fashion (three games per event). Points are awarded for each game, where two points are awarded for a win, one point for losing in overtime or a shootout, and zero points for a loss in regulation.

Points are awarded for each game, where two points are awarded for a win, one point for losing in overtime or a shootout, and zero points for a loss in regulation. Among major professional sports leagues, the NHL is the only one to award a team points for losing in overtime.

At the end of the regular season, the team that finishes with the most points in each division is crowned the division champion. The three division champions along with the five other teams in the league with the next highest number of points, for a total of 8 teams, qualify for the playoffs. The division winners are seeded one through three (even if a non-division winner has a higher point total), and the next five teams with the best records in the conference are seeded four through eight. The MLRH playoffs is an elimination tournament, where two teams battle to win a single elimination game in order to advance to the next round. The first round of the playoffs, or quarterfinals, consists of the first seed playing the eighth seed, the second playing the seventh, third playing the sixth, and the fourth playing the fifth. In the second round, or semifinals, MLRH re-seeds the teams, with the top remaining seed playing the lowest remaining seed, and the other two remaining teams pairing off. In the third round, MLRH Finals, the two remaining teams play each other for the world championship.

In each round the higher-ranked team is said to be the team with the home-floor advantage. The game is played at this team's home venue. In the MLRH Finals, the game is played at a neutral-site regardless of where each team ranks.

In July 2017, Bill Raue, MLRH President and founder, announced that MLRH would be taking a hiatus for the 2017-18 season as he was committed to the production of a major film (an ice hockey inspired sports drama) with the support of the Czech Film Commission. MLRH will return in 2019, with an event in Mannheim, Germany. Mick Payne, MLRH Europe Commissioner, will be produce the Bob Sullivan Memorial tournament. Sullivan, a former NHL player with the Hartford Whalers was a long-time supporter of MLRH in Germany.
