= Los Angeles Blades =

- City: Inglewood, California
- Founded: 1993
- Folded: 1997
- Home arena: Great Western Forum
- Colors: Dark Blue, Black, Silver, White
- Murphy Cups: None
- Conference Championships: None
- Division Championships: 1994
- Owner(s): Jeanie Buss

Franchise history
- Los Angeles Blades (1993–1997)

The Los Angeles Blades were a professional inline hockey team based in Los Angeles, California. The Blades played in Roller Hockey International from 1993–1997 and played their home games at the Great Western Forum.

Two other franchises have used the name Los Angeles Blades: the Pacific Hockey League team in 1978–79 and the Western Hockey League team from 1961 to 1967.

== Franchise history ==
The Blades were one of 12 original RHI teams and were owned by Jeanie Buss, daughter of then-Los Angeles Lakers owner Jerry Buss. They played a summer schedule at the Great Western Forum, which was then the home of the NBA's Lakers and the NHL's Los Angeles Kings. The Blades posted winning records in four of the five seasons it operated, and made the playoffs every year -- unfortunately, they were eliminated all five times by their local rivals, the Anaheim Bullfrogs. RHI suspended operations after the 1997 season, and when it returned in 1999, with eight teams, the Blades were not among them. RHI folded, for good, after the 1999 season.

== Season-by-season record ==
| Season | GP | W | L | OTL | PTS | GF | GA | PIM | Finish | Playoff Record |
|---|---|---|---|---|---|---|---|---|---|---|
| 1993 | 14 | 8 | 6 | 0 | 16 | 110 | 107 | 224 | 2nd, Buss | Won Quarterfinal (Toronto), 6–5; Lost Semifinal (Anaheim), 13–4 |
| 1994 | 22 | 18 | 4 | 0 | 36 | 180 | 133 | 406 | 1st, Pacific | Won Pacific Semifinal (San Diego), 14–6, 9–8; Lost Pacific Final (Anaheim), 9–6, 9–8 |
| 1995 | 24 | 9 | 10 | 5 | 23 | 147 | 164 | 458 | 4th, Pacific | Lost Western Quarterfinal (Anaheim), 8–10, 9–1, 3–0 |
| 1996 | 28 | 16 | 11 | 1 | 33 | 160 | 155 | 438 | 2nd, Pacific | Lost Pacific Final (Anaheim), 7–5, 8–4 |
| 1997 | 24 | 11 | 8 | 5 | 27 | 166 | 155 | 405 | 3rd, Western | Lost Western Semifinal (Anaheim), 7–2, 2–5, 1–0 |
| RHI Totals | 112 | 63 | 39 | 11 | 135 | 763 | 714 | 1,931 | | |
