= Buffalo Stampede (RHI) =

- City: Buffalo, New York
- Founded: 1994
- Home arena: Buffalo Memorial Auditorium
- Colors: Black, Red, Marlin Blue, Purple, White
- Murphy Cups: 1994
- Conference Championships: 1994
- Division Championships: 1994

Franchise history
- Buffalo Stampede (1994 - 1995)

The Buffalo Stampede were a Roller Hockey International team based in Buffalo, New York that was founded in the second season of the RHI. The team played at the Buffalo Memorial Auditorium from 1994 to 1995. The team won the 1994 RHI Murphy Cup.

On September 2, 1994, the Stampede won the Murphy Cup in their inaugural season with an 8-7 win against the Portland Rage in front of a record-setting 14,175 hometown fans at the Buffalo Memorial Auditorium.

The team folded after the 1995 season. The Phoenix Cobras moved to the Albany, New York, area and changed their name to the Empire State Cobras. Games were played at the Glens Falls Civic Center in Glens Falls, New York.

The team was purchased and relocated to Buffalo where it played three more seasons in RHI as the Buffalo Wings.

== All-time roster ==
- Norm Bazin
- Paul Beraldo
- Chris Bergeron
- Larry Blair
- John Blessman
- Scott Burfoot
- Fred Carroll
- Jason Cirone
- Rick Corriveau
- Pat Curcio
- Joe Daly
- Derek DeCosty
- Bob Delorimiere
- Lou Franceschetti
- John Hendry
- Steve Herniman
- Alex Hicks
- Jamey Hicks
- Scott Humphrey
- Tom Jaeggi
- Dave Lemay
- Jim MacDougal
- Mark Major
- Craig Martin
- Chris Monzidelus
- Claude Morin
- Jay Neal
- Tom Nemeth
- Dale Reinig
- Len Soccio
- Jeff Triano
- John Vecchiarelli
- Nick Vitucci

=== Coaches ===
- Chris McSorley - 1994
- John Vecchiarelli - 1995 (Player Coach)
- Rob Ray - 1995 (Bench Coach)

=== Season-by-season record ===
Note: GP = Games played, W = Wins, L = Losses, T = Ties, OTL = Overtime Losses, Pts = Points, GF = Goals for, GA = Goals against, PIM = Penalties in minutes

Season	GP	W	L	T	OTL	Pts	GF	GA	PIM	Finish	Playoffs
1994	22	15	3	0	4	34	196	159	749	1st, Atlantic	RHI Champions
1995	23	10	13	0	0	20	169	178	520	5th, Central	Did not qualify
