= New Jersey Rockin' Rollers =

- City: East Rutherford, New Jersey
- Founded: 1994
- Folded: 1999
- Home arena: Continental Airlines Arena
- Colors: Green, Black, Yellow, White
- Conference Championships: 1997

Franchise history
- 1994–1997: New Jersey Rockin' Rollers
- 1999: New York/New Jersey Rockin' Rollers

The New Jersey Rockin' Rollers were a professional inline hockey team based in East Rutherford, New Jersey, United States that played in Roller Hockey International.

== Club formation ==
Roller hockey in the Garden State almost never happened, as the NHL's New Jersey Devils sued to prevent the team from playing in the Brendan Byrne Arena as part of a lease signed with the New Jersey Sports and Exposition Authority. New Jersey Superior Court Judge Reginald Stanton ruled in April 1994 that the essential difference between ice hockey and roller hockey meant that the tenancy of the Rockin' Rollers did not violate the terms of the Devils' lease at the facility.

The Rockin' Rollers were owned by investment banker E. Burke Ross Jr. Two radio stations also owned by Ross, WDHA-FM and WMTR-AM, held a name-the-team contest and "Rockin' Rollers" was chosen (beating out "Skunks" and "Swamp Rats"). The Rollers offered season tickets for as little as $55 for the full 11-game season and single-game tickets as low as $7, with entertainment and promotions at each game. The team brought in $540,000 in ticket revenue in the 1994 season.

Nick Fotiu, a former player with the New York Rangers and then-coach of the Nashville Knights of the East Coast Hockey League, was chosen as the team's coach and general manager. (The 41-year-old would also suit up for two contests, scoring no points but accruing six penalty minutes.)

== 1994 season ==
At the 1994 RHI player draft, held in February, the Rockin' Rollers selected identical twins Chris Ferraro and Peter Ferraro (both of whom signed with the New York Rangers instead), and inked female goaltender Manon Rhéaume; open tryouts were held at the South Mountain Arena in West Orange, New Jersey. The inaugural team included starting goalie Daniel Berthiaume and left wing Iain Duncan, both of whom had NHL experience, as well as minor league star Trevor Jobe, who led the team in scoring. New Jersey finished its first season at 11-10-1, good enough for fourth place in the Atlantic Division and a playoff spot; they were swept in the first round by Buffalo. At the box office, the Rockin' Rollers averaged 6,984 per game, third-best in 24-team RHI.

The club made history in July as both the Rollers and their opponent, the Pittsburgh Phantoms, started female goaltenders; Rhéaume faced Pittsburgh's Erin Whitten, winning 10–7.

== 1995 season ==
The RHI contracted to 19 teams in 1995. Led by top scorers Chris Valicevic and Gerry St. Cyr (who would later marry Manon Rhéaume), New Jersey (now coached by Jim Hughes) moved up to third place in the Atlantic with a 13-11-0 record. They knocked out Minnesota in the opening round of the playoffs but lost to the St. Louis Vipers in the conference semifinals, two games to one. At the gate, attendance slumped to 5,409 per game, but that was still second-best in the RHI (a distant second; Anaheim drew 10,038. Most league clubs were drawing only three to four thousand by this point).

== 1996 season ==
With a largely turned-over roster (their top scorer, Cal Ingraham, was traded to the Orlando Jackals late in the season), the Rollers slipped to 7-17-0-4, last place in the Atlantic and out of the playoffs. Attendance continued to be reasonable by pro roller-hockey standards: 5,992 per game, fifth out of 18 clubs. Coach Hughes was let go, and replaced by Bob Antolos.

== 1997 season ==
The RHI continued to shed clubs in 1997, dropping to just ten teams, including New Jersey. Minor-league sniper Tony Szabo (playing for his fourth RHI team in four seasons) led the Rockin' Rollers with 30 goals and 51 points, and New Jersey placed second in the Eastern Division at 16-8-0; attendance slipped to 4,874 per game, still fourth-best in the league.

After dispatching the Montreal Roadrunners and league-leading (and defending champion) Orlando in the playoffs, the Rollers advanced to the Murphy Cup Finals against the perennial powerhouse Anaheim Bullfrogs. But after winning the opener of the best-of-three series in California, the Bullfrogs dropped the Rollers, 9–5, at the Meadowlands to claim the Cup.

== The end ==
The Cup Final was the last game the Rockin' Rollers would ever play, as the team suspended operations after the 1997 season. RHI did not operate during 1998, but returned in 1999. The Rockin' Rollers renamed themselves the New York/New Jersey Rockin' Rollers and planned to move to the Mennen Arena in Morristown, New Jersey, as well as New York City, but folded before the 1999 season began.
