= Buffalo Wings (inline hockey) =

- City: Amherst, New York
- Founded: 1994
- Home arena: Marine Midland Arena (1997) Buffalo State Ice Arena (1998-1999) Northtown Center (2008-present)
- Colors: Black, jade, grape, silver, white
- Head coach: Eric Haak

Franchise history
- 1994–1995: Phoenix Cobras
- 1996: Empire State Cobras
- 1997–present: Buffalo Wings

The Buffalo Wings are an inline hockey team, playing in Major League Roller Hockey and formerly in Roller Hockey International, that is based in the city of Buffalo, New York.

== History ==
The Buffalo Wings franchise was originally the Phoenix Cobras from 1994 to 1995, and the Empire State Cobras in 1996.

The 1996 Cobras consisted of former Buffalo Stampede players who joined the team after their franchise folded following the 1995 Roller Hockey International season.

Relocated from Glen Falls, New York and renamed as the Buffalo Wings, the team played the 1997 season at the Marine Midland Arena. The arrival of the Wings marked the return of professional roller hockey to Buffalo, having been the home of the short-lived Buffalo Stampede, which played at the Buffalo Memorial Auditorium from 1994 to 1995. From 1998 to 1999, the team played at the Buffalo State Sports Arena at Buffalo State College.

Following the demise of Roller Hockey International, the organization continues to exist to this day as a youth hockey development organization. The professional team will be returning to league play in the Professional Inline Hockey Association for the 2025-2026 season.

== Records ==
- 1994 - Phoenix Cobras - 13-11 - (Roller Hockey International / Home: Arizona Veterans Memorial Coliseum)
- 1995 - Phoenix Cobras - 11-09 - (Roller Hockey International / Home: Arizona Veterans Memorial Coliseum)
- 1996 - Empire State Cobras - 16-07 - (Roller Hockey International / Home: Glens Falls Civic Center)
- 1997 - Buffalo Wings - 06-18 - (Roller Hockey International / Home: Marine Midland Arena)
- 1998 - Buffalo Wings - 11-08 - (Major League Roller Hockey / Home: Buffalo State Sports Arena)
- 1999 - Buffalo Wings - 13-13 - (Roller Hockey International / Home: Buffalo State Sports Arena)

== Playoff records ==
- 1994 - Lost to Calgary Rad'z in Quarterfinal
- 1995 - Lost to San Jose Rhinos in Quarterfinal
- 1996 - Lost to Orlando Jackals in Quarterfinal
- 1998 - Defeated Port Huron North Americans 19–8 in Quarterfinal; Lost to Columbus Hawks in Semifinal
- 1999 - Defeated Minnesota Blue Ox in Quarterfinal (8–3 in one game playoff); Lost to St. Louis Vipers in Semifinal by a score of 11-7
