= Roller Hockey International =

Inline hockey league

- Sport: Inline hockey
- Founded: 1992; 34 years ago
- Founder: Dennis Murphy; Ralph Backstrom; Larry King
- First season: 1993; 33 years ago
- Folded: 2001; 25 years ago
- Countries: United States; Canada
- Last champion: St. Louis Vipers
- Most titles: Anaheim Bullfrogs (2)

Roller Hockey International was a professional inline hockey league that operated in North America from 1993 to 1999. It was the first major professional league for inline hockey.

== History ==
League president Dennis Murphy had been involved in the establishment of the American Basketball Association, World Hockey Association and World TeamTennis. RHI hoped to capitalize on the inline skating boom of the early 1990s. Key parts of its success were its stance on no guaranteed contracts. Instead, teams would all split prize money.

Teams were generally made up of minor league ice hockey players playing on inline skates during the summer months between ice seasons.

Murphy saw big potential for the sport and believed that inline hockey could become the number one hockey sport in the US. The league had plans to expand to up to 24 teams, including some from Europe, by 1997. However, RHI became known for its unstable franchises, instability in the league's front office itself, little media coverage and many teams struggling to attract crowds - while the Anaheim Bullfrogs led in attendance with an average of 9,800 per game, seven teams attracted less than 4,000 per game on average, while the whole league's attendance averaged around 5,000 by 1996.

Ultimately, after five seasons of play and a fading in the inline skating boom, RHI folded in 1998 with two of its franchises joining Major League Roller Hockey: the Buffalo Wings and its premier club, the Anaheim Bullfrogs. RHI was revived in 1999, with a 10-team roster that included five holdovers that had played in RHI in 1997: the Anaheim Bullfrogs, Buffalo Wings, Minnesota Blue Ox, San Jose Rhinos and St. Louis Vipers.

The league cancelled the 2000 season and the league finally ceased operations in 2001 when their sites were limited to arenas in California.

The St. Louis Vipers were resurrected in 2020 as an expansion team of the National Roller Hockey League, but the league cancelled their plans for the 2020 season soon afterward due to the COVID-19 pandemic and has not returned ever since, so the new St. Louis Vipers never played a single game.

== Rules ==
The rules in the RHI were similar to but not identical to those of ice hockey. Besides the obvious difference of playing on a floor instead of ice, the RHI had four players and a goalie at a time on the playing surface opposed to ice hockey's five and a goalie. Minor penalties were only a minute and a half as opposed to two minutes and major penalties were four minutes instead of five.

There were no blue lines and therefore no offside; however, there was still illegal clearing (icing) and a different version of offside—a player could skate over the red line before the puck; however, the player couldn't receive a pass over the line. The puck itself was lighter, at 3 1/2 oz. and made of red plastic as opposed to a 5 1/2 oz. black rubber ice hockey puck. There were four 12-minute quarters opposed to the NHL's three 20-minute periods. A tied score at the end of regulation time in the regular season would go straight to a shootout instead of overtime.

The playoffs followed a best-of-three series format; however, the third game was not a full 48 minute game. Instead it was just a regular 12-minute quarter called "the mini game". If the teams were tied at the end of the quarter a sudden-death overtime period would follow.

== Teams ==
Note: RHI 1993–97, revived RHI 1999

Roller Hockey International Progression
Year	Teams	Games played
1993	12 teams	14 games
1994	24 teams	22 games
1995	19 teams	24 games
1996	18 teams	28 games
1997	10 teams	24 games
1998	No season	
1999	8 teams	26 games

- Anaheim Bullfrogs (1993–1997; 1999)
- Calgary Rad'z (1993–1994)
- Connecticut Coasters (1993) / Sacramento River Rats (1994–1997)
- Florida Hammerheads (1993–1994)
- Los Angeles Blades (1993–1997; 1999)
- Oakland Skates (1993–1996)
- Portland Rage (1993–1994)
- San Diego Barracudas (1993–1996) / Ontario Barracudas (1998–99)
- St. Louis Vipers (1993–1997; 1999)
- Toronto Planets (1993)
- Utah Rollerbees (1993) / Las Vegas Flash (1994)
- Vancouver Voodoo (1993–1996)
- Atlanta Fire Ants (1994) / Oklahoma Coyotes (1995–1996) / Las Vegas Coyotes (1999)
- Buffalo Stampede (1994–1995)
- Chicago Cheetahs (1994–1995)
- Edmonton Sled Dogs (1994) / Orlando Rollergators (1995, renamed Orlando Jackals 1996–1997)
- Minnesota Arctic Blast (1994; 1996)
- Montreal Roadrunners (1994–1997)
- New England Stingers (1994) / Ottawa Loggers (1995–1996, renamed Ottawa Wheels in 1997)
- New Jersey Rockin' Rollers (1994–1997)
- Philadelphia Bulldogs (1994–1996)
- Phoenix Cobras (1994–1995) / Empire State Cobras (1996) / Buffalo Wings (1997; 1999)
- Pittsburgh Phantoms (1994)
- San Jose Rhinos (1994–1997; 1999)
- Tampa Bay Tritons (1994)
- Minnesota Blue Ox (1995; 1999)
- Detroit Motor City Mustangs (1995)
- Denver Daredevils (1996–1997)
- Long Island Jawz (1996–1997)
- Chicago Bluesmen (1999)
- Dallas Stallions (1999)

== Expansion ==
Year	Teams	Expansion	Defunct	Suspended	Return from Hiatus	Relocated	Name Changes
1993	12	Anaheim Bullfrogs; Calgary Rad'z; Connecticut Coasters; Florida Hammerheads; Los Angeles Blades; Oakland Skates; Portland Rage; St. Louis Vipers; San Diego Barracudas; Toronto Planets; Utah Rollerbees; Vancouver Voodoo					
1994	24	Atlanta Fire Ants; Buffalo Stampede; Chicago Cheetahs; Edmonton Sled Dogs; Minnesota Arctic Blast; Montreal Roadrunners; New England Stingers; New Jersey Rockin' Rollers; Philadelphia Bulldogs; Phoenix Cobras; Pittsburgh Phantoms; San Jose Rhinos; Tampa Bay Tritons	Toronto Planets			Connecticut → Sacramento River Rats; Utah → Las Vegas Flash	
1995	19	Detroit Motor City Mustangs; Minnesota Blue Ox	Calgary Rad'z; Florida Hammerheads; Las Vegas Flash; Pittsburgh Phantoms; Portland Rage; Tampa Bay Tritons	Minnesota Arctic Blast		New England → Ottawa Loggers; Atlanta → Oklahoma Coyotes; Edmonton → Orlando Rollergators	
1996	18	Denver Daredevils; Long Island Jawz	Buffalo Stampede; Chicago Cheetahs; Detroit Motor City Mustangs	Minnesota Blue Ox; Oklahoma Coyotes	Minnesota Arctic Blast	Phoenix → Empire State Cobras	Orlando Jackals (Rollergators)
1997	10		Minnesota Arctic Blast; Philadelphia Bulldogs; San Diego Barracudas; Vancouver Voodoo	Oakland Skates; Oklahoma Coyotes		Empire State → Buffalo Wings	Ottawa Wheels (Loggers)
1998	0		Denver Daredevils; Long Island Jawz; Montreal Roadrunners; Oakland Skates; Orlando Jackals; Ottawa Wheels; Sacramento River Rats				
1999	8	Chicago Bluesmen; Dallas Stallions			Minnesota Blue Ox	Oklahoma Coyotes → Las Vegas Coyotes	

== Conferences ==
The Eastern Conference and Western Conference were created when RHI doubled in size to 24 teams in 1994 after its first series of expansion and realigned its teams into two conferences and four divisions. Prior to the 1994 realignment, Roller Hockey International divided its teams into only three divisions and no conferences.

From 1994 through 1996, the Eastern Conference was divided into the Atlantic Division and the Central Division, which were both successors to the Murphy Division. Starting in 1997, the conferences had no divisions.

From 1994 through 1996, the Western Conference comprised teams divided into two divisions: Northwest Division and Pacific Division. Starting in 1997 the conferences had no divisions.

=== Eastern Conference champions ===
- 1994 - Buffalo Stampede (won Cup)
- 1995 - Montreal Roadrunners
- 1996 - Orlando Jackals (won Cup)
- 1997 - New Jersey Rockin' Rollers
- 1998 - No Season
- 1999 - St. Louis Vipers (won Cup)

=== Western Conference champions ===
- 1994 - Portland Rage
- 1995 - San Jose Rhinos (won Cup)
- 1996 - Anaheim Bullfrogs
- 1997 - Anaheim Bullfrogs (won Cup)
- 1998 - No Season
- 1999 - Anaheim Bullfrogs

== Murphy Cup championship winners ==
- 1993 - Anaheim Bullfrogs def. Oakland Skates
- 1994 - Buffalo Stampede def. Portland Rage
- 1995 - San Jose Rhinos def. Montreal Roadrunners
- 1996 - Orlando Jackals def. Anaheim Bullfrogs
- 1997 - Anaheim Bullfrogs def. New Jersey Rockin' Rollers
- 1998 - No season (MLRH Champion: Anaheim Bullfrogs)
- 1999 - St. Louis Vipers def. Anaheim Bullfrogs

Total Murphy Cup Championships
Team	Titles	Runner up
Anaheim Bullfrogs	2	2
St. Louis Vipers	1	0
Orlando Jackals	1	0
San Jose Rhinos	1	0
Buffalo Stampede	1	0
Oakland Skates	0	1
Portland Rage	0	1
Montreal Roadrunners	0	1
New Jersey Rockin' Rollers	0	1

== Licensing ==
The league inspired at least one video game, Super Nintendo's RHI Roller Hockey '95, although the game was never released.

There was also a call-in style stats, scores and interview hotline where fans could call in following games. The phone number was 1-800-741-4RHI. This line was updated nightly following each game.

== Media coverage ==
In the 1994 and '95 seasons, there was a regular schedule of games on ESPN2. Craig Minervini was the lead play-by-play man for ESPN2 coverage and also hosted the recap show RHI Rewind on the network.

In addition, several teams had their own radio or TV contracts. For example, a number of Blades home games were seen on Prime Sports and the Bullfrogs had radio broadcasts from 1994 to '96.

== NHL alumni ==
- Ralph Barahona
- Daniel Berthiaume
- Francis Bouillon
- Darren Banks
- Frank Caprice
- Jose Charbonneau
- Ross Earl
- Nick Fotiu
- Victor Gerves
- Stefan Grogg NLA and (National Team, Switzerland)
- Radek Hamr
- Mike Kennedy
- Sasha Lakovic
- Darren Langdon
- Manny Legace
- Alain Lemieux
- Glen Metropolit
- Tyler Moss
- Steve Poapst
- Walt Poddubny
- Al Secord
- Paul Skidmore
- Peter Skudra
- Bryan Trottier
- Perry Turnbull
- Dave "Tiger" Williams
- Rick Wilson
- Bob Woods
- Harry York

== See also ==
- List of Roller Hockey International arenas
