= St. Louis Vipers =

Professional roller hockey team in Missouri, US

- City: St. Louis, Missouri
- League: Roller Hockey International
- Founded: 1993
- Folded: 1999
- Home arena: St. Louis Arena (1993–1994); Kiel Center (1995–1997, 1999)
- Colors: Red, Black, Gold, White
- Murphy Cups: 1999
- Conference Championships: 1999
- Division Championships: 1995

The St. Louis Vipers was a professional roller hockey team based in St. Louis, Missouri as a member of the now-defunct Roller Hockey International.

== History ==
The St. Louis Vipers played their first two seasons of home games in the St. Louis Arena, but moved to the newer Kiel Center in 1995. The ownership of the club was led by former NHL St. Louis Blues star Bernie Federko, who also served as the head coach.

On August 16, 1994, the Vipers played the last official sporting event at the St. Louis Arena against the Tampa Bay Tritons in front of 11,146, the second largest Vipers home crowd.

The St. Louis Vipers hosted the 1995 RHI All-Star Game on July 15, 1995 in front of 9,166 at Kiel Center. The East beat the West with a score of 14-12. Ed Anderson of the East was the game's MVP.

In 1999, the Vipers became Murphy Cup champions. It was the final year of Roller Hockey International's existence.

Over their six-year existence in the 1990s, the St. Louis Vipers had a total home attendance of 332,412 in 71 home games, an average of 4,682 per game (a few hundred less than what was seen as viable, had the league stayed afloat). The largest home crowd in Vipers history was the final regular season home game in 1997 with an announced attendance of over 14,000 against the New Jersey Rockin' Rollers.

=== Vipers 2.0 ===
A press conference was held on June 4, 2019, at Family Arena in St. Charles, Missouri, announcing the return of the St. Louis Vipers. The National Roller Hockey League announced the team along with the Vipers head coach, Perry Turnbull. Turnbull played in 608 NHL games and had 351 career points. He also coached the St. Louis Vipers of the RHI from 1993-99 seasons. The league canceled their 2020 season due to the COVID-19 pandemic, but had planned to return in 2021. However, the NRHL has made no public comments since early 2020 regarding any attempted comeback.

== Yearly records ==
Year	GP	W	L	OTL	PTS	PCT	GF	GA	PIM
1993	14	9	4	1	19	.679	104	115	292
1994	22	8	12	2	18	.409	154	173	495
1995	22	13	7	2	28	.636	166	157	520
1996	28	15	12	1	31	.554	207	209	520
1997	24	12	10	2	26	.542	174	169	339
1999	26	17	8	1	35	.673	221	168	297

== Team records ==
Player	Seasons	Stats	Notes
Christian Skoryna	(95-97, 99)	118 goals	Single season point record (80) in 1996. Single season assist record (44) in 1996.
Frank Cirone	(1994–97)	106	Single season goal record (37) in 1996.
Wayne Anchikoski	(94-97)	74	
Kevin Plager	(96,97, 99)	74	
