= Orlando Jackals =

- City: Orlando, Florida
- Founded: 1994
- Home arena: Orlando Arena (1995–1997); Northlands Coliseum (1994)
- Colors: Black, Purple, Red, Orange, White
- Murphy Cups: 1996
- Conference Championships: 1996
- Division Championships: None

Franchise history
- Edmonton Sled Dogs (1994) Orlando Rollergators (1995) Orlando Jackals (1996–1997)

The Orlando Jackals were a professional roller hockey team based in Orlando, Florida, United States that played in Roller Hockey International.

== History ==
The Edmonton Sled Dogs were established in Edmonton, Alberta, Canada, joining Roller Hockey International in 1994. The franchise moved to Orlando, Florida and became the Orlando Rollergators in 1995. The Rollergators were purchased before the start of the 1996 and were renamed the Orlando Jackals.
