= List of people with type 1 diabetes =

Type 1 diabetes, also known as juvenile diabetes, is a condition in which the body does not produce insulin, resulting in high levels of sugar in the bloodstream. Whereas type 2 diabetes is typically diagnosed in middle age and treated via diet, oral medication and/or insulin therapy, type 1 diabetes tends to be diagnosed earlier in life, and people with type 1 diabetes require insulin therapy for survival. It is significantly less common than type 2 diabetes, accounting for 5 percent of all diabetes diagnoses.

This list of notable people with type 1 diabetes includes writers, artists, athletes, entertainers, and others who have been documented as having type 1 diabetes.

== List of people ==
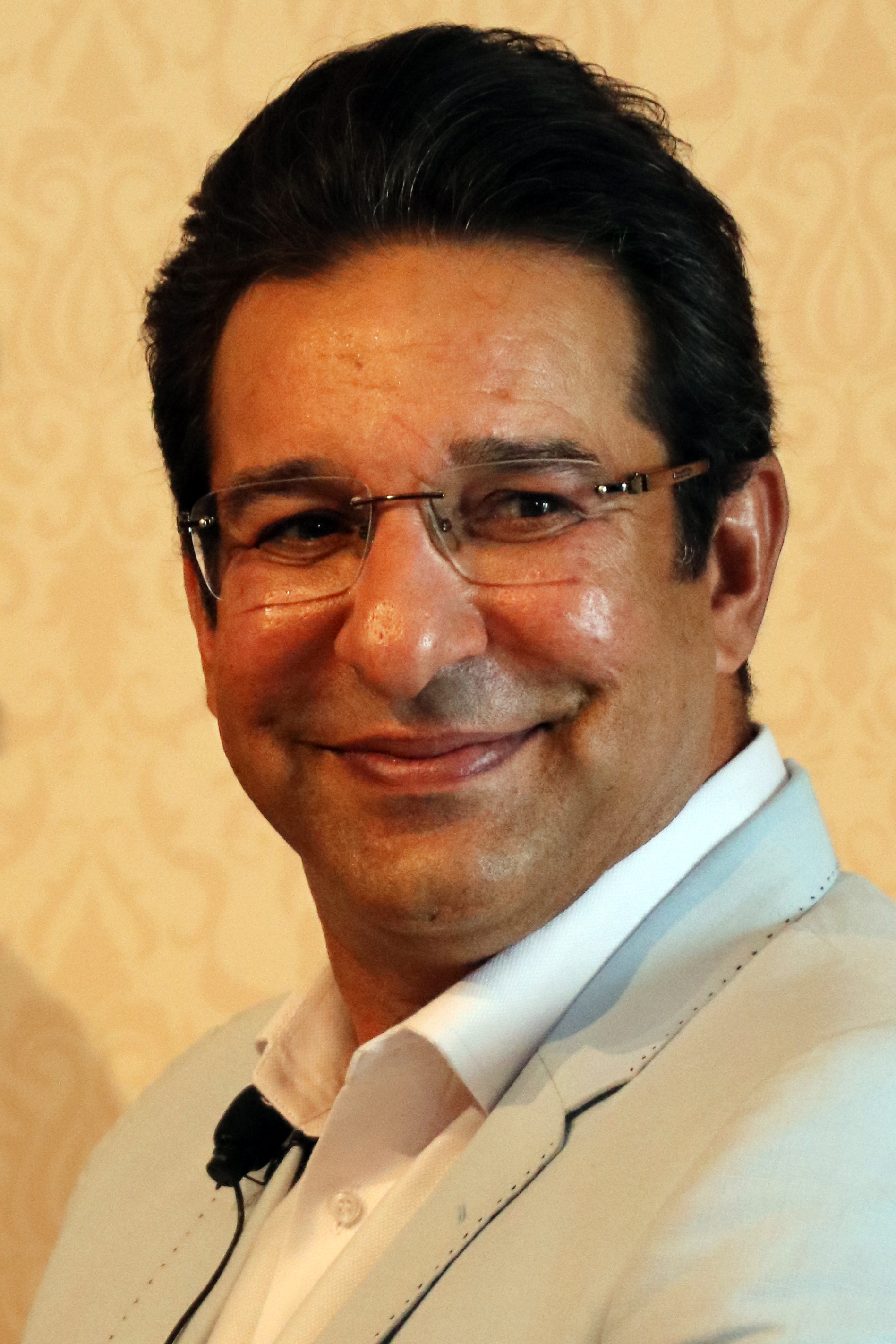
Wasim Akram

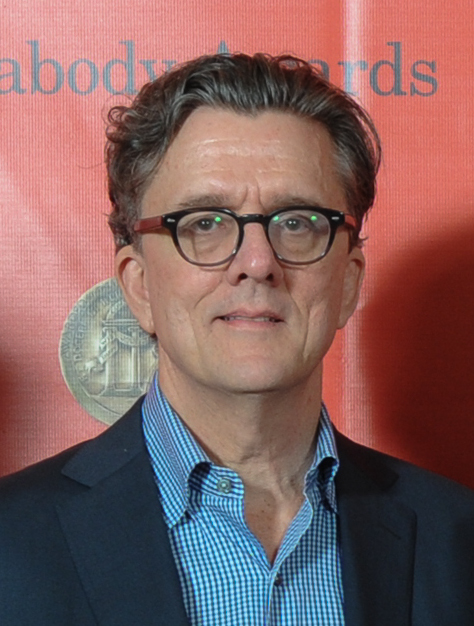
Kurt Andersen

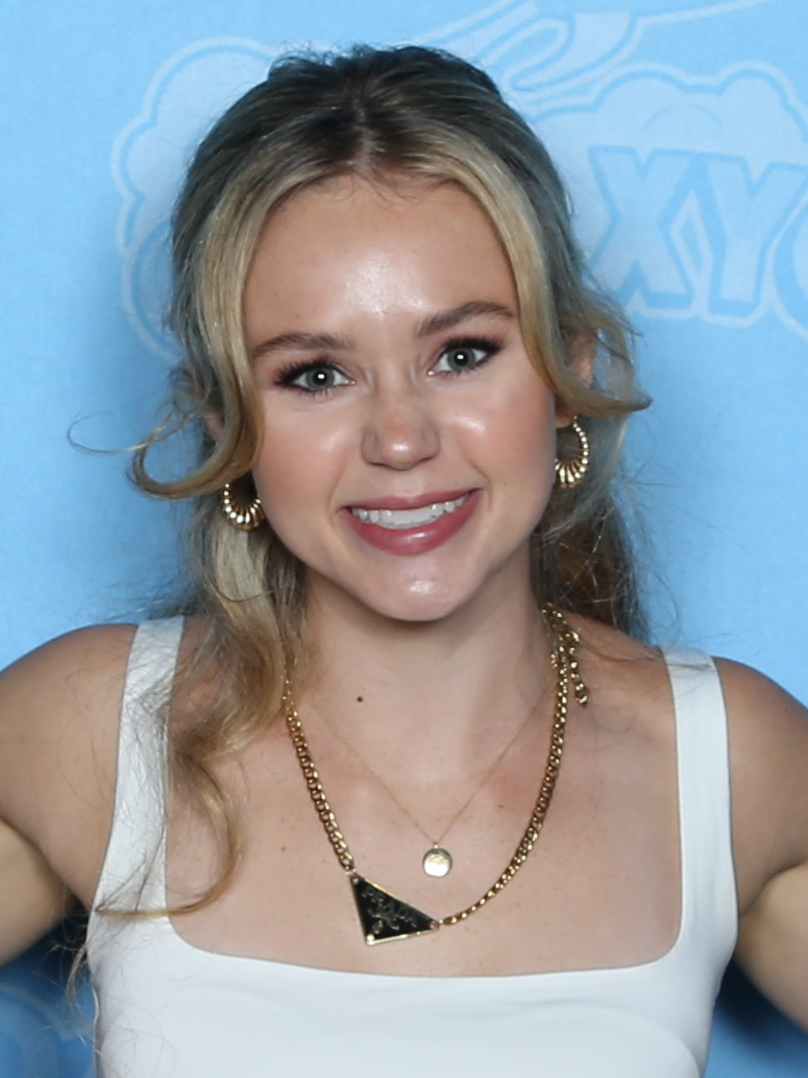
Brec Bassinger

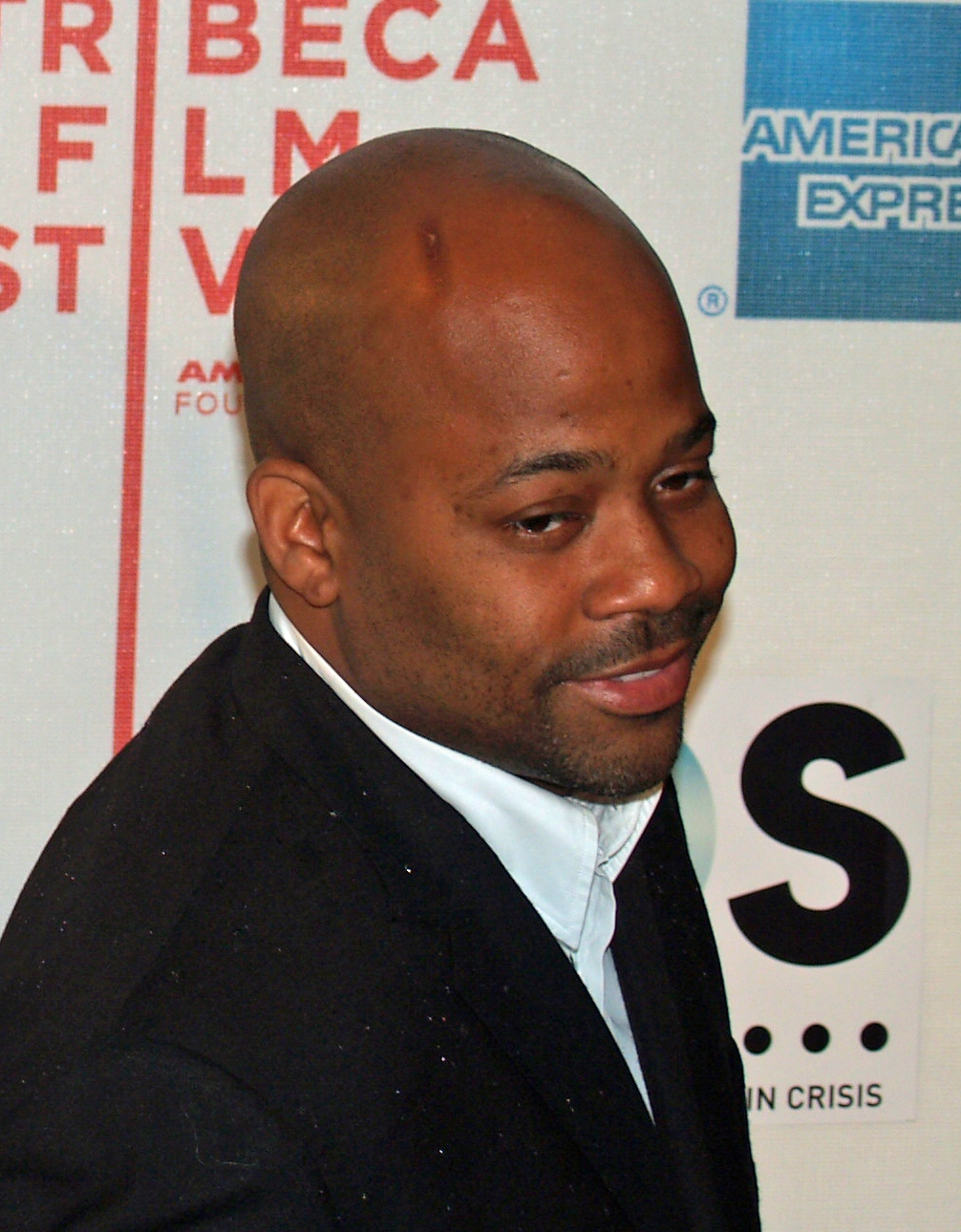
Damon Dash

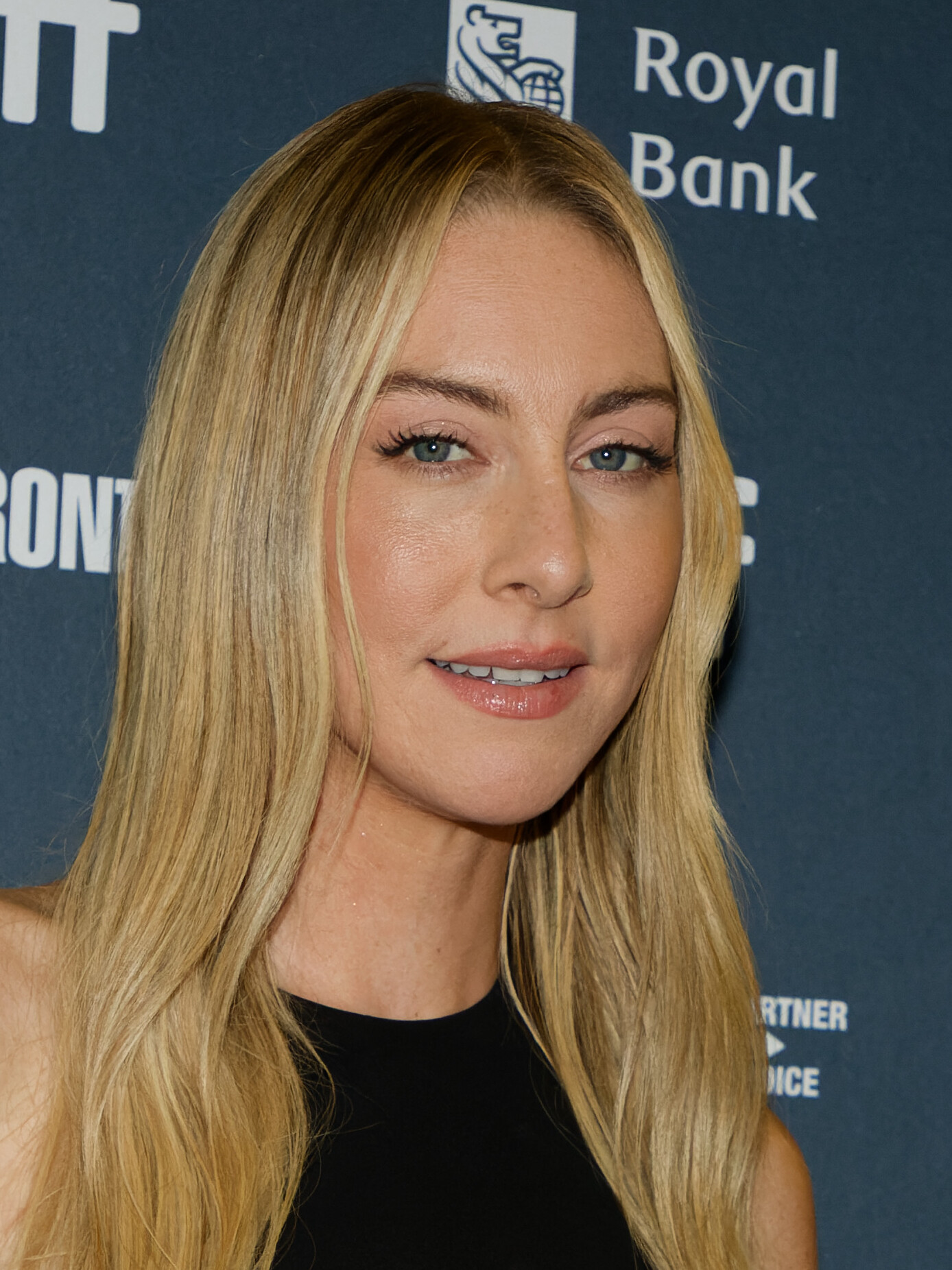
Este Haim

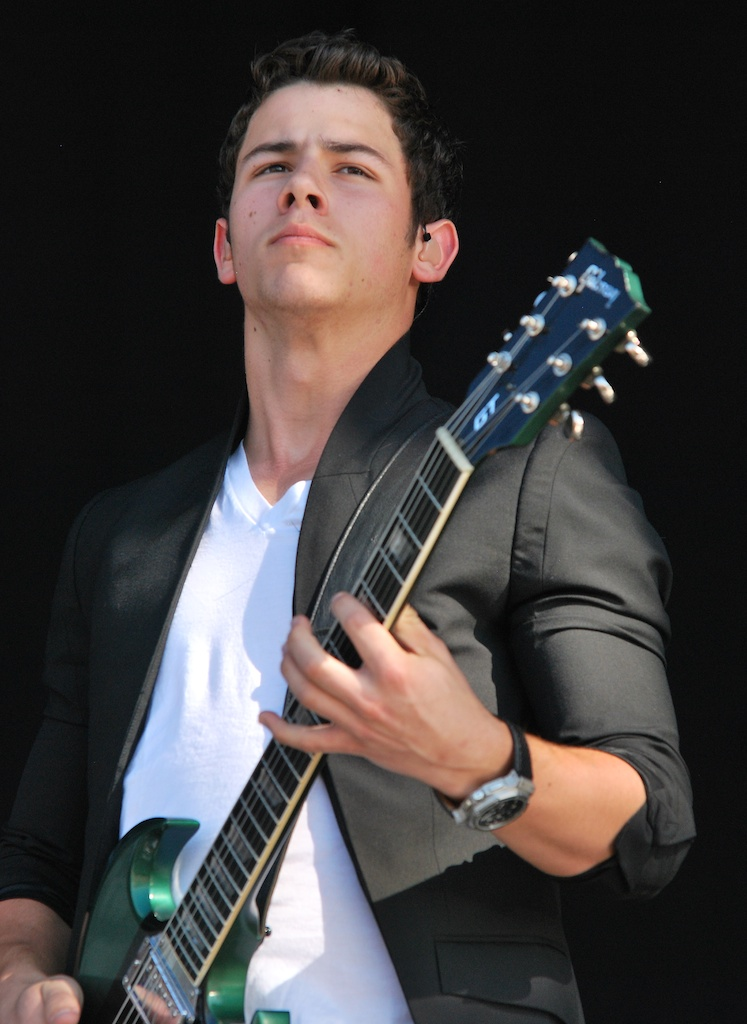
Nick Jonas

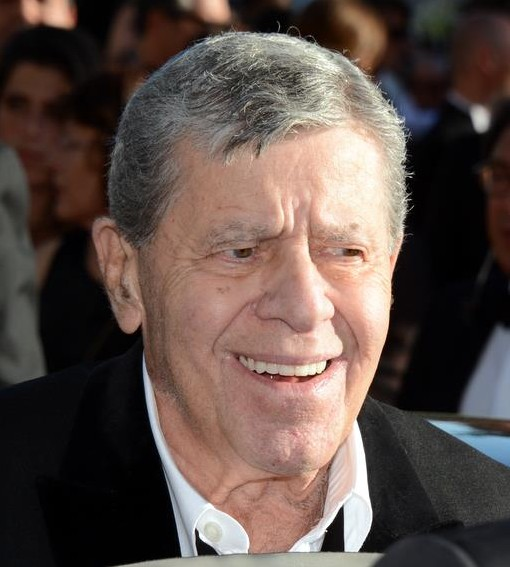
Jerry Lewis

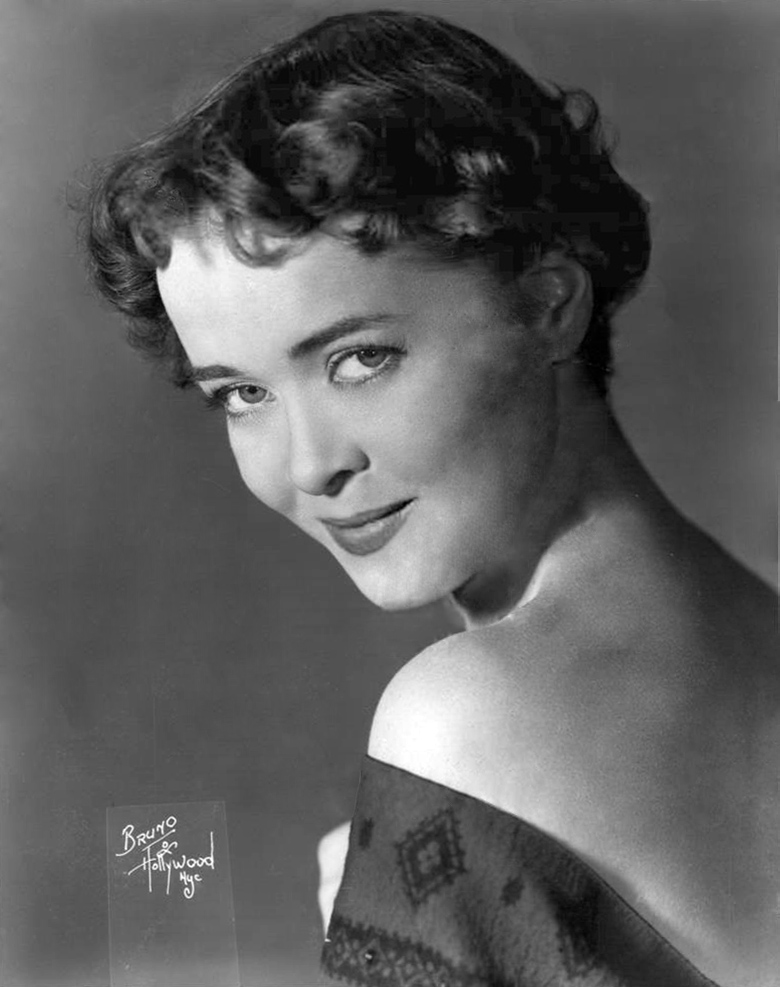
Joan McCracken

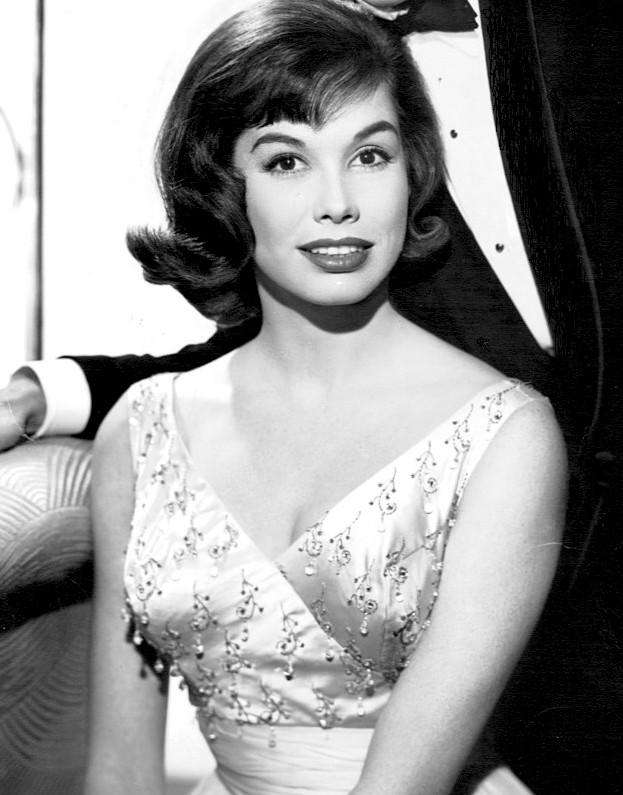
Mary Tyler Moore

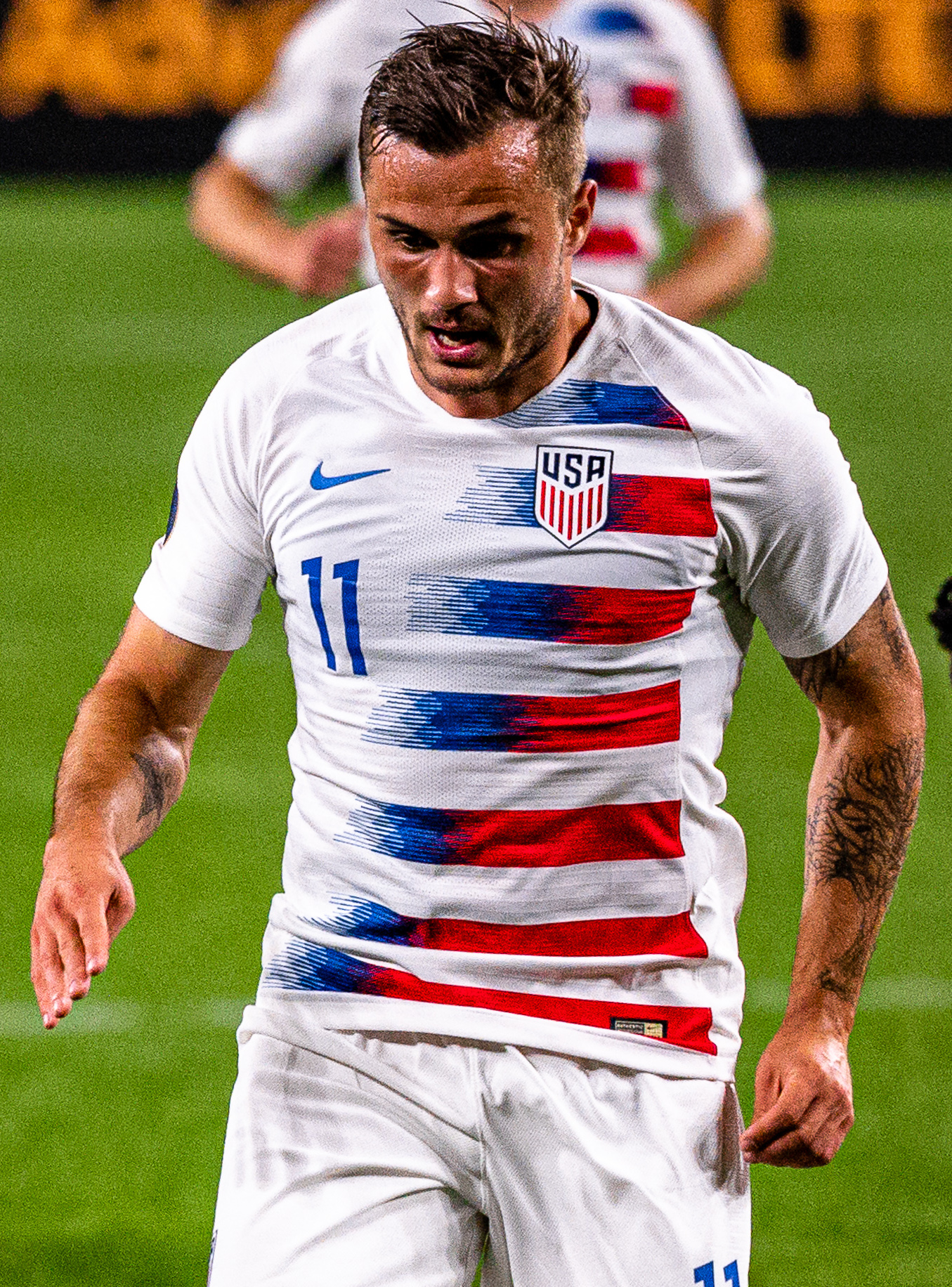
Jordan Morris

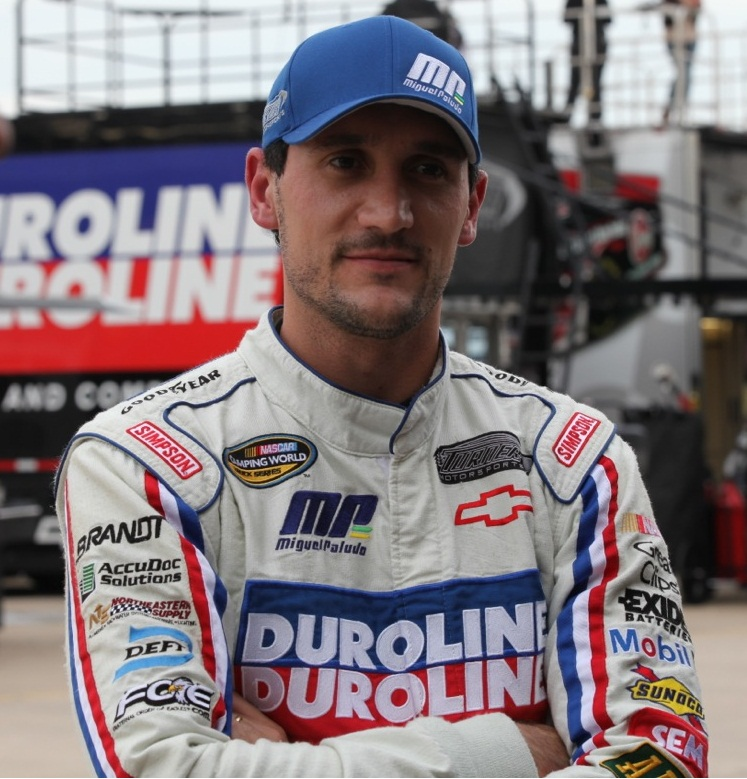
Miguel Paludo

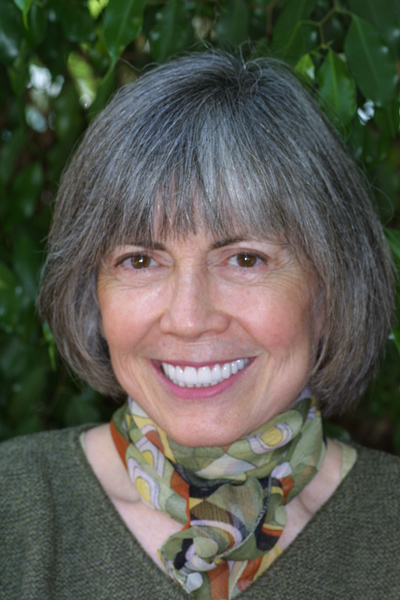
Anne Rice

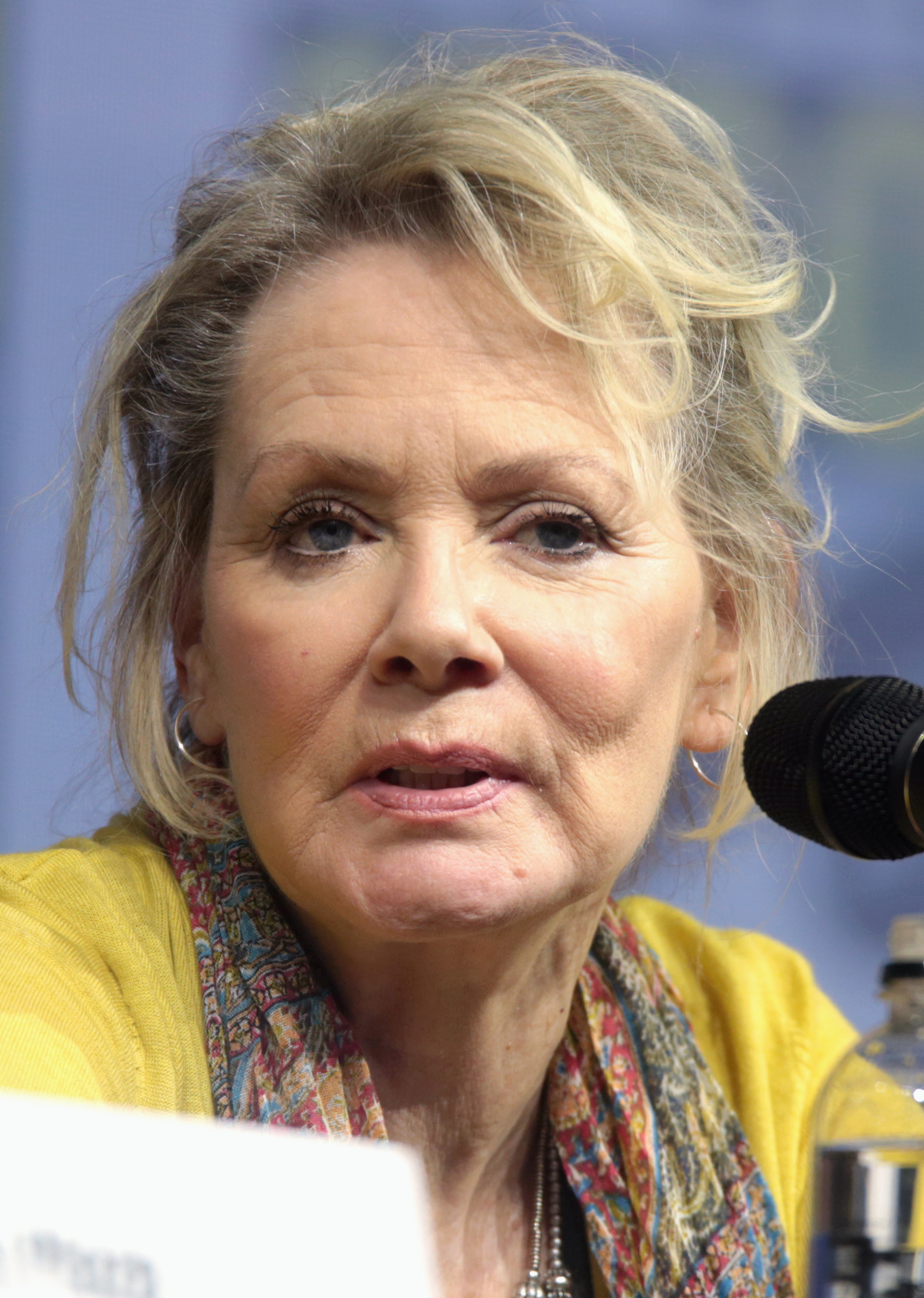
Jean Smart

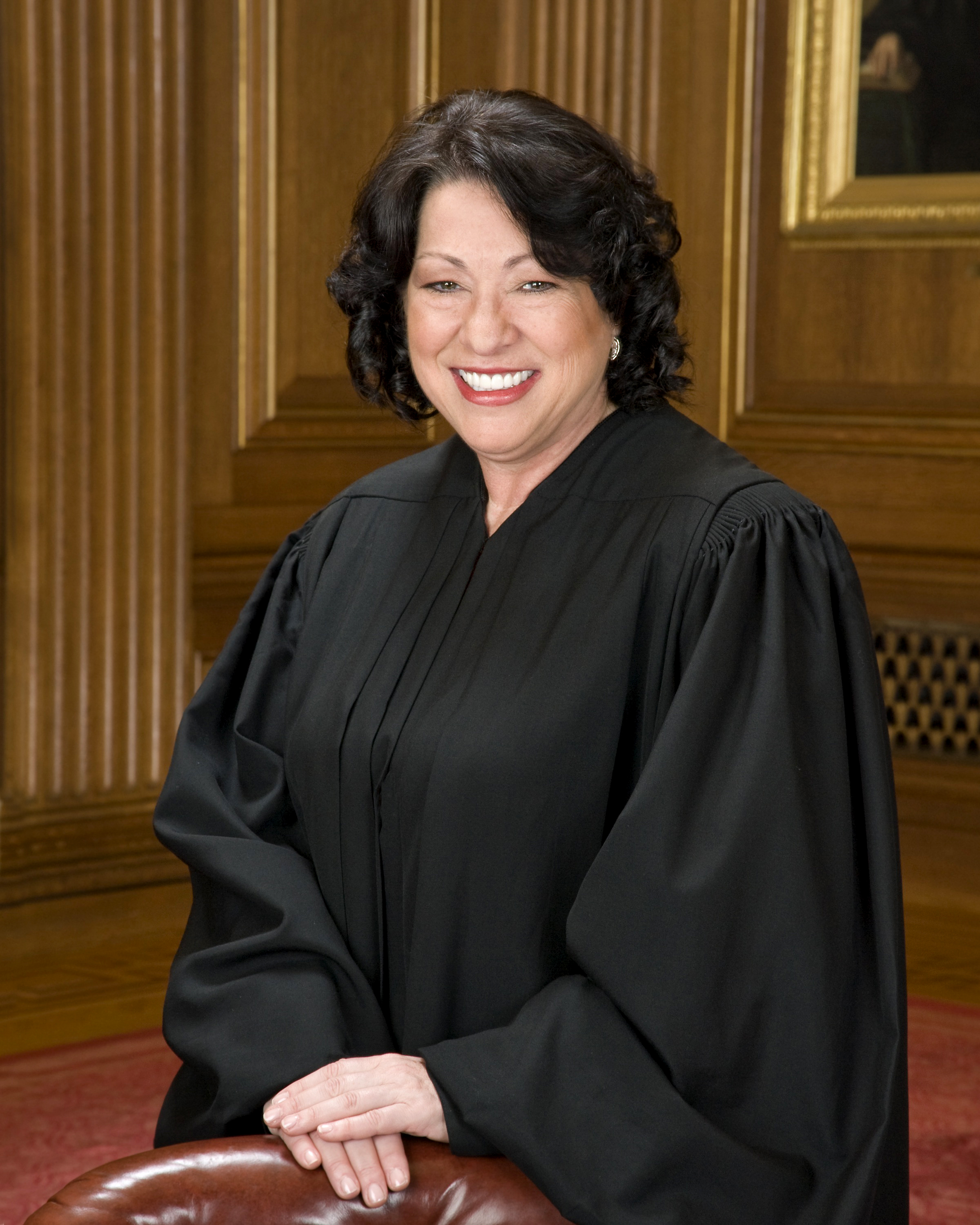
Sonia Sotomayor

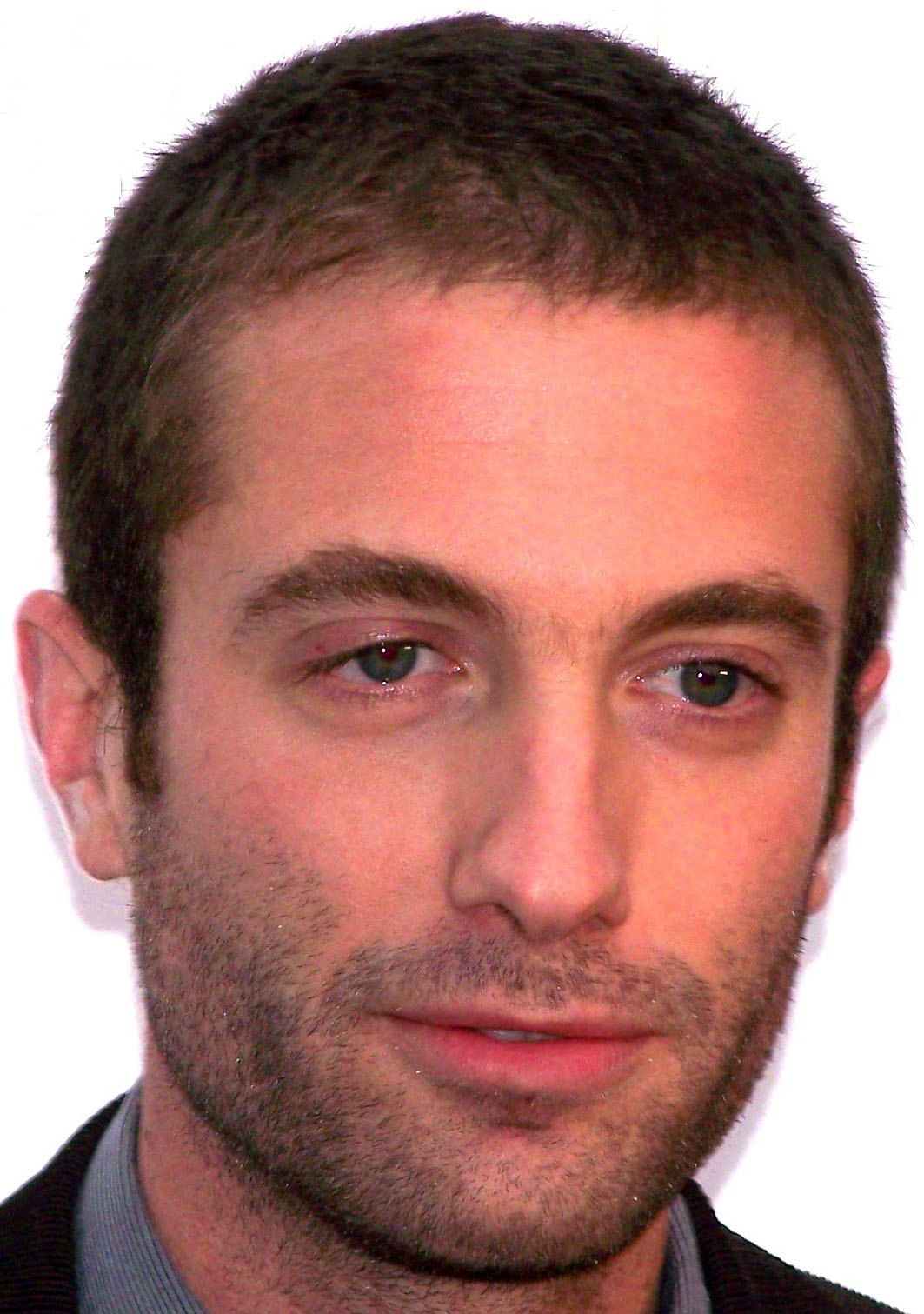
Jacob Tierney

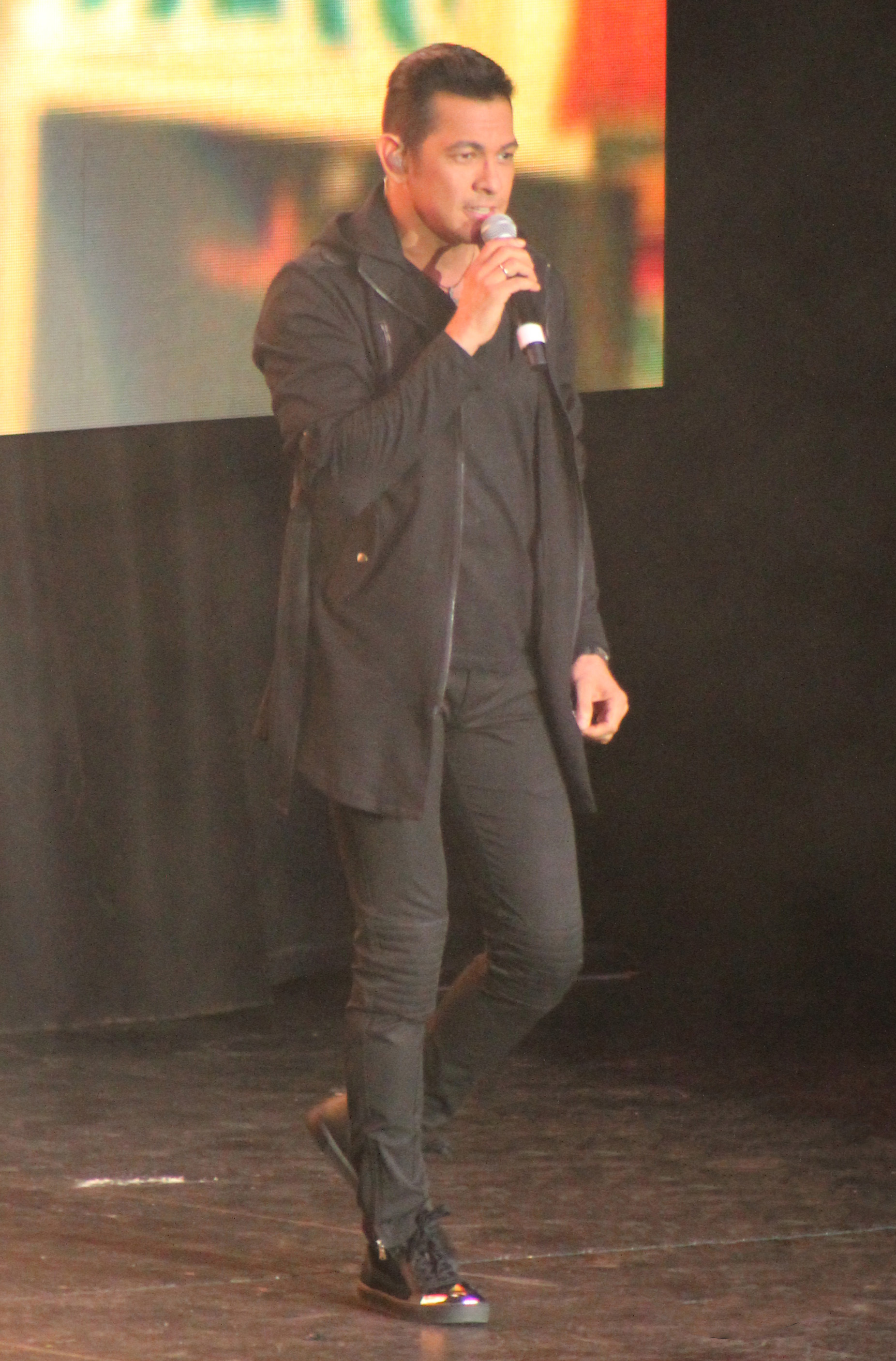
Gary Valenciano

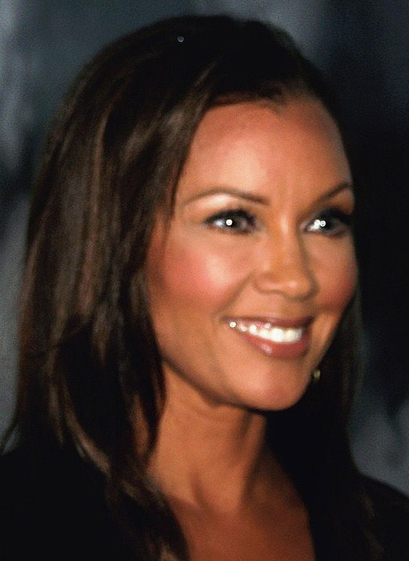
Vanessa Williams

Name	Lifespan	Nationality	Notability	Ref.
Alizée Agier	1994–	French	Karateka	
Wasim Akram	1966–	Pakistani	Cricketer, television personality	
Mona Alawi	2004–	Filipino	Actress, model	
Kurt Andersen	1954–	American	Writer, radio host	
Mark Andrews	1996–	American	American football tight end	
Rylee Arnold	2005–	American	Dancer	
Lance Bass	1979–	American	Singer	
Brec Bassinger	1999–	American	Actress	
Dexter Bean	1987–	American	Auto racing driver	
Jean-Marie Bigard	1954–	French	Actor	
Crystal Bowersox	1985–	American	Singer-songwriter, actress	
Nick Boynton	1979–	Canadian	Ice hockey defenceman	
Claudia Burton Bradley	1909–1957	Australian	Medical doctor, pharmacist	
Darren Brass	1972–	American	Tattoo artist	
Bertrand Burgalat	1963–	French	Musician and music producer	
George Canyon	1970–	Canadian	Country music singer	
Ana Carolina	1974–	Brazilian	Singer	
Carol Channing	1921–2019	American	Actress, comedian	
Stephen Clancy	1992–	Irish	Racing cyclist	
Don R. Christensen	1916–2006	American	Animator, illustrator	
Bobby Clarke	1949–	Canadian	Ice hockey centre, Hockey Hall of Fame member	
Ben Coker	1989–	British	Association football player	
Dennis Coles	1970–	American	Rapper, member of the Wu-Tang Clan	
Mark Collie	1956–	American	Singer-songwriter, musician	
Cory Conacher	1989–	Canadian	Ice hockey player	
Lauren Cox	1998–	American	Basketball player	
Elinor Crawley	1991–	Welsh	Actress	
B. J. Crombeen	1985–	Canadian	Ice hockey right winger	
Will Cross	1967–	American	Mountain climber	
Jay Cutler	1983–	American	American football quarterback	
Conor Daly	1991–	American	Professional race car driver	
Andrea Deck	1994–	American	Actress	
Adrian Dix	1964–	Canadian	Politician	
Max Domi	1995–	Canadian	Ice hockey player	
Charlotte Drury	1996–	American	Trampoline gymnast	
Buster Douglas	1960–	American	Professional boxer	
Chris Dudley	1965–	American	Basketball player and politician	
Adam Duvall	1988–	American	Major League Baseball outfielder	
Mike Echols	1978–	American	American football cornerback|	
Magnus Wolff Eikrem	1990–	Norwegian	Footballer	
Ron Elliott	1943–	American	Musician, lead guitarist of The Beau Brummels	
Blake Ferguson	1997–	American	American football long snapper for the National Football League (NFL)	
Carsten Fischer	1961–	German	Olympic field hockey player	
Kris Freeman	1980–	American	Cross-country skier	
Elliott Fry	1994–	American	American football placekicker	
Jimmy Fryzel	1981–	American	Arena Football League wide receiver	
Sam Fuld	1981–	American	Baseball outfielder	
Ed Gamble	1986–	British	Comedian, television personality	
Victor Garber	1949–	Canadian	Film, stage and television actor and singer	
Charles Ginsburg	1920–1992	American	Engineer, inventor	
Adam Goren	1975–	American	Musician	
Elizabeth Hughes Gossett	1907-1981	American	First American treated for diabetes with insulin therapy	
Devin K. Grayson	1970–	American	Writer of comic books and novels	
Dorian Gregory	1971–	American	Actor	
Sara Groenewegen	1995–	Canadian	Softball player	
Kamal Haasan	1954–	Indian	Actor	
Zuzana Haasová	1981–	Slovak	Actress	
Este Haim	1986–	American	Musician, bassist of Haim	
Gary Hall, Jr.	1974–	American	Competitive swimmer	
Kevin Hansen	1982–	American	Volleyball player	
Joonas Henttala	1991–	Finnish	Racing cyclist	
Dana Hill	1964–1996	American	Actress	
Dave Hollins	1966–	American	Major League Baseball third baseman	
Neil Hope	1972–2007	Canadian	Actor	
Lindsay Hoyle	1957–	British	Speaker of the House of Commons	
Catfish Hunter	1946–1999	American	Major League Baseball right-handed pitcher	
Dan Hurley	1957–	American	Author and journalist	
Natalie Irish	1982–	American	Visual artist	
Jeremy Irvine	1990–	British	Actor	
Chris Jarvis	1980–	Canadian	Rower	
Jason Johnson	1973–	American	Major League Baseball pitcher	
Nicole Johnson	1974–	American	Miss America winner	
Nick Jonas	1992–	American	Singer-songwriter, musician, and actor	
Rod Kafer	1971–	Australian	Rugby union player	
Kaapo Kakko	2001–	Finnish	Professional ice hockey player	
Sheku Kanneh-Mason	1999–	English	Cellist	
Alan Kernaghan	1967–	Irish	Footballer	
Fawad Khan	1981–	Pakistani	Actor, film producer	
Charlie Kimball	1985–	American	Auto racing driver	
Caitlin Kinnunen	1991–	American	Actress	
Kelli Kuehne	1977–	American	LPGA golfer	
Luke Kunin	1997–	American	Ice hockey center	
Robert D. Lawrence	1892–1968	British	Physician; founder of British Diabetic Association	
Jay Leeuwenburg	1969–	American	American football offensive lineman in the National Football League	
Gavin Lewis	2003–	American	Actor	
Jerry Lewis	1926–2017	American	Actor, comedian	
Amelia Lily	1994–	British	Pop singer	
Dominic Littlewood	1965–	British	Television journalist	
Mark Lowe	1983–	American	Major League Baseball relief pitcher	
Gary Mabbutt	1961–	British	English footballer	
Lewis Marnell	1982–2013	Australian	Skateboarder	
Theresa May	1956–	British	Former Prime Minister of the United Kingdom	
Joan McCracken	1917–1961	American	Dancer, actress	
Dustin McGowan	1982–	American	Major League Baseball pitcher	
Danny McGrain	1950–	Scottish	Association football player	
Craig McMillan	1976–	New Zealand	Cricketer	
Heather Meyer	1980–	American	Politician	
Bret Michaels	1963–	American	Musician, actor, reality television personality	
Mary Tyler Moore	1936–2017	American	Actress	
Jordan Morris	1994–	American	Major League Soccer player	
Adam Morrison	1984–	American	Basketball player	
Brandon Morrow	1984–	American	Major League Baseball pitcher	
Lila Moss	2002–	English	Model, daughter of Kate Moss	
Mary Mouser	1996–	American	Actress	
Nacho	1990–	Spanish	Footballer	
James Norton	1985–	British	Actor	
Peter O'Toole	1932–2013	British-Irish	Actor	
Gary Owens	1934–2015	American	Voice actor, radio personality	
Miguel Paludo	1983–	Brazilian	Auto racing driver	
Eric Paslay	1983–	American	Musician	
Dave Pember	1978–	American	Major League Baseball pitcher	
Elizabeth Perkins	1960–	American	Actress	
Toby Petersen	1978–	American	Ice hockey right winger	
Tucker Pillsbury	1997–	American	Musician, singer-songwriter, known professionally as Role Model	
Ryan Reed	1993–	American	Auto racing driver	
Charlotte Regan	1994–	British	Film director	
Sam Reid	1989–	Australian	Australian rules football player	
Anne Rice	1941–2021	American	Author	
Jonathan Rowson	1977–	Scottish	Chess Grandmaster	
Theodore Ryder	1916–1993	American	One of the first twelve diabetes patients in the world to be treated using insulin, at the age of five	
John Rutsey	1952–2008	Canadian	Drummer of Rush	
Sergi Samper	1995–	Spanish	Footballer	
Sierra Sandison	1993–	American	Beauty pageant titleholder	
Ron Santo	1940–2010	American	Major League Baseball third baseman	
Eva Saxl	1921–2002	Czech	Self-manufacturer of insulin	
Kim Schrier	1968–	American	Politician	
Kendall Simmons	1979–	American	National Football League guard	
Henry Slade	1993–	British	Rugby union player	
Jean Smart	1951–	American	Actress	
Sonia Sotomayor	1954–	American	Associate Justice of the Supreme Court of the United States	
Paul Sparks	1971–	American	Actor	
Matthias Steiner	1982–	German	Weightlifter, Olympic gold medalist	
Jennifer Stone	1993–	American	Actress	
Barney Storey	1977–	British	Cyclist	
Derek Theler	1986–	American	Actor	
Leonard Thompson	1908–1935	Canadian	First patient to receive insulin therapy	
Jacob Tierney	1979–	Canadian	Actor, filmmaker	
Riley Tufte	1998–	American	Ice hockey player	
Jim Turner	1952–	American	Actor, comedian	
Gary Valenciano	1964–	Filipino	Singer	
Fernando del Valle	1964–	American	Operatic tenor	
Scott Verplank	1964–	American	Professional golfer	
Dado Villa-Lobos	1965–	Brazilian	Musician, guitarist of Legião Urbana	
Tonette Walker	1955–	American	First Lady of Wisconsin	
Stephen Wallem	1968–	American	Actor	
Brandon Wardell	1992–	American	Stand-up comedian	
Washington	1975–	Brazilian	Footballer	
Brad Wilk	1968–	American	Musician	
Vanessa Williams	1963–	American	Actress	
Wade Wilson	1959–2019	American	American football quarterback	
Racheal Woodward	1994–	American	Singer, known professionally as RaeLynn	
Elliott Yamin	1978–	American	Singer	
Pär Zetterberg	1970–	Swedish	Footballer	
Alexander Zverev	1997–	German	Professional tennis player	

== See also ==
- Diabetes mellitus type 1
- List of sportspeople with diabetes
