= Professional Inline Hockey Association =

Inline hockey league in the United States

Professional Inline Hockey Association (PIHA)
- Current season, competition or edition: 2023-2024
- Sport: Inline hockey
- Founded: 2002, Middletown, Pennsylvania, United States
- Founder: Charles Yoder
- First season: 2002
- CEO: Denis Jelcic
- President: CJ Yoder
- No. of teams: 15
- Country: United States
- Continent: North America
- Most recent champion: Suffolk Sting (7)
- Most titles: Suffolk Sting (7)
- Related competitions: PIHA Pro Division; PIHA Semipro Division; PIHA Junior Divisions; PIHA Minor Division
- Website: ThePIHA.com

The Professional Inline Hockey Association (PIHA) is an "incorporated for-profit association" which operates an inline hockey league, with two conferences, of 11 franchised member clubs, all of which are currently located in the United States. Headquartered in Middletown, Pennsylvania, the PIHA is considered to be one of the premier inline hockey leagues in the United States. The Founders Cup Finals is held annually to crown the league playoff champion in the Pro and Minor divisions at the end of each season. PIHA also offers divisions for teens (Junior PIHA), & adults 35-and-over (Masters Division).

The league was founded in 2002, in Middletown, Pennsylvania, by Charles, CJ Yoder and Jami Yoder, who thought inline hockey could support a professional inline hockey league. It started with eight franchised member clubs and, through a series of expansions, contractions, and relocations, the league is now composed of 11 active franchises.

The PIHA draws many highly skilled players from mainly the United States, but draws players from other inline hockey countries. Although players are usually located in close proximity to their franchise locations, some players travel long distances to compete in the league.

== History ==
In 2001, after the creation of a series of struggling inline hockey leagues—Roller Hockey International, Pro Beach Hockey, and Major League Roller Hockey—a longtime inline hockey rink owner, Charley Yoder, and his sons CJ and Jami, had an idea of a professional league for about three years. After RHI started for its second time; and its chances didn't look good, Charles Yoder thought 'There's gotta be a way for it to work'. His sons, CJ and Jami, played in RHI, PBH and MLRH, and every league they played in had a list of things they did wrong so Charley and his sons put it down on paper. This led to the creation of the Professional Inline Hockey Association in 2002; the founding teams were the Cherry Hill Renegades, Delaware Blades (which became the Marple Grenades in 2003), Harrisburg Lunatics, Line Lexington Law Dawz, Mount Laurel Generation, Pottstown Machine, Reading Nasty Boyz, and York Typhoon.

The first season of PIHA was a successful one. The York Typhoon won the first Founders Cup defeating the Delaware Blades. After the 2002 season, PIHA went through its first series of expansions and contractions. The Pottstown (Mission) Machine, Line Lexington (Labeda) Law Dawgz, Mount Laurel (Nexed)Generation, and Cherry Hill (Tour) Renegades all contracted after their first season, while the Philadelphia Growl, South Jersey Beast and West Chester Shockwave (who became the Downingtown Rage) were the three expansion franchises bringing the league total to seven. The league's second series of expansion and reductions led to the Marple Gladiators and Philadelphia Beast contracting and expanding with the Bridgewater Extremes, Morristown Minutemen (later the New Jersey Minutemen and now the New Jersey Stampede), and the South JerseyTeam Breakaway, along with the first two franchises located outside of the Pennsylvania, New Jersey and Delaware tri-state area; the Buffalo Wings and the Frederick Vipers, both of which folded after competing in only seven games during the 2004 season bringing the league total back to eight by season's end. For the 2005 season, the league reached its lowest number of franchises at six. The Bridgewater Extremes, South Jersey Team Breakaway and Reading Nasty Boyz all contracting. The Nasty Boyz retracting left the Harrisburg Lunatics and York Typhoon as the only original two franchises. PIHA expanded with the PA West Inferno (now the Scottsdale Inferno). The Downingtown Rage contracted after the 2005 season.

The PIHA further expanded out of the tri-state area with 19 new franchises in two years. The Pittsburgh Phantoms (now the Pittsburgh Bandits), Richmond Rollin Robins, Aurora Crimson Catz (now the Fort Collins Catz), Colorado Springs Thunder, Littleton Fire, Pikes Peak Prowlers, and Westminster Blizzard entered in 2006; and a season later the Boston Roller Rats, Massachusetts Bombers, Connecticut Blaze, Hartford Fire Ants, New Jersey Grizzlies, Feasterville Fury, Marple Gladiators, Cincinnati Flying Monkeys, Midwest Tornados, River City Whalers, Southside Snipers, and St. Louis Pythons were all added bringing the total to 25 teams. Expansion continued in 2008 with the introduction of 18 more teams and the reduction of the Pottstown organization bringing the league total to 42 teams.

At the turn of the decade, PIHA saw a rebuilding stage as the American Inline Hockey League started to take shape. With the collapse of the Midwest Division, the league was initially divided into three divisions; with the Appalachian and Atlantic Divisions in the East, and the Rocky Mountain Division in the West. The Appalachian Division was disbanded in 2013, leaving the two division layout the league currently plays under.

On 28 February 2012, the PIHA co-founder Charley Yoder argued "it became the series the league hoped for" since Suffolk Sting and their rivals "played hard, physical hockey and were very well matched. Two overtimes and some of the best players in the country coming together to show off our sport was exactly what the league was looking for." Furthermore, the PIHA gave a relevant contribution to the growth of the National Roller Hockey League, together with the AIHL (American Inline Hockey League) and the MLRH (Major League Roller Hockey).

== Organizational structure ==
The PIHA Board of Directors is the ruling and governing body of the PIHA. The PIHA Board of Directors exists to establish the policies of the PIHA, and to uphold its by-laws. Some of the responsibilities of the PIHA Board of Directors include:

- review and approve any rule changes to the game
- hiring and firing of the PIHA commissioner
- review and approve any changes to the structure of the game schedule.

=== Board of directors ===
The chief executive of the PIHA is the Founder and CEO, Charles Yoder. Other principal decision makers who serve under the authority of the PIHA's CEO include:

- President: CJ Yoder
- Vice President: Jami Yoder
- Chief Financial Officer: Jim Vanhorn

== Game ==
Original PIHA logo, used before 2008.

Alternate PIHA logo, used before 2008.

Each Professional Inline Hockey Association regulation games is played between two teams. The game is 24 minutes long, and composed of two 12-minute periods with a halftime of two minutes. At the end of regulation time, the team with the most goals wins the game. If a game is tied after regulation time, overtime ensues. During the regular season, overtime is a Four-minute, three-player on three-player sudden-death period, in which the first team to score a goal wins the game. If no team is able to score in the first overtime period, there is a second overtime of a three-minute, two-player on two-player sudden-death period. Previous to the 2008–09 season, if a game was still tied at the end of the first two overtime periods, the game would enter a two-minute, one-player on one-player, sudden-death period.

Beginning in the 2008–09 season, if the game is still tied at the end of both overtime periods, the game enters a shootout. One player for each team in turn take a penalty shot. The team which scores, while the other team does not, wins the game. If the game is still tied after the first shootout round, the shootout continues in the same manner. Whichever team ultimately wins the shootout is awarded a goal in the game score and thus awarded two points in the standings. The losing team in overtime or shootout is awarded only one. Shootout goals and saves are not tracked in hockey statistics; shootout statistics are tracked separately.

Shootouts do not occur during the playoffs. In the playoffs, sudden-death four-on-four periods are played until one team scores. 12-minute periods in all divisions.

== Inline hockey rink ==
Professional Inline Hockey Association games are played on a rectangular inline hockey rink with rounded corners surrounded by walls and Plexiglas. It measures 80 by 180 feet (24 by 55 m). The minimum size is 65 by 165 feet (20 by 50 m). The center line divides the floor in half into attacking and defensive zones. Near the end of both ends of the rink, there is a thin red goal line spanning the width of the floor, which is used to judge goals.

== Rules ==
While the Professional Inline Hockey Association follows the general rules of inline hockey, it differs slightly from those used in international games organized by the IIHF-InLine (IIHF-InLine) such as the IIHF InLine Hockey World Championship. Infractions of the rules can lead to either the stoppage of play or a penalty call for more serious infractions.

A rule difference between the PIHA and the IIHF-InLine rules concerns illegal clearing calls. In the IIHF-InLine, a linesman stops play the moment the puck crosses the goal line for an illegal clearing violation. In the PIHA, there is no illegal clearing violation.

The PIHA and IIHF-InLine differ also in penalty rules. In the PIHA, minor penalties have a duration of one-half minutes, as opposed to two minutes in the IIHF-InLine. major penalties in the PIHA have a duration of four minutes, as opposed to five minutes in the IIHF-InLine.

Starting with the 2017-2018 season, The PIHA implemented a new rule where players in possession of the puck may not stop behind their own goal line. First infraction is a stoppage and faceoff at the closest faceoff location. Any infraction of this rule from then on will result in a one-half minute minor penalty.

== Season structure ==
The Professional Inline Hockey Association season is divided into an exhibition season, a regular season (from second weekend in September through first weekend in January) and a postseason (the Founders Cup Playoffs). During the exhibition season, teams may play other teams from the PIHA. They also may compete against clubs from other leagues. During the regular season, clubs play each other in a predefined schedule. The playoffs, which go from second week in January to the end of February, is an elimination tournament where two teams play against each other to win a playoff series in order to advance to the next round. The final remaining team is crowned the Founders Cup champion.

The PIHA's regular season standings are based on a point system instead of winning percentages. Points are awarded for each game, where two points are awarded for a win, one point for losing in overtime or a shootout, and zero points for a loss in regulation.

PIHA has had its share of experimentation with rule changes. In 2018-2019 the PIHA points standing will be as follows: Three Points for a regulation win, two points for an overtime/shootout win, one point for an overtime/shootout loss, 1/2 point for scoring the first goal of the game, 1/2 point for scoring the last goal of the first period, 1/2 point for scoring the first goal of the second period, and 1/2 point for scoring the last goal of the game. This calculates to an eligible 5 points per game. The next season, this reverted back to its current format of three points for a regulation win, two points for an overtime/shootout win, and one point for an overtime/shootout loss.

== Teams ==
The Professional Inline Hockey Association originated in 2002 with eight teams, and through a sequence of team expansions, reductions, and relocations currently consists of 10 teams, all of which are based in the United States. The Pennsylvania Typhoon are the most successful franchise with three Founders Cup championships. The next most successful active franchise is the Colorado Springs Thunder with two Founders Cup championships, and are currently two-time defending champions. The longest streak of winning the Founders Cup in consecutive years is three, held by the Pennsylvania Typhoon from 2002 to 2004; the Colorado Springs Thunder (2009–2010) and the now defunct Philadelphia Growl (2005–2006) have two-year championship streaks.

The current league organization divides the teams into two conferences: the Eastern Conference and the Western Conference. The current organization has roots in the 2012 season when a league realignment removed two divisions bringing total number of divisions to two.

In September 2025 the league announced that the Buffalo Wings, Hockey Plus Blue Heelers and Toronto 6ixers had joined the league as new teams.

== List of teams ==
Division	Team	City/Area	Arena	Founded	Joined	Head coach
Eastern Conference
Atlantic	Harrisburg Lunatics	Lemoyne, PA	Susquehanna Sports Center	2002		Todd Wiley
Atlantic	New Jersey Grizzlies	Wallington, NJ	International Sports Club of America	2006		Bob Fulton
Atlantic	Hershey Typhoon	Lemoyne, PA	Susquehanna Sports Center	2002		
Atlantic	Pottstown Team Blue	Pottstown, PA	The 422 Sportsplex	2008	2010	
Atlantic	Pittsburgh Inferno	Mount Pleasant, PA	Hot Shots Sports Arena	2005	2012†	Tim Davis
Atlantic	Suffolk Sting	Moriches, NY	Rapid Fire Arena	2008		Tim McManus
Atlantic	Marple Gladiators	Marple, PA	Marple Arena	2002	2013†	
Atlantic	East Coast Impact	Suffolk, NY	Rapid Fire Arena	2017		Phil Russo
Atlantic	Hatfield Scorchers	Hatfield, PA	309 Inline	2013		
Western Conference
Rocky Mountain	Colorado Springs Thunder	Colorado Springs, CO	Xfinity Roller Sports Arena	2006		Larry Holmes
Rocky Mountain	Fort Collins Catz	Fort Collins, CO	Qdoba Events Center	2006*		John Dahlgren
Rocky Mountain	Lakewood Fire	Lakewood, CO	Foothills Fieldhouse	2006*	2017†	Joseph Oria
Rocky Mountain	Parker Prowlers	Parker, CO	Parker Fieldhouse	2006*		John Bovee
Rocky Mountain	Iowa Leaf Ray	Des Moines, IA	Skate South	2012*	2017†	Spencer Coltrain
Rocky Mountain	Colorado Stallions	Colorado Springs, CO	Xfinity Roller Sports Arena	2013		
Rocky Mountain	Westminster Blizzard	Denver, CO	Xfinity Roller Sports Arena	2006	2014†	

Notes

1. (†) denotes a franchise left the league, then returned at a later date.
2. (*) denotes a franchise move. See the respective team articles for more information.
3. (**) Iowa Leaf Ray was formally Des Moines Xpress then reformed as Leaf Ray 7

== Trophies and awards ==
The Professional Inline Hockey Association presents a number of trophies each year. The most prestigious team award is the Founders Cup, which is awarded to the league champion at the end of the Founders Cup playoffs. The team that has the most points in the regular season is awarded the Best Overall Record Trophy. The Joe Cook Award is awarded to the league scoring champion (goals and assists) based on their statistics during the regular season. For the 2014–15 season the Joe Cook Award was awarded to Jake Miller of the Colorado Springs Thunder. Organization of the Year was awarded to the Lakewood Fire for the 2017–18 season. In addition to the regular season awards, the Walt Frazier Award is awarded annually to the most valuable player during the PIHA's Founders Cup playoffs.

Players, coaches, officials, and team builders who have had notable careers are eligible to be voted into the Professional Inline Hockey Association Hall of Fame.

== See also ==
- Roller Hockey International
