= Z Rink =

Indoor roller hockey facility in Glastonbury, Connecticut

Coordinates: 41.723°N 72.5829°W

- Interactive map of Z Rink
- Location: 259 Eastern Boulevard, Glastonbury, Connecticut 06033 USA

Tenants
- Connecticut Blaze (PIHA) (2007–2012); Hartford Fire Ants (AIHL) (2007–2012); Killingworth Guppies (2002-2012)

The Z Rink was an indoor roller hockey facility located in Glastonbury, Connecticut (a suburb of Hartford), in the United States. It was the home arena of the Killingworth Guppies, known as America’s Favorite NonProfessional Sports Franchise, for their numerous League Championships. It was also home of the Connecticut Blaze of the PIHA

The rink announced it would close at the end of November 2012, after the building was sold.
