= Mexico women's national inline hockey team =

Mexico women's national inline hockey team is the national inline hockey team for Mexico. The team competed in the 2013 Women's World Inline Hockey Championships. They beat the Iraqi women's national inline hockey team.
