= Elliott Fry =

American football player (born 1994)

No. 1, 3
- Position: Kicker

Personal information
- Born: December 12, 1994 (age 31); Frisco, Texas, U.S.
- Listed height: 6 ft 0 in (1.83 m)
- Listed weight: 170 lb (77 kg)

Career information
- High school: Prince of Peace Christian (Carrollton, Texas)
- College: South Carolina (2013-2016)
- NFL draft: 2017: undrafted

Career history
- Orlando Apollos (2019); Chicago Bears (2019)*; Baltimore Ravens (2019)*; Carolina Panthers (2020)*; Tampa Bay Buccaneers (2020)*; Atlanta Falcons (2020–2021); Kansas City Chiefs (2021); Green Bay Packers (2021)*; Cincinnati Bengals (2021); Jacksonville Jaguars (2022)*; Arizona Cardinals (2023)*; Denver Broncos (2023)*
- * Offseason or practice squad member only

Awards and highlights
- Second-team All-SEC (2014)

Career NFL statistics
- Field goals: 5
- Field goal attempts: 6
- Field goal %: 83.3
- Longest field goal: 44
- Stats at Pro Football Reference

Elliott Goering Fry (born December 12, 1994) is an American former professional football player who was a kicker. He played college football at South Carolina. He has been a member of the Orlando Apollos of the Alliance of American Football (AAF), and eleven National Football League (NFL) teams. He was signed as an undrafted free agent by the Chicago Bears in 2019, before playing his first game with the Atlanta Falcons in 2020.

== Early life ==
Fry attended Prince of Peace Christian School in Carrollton, Texas. While Elliott Fry was playing hockey at the age of seven, he lost consciousness on the ice due to extremely high blood glucose levels. Fry was diagnosed with Type 1 diabetes. Fry was an avid soccer and football player in high school. He was the kicker and punter, but also played a little bit of offense due to his speed.

== College career ==
Fry attended the University of South Carolina where became the all-time leading scorer for the Gamecocks.

== Professional career ==
Pre-draft measurables
| Height | Weight | Arm length | Hand span |
|---|---|---|---|
| 5 ft 11 7/8 in (1.83 m) | 172 lb (78 kg) | 29 1/2 in (0.75 m) | 8 1/4 in (0.21 m) |
All values from Pro Day

=== Orlando Apollos ===
Fry went 14–14 in his 8 weeks with the Orlando Apollos before the Alliance of American Football suspended operations.

=== Chicago Bears ===
Fry was signed by the Chicago Bears on April 12, 2019 to a three-year deal shortly after the departure of Cody Parkey as part of the Bears' preseason kicking competition. During the preseason, he competed with Eddy Piñeiro, but was waived by the Bears shortly after their Week 2 loss to the New York Giants. He made three of four field goals for the Bears.

=== Baltimore Ravens ===
Shortly after being waived by the Bears, signed a contract with the Baltimore Ravens. He was cut by the Ravens after their final preseason game against the Washington Redskins.

In October 2019, Fry was selected by the St. Louis BattleHawks in the open phase of the 2020 XFL draft, but did not sign with the team.

=== Carolina Panthers ===
Fry signed a reserve/futures contract with the Carolina Panthers on December 30, 2019. He was waived on April 30, 2020.

=== Tampa Bay Buccaneers ===
On May 1, 2020, Fry was claimed off waivers by the Tampa Bay Buccaneers. He was waived on September 1.

=== Atlanta Falcons ===
On October 1, 2020, Fry was signed to the Atlanta Falcons practice squad. He was elevated to the active roster on October 5 for the team's week 4 game against the Green Bay Packers. He made his NFL debut in the game, converting one field goal and going one-for-two on extra point attempts. He reverted to the practice squad the next day. He signed a reserve/future contract on January 4, 2021. On May 12, Fry was waived by the Falcons.

On September 10, 2021, Fry was signed to the Falcons' practice squad. He was released from their practice squad on September 20. On October 5, Fry once again was signed to the Falcons' practice squad. He was released on November 17.

=== Kansas City Chiefs ===
Fry was signed to the Kansas City Chiefs' practice squad on December 14, 2021. He was signed to the active roster on December 20. After playing only one game for the team, he was released on December 28.

=== Green Bay Packers ===
On January 1, 2022, Fry was signed to the Green Bay Packers practice squad, but was released two days later.

=== Cincinnati Bengals ===
On January 4, 2022, Fry was signed to the Cincinnati Bengals practice squad. He was elevated to the Bengals' active roster on January 10, using a standard elevation. He reverted back to the practice squad after the game, and was released on January 31.

=== Jacksonville Jaguars ===
On July 29, 2022, Fry signed with the Jacksonville Jaguars. He was waived/injured on August 15 and placed on injured reserve. Fry was released on August 19.

=== Arizona Cardinals ===
On January 11, 2023, Fry signed a reserve/future contract with the Arizona Cardinals. He was released on May 15.

=== Denver Broncos ===
On May 31, 2023, Fry signed a one-year deal with the Denver Broncos after they released longtime kicker Brandon McManus. He was waived/injured on August 15.

== Personal life ==
Fry has Type 1 diabetes, which he was diagnosed with when he was seven years old.

== See also ==
- List of people with type 1 diabetes
