= Confederação Brasileira de Hóquei no Gelo =

Brazilian Confederation of In Line Hockey (Portuguese: Confederação Brasileira de Hóquei in Line) is the Brazilian national Inline hockey federation. It controls the Brazilian national inline hockey team.
