= List of sportspeople with diabetes =

Improvements in the management of diabetes mellitus in the twentieth century have made it possible for athletes with diabetes to compete in sport at a professional level. While it is rare for professional athletes to have type 2 diabetes, a number of notable athletes have type 1.

Literature on the management of diabetes in competitive sports focuses on the difficulties with balancing energy and insulin intake during periods of strenuous exercise.

The following is a list of notable sportspeople who have had diabetes during their careers. It does not include athletes diagnosed after retirement.

== American football ==
- Jay Cutler, Denver Broncos (2006–2008) and Chicago Bears (2009–2016) quarterback, type 1.
- Mike Echols, Tennessee Titans (2002–2004) cornerback, type 1.
- Kendall Simmons, Pittsburgh Steelers (2002–2008) guard, type 1.
- Jake Byrne, San Diego Chargers, tight end, type 1
- John Chick, Saskatchewan Roughriders (2007–2009, 2013–2015), Indianapolis Colts (2010–11), Jacksonville Jaguars (2011–2012), Hamilton Tiger-Cats (2016–2017), Edmonton Eskimos (2017); defensive end, type 1
- Patrick Peterson, Arizona Cardinals (2011–2020), Minnesota Vikings (2021-2022) and Pittsburgh Steelers (2023); cornerback, type 2
- Mark Andrews, Baltimore Ravens (2018–), tight end, type 1
- Noah Gray, Kansas City Chiefs (2021–), tight end, type 1
- Chad Muma, Jacksonville Jaguars (2022–2024), Indianapolis Colts (2025), New England Patriots (2025–) linebacker, type 1.
- Blake Ferguson, Miami Dolphin (2020–2024), long snapper, type 1.
- Adonai Mitchell, Indianapolis Colts (2024–2025), New York Jets (2025–) wide receiver, type 1.
- Brayden Narveson, Green Bay Packers (2024), Tennessee Titans (2024), placekicker, type 1.
- DeAndre Carter, Philadelphia Eagles (2018), Houston Texans (2018–2020), Chicago Bears (2020, 2024), Washington football team (2021), Los Angeles Chargers (2022), Las Vegas Raiders (2023), Cleveland Browns (2025), wide receiver, type 1.

== Australian football ==
- Nathan Bassett, Adelaide, type 1.
- Jamie Cripps, St Kilda and West Coast, type 1.
- Jack Fitzpatrick, Melbourne, Hawthorn type 1.
- Brandon Jack, Sydney, type 1.
- Paddy McCartin, St Kilda, Sydney, type 1.
- Sam Reid, Western Bulldogs and Greater Western Sydney, type 1.
- Dale Weightman, Richmond, type 1.

== Baseball ==
- Ron Santo, Chicago Cubs (1960–1973) and Chicago White Sox (1974) infielder, type 1, deceased (2010 at age 70).
- Sam Fuld, Chicago Cubs (2007–2010), Tampa Bay Rays (2011–2013), and Oakland Athletics (2014–2015) outfielder, later General Manager of the Philadelphia Phillies, type 1.
- Mark Lowe, Seattle Mariners (2006–2010, 2015), Texas Rangers (2010–2012), Los Angeles Angels of Anaheim (2013), Cleveland Indians (2014), Toronto Blue Jays (2015), and Detroit Tigers (2016) pitcher, type 1.
- Brandon Morrow, Seattle Mariners (2007–2009) and Toronto Blue Jays (2010–2014) pitcher, type 1.
- Dustin McGowan, Toronto Blue Jays (2005–2008, 2011, 2013–2014), Philadelphia Phillies (2015), and Miami Marlins (2016–) pitcher, type 1.
- Jackie Robinson, Brooklyn Dodgers (1947–1956), type 2, deceased (1972 at age 53).
- Bill Gullickson, Montreal Expos (1979–1994), type 1
- Adam Duvall, San Francisco Giants (2014), Cincinnati Reds (2015–2018), Atlanta Braves (2018–2020), Miami Marlins (2021), Atlanta Braves (2021–2022), Boston Red Sox (2023), Atlanta Braves (2024–present), 2016 all star, type 1
- Garrett Mitchell, Milwaukee Brewers (2020-), type 1
- James "Catfish" Hunter, Kansas City/Oakland Athletics (1965-1974) and New York Yankees (1975-1979) pitcher, type 1, deceased (1999 at age 53 of ALS)
- Dave Hollins, multiple teams (1990–2002), 1993 all-star, type 1
- Mason Miller, Oakland Athletics (2023-2025) and San Diego Padres (2025-present), type 1
- Jordan Hicks, St. Louis Cardinals (2018-2023), Toronto Blue Jays (2023), San Francisco Giants (2024-2025), Boston Red Sox (2025), Chicago White Sox (2026-Present), type 1

== Basketball ==
- Lauren Cox, WNBA power forward (2020–present), type 1.
- Chris Dudley, National Basketball Association center (1988–2001), politician, type 1.
- Gary Forbes, National Basketball Association small forward (2010–present), type 1.
- Adam Morrison, National Basketball Association small forward (2006–2010), type 1.
- Alper Saruhan, Turkish Basketball Super League small forward (2007–present), type 1.

== Cricket ==
- Wasim Akram, Pakistani bowler (104 Tests, 356 ODIs, 1984–2003), type 1.
- Craig Cumming, New Zealand batsman (11 Tests, 2005–2008), type 1.
- Sophie Devine, New Zealand all-rounder (159 ODIs, active), type 1.
- Jess Kerr, New Zealand bowler (54 ODI's active), type 1.
- Hayley Matthews, West Indian all-rounder (105 ODI's, active), type 1.
- John McLaren, Australian batsman (1 Test, 1912), died of diabetes aged 34.
- Craig McMillan, New Zealand batsman (55 Tests, 1997–2005), type 1.
- Dirk Wellham, Australian batsman (6 Tests, 1981–1987), type 1.

== Cycling ==
- Mandy Marquardt (United States)
- Mateusz Rudyk (Poland)
- Javier Mejías (Spain),
- Andrea Peron (Italy)
- Martijn Verschoor (Netherlands)
- Team Novo Nordisk (International)

== Field Hockey ==
- Adam Imer, Brazil, type 1
- Tegan Fourie, South Africa, type 1
- Timur Oruz, Germany, type 1
- Tim Atkins, Scotland, type 1

== Football ==
- Scott Allan, Celtic midfielder, type 1
- Nanna Christiansen, Denmark women's national football team (2009–2021) midfielder, Type 1.
- Ben Coker, Southend (2013– ) defender, type 1.
- Antonia Göransson, Sweden women's national football team (2010–2015) midfielder, type 1.
- Jack Iredale, Hibernian (2024–) defender, type 1.
- Goran Jurić, Croatia national football team (1997–1999) defender, type 1.
- Alan Kernaghan, Republic of Ireland national football team (1992–1996) defender, type 1.
- Gary Mabbutt, Tottenham (1982–1998) and Bristol Rovers (1979–1982) defender, UEFA Cup and FA Cup winner, type 1.
- Borja Mayoral, Spain (2019–), Real Madrid (2015-2016) and Getafe CF (2015–), striker, type 1.
- Danny McGrain, Scotland (62 caps, 1973–1982) and Celtic (1967–1987) defender, seven-time Scottish Premier League winner.
- Jordan Morris, United States (24 caps, 2014–) and Seattle Sounders FC (2012–2013, 2016–) and Stanford University (2013–2015) Forward, type 1.
- Jack Muldoon, Lincoln City (2015–2017), forward, type 1.
- Nacho, Spain (2013–) and Real Madrid (2009) defender.
- Andy Penman, Scotland (1 cap, 1966) and Rangers (1967–1973), Dundee F.C. (1959–1967) and Arbroath F.C. (1973–1978) midfielder, Scottish Football League winner 1961. type 1, deceased (1994 at aged 51).
- Sergi Samper, Vissel Kobe (2019–) and Barcelona La Masia graduate, midfielder, type 1.
- Craig Stanley, Lincoln City (2015–2017), midfielder, type 1.
- Magnus Wolff Eikrem, Norwegian professional footballer, playing for Molde Fotballklubb as their club captain, type 1
- Pär Zetterberg, Sweden men's national football team, midfielder, type 1.
- Andy Rose, Vancouver Whitecaps FC (2019–present), midfielder, Type 1.
- João Valido, goalkeeper, type 1.

== Gaelic Football ==
- Kevin Nolan, Dublin GAA (2008–2015), half back, Type 1.

== Golf ==
- Ally Ewing, three-time LPGA Tour winner, type 1.
- Michelle McGann, seven-time LPGA Tour winner, type 1.
- J. J. Spaun, one-time PGA Tour winner, type 1.
- Scott Verplank, five-time PGA Tour winner, type 1.

== Gymnastics ==
- Charlotte Drury, American trampoline gymnast, 2020 Olympic alternate, type 1.

== Ice hockey ==
- Nick Boynton, former National Hockey League defenseman, type 1.
- Bobby Clarke OC, Philadelphia Flyers (1969–84) and Canada center, sports administrator, type 1.
- Cory Conacher, National Hockey League center (2011–present), type 1.
- B. J. Crombeen, National Hockey League winger (2007–2015), type 1.
- Max Domi, National Hockey League winger (2015–present), type 1.
- Anissa Gamble, Canadian Women's Hockey League, Toronto Furies (2018–19), winger, (2003–present), type 1.
- Toby Petersen, former National Hockey League center (2000–2014), type 1.
- Luke Kunin, National Hockey League center (2017–present), type 1.
- Kaapo Kakko, Seattle Kraken, type 1.

== Track & field ==
- Kaila Jackson, University of Georgia 60 Meter 100 Meter and 200 Meter, type 1, First Team All American (Junior)
- Lachlan Kennedy, Australian Sprinter, diagnosed at age 15, in 2018.

== Motor racing ==
- Conor Daly, IndyCar driver, type 1.
- Jamie Dick, NASCAR driver, type 2.
- Charlie Kimball, IndyCar driver, type 1.
- Ryan Reed, NASCAR driver, type 1.
- Miguel Paludo, Brazil. NASCAR driver, type 1.
- Jack Perkins, Supercars driver Australia, type 1.
- Christian Mansell, Australian 2025–26 24H Series Middle East driver, type 1.

== Pickleball ==
- Lea Jansen, US, Pickleball player, type 1.

== Rowing ==
- Michal Jelinski, Poland, Olympic gold medal winner 2008, four-time World Champion (2005–2009) quadruple sculls, type 1
- Chris Jarvis, Canada, Olympic rower 2004, 2008, pan-am games champion (2007) Men's pair, type 1
- Sir Steve Redgrave, UK, 5 Olympic gold medals, 9 World championship golds, 3 Commonwealth golds type 2

== Rugby league ==
- Steve Renouf, Brisbane (1988–1999), Queensland and Australia centre, type 1.
- Brett Stewart, Manly (2003–), New South Wales and Australia fullback, type 1.
- Lance Thompson, St George Dragons (1995–2005), Cronulla-Sutherland Sharks (2006–2008)

== Rugby union ==
- Rod Kafer, Australian Test player (12 caps, 1999–2000), type 1.
- Henry Slade, Exeter Chiefs, type 1
- Chris Pennell, Worcester Warriors and England, Type 1

== Running ==
- Billy Mills, American long-distance runner, 1964 Olympic gold medalist, type 2.

== Softball ==
- Sara Groenewegen, Canadian Pitcher, type 1

== Swimming ==
- Gary Hall, Jr., American freestyler, five-time Olympic gold medallist (1996, 2000, 2004), type 1.

== Tennis ==
- Arthur Ashe, American winner of 3 Grand Slam Titles (1968 US Open, 1970 Australian Open, 1975 Wimbledon), type 2.
- Billie Jean King, United States of America, winner of 20 Wimbledon titles, 3 U.S. Open titles, one Australian Open title, four French Open titles, and 695 career singles victories, type 2.
- Alexander Zverev, Germany, World #1 (2026), Olympic Gold Medalist, one French Open title, one US Open title, Type 1.

== Winter sports ==
- Kris Freeman, American cross-country skier, type 1.

== Wrestling ==
- Jorge González (wrestler), Argentinian basketball player and professional wrestler, deceased (2010 at age 44 from complications of diabetes and gigantism).
- Takashi Ishikawa, Japanese sumo and professional wrestler.
- Kyle O'Reilly, Canadian professional wrestler, type 1.
- Tojo Yamamoto, American professional wrestler, deceased (1992 at age 65 due to suicide)
- Yoshiaki Yatsu, Japanese amateur wrestler, professional wrestler and mixed martial artist.
