= Rapid Fire Arena =

Skating facility in Moriches, New York

- Interactive map of Rapid Fire Arena
- Location: 225 Montauk Hwy, Moriches, NY 11955
- Coordinates: 40.8092°N 72.8239°W
- Operator: Rapid Fire Arena
- Surface: Hardwood

Tenant
- Suffolk Sting

The Rapid Fire Arena is a skating facility located in Moriches, New York. It is the home of the professional inline hockey team, the Suffolk Sting of the Professional Inline Hockey Association Pro Division (PIHA Pro) and the Professional Inline Hockey Association Minor League (PIHAML).
