= National Roller Hockey League =

Sports league

- Most recent season or competition: 2016
- Sport: Inline hockey
- Founded: November 2014
- First season: 2015
- CEO: Matt Wiedenhoeft
- Commissioner: Bob Clouston
- No. of teams: 4
- Country: United States
- Headquarters: Detroit, Michigan
- Continent: North America
- Most recent champion: Detroit Bordercats (2016)
- Most titles: Detroit Bordercats (2)
- Website: Official website

The National Roller Hockey League (NRHL) was an inline hockey league in the United States. The league was established in 2014, and played two seasons from 2015 to 2016 before going on hiatus for three years, and then announcing a return in 2020 with four teams. However, due to the COVID-19 pandemic, the plans for return were halted and the league hasn't returned to play ever since. The league has not announced anything since 2020 and as of today has continued to be on hiatus.

== History ==
=== First seasons (2015–2016) ===
Founded in late 2014, the NRHL began its inaugural season on February 20, 2015. Four teams (Alkali Revive, Alkali Surge, Canfield Chiefs, and Detroit Bordercats) played a 12-game regular season followed by playoffs. Following an undefeated regular season, the Detroit Bordercats needed three games to eliminate Alkali Revive to advance to the Commissioners Cup Finals where they swept the best-of three series against Alkali Surge. Kyle Siciliano was named playoffs MVP.

NRHL switched to a winter schedule for its second season, which begin on December 18, 2015. Returning to defend their title was the Detroit Bordercats along with a rebranded Motor City Revive and Shelby Surge. The Canfield Chiefs franchise was replaced by the Detroit Stars. The Bordercats would continue their regular season undefeated streak until February 13, 2016, when the Stars handed them their first loss. On April 10, 2016, the Bordercats would exact some revenge, sweeping the Stars in two-straight games to capture their second NRHL Commissioners Cup.

After two seasons NRHL went dormant as the administration developed a strategic plan to move forward as a national league.

=== Planned return to play (2020) ===
There were plans to return in 2020 with a summer season running from May through August.

With a national league in mind, the St. Louis Vipers were announced as an expansion franchise in August 2018. Port Huron was the next city announced by NRHL. The Detroit Dragons and Grand Rapids Warthogs have also been announced. However, there have been no league announcements ever since, making it uncertain whether the league will return to play.

== Teams ==
NRHL teams
Team	City	Home arena	1st season
Detroit Dragons	Fraser, MI	Fraser Hockeyland	2020
Grand Rapids Warthogs	Grand Rapids, MI	DeltaPlex Arena	2020
Port Huron Yeti	Port Huron, MI	McMorran Place	2020
St. Louis Vipers	St. Charles, MO	Family Arena	2020

=== Past teams ===
- Canfield Chiefs (2015)
- Detroit Bordercats (2015–16)
- Detroit Stars (2016)
- Motor City Revive (2015–16)
- Shelby Surge (2015–16)

== Champions ==
NRHL Commissioners Cup
Season	Champion	Runner up	Results	Playoff MVP
2015	Detroit Bordercats	Alkali Surge	7-3; 9-6	Ryan Perry, Bordercats
2016	Detroit Bordercats	Detroit Stars	7-4; 9-4	Ryan Kish, Bordercats

== Awards ==
NRHL Awards
Season	Player of the Year	Top Forward	Top Defensemen	Top Goaltender
2015	Ryan Perry, Bordercats	Ryan Perry, Bordercats	Eric Purcell, Chiefs	Matt Koleski, Bordercats
2016	Ryan Perry, Bordercats	Ryan Perry, Bordercats	Corey Hodge, Stars	Jason Stross, Bordercats
