= Inline Hockey World Championships =

Inline Hockey World Championships may refer to:

- World Skate Inline Hockey World Championships
- IIHF Inline Hockey World Championship
