= Eva Saxl =

Manufacturer of insulin

Eva Saxl (1921–2002) was a self-taught manufacturer of insulin and an advocate for people with Type 1 diabetes. Saxl was born in Prague, Czechoslovakia.

== Insulin production ==
In 1940, during World War II, she and her husband, Victor Saxl, fled to Shanghai, China. In Shanghai, a year later, Saxl was diagnosed with Type 1 diabetes. When the Japanese attacked Pearl Harbor in 1941 the Japanese occupation of China was tightened, and soon all the pharmacies in Shanghai were closed. Saxl had no legal access to insulin. It was possible to buy insulin on the black market using one-ounce gold bars for payment. But that was not the safest option; one of Eva's friends died from using the black market insulin.

Eventually, Victor and Eva decided to get insulin another—highly unconventional—way: make it themselves. The book "Beckman's Internal Medicine" (Note: Probably von Bergmann, Gustav, ed. (1924–1930). Handbuch der inneren Medizin. Berlin: Springer. OCLC 493905698.) described the methods that Frederick Banting and Charles Best first used to extract insulin from the pancreases of dogs, calves, and cows in 1921.

A Chinese chemist lent them a small laboratory in the basement of a municipal building, where they attempted to extract insulin from pancreata of water buffaloes. After much work, they finally produced a brown-coloured insulin. The insulin was tested on rabbits starved for twenty-four hours and then divided into two groups. One group was injected with the extracted mix, and the other with Eva's insulin. Without equipment to test the rabbits’ urine or blood, the best way Victor could test the potency of the insulin was to see if the rabbits experienced the same hypoglycaemic shock as the other rabbits. After testing the insulin on rabbits for more than a year, Eva was running out of conventional insulin and cautiously tried it on herself-–and it worked.

In the Jewish ghetto where they were living, many other people with type 1 diabetes were also in dire need of insulin. Eva gave her insulin to two boys in a nearby hospital who were in diabetic comas.

With a successful batch of homemade insulin, the Saxls began production of insulin for all people with Type 1 diabetes in the Shanghai Ghetto. In all, over 200 people survived between 1941 and 1945 and there were no fatalities reported as a result of tainted insulin.

The Saxls left Shanghai after World War II and emigrated to the United States. Eva and Elliott P. Joslin, MD, founder of today's Joslin Diabetes Center in Boston, Massachusetts, befriended each other, and soon Dr. Joslin began inviting Eva to give lectures to groups of children and diabetes organizations. She became the first vocal spokesperson for Type 1 diabetes. Her husband worked for the United Nations.

== After WWII ==
In 1968, Victor Saxl died and Eva moved to Santiago, Chile, to live with her brother, her only living relative. There she would remain vigilant as an advocate for people with Type 1 diabetes. Eva Saxl died in 2002 in Santiago.

The Saxls' story was dramatized by the 1956–1958 CBS television show Telephone Time in an episode titled "Time Bomb".
