= Inline hockey =

Sport discipline

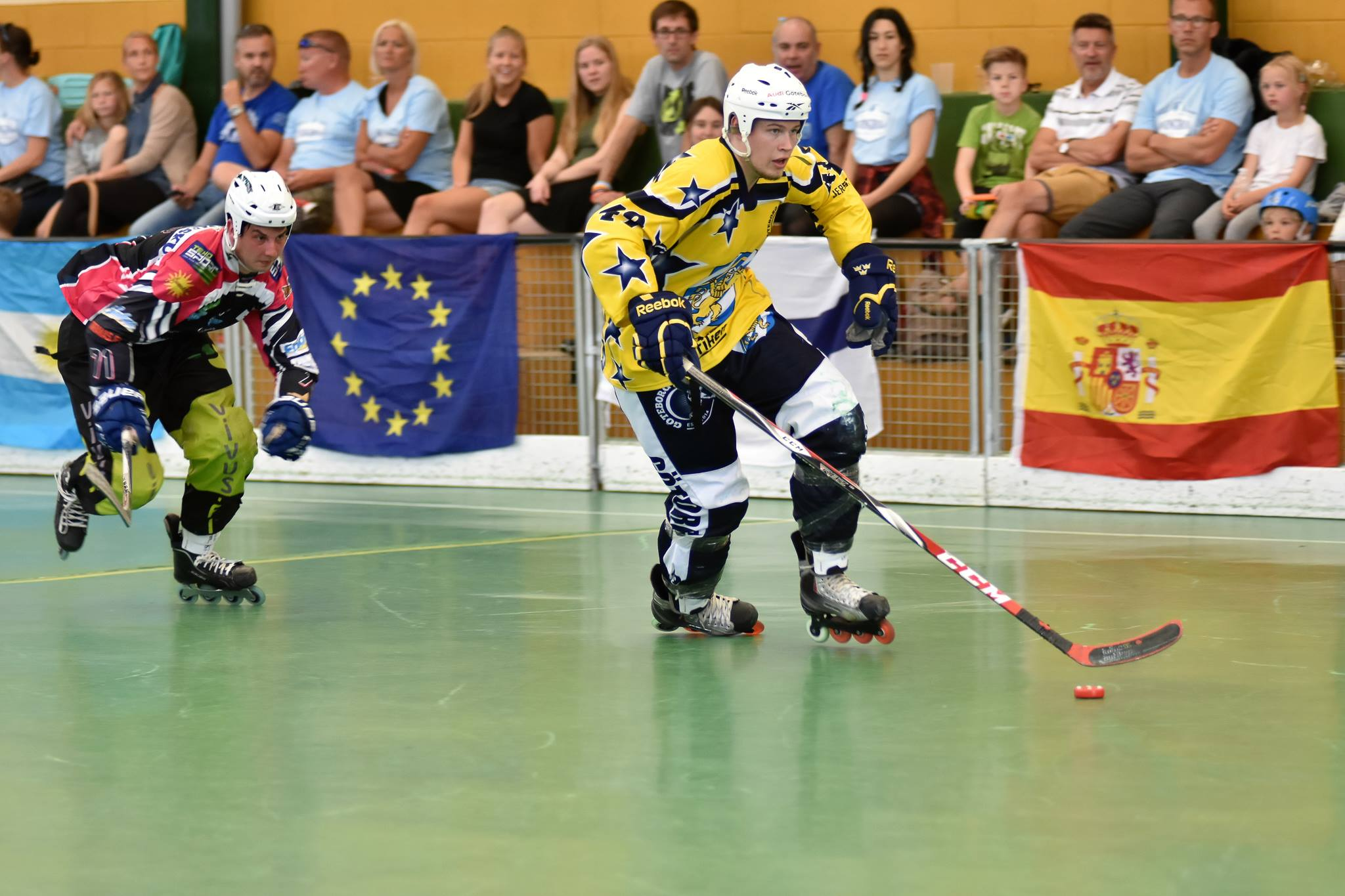
- Inline hockey players
- Highest governing body: World Skate (puck) and International Inline Skater Hockey Federation (ball)
- First played: 20th century United States

Characteristics
- Contact: Yes
- Team members: 5 per side (including goaltender)
- Mixed-sex: Yes, separate competitions
- Type: Team sport
- Equipment: Inline hockey puck; hockey stick; inline skates; hockey helmet; elbow pads; inline hockey pants; shin pads; mouth guard; hockey jersey; hockey gloves
- Venue: Inline hockey arena

Presence
- Country or region: Worldwide
- Olympic: No
- World Games: 2005 – present

Inline hockey or roller hockey is a variant of hockey played on a hard, smooth surface, with players using inline skates to move and ice hockey sticks to shoot a hard, plastic puck into their opponent's goal to score points. The sport is a very fast-paced and free-flowing game and is considered a contact sport, but body checking is prohibited. There are five players including the goalkeeper from each team on the rink at a time, while teams normally consist of 16 players. There are professional leagues, one of which is the Professional Inline Hockey Association.

Unlike ice hockey, there are no blue lines or defensive zones in roller hockey. This means that, according to most rule codes, there are no offsides or icings that can occur during gameplay. This along with fewer players on the rink allows for faster gameplay. There are traditionally two 20-minute periods or four 10-minute periods with a stopped clock.

Internationally, inline hockey is represented by the World Skate which organized an annual world championship, the International Ice Hockey Federation (IIHF) ceased to organize its own championship. In the United States, the highest governing body for the sport is USA Roller Sports (USARS). USARS is credited with the development of the present-day rules and regulations that is used throughout multiple tournament series. They organize tournaments across the United States but they are not the only tournament provider. Some of the other independent tournament providers include Amateur Athletic Union, North American Roller Championships, and the Torhs 2 Hot 4 Ice tournament series.

Due to the 2022 Russian invasion of Ukraine, World Skate banned Russian and Belarusian athletes and officials from its competitions, and will not stage any events in Russia or Belarus in 2022.

== History ==
Some of the earliest video evidence of the sport is newsreel footage from the Giornale Luce taken in Vienna, Austria in 1938. The video shows players using inline skates with five metal wheels and a front wheel brake. Each team has four skaters plus a netminder. They are using ice hockey sticks, with taped blades, and the goals closely resemble ice hockey goals of the wire-mesh type common in Europe around that time. The game is being played with a ball on a rectangular outdoor court, which appears to be asphalt.

The exact same footage was used in a newsreel produced by British Pathé in 1938.

=== History in North America ===
In the United States, the USA Roller Sports (USARS) predecessor organization was the Roller Skating Rink Operators Association (RSROA). In 1940, the RSROA published a set of roller hockey rules drawn from a booklet by the National Hockey League (NHL) which was designed to grow interest in playing hockey on roller skates. However, because of the intervention of World War II, the organization of roller hockey tournaments did not receive significant development until after this war in the late 1940s. At first skating club interest was confined to the northern tier of the United States, including the bordering Canadian cities. Puck roller hockey's spread in popularity during that period was helped along by the attention of local commercial television, which was getting its start and in desperate need for events to fill air time. The increased interest in the sport led in 1959 to the selection of a National Puck Hockey Committee to formulate special rules for the performance of puck hockey in the variety of rink sizes available to roller skates. The American Roller Hockey Association (ARHA) was formed with Joe Spillman, a roller rink operator from San Antonio, Texas as its first Commissioner. Under Spillman's direction, the sport of hockey on roller skates grew rapidly throughout the United States.

During the 1960 RSROA National Roller Skating Championships held in Little Rock, Arkansas, exhibition games for ball and puck roller hockey were held. Following these Nationals, the first full competitive season officially began in North America for roller hockey. This, of course, had puck roller hockey entirely performed on quad skates, for at that time there were no inline skates available. State and regional competitions determined the teams that would move on to the North American Championships.

In 1962, at Pershing Auditorium in Lincoln, Nebraska, both ball and puck hockey were part of the North American Championships. The Arcadia Wildcats from Detroit, Michigan, defeated the Van Wert Chiefs 3–1, becoming the first puck hockey national champions on quad skates. Inline skates were not commercially available during that era.

On 1 September 1965, during their semi-annual board meeting, the RSROA installed puck hockey as an equal and separate division of roller hockey, which included ball hockey, a format most popular in Europe and South America. It was decided that both ball and puck hockey would compete under the same rules and award separate gold medal winners. Budd Van Roekel, RSROA president, was quoted in the January 1965 issue of Skate Magazine,

We believe this move will spark further growth of our roller hockey program. While we recognize the popularity of the international ball-and-cane version of hockey, we also realize that thousands of potential United States and Canadian players are more familiar with the Canadian stick-and-puck type sport. We see no reason why the two versions of the sport cannot grow side by side.

— Budd Van Roekel, Roller Skating Rink Operators Association president (RSROA), Skate Magazine (1965)

The 1966 North American Championships marked the return of puck hockey after a four-year hiatus. The final game was a nail biter and the crowd appreciated the fast pace and excitement of puck hockey. The final game was between the Canadians of Windsor, Ontario and the Wildcats of Detroit, Michigan, the defending champions from 1962. The score seesawed between the two teams and was finally decided in favor of the Canadians with a final score of 5 to 3. The win gave the Canadian team their only gold medal for the whole North American Championships. One Canadian team player was quoted in the 1966 Fall issue of Skate Magazine, "We simply had to win the (puck) hockey championships, otherwise our fathers wouldn't allow us to return home." Another milestone occurred for puck roller hockey in 1977, when the North American Puck Hockey Championship was held in a venue away from ball hockey for the first time. The 1977 puck championships were staged in Houston, Texas to large crowds and a great amount of publicity, as fourteen newspapers and television stations covered the event. The year 1977 was also a milestone for women with this championship marking the debut of a women's hockey national championship.

==== Transition from quads to inline ====
The very first inline roller hockey team to earn a USA National Championship title did so at a USA Roller Sports (USARS) National Championship held in San Diego in July 1993. At the previous 1992 USARS National Championships, also staged in San Diego, the San Diego Hosers won the Senior Gold Division title wearing their customary quad roller skates. As of that time, the Hosers manager/coach Paul Chapey felt that while inline skates were obviously faster, the advantage was to quad skates because of their assumed greater maneuverability. Some teams and individual players at the 1992 Nationals had been equipped with inline skates, but perhaps had not yet mastered their new vehicles. During the ensuing year, Paul Chapey became an inline convert and the San Diego Hosers came back to the USAC/RS Nationals in 1993 entirely on inline skates and recaptured their national title. This significant event took place at least a year before all the other major roller inline hockey organizations were even in existence, including National Inline Hockey Association (NIHA), USA Hockey InLine, North American Roller Hockey Championships (NARCh) and American Inline Roller Hockey Series (AIRHS).

USA Roller Sports, under the auspices of Fédération Internationale de Roller Sports (FIRS), established and hosted the first World Inline Roller Hockey Championships for men at the Odeum Arena in Villa Park, Illinois (a suburb of Chicago) in 1995. USA Roller Sports established the first Inline Hockey World Championships for Juniors, again in Chicago in 1996, following the USA National Championships. The first World Inline Hockey Championships for Women occurred under sponsorship of USA Roller Sports in Rochester, New York in 2002. Since the introduction of these events, FIRS National Federations around the world have annually perpetuated inline world championships. USA (Ice) Hockey and International Ice Hockey Federation (IIHF) began their men's InLine Hockey World Championship in 1996, after the first such world championship by FIRS and has yet to organize a women's inline hockey world tournament or one for juniors.

In March 2002, the United States Olympic Committee (USOC) Membership and Credentials Committee officially reaffirmed that USA Roller Sports as the governing body for inline hockey in the United States, which continues to this day. This determination was based on a conclusion by the USOC that internationally the sport of inline hockey is recognized as a discipline of roller sports. Then, as now, USA Roller Sports is a member in good standing of Federation International de Roller Sports ("FIRS"), the international federation for roller sports as recognized by the International Olympic Committee, and FIRS is also recognized by the Pan American Sports Organization (PASO) as the controlling international federation for inline hockey, a sport of the Pan American Games.

=== History in Europe ===
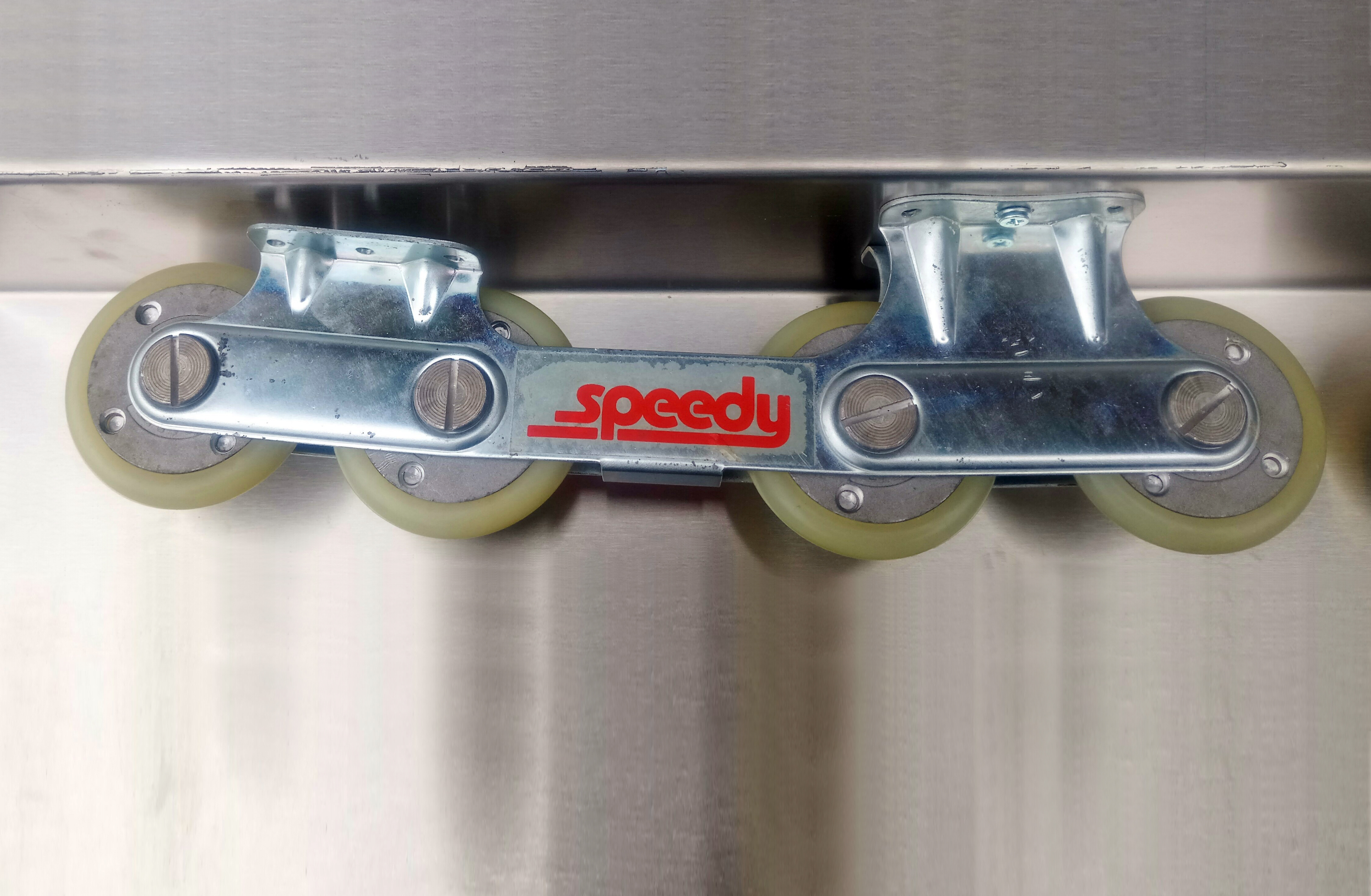
SKF-Speedy, 1978

For training purposes especially for hockey players, inline skates were produced in small quantities by several companies which were in fact modified ice skates, one of them was the "Speedy" by SKF which was available also with hockey-wheels. This changed when mass-produced inline skates from the USA were available in the early 1990s. In the mid-1990s first leagues started.

Inline roller hockey was introduced to the World Games for the first time in 2005, an International Olympic Committee (IOC) sanctioned event under the jurisdiction of the International World Games Association (IWGA), an affiliate of the General Association of International Sports Federations (GAISF). The United States won the gold medal, with Canada taking the Silver and Switzerland the bronze medal. Inline roller hockey replaced rink hockey (ball and cane) on the World Games program for Duisburg, Germany at the 2005 quadrennial World Games. Rink roller hockey had been part of the World Games since its first organization in 1979 at Santa Clara, California, as have the other disciplines of roller sports.

During the General Assembly of the IWGA, which took place in Madrid on 14 May 2003, the IWGA unanimously agreed that inline roller hockey was the responsibility of FIRS and that this variant form of roller hockey would be included on the program of the 2005 World Games in place of the previous format. This same scenario had previously played out before the Pan American Sports Organization in 1999, when inline hockey made its first appearance at the Pan American Games in Canada, and repeated again four years later in the Dominican Republic. PASO extends continued recognition of the inline hockey under the jurisdiction of FIRS. (sub to PAPA H)

Due to the 2022 Russian invasion of Ukraine, World Skate banned Russian and Belarusian athletes and officials from its competitions, and will not stage any events in Russia or Belarus in 2022.

== Professional inline hockey ==
The Professional Inline Hockey Association (PIHA) is an "incorporated for-profit association" which operates an inline hockey league, with two conferences, of 13 franchised member clubs, all of which are currently located in the United States. It is headquartered in Middletown, Pennsylvania. The Founders Cup Finals is held annually to crown the league playoff champion in the Pro and Minor divisions at the end of each season. PIHA also offers divisions for teens (Junior PIHA), & adults 35-and-over (Masters Division).

The French Ligue Elite is a professional league in Europe.

== Chief differences from ice hockey ==
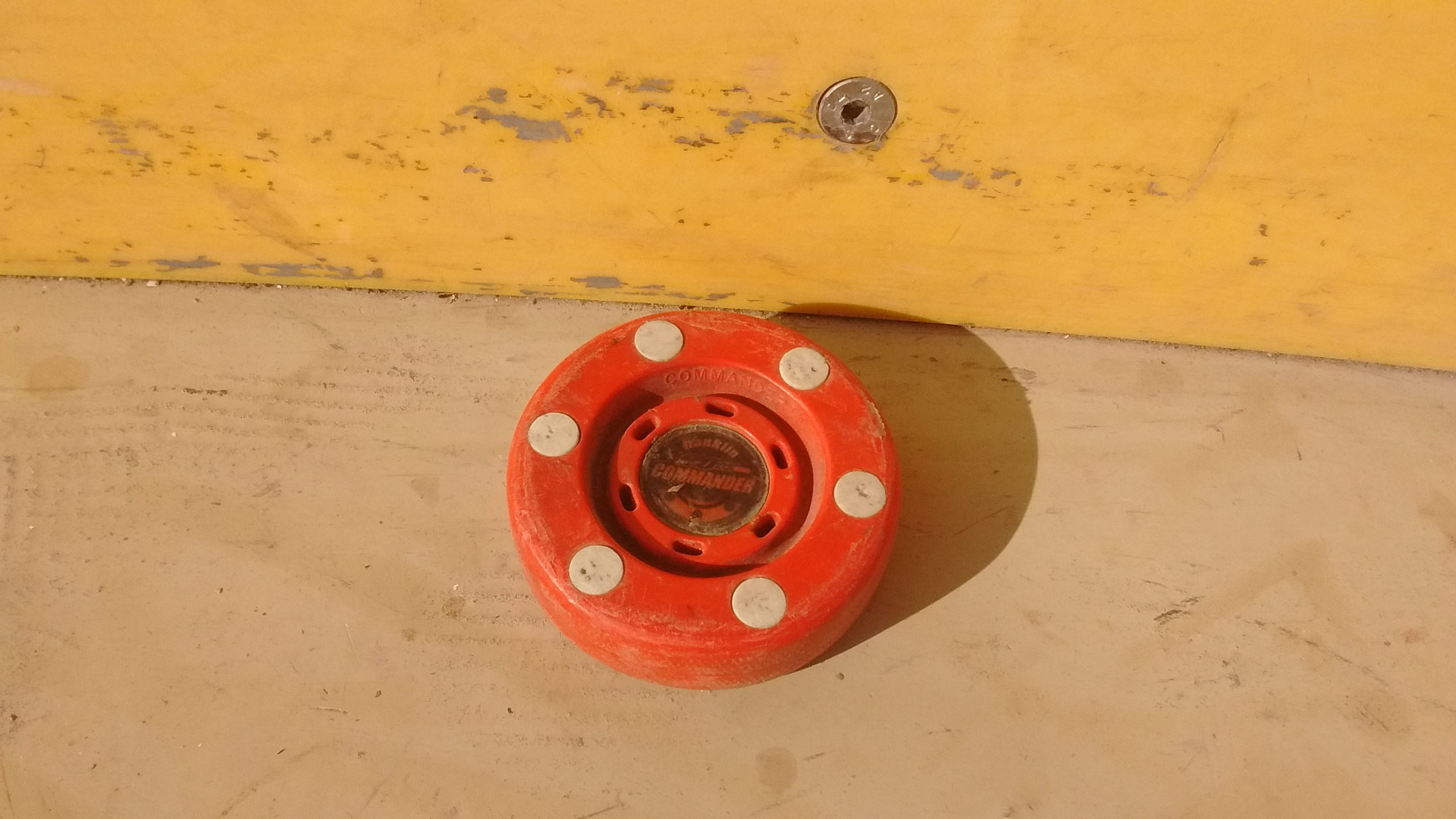
Inline-Hockey Puck

Although inline hockey appears to simply be ice hockey on inline skates, this singular difference reflects throughout the rest of the game, resulting in important differences between the two sports.

Inline hockey is typically played at room temperature on a surface that, rather than being made from (frozen) water, is kept dry to protect the bearings in the skate wheels and ensure grip for the rubber wheels. Several surface materials are used, including plastic tiles (sometimes known as sport-court flooring), wood, and sealed concrete; in general, surfaces try to balance the ability of wheels to grip against the ability of the puck to slide freely. None of these surfaces, however, is as smooth as ice; as a result, the puck is made of a much lighter plastic material, and rests on small nylon or poly-plastic nubs to reduce friction with the rink surface.

Besides these equipment differences, inline hockey uses less physical contact in comparison to ice hockey. Most leagues punish fighting harshly, and body checking is usually ruled a penalty. Inline hockey leagues generally require players to wear full face masks, but otherwise, players tend to wear lighter clothes and less protective padding.

Important differences in game rules also exist. Each inline hockey team fields only four skaters and one goaltender (5 players) rather than ice hockey's five skaters and one goaltender (six players). Many leagues do not stop play for icing. Offside rules are generally looser as well; originally, a few leagues would call offside only on the center line, presently, every rule book omits the rule entirely.

== Equipment ==
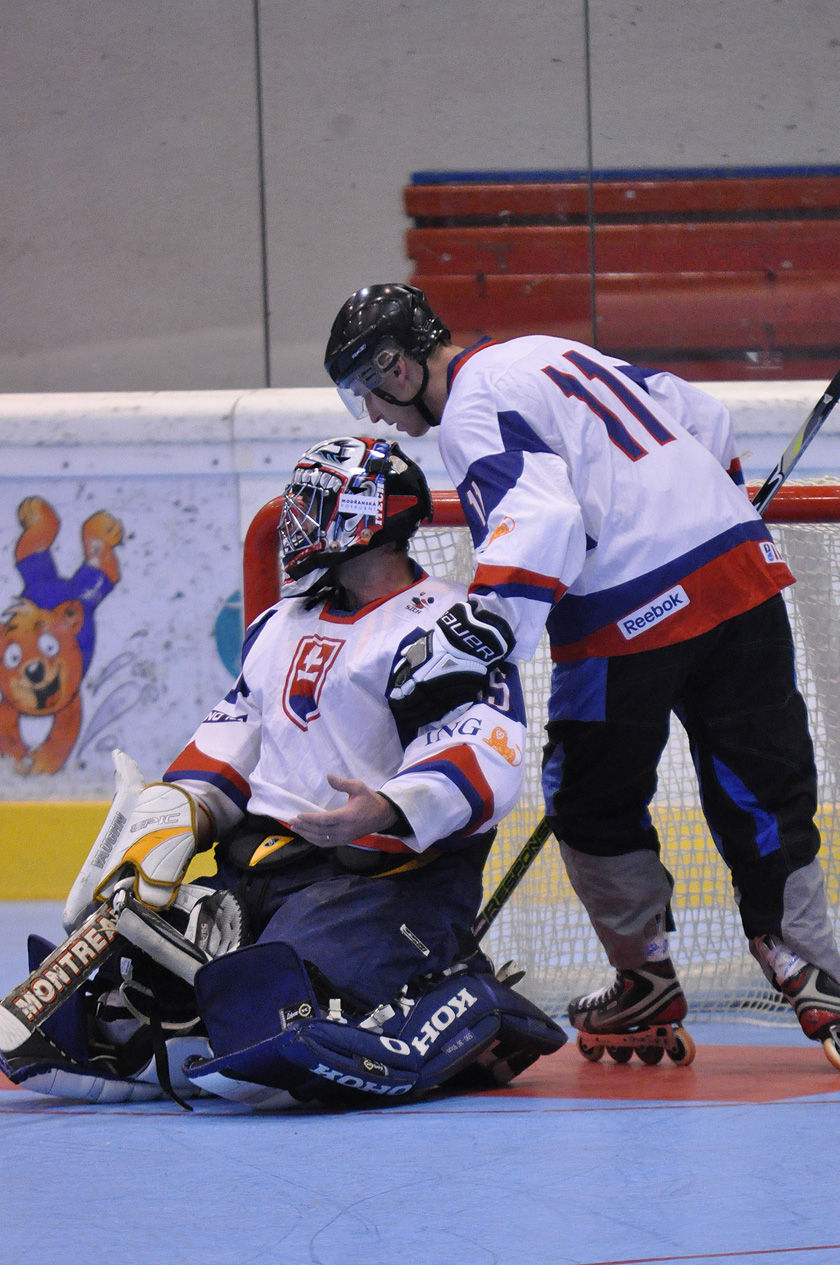
Most protective equipment is similar to that used in ice hockey

Inline hockey is a contact sport. Although body checks are usually not allowed, injuries can still be a common occurrence. Protective equipment is highly recommended and is enforced in all competitive situations. This usually includes a helmet (cage worn if certain age), elbow pads, protective gloves, athletic cup, shin pads, and skates at the very least. In addition, goaltenders use different gear, (optionally) a neck guard, chest/arm protector, blocker, catch glove, and leg pads.

=== Skates ===
Good skates are stiffer and lighter and also have better bearings. Inline hockey-skates are similar to icehockey-skates, the main difference between ice and inline is the chassis and the wheels. Hockey equipment manufacturers such as Bauer and CCM offer parallel models of ice skates, but there are also inline hockey brands, including Mission, Tour and Labeda.

Most inline hockey skates had have a chassis with 4 identical wheels on each boot in 72, 76 or 80 mm diameter, or the "Hi-Lo" configuration of two low wheels in front and two higher rear, this was patented on 12 July 1996 by Jon G Wong in the US and marketed by Mission. There is also a chassis with a "Tri-Di" option, which allows three wheel sizes to be mounted on a chassis, in the configuration 80-76-76-72 mm. Inline Hockey wheels are much softer than road wheels, and therefore have more abrasion. The softest are used for soft surfaces like gym floors or interlocking plastic tiles, harder are used for surfaces such as asphalt.

== The rink ==
The area where Inline hockey is played in known as a "rink". It consists of a playing surface that is surrounded by a boundary (commonly referred to as "dasher boards"), that is designed to separate the players from the spectators as well as to keep the puck in play. The playing surface is made of sport tile, wood, asphalt or cement and marked with special lines that help the referees officiate the game according to the official rules.

The recommended size of the rink is 50 by 25 metres (164 ft × 82 ft). However, it can vary between the ice hockey standard of 60 by 30 metres (197 ft × 98 ft) and the smallest Germany old standard of 40 by 20 metres (131 ft × 66 ft).

=== Goal cages ===
One of the most fundamental differences between the IIHF and World Skate-sanctioned versions of inline hockey lies within the dimensions of the net. The IIHF simply retains the use of ice hockey nets. However the World Skate rulebook substitutes the traditional ice hockey cage for a lower and narrower model patterned after the one used in rink hockey, the World Skates' flagship sport, however most World Skate leagues in the United States and Canada opt for the more popular and common ice hockey nets.

== Game ==
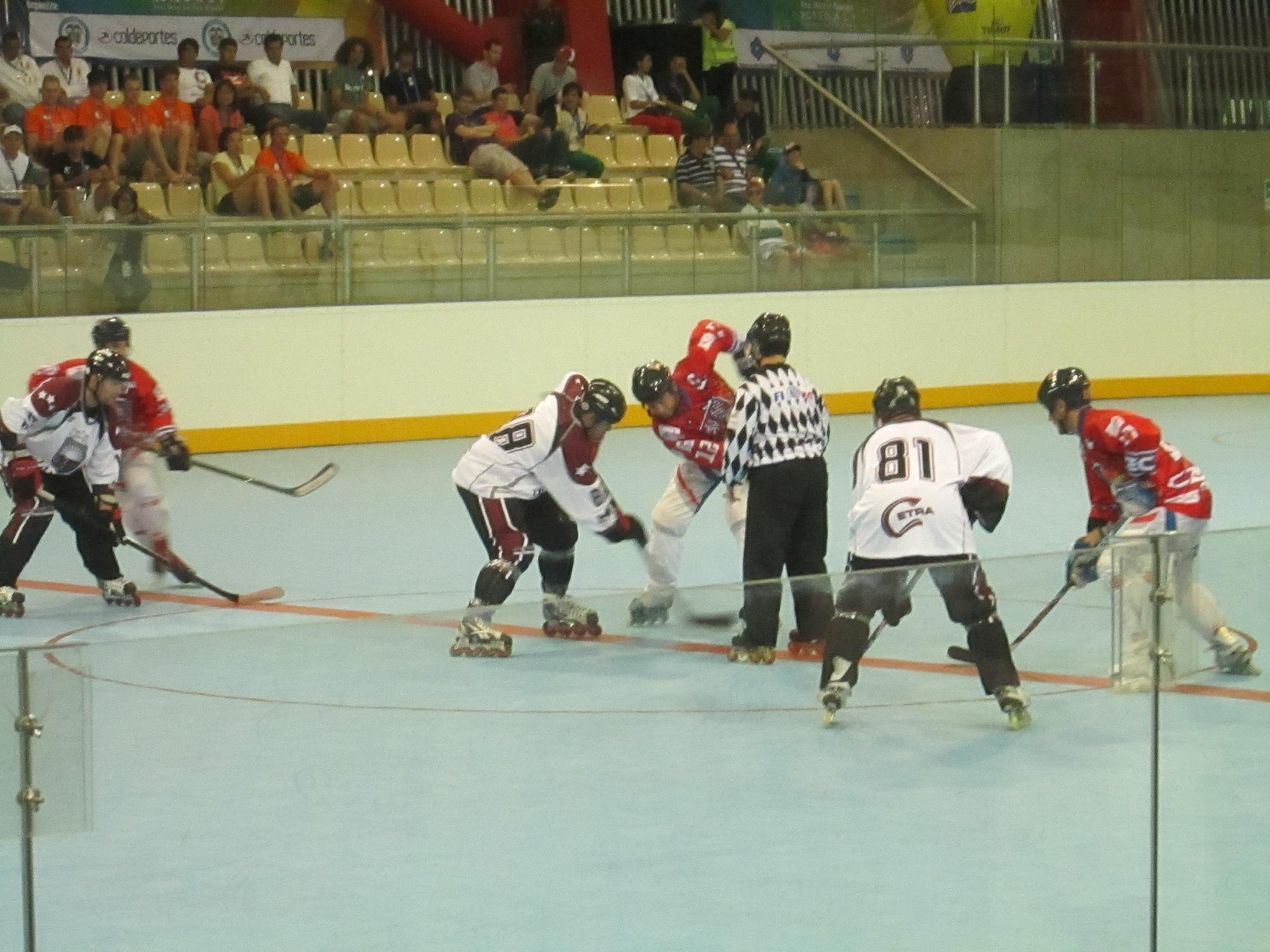
An international match between Latvia and Czech Republic

While the general characteristics of the game are the same wherever it is played, the exact rules depend on the particular code of play being used. The most important code is that of the World Skate.

Inline hockey is played on an inline hockey rink. During normal play, there are five players per side on the floor at any time, one of them being the goaltender, each of whom is on inline hockey skates. The objective of the game is to score goals by shooting a hard plastic disc, the puck, into the opponent's goal net, which is placed at the opposite end of the rink. The players may control the puck using a long stick with a blade that is commonly curved at one end.

Players may also redirect the puck with any part of their bodies, subject to certain restrictions. Players may not hold the puck in their hand and are prohibited from using their hands to pass the puck to their teammates, unless they are in the defensive zone. Players are also prohibited from kicking the puck into the opponent's goal, though unintentional redirections off the skate are permitted. Players may not intentionally bat the puck into the net with their hands.

The four players other than the goaltender are typically divided into two forwards and two defencemen. The forward positions consist of a center and a winger. The defencemen usually stay together as a pair generally divided between left and right. A substitution of an entire unit at once is called a line change. Teams typically employ alternate sets of forward lines and defensive pairings when shorthanded or on a power play. Substitutions are permitted at any time during the course of the game, although during a stoppage of play the home team is permitted the final change. When players are substituted during play, it is called changing on the fly.

The boards surrounding the floor help keep the puck in play and they can also be used as tools to play the puck. Players are not permitted to "bodycheck" opponents into the boards as a means of stopping progress. The referees and the outsides of the goal are "in play" and do not cause a stoppage of the game when the puck or players are influenced (by either bouncing or colliding) into them. Play can be stopped if the goal is knocked out of position. Play often proceeds for minutes without interruption. When play is stopped, it is restarted with a faceoff. Two players "face" each other and an official drops the puck to the floor, where the two players attempt to gain control of the puck. Markings on the floor indicate the locations for the "faceoff" and guide the positioning of players.

There is one major rule of play in inline hockey that limit the movement of the puck: the puck going out of play. The puck goes "out of play" whenever it goes past the perimeter of the rink (Onto the player benches, over the "glass," or onto the protective netting above the glass) and a stoppage of play is called by the officials using whistles. It also does not matter if the puck comes back onto the playing surface from those areas as the puck is considered dead once it leaves the perimeter of the rink.

Under World Skate rules, each team may carry a maximum of 14 players and two goaltenders on their roster. The players are usually divided into three lines of two forwards, two pairs of defenceman, and two extra skaters.

== Penalties ==
For most penalties, the offending player is sent to the "penalty box" and his team has to play with one less skater for a short amount of time. Minor penalties last for two minutes, major penalties last for five minutes, and a double minor penalty is two consecutive penalties of two minutes duration. A single Minor penalty may be extended by a further two minutes for drawing blood from the victimized player. The team that has taken the penalty is said to be playing shorthanded while the other team is on a power play.

A two-minute minor penalty is often called for lesser infractions such as tripping, elbowing, roughing, high-sticking, delay of the game, too many players on the rink, boarding, illegal equipment, holding, interference, hooking, slashing, butt-ending (striking an opponent with the knob of the stick—a very rare penalty) Or cross-checking. A minor is also assessed for diving, where a player embellishes a hook or trip. More egregious fouls may be penalized by a four-minute double-minor penalty, particularly those which cause injury to the victimized player. These penalties end either when the time runs out or the other team scores on the power play. In the case of a goal scored during the first two minutes of a double-minor, the penalty clock is set down to two minutes upon a score effectively expiring the first minor penalty. Five-minute major penalties are called for especially violent instances of most minor infractions that result in intentional injury to an opponent, or when a "minor" penalty results in visible injury (such as bleeding), as well as for fighting. Major penalties are always served in full; they do not terminate on a goal scored by the other team.

Some varieties of penalties do not always require the offending team to play a man short. Concurrent five-minute major penalties in the FIRS usually result from fighting. In the case of two players being assessed five-minute fighting majors, they both serve five minutes without their team incurring a loss of player (both teams still have a full complement of players on the floor). This differs with two players from opposing sides getting minor penalties, at the same time or at any intersecting moment, resulting from more common infractions. In that case, both teams will have only three skating players (not counting the goaltender) until one or both penalties expire (if one expires before the other, the opposing team gets a power play for the remainder); this applies regardless of current pending penalties, though in the FIRS, a team always has at least two skaters on the rink. Ten-minute misconduct penalties are served in full by the penalized player, but his team may immediately substitute another player on the floor unless a minor or major penalty is assessed in conjunction with the misconduct (a two-and-ten or five-and-ten). In that case, the team designates another player to serve the minor or major; both players go to the penalty box, but only the designee may not be replaced, and he is released upon the expiration of the two or five minutes, at which point the ten-minute misconduct begins. In addition, game misconducts are assessed for deliberate intent to inflict severe injury on an opponent (at the officials' discretion), or for a major penalty for a stick infraction or repeated major penalties. The offending player is ejected from the game and must immediately leave the playing surface (he does not sit in the penalty box); meanwhile, if a minor or major is assessed in addition, a designated player must serve out that segment of the penalty in the box (similar to the above-mentioned "two-and-ten"). In some rare cases, a player may receive up to nineteen minutes in penalties for one string of plays. This could involve receiving a four-minute double minor penalty, getting in a fight with an opposing player who retaliates, and then receiving a game misconduct after the fight. In this case, the player is ejected and two teammates must serve the double-minor and major penalties.

A player who is tripped, or illegally obstructed in some way, by an opponent on a breakaway – when there are no defenders except the goaltender between him and the opponent's goal – is awarded a penalty shot, an attempt to score without opposition from any defenders except the goaltender. A penalty shot is also awarded for a defender other than the goaltender covering the puck in the goal crease, a goaltender intentionally displacing his own goal posts during a breakaway to avoid a goal, a defender intentionally displacing his own goal posts when there is less than two minutes to play in regulation time or at any point during overtime, or a player or coach intentionally throwing a stick or other object at the puck or the puck carrier and the throwing action disrupts a shot or pass play.

Officials also stop play for puck movement violations, such as using one's hands to pass the puck in the offensive end, but no players are penalized for these offenses. The sole exceptions are deliberately falling on or gathering the puck to the body, carrying the puck in the hand, and shooting the puck out of play in one's defensive zone (all penalized two minutes for delay of game).

== Officials ==
A typical game of inline hockey has two officials on the floor, charged with enforcing the rules of the game. There are typically two referees who call goals and penalties. Due to not having offside and icing violations, there usually are no linesmen used. On-ice officials are assisted by off-ice officials who act as time keepers, and official scorers.

Officials are selected by the league for which they work. Amateur hockey leagues use guidelines established by national organizing bodies as a basis for choosing their officiating staffs. In North America, the national organizing bodies USA Roller Sports and Canada Inline approve officials according to their experience level as well as their ability to pass rules knowledge and skating ability tests.

== Tactics ==
=== Offensive tactics ===
Offensive tactics include improving a team's position on the floor by advancing the puck towards the opponent's goal. World Skate rules have no offside or two-line passes. A player may pass the puck to a player on any spot on the floor. Offensive tactics, are designed ultimately to score a goal by taking a shot. When a player purposely directs the puck towards the opponent's goal, he or she is said to "shoot" the puck.

A deflection is a shot which redirects a shot or a pass towards the goal from another player, by allowing the puck to strike the stick and carom towards the goal. A one-timer is a shot which is struck directly off a pass, without receiving the pass and shooting in two separate actions. Headmanning the puck, also known as cherry-picking, the stretch pass or breaking out, is the tactic of rapidly passing to the player farthest down the floor.

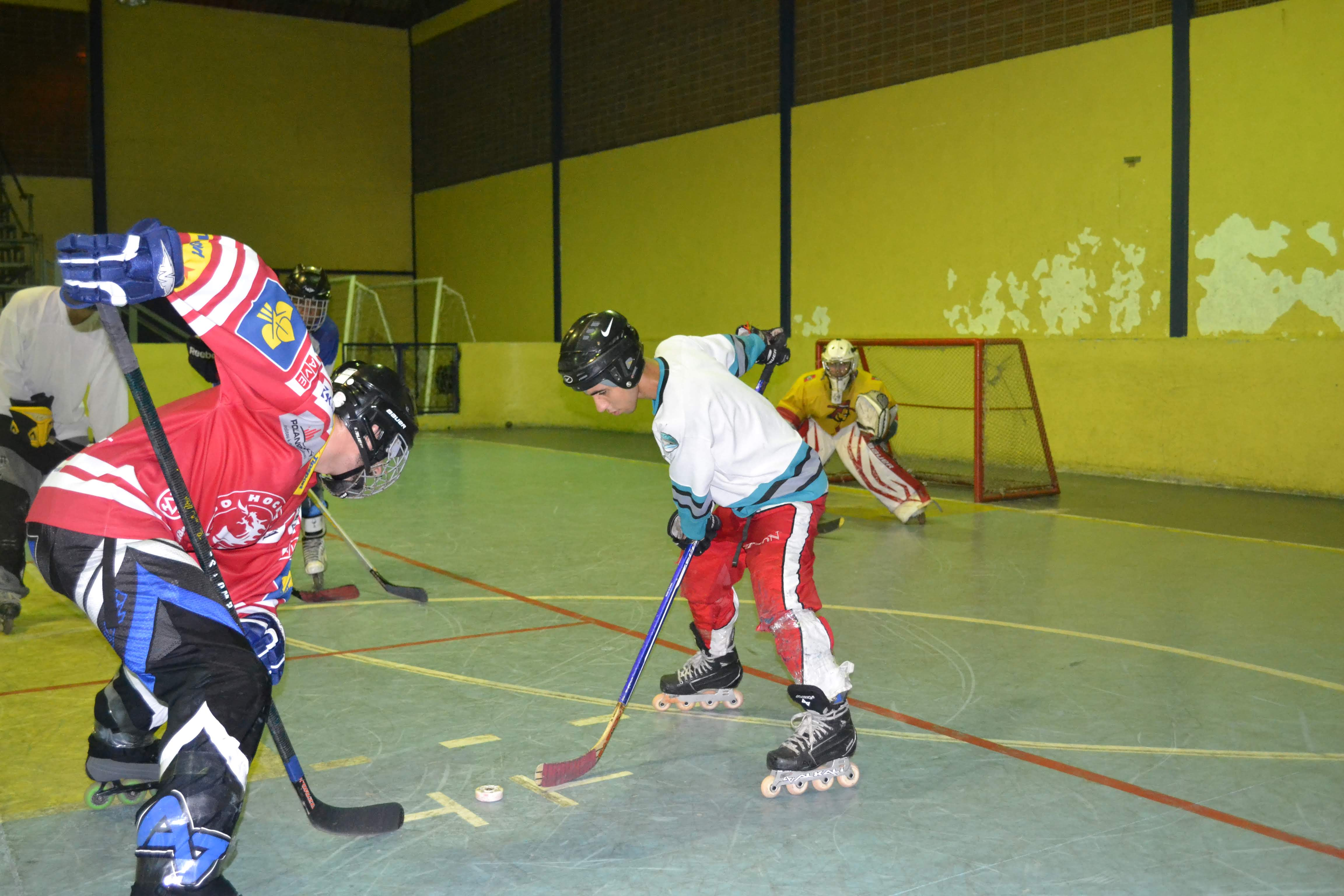
Two Brazilian players getting ready for a faceoff during practice

A team that is losing by one or two goals in the last few minutes of play will often elect to pull the goalie; that is, remove the goaltender and replace him or her with an extra attacker on the floor in the hope of gaining enough advantage to score a goal. However, it is an act of desperation, as it sometimes leads to the opposing team extending their lead by scoring a goal in the empty net.

A delayed penalty call occurs when a penalty offense is committed by the team that does not have possession of the puck. In this circumstance the team with possession of the puck is allowed to complete the play; that is, play continues until a goal is scored, a player on the opposing team gains control of the puck, or the team in possession commits an infraction or penalty of their own. Because the team on which the penalty was called cannot control the puck without stopping play, it is impossible for them to score a goal, however, it is possible for the controlling team to mishandle the puck into their own net. In these cases the team in possession of the puck can pull the goalie for an extra attacker without fear of being scored on. If a delayed penalty is signaled and the team in possession scores, the penalty is still assessed to the offending player, but not served.

One of the most important strategies for a team is their forecheck. Forechecking is the act of attacking the opposition in their defensive zone. Forechecking is an important part of roller hockey, because certain leagues and rules allow teams that have possession of the puck to sit behind their net and wait until they are pressured before having to advance the puck. Each team will use their own unique forecheck system but the main ones are: 1–1–2, 1–2–1, and 1–3. The 1–1–2 is the most basic forecheck system where one forward will go in deep and pressure the opposition's defencemen, the second forward stays in the slot, and the two defencemen high. The 1–3 is the most defensive forecheck system where one forward will apply pressure to the puck carrier in the opponent's zone and the other three players stand basically in a line in their defensive zone in hopes the opposition will skate into one of them.

Roller hockey is unique in that its rules resemble more of a basketball/soccer/lacrosse strategy in many ways versus a traditional ice hockey approach.

There are many other little tactics used in the game of hockey. Pinching is the term used when a defenceman pressures the opposition's winger in the offensive zone when they are breaking out, attempting to stop their attack and keep the puck in the offensive zone. A saucer pass is a pass used when an opposition's stick or body is in the passing lane. It is the act of raising the puck over the obstruction and having it land on a teammates' stick.

=== Deke ===
A "deke," short for "decoy," is a feint with the body and/or stick to fool a defender or the goalie. Due to the increased room and lack of body checking, many inline hockey players have picked up the skill of "dangling," which is more fancy deking and requires more stick handling skills. Some of the more impressive "dekes" or "dangles" include the toe-drag, the Pavel Datsyuk, the back hand toe-drag, and the spin-o-rama.

=== Fights ===
Fighting is prohibited in the rules. It does happen rarely, however. Players used to an ice hockey mentality fight to demoralize the opposing players while exciting their own, as well as settling personal scores. A fight will also break if one of the team's skilled players gets hit hard or someone gets hit by what the team perceives as a dirty hit. Amateur recreation level players who play strictly inline hockey never consider fisticuffs a legitimate behavior. The amateur game penalizes fisticuffs more harshly, as a player who receives a fighting major is also assessed at least a 10-minute misconduct penalty or a game misconduct penalty and suspension. Most local recreation leagues also suspend or ban players who engage in fights.

== Periods and overtime ==
A professional game consists of two halves of twenty minutes each, the clock running only when the puck is in play. The teams change ends for the second half, and again at the start of each overtime played (playoffs only; same ends as the second half otherwise). Some leagues such as the American Inline Hockey League (AIHL), recreational leagues and children's leagues often play shorter games, generally with two shorter periods or three running clock periods of play.

Various procedures are used if a game is tied. Some leagues and tournaments do not use an overtime, unless a "winner" must be determined, such as in tournament pool play and league regular season. Others will use either one, or a combination of; sudden death overtime periods, or penalty shootouts. Usually up to two 5-minute sudden death overtimes are played; if still tied, penalty shootouts.

== Playing surface ==
Indoor inline hockey is played on any suitable non-slip surface. While converted roller rinks may use wooden floors, dedicated inline hockey facilities use Sport Court or similar surface, which allows maximum traction to inline hockey wheels whilst providing a smooth, unbroken gliding surface for the puck. The playing area should be surrounded by full boards similar to ice hockey with glass or fencing to a height of around 2m. Often, especially in European countries, the game is played in indoor sports halls, on wooden floors. Therefore, there will be no standardized boards but instead the perimeter of the playing surface will be brick walls. In such cases, the corners of the hall are rounded off with added curved boards.

== Variants ==
=== Inline skater hockey ===
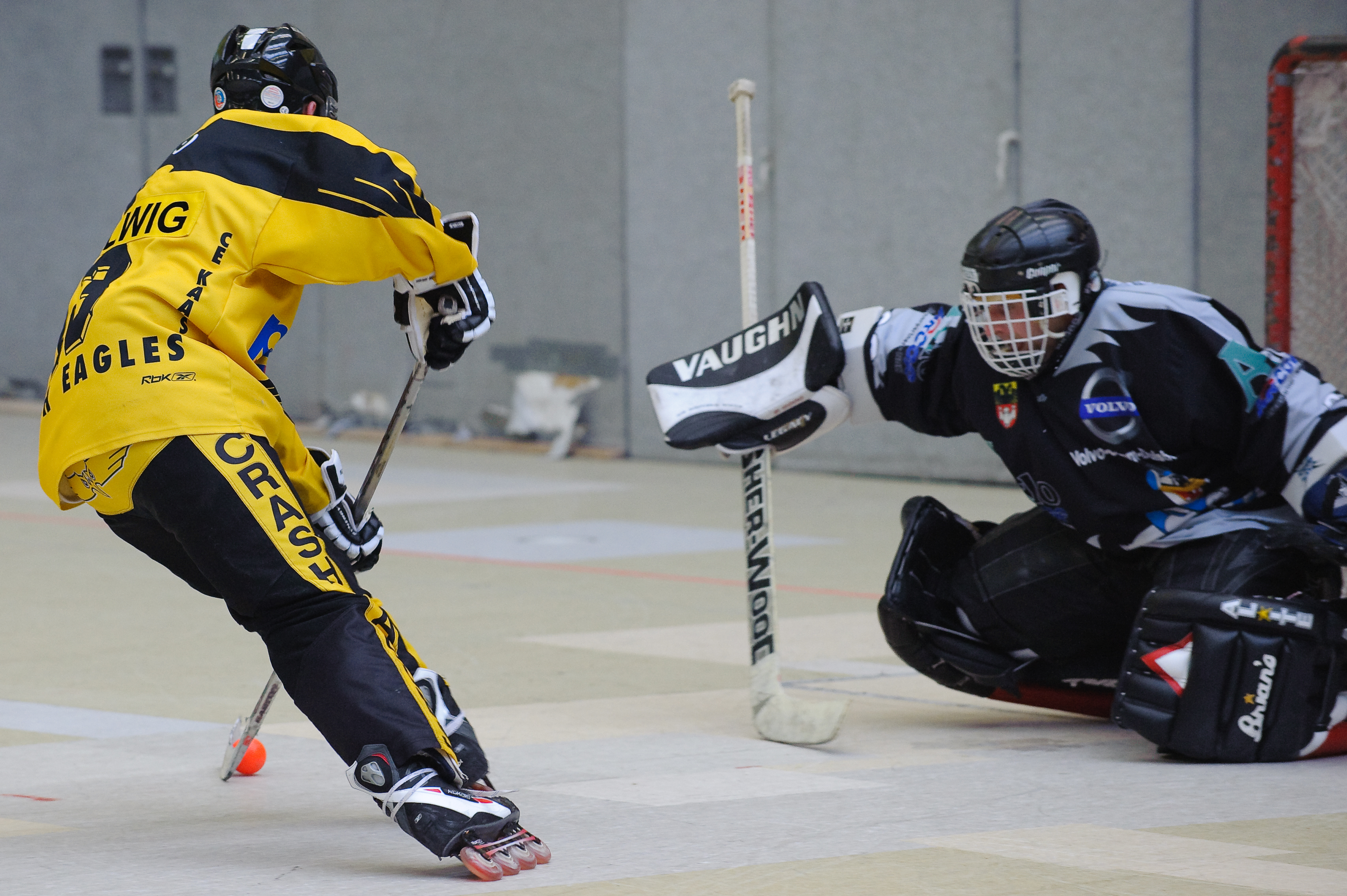
Inline skater hockey

Version of inline hockey played with a ball instead of puck, governed by International Inline Skater Hockey Federation.

=== Inline sledge hockey ===
Based on Ice Sledge Hockey, Inline Sledge Hockey is played to the same rules as Inline Puck Hockey (essentially ice hockey played off ice using inline skates) and has been made possible by the design and manufacture of inline sledges by RGK, Europe's premier sports wheelchair maker.

There is no classification points system dictating who can be involved in play within Inline Sledge Hockey unlike other team sports such as Wheelchair Basketball and Wheelchair Rugby. Inline Sledge Hockey is being developed to allow everyone, regardless of whether they have a disability or not, to complete up to World Championship level based solely on talent and ability. This makes Inline Sledge Hockey truly inclusive.

The first game of Inline Sledge Hockey was played at Bisley, England on 19 December 2009 between the Hull Stingrays and the Grimsby Redwings. Matt Lloyd (Paralympian) is credited with inventing Inline Sledge Hockey and Great Britain is seen as the international leader in the game's development.

=== Street hockey ===
Some forms of street hockey use inline skates in pick-up games on streets or parking lots. Street hockey tends to have very relaxed rules, as any pickup street game or sport would have.

=== Blind inline hockey ===
Blind inline hockey, also known as Sonic Hockey, is also played by athletes who are totally blind or visually impaired. Sighted players can also play, as all players must play while wearing opaque goggles, making all play sightless and "evening the playing field." The blind game is best played on a regulation inline surface with two orienting, tactile zone lines, each 60 feet from the goal line. Either 5v5 or 4v4 skaters, each plus goalies, are both good games.

The puck and goals each have a sounding device that enable the players to hear the puck and orient themselves to direction on the playing surface. The players constantly communicate to their teammates regarding their actions and positions on the floor enabling teamwork and playmaking. A sighted referee directs stoppages and restarts. All usual hockey rules apply to blind play.

== Sanctioning bodies ==
The sport is recognized as being governed by World Skate which organizes FIRS Inline Hockey World Championships. The International Ice Hockey Federation organized IIHF Inline Hockey World Championship but it has discontinued

== International competitions ==
There are several international competitions with national teams.

=== World ===
- Inline hockey at the World Games
- World Skate Games
- World Skate Inline Hockey World Championships
- IIHF Inline Hockey World Championship (defunct)

=== Regional ===
- European Inline Hockey Championships
- Asian Inline Hockey Championships

== Domestic competitions ==
=== United States ===
- Professional Inline Hockey Association
- National Roller Hockey League (inactive)
- Roller Hockey International (defunct)

== See also ==
- Roller hockey
- Street hockey
- Ice hockey
- Indoor field hockey
- Inline Hockey World Championships
