= Steve Poapst =

Canadian ice hockey player

- Born: January 3, 1969 (age 57) Cornwall, Ontario, Canada
- Height: 5 ft 11 in (180 cm)
- Weight: 199 lb (90 kg; 14 st 3 lb)
- Position: Defence
- Shot: Left
- Played for: Washington Capitals; Chicago Blackhawks; Pittsburgh Penguins; St. Louis Blues
- NHL draft: Undrafted
- Playing career: 1991–2006

Steve Ray Poapst (born January 3, 1969) is a Canadian former professional ice hockey defenceman who played seven seasons in the National Hockey League (NHL) for the Washington Capitals, Chicago Blackhawks, Pittsburgh Penguins and St. Louis Blues. Advancing to management after his playing career was over, he was named head coach of the USHL Chicago Steel in December 2006. In August 2010, Poapst moved up the ranks, taking an assistant coaching job with the Rockford IceHogs of the AHL, bringing him back into the Chicago Blackhawks system.

== Career statistics ==
=== Ice hockey ===
			Regular season					Playoffs
Season	Team	League	GP	G	A	Pts	PIM	GP	G	A	Pts	PIM
1987–88	Colgate Red Raiders	ECAC	32	3	13	16	22	—	—	—	—	—
1988–89	Colgate Red Raiders	ECAC	30	0	5	5	38	—	—	—	—	—
1989–90	Colgate Red Raiders	ECAC	38	4	15	19	54	—	—	—	—	—
1990–91	Colgate Red Raiders	ECAC	32	6	15	21	43	—	—	—	—	—
1991–92	Hampton Roads Admirals	ECHL	55	8	20	28	29	14	1	4	5	12
1992–93	Hampton-Roads Admirals	ECHL	63	10	35	45	57	4	0	1	1	4
1992–93	Baltimore Skipjacks	AHL	7	0	1	1	4	7	0	3	3	6
1993–94	Portland Pirates	AHL	78	14	21	35	47	12	0	3	3	8
1994–95	Portland Pirates	AHL	71	8	22	30	60	7	0	1	1	16
1995–96	Portland Pirates	AHL	70	10	24	34	79	20	2	6	8	16
1995–96	Washington Capitals	NHL	3	1	0	1	0	6	0	0	0	0
1996–97	Portland Pirates	AHL	47	1	20	21	34	5	0	1	1	6
1997–98	Portland Pirates	AHL	76	8	29	37	46	10	2	3	5	8
1998–99	Portland Pirates	AHL	54	3	21	24	36	—	—	—	—	—
1998–99	Washington Capitals	NHL	22	0	0	0	8	—	—	—	—	—
1999–00	Portland Pirates	AHL	58	0	14	14	20	3	1	0	1	2
2000–01	Norfolk Admirals	AHL	37	1	8	9	14	—	—	—	—	—
2000–01	Chicago Blackhawks	NHL	36	2	3	5	12	—	—	—	—	—
2001–02	Chicago Blackhawks	NHL	56	1	7	8	30	5	0	0	0	0
2002–03	Chicago Blackhawks	NHL	75	2	11	13	50	—	—	—	—	—
2003–04	Chicago Blackhawks	NHL	53	2	2	4	26	—	—	—	—	—
2005–06	Pittsburgh Penguins	NHL	21	0	4	4	10	—	—	—	—	—
2005–06	St. Louis Blues	NHL	41	0	1	1	37	—	—	—	—	—
NHL totals			307	8	28	36	173	11	0	0	0	0

=== Roller hockey ===
			Regular season
Season	Team	League	GP	G	A	Pts	PIM
1994	New England Stingers	RHI	20	6	23	29	47

== Awards and honors ==
Award	Year
All-ECAC Hockey Rookie Team	1987–88
