= 2022 World Qualification Event =

- Host city: Lohja, Finland
- Arena: Kisakallio Sports Institute
- Dates: January 18–22
- Men's winner: Russia
- Skip: Sergey Glukhov
- Third: Evgeny Klimov
- Second: Dmitry Mironov
- Lead: Anton Kalalb
- Alternate: Daniil Goriachev
- Coach: Aleksandr Kozyrev; Svetlana Kalalb
- Finalist: Netherlands (Gösgens)
- Women's winner: Denmark
- Skip: Madeleine Dupont
- Third: Mathilde Halse
- Second: Denise Dupont
- Lead: My Larsen
- Coach: Heather Rogers
- Finalist: Norway (Rørvik)

The 2022 World Qualification Event for the World Curling Championships was held from January 18 to 22 at the Kisakallio Sports Institute in Lohja, Finland. The competition originally consisted of sixteen teams divided evenly into men's and women's divisions. The Brazilian Men's Team and the Kazakh Women's Team were removed from the competition schedule days before the tournament due to travel complications, leaving the competition with fourteen teams divided evenly into each division. The top two teams in the men's division qualified to compete at the 2022 World Men's Championship and similarly the top two teams in the women's division qualified to compete at the 2022 World Women's Championship.

On January 17, one day before the competition began, the Czech Republic women's team skipped by Alžběta Baudyšová had to withdraw from the competition due to two positive COVID-19 cases within the team. The Czech Curling Association had the option to send a replacement team to the event, but they declined.

In the men's division, Russia and the Netherlands both qualified for the 2022 World Men's Curling Championship. Russia defeated the Dutch team 6–3 in the first qualification final to earn their spot in the championship. The Netherlands then bounced back with a 9–4 victory over Finland to claim the final spot in the World Men's Championship.

On the women's side, Denmark and Norway both secured spots in the 2022 World Women's Curling Championship. Denmark won 7–6 over the Norwegian team in the first final and then Norway defeated Latvia 8–6 in the second final.

== Men ==
=== Qualification ===
Eight men's teams will qualify to participate in the 2022 World Qualification Event, through the following methods:

Event	Vacancies	Qualified
Host nation	1	Finland
2021 Americas Challenge	0	~~Brazil~~
2021 European Curling Championships	4	Netherlands; Turkey; Russia; Spain
2021 Pacific-Asia Curling Championships	2	Japan; Chinese Taipei
TOTAL	7	

Note: The Brazilian Men's Team qualified for this event, but they were unable to attend due to travel complications.

=== Teams ===
The teams are listed as follows:

Chinese Taipei	Finland	Japan	Netherlands
Skip: Lin Ting-li; Third: Nelson Wang; Second: Yin Liu Luis; Lead: Cheng Kai-wen; Alternate: Darren Lee	Skip: Kalle Kiiskinen; Third: Teemu Salo; Second: Leo Ouni; Lead: Paavo Kuosmanen; Alternate: Jermu Pöllänen	Skip: Takumi Maeda; Third: Uryu Kamikawa; Second: Hiroki Maeda; Lead: Asei Nakahara; Alternate: Hayato Sato	Skip: Wouter Gösgens; Third: Jaap van Dorp; Second: Laurens Hoekman; Lead: Carlo Glasbergen; Alternate: Alexander Magan
Russia	Spain	Turkey	
Skip: Sergey Glukhov; Third: Evgeny Klimov; Second: Dmitry Mironov; Lead: Anton Kalalb; Alternate: Daniil Goriachev	Skip: Sergio Vez; Third: Luis Gómez; Second: Eduardo de Paz; Lead: Nicholas Shaw; Alternate: Mikel Unanue	Fourth: Uğurcan Karagöz; Skip: Oğuzhan Karakurt; Second: Muhammed Zeki Uçan; Lead: Orhun Yüce; Alternate: Muhammet Haydar Demirel	

=== Round-robin standings ===
Final round-robin standings

Key
Teams to Playoffs

Country	Skip	W	L	W–L	DSC
Russia	Sergey Glukhov	5	1	–	26.40
Netherlands	Wouter Gösgens	4	2	1–0	21.96
Finland	Kalle Kiiskinen	4	2	0–1	29.20
Turkey	Oğuzhan Karakurt	3	3	1–0	41.81
Japan	Takumi Maeda	3	3	0–1	45.68
Spain	Sergio Vez	2	4	–	75.52
Chinese Taipei	Lin Ting-li	0	6	–	53.45

Round Robin Summary Table
Pos.	Country	Chinese Taipei	Finland	Japan	Netherlands	Russia	Spain	Turkey	Record
7	Chinese Taipei	—N/a	2–15	3–12	3–12	2–7	6–9	2–8	0–6
3	Finland	15–2	—	8–1	4–6	7–4	7–6	2–5	4–2
5	Japan	12–3	1–8	—	6–4	8–10	5–3	7–8	3–3
2	Netherlands	12–3	6–4	4–6	—	4–9	7–1	9–3	4–2
1	Russia	7–2	4–7	10–8	9–4	—	8–4	10–5	5–1
6	Spain	9–6	6–7	3–5	1–7	4–8	—	10–5	2–4
4	Turkey	8–2	5–2	8–7	3–9	5–10	5–10	—	3–3

=== Round-robin results ===
All draw times are listed in Eastern European Time (UTC+02:00).

==== Draw 1 ====
Tuesday, January 18, 9:00

Sheet B	1	2	3	4	5	6	7	8	9	10	Final
Turkey (Karakurt)	1	1	0	0	0	0	1	0	X	X	3
Netherlands (Gösgens) 🔨	0	0	2	1	2	2	0	2	X	X	9

Sheet D	1	2	3	4	5	6	7	8	9	10	Final
Chinese Taipei (Lin)	0	1	0	0	1	0	0	X	X	X	2
Finland (Kiiskinen) 🔨	7	0	3	2	0	2	1	X	X	X	15

==== Draw 2 ====
Tuesday, January 18, 14:00

Sheet B	1	2	3	4	5	6	7	8	9	10	Final
Chinese Taipei (Lin)	0	2	0	0	0	1	0	X	X	X	3
Japan (Maeda) 🔨	4	0	2	1	3	0	2	X	X	X	12

Sheet E	1	2	3	4	5	6	7	8	9	10	Final
Spain (Vez)	0	0	0	2	0	0	1	0	1	X	4
Russia (Glukhov) 🔨	0	0	3	0	1	2	0	2	0	X	8

==== Draw 3 ====
Tuesday, January 18, 19:00

Sheet B	1	2	3	4	5	6	7	8	9	10	Final
Finland (Kiiskinen) 🔨	1	0	0	1	0	2	0	0	0	3	7
Spain (Vez)	0	2	0	0	2	0	1	1	0	0	6

Sheet C	1	2	3	4	5	6	7	8	9	10	Final
Netherlands (Gösgens)	0	0	1	0	1	0	0	2	0	X	4
Russia (Glukhov) 🔨	0	1	0	0	0	2	2	0	4	X	9

Sheet D	1	2	3	4	5	6	7	8	9	10	Final
Japan (Maeda)	0	1	0	0	2	1	0	0	3	0	7
Turkey (Karakurt) 🔨	1	0	1	0	0	0	3	2	0	1	8

==== Draw 4 ====
Wednesday, January 19, 9:00

Sheet B	1	2	3	4	5	6	7	8	9	10	Final
Netherlands (Gösgens) 🔨	0	3	0	0	4	2	0	3	X	X	12
Chinese Taipei (Lin)	0	0	1	1	0	0	1	0	X	X	3

Sheet E	1	2	3	4	5	6	7	8	9	10	Final
Turkey (Karakurt)	0	0	2	1	0	0	0	0	1	1	5
Finland (Kiiskinen) 🔨	1	0	0	0	0	1	0	0	0	0	2

==== Draw 5 ====
Wednesday, January 19, 14:00

Sheet A	1	2	3	4	5	6	7	8	9	10	Final
Japan (Maeda) 🔨	2	0	0	0	1	0	0	0	0	2	5
Spain (Vez)	0	0	1	0	0	1	0	1	0	0	3

==== Draw 6 ====
Wednesday, January 19, 19:00

Sheet C	1	2	3	4	5	6	7	8	9	10	Final
Spain (Vez) 🔨	3	0	0	1	0	4	0	0	2	X	10
Turkey (Karakurt)	0	0	2	0	1	0	1	1	0	X	5

Sheet D	1	2	3	4	5	6	7	8	9	10	Final
Finland (Kiiskinen) 🔨	1	2	0	0	1	0	1	0	2	X	7
Russia (Glukhov)	0	0	1	1	0	1	0	1	0	X	4

==== Draw 7 ====
Thursday, January 20, 9:00

Sheet A	1	2	3	4	5	6	7	8	9	10	Final
Russia (Glukhov) 🔨	0	0	2	0	2	1	0	1	0	4	10
Japan (Maeda)	1	2	0	2	0	0	2	0	1	0	8

==== Draw 8 ====
Thursday, January 20, 15:00

Sheet A	1	2	3	4	5	6	7	8	9	10	Final
Turkey (Karakurt)	2	0	0	2	1	1	0	2	X	X	8
Chinese Taipei (Lin) 🔨	0	1	0	0	0	0	1	0	X	X	2

Sheet C	1	2	3	4	5	6	7	8	9	10	Final
Japan (Maeda) 🔨	0	0	0	1	0	0	X	X	X	X	1
Finland (Kiiskinen)	0	0	4	0	3	1	X	X	X	X	8

Sheet D	1	2	3	4	5	6	7	8	9	10	Final
Spain (Vez)	0	0	0	0	1	0	X	X	X	X	1
Netherlands (Gösgens) 🔨	1	0	5	1	0	0	X	X	X	X	7

==== Draw 9 ====
Friday, January 21, 9:00

Sheet A	1	2	3	4	5	6	7	8	9	10	Final
Finland (Kiiskinen) 🔨	0	1	1	0	1	0	0	0	1	0	4
Netherlands (Gösgens)	0	0	0	2	0	2	1	0	0	1	6

Sheet B	1	2	3	4	5	6	7	8	9	10	Final
Russia (Glukhov)	0	2	1	0	3	0	2	2	X	X	10
Turkey (Karakurt) 🔨	2	0	0	1	0	2	0	0	X	X	5

Sheet E	1	2	3	4	5	6	7	8	9	10	Final
Chinese Taipei (Lin) 🔨	0	1	0	1	1	0	2	0	1	0	6
Spain (Vez)	1	0	2	0	0	2	0	3	0	1	9

==== Draw 10 ====
Friday, January 21, 15:00

Sheet C	1	2	3	4	5	6	7	8	9	10	Final
Russia (Glukhov)	1	0	0	0	0	1	0	3	2	X	7
Chinese Taipei (Lin) 🔨	0	1	0	0	0	0	1	0	0	X	2

Sheet E	1	2	3	4	5	6	7	8	9	10	Final
Netherlands (Gösgens) 🔨	1	0	0	0	2	0	1	0	0	X	4
Japan (Maeda)	0	1	0	0	0	3	0	0	2	X	6

=== Playoffs ===
Qualification Game 1
1	Russia	6
2	Netherlands	3

Qualification Game 2
2	Netherlands	9
3	Finland	4

Qualify for World Championship
Russia
Netherlands

==== Qualification Game 1 ====
Saturday, January 22, 9:00

Sheet B	1	2	3	4	5	6	7	8	9	10	Final
Russia (Glukhov) 🔨	0	2	1	0	1	0	1	0	1	X	6
Netherlands (Gösgens)	0	0	0	1	0	1	0	1	0	X	3

Winner qualifies for 2022 World Men's Curling Championship.

Loser drops to Qualification Game 2.

==== Qualification Game 2 ====
Saturday, January 22, 14:00

Sheet C	1	2	3	4	5	6	7	8	9	10	Final
Netherlands (Gösgens) 🔨	0	1	0	0	0	2	1	2	0	3	9
Finland (Kiiskinen)	1	0	0	1	2	0	0	0	0	0	4

Winner qualifies for 2022 World Men's Curling Championship.

== Women ==
=== Qualification ===
Eight women's teams will qualify to participate in the 2022 World Qualification Event, through the following methods:

Event	Vacancies	Qualified
Host nation	1	Finland
2021 Americas Challenge	1	Brazil
2021 European Curling Championships	4	Denmark; Czech Republic; Norway; Latvia
2021 Pacific-Asia Curling Championships	1	~~Kazakhstan~~; Hong Kong
TOTAL	7	

Note: The Kazakh Women's Team qualified for this event, but they were unable to attend due to travel complications. Also, the Czech Women's team couldn't participate in the event due to positive COVID-19 cases on their team.

=== Teams ===
The teams are listed as follows:

Brazil	Czech Republic	Denmark	Finland
Skip: Isis Oliveira; Third: Sarah Lipi; Second: Kenya Franz; Lead: Marcelia Melo	Skip: Alžběta Baudyšová; Third: Petra Vinšová; Second: Michaela Baudyšová; Lead: Klára Svatoňová; Alternate: Lenka Hronová	Skip: Madeleine Dupont; Third: Mathilde Halse; Second: Denise Dupont; Lead: My Larsen	Skip: Miia Ahrenberg; Third: Susanna Säntti; Second: Minna Karvinen; Lead: Jenni Bäckman; Alternate: Tiina Suuripää
Hong Kong	Latvia	Norway	
Skip: Ling-Yue Hung; Third: Ada Shang; Second: Ashura Wong; Lead: On Na Anna Ngai	Skip: Evelīna Barone; Third: Rēzija Ieviņa; Second: Veronika Apse; Lead: Ērika Patrīcija Bitmete; Alternate: Letīcija Ieviņa	Skip: Marianne Rørvik; Third: Mille Haslev Nordbye; Second: Eirin Mesloe; Lead: Martine Rønning	

=== Round-robin standings ===
Final round-robin standings

Key
Teams to Playoffs

Country	Skip	W	L	W–L	DSC
Norway	Marianne Rørvik	6	0	–	33.63
Denmark	Madeleine Dupont	5	1	–	27.72
Latvia	Evelīna Barone	4	2	–	58.80
Finland	Miia Ahrenberg	3	3	–	118.40
Hong Kong	Ling-Yue Hung	2	4	–	83.91
Brazil	Isis Oliveira	1	5	–	81.18
Czech Republic	Alžběta Baudyšová	0	6	–	–

Round Robin Summary Table
Pos.	Country	Brazil	Czech Republic	Denmark	Finland	Hong Kong	Latvia	Norway	Record
6	Brazil	—	W–L	0–17	4–8	1–10	2–12	5–9	1–5
7	Czech Republic	L–W	—	L–W	L–W	L–W	L–W	L–W	0–6
2	Denmark	17–0	W–L	—	12–4	20–2	10–4	4–7	5–1
4	Finland	8–4	W–L	4–12	—	11–9	3–12	1–10	3–3
5	Hong Kong	10–1	W–L	2–20	9–11	—	4–12	4–12	2–4
3	Latvia	12–2	W–L	4–10	12–3	12–4	—	4–10	4–2
1	Norway	9–5	W–L	7–4	10–1	12–4	10–4	—	6–0

=== Round-robin results ===
All draw times are listed in Eastern European Time (UTC+02:00).

==== Draw 1 ====
Tuesday, January 18, 9:00

Sheet C	1	2	3	4	5	6	7	8	9	10	Final
Hong Kong (Hung) 🔨	1	2	3	2	1	0	1	X	X	X	10
Brazil (Oliveira)	0	0	0	0	0	1	0	X	X	X	1

Sheet E	1	2	3	4	5	6	7	8	9	10	Final
Finland (Ahrenberg)	0	0	1	0	0	0	0	X	X	X	1
Norway (Rørvik) 🔨	1	0	0	5	1	1	2	X	X	X	10

==== Draw 2 ====
Tuesday, January 18, 14:00

Sheet A	1	2	3	4	5	6	7	8	9	10	Final
Brazil (Oliveira)	0	0	0	0	0	0	X	X	X	X	0
Denmark (Dupont) 🔨	2	4	3	2	4	2	X	X	X	X	17

Sheet C	1	2	3	4	5	6	7	8	9	10	Final
Finland (Ahrenberg) 🔨	X	X	X	X	X	X	X	X	X	X	W
Czech Republic (Baudyšová)	X	X	X	X	X	X	X	X	X	X	L

Sheet D	1	2	3	4	5	6	7	8	9	10	Final
Hong Kong (Hung)	0	0	0	0	2	0	2	X	X	X	4
Latvia (Barone) 🔨	3	0	5	1	0	3	0	X	X	X	12

==== Draw 3 ====
Tuesday, January 18, 19:00

Sheet A	1	2	3	4	5	6	7	8	9	10	Final
Norway (Rørvik) 🔨	X	X	X	X	X	X	X	X	X	X	W
Czech Republic (Baudyšová)	X	X	X	X	X	X	X	X	X	X	L

Sheet E	1	2	3	4	5	6	7	8	9	10	Final
Latvia (Barone) 🔨	0	1	0	1	2	0	0	0	X	X	4
Denmark (Dupont)	1	0	4	0	0	1	2	2	X	X	10

==== Draw 4 ====
Wednesday, January 19, 9:00

Sheet C	1	2	3	4	5	6	7	8	9	10	Final
Brazil (Oliveira) 🔨	1	0	0	0	1	0	2	0	0	X	4
Finland (Ahrenberg)	0	2	0	2	0	1	0	1	2	X	8

==== Draw 5 ====
Wednesday, January 19, 14:00

Sheet B	1	2	3	4	5	6	7	8	9	10	Final
Denmark (Dupont) 🔨	X	X	X	X	X	X	X	X	X	X	W
Czech Republic (Baudyšová)	X	X	X	X	X	X	X	X	X	X	L

Sheet D	1	2	3	4	5	6	7	8	9	10	Final
Norway (Rørvik) 🔨	2	0	3	0	3	0	0	4	X	X	12
Hong Kong (Hung)	0	1	0	1	0	0	2	0	X	X	4

==== Draw 6 ====
Wednesday, January 19, 19:00

Sheet A	1	2	3	4	5	6	7	8	9	10	Final
Latvia (Barone) 🔨	3	0	1	0	2	3	0	3	X	X	12
Finland (Ahrenberg)	0	0	0	2	0	0	1	0	X	X	3

==== Draw 7 ====
Thursday, January 20, 9:00

Sheet B	1	2	3	4	5	6	7	8	9	10	Final
Brazil (Oliveira)	0	1	0	1	0	0	0	X	X	X	2
Latvia (Barone) 🔨	2	0	2	0	2	3	3	X	X	X	12

Sheet C	1	2	3	4	5	6	7	8	9	10	Final
Denmark (Dupont) 🔨	0	1	0	0	0	1	1	0	1	X	4
Norway (Rørvik)	2	0	1	0	1	0	0	3	0	X	7

Sheet E	1	2	3	4	5	6	7	8	9	10	Final
Czech Republic (Baudyšová)	X	X	X	X	X	X	X	X	X	X	L
Hong Kong (Hung) 🔨	X	X	X	X	X	X	X	X	X	X	W

==== Draw 8 ====
Thursday, January 20, 15:00

Sheet B	1	2	3	4	5	6	7	8	9	10	11	Final
Hong Kong (Hung) 🔨	2	0	1	1	0	2	0	2	1	0	0	9
Finland (Ahrenberg)	0	3	0	0	2	0	2	0	0	2	2	11

Sheet E	1	2	3	4	5	6	7	8	9	10	Final
Norway (Rørvik) 🔨	2	0	0	3	3	0	1	0	X	X	9
Brazil (Oliveira)	0	0	1	0	0	2	0	2	X	X	5

==== Draw 9 ====
Friday, January 21, 9:00

Sheet C	1	2	3	4	5	6	7	8	9	10	Final
Czech Republic (Baudyšová)	X	X	X	X	X	X	X	X	X	X	L
Latvia (Barone) 🔨	X	X	X	X	X	X	X	X	X	X	W

Sheet D	1	2	3	4	5	6	7	8	9	10	Final
Finland (Ahrenberg)	1	0	1	0	0	2	0	0	0	X	4
Denmark (Dupont) 🔨	0	3	0	1	2	0	3	1	2	X	12

==== Draw 10 ====
Friday, January 21, 15:00

Sheet A	1	2	3	4	5	6	7	8	9	10	Final
Denmark (Dupont) 🔨	7	0	5	0	2	4	2	X	X	X	20
Hong Kong (Hung)	0	1	0	1	0	0	0	X	X	X	2

Sheet B	1	2	3	4	5	6	7	8	9	10	Final
Latvia (Barone)	0	2	0	0	0	1	0	1	0	X	4
Norway (Rørvik) 🔨	2	0	1	1	1	0	2	0	3	X	10

Sheet D	1	2	3	4	5	6	7	8	9	10	Final
Czech Republic (Baudyšová)	X	X	X	X	X	X	X	X	X	X	L
Brazil (Oliveira) 🔨	X	X	X	X	X	X	X	X	X	X	W

=== Playoffs ===
Qualification Game 1
1	Norway	6
2	Denmark	7

Qualification Game 2
1	Norway	8
3	Latvia	6

Qualify for World Championship
Denmark
Norway

==== Qualification Game 1 ====
Saturday, January 22, 9:00

Sheet C	1	2	3	4	5	6	7	8	9	10	Final
Norway (Rørvik) 🔨	0	0	1	0	3	0	1	0	0	1	6
Denmark (Dupont)	0	1	0	2	0	1	0	2	1	0	7

Winner qualifies for 2022 World Women's Curling Championship.

Loser drops to Qualification Game 2.

==== Qualification Game 2 ====
Saturday, January 22, 14:00

Sheet B	1	2	3	4	5	6	7	8	9	10	Final
Norway (Rørvik) 🔨	1	0	2	0	1	3	0	1	0	X	8
Latvia (Barone)	0	1	0	2	0	0	1	0	2	X	6

Winner qualifies for 2022 World Women's Curling Championship.
