= Pittsburgh Phantoms (RHI) =

US roller hockey team, June - August 1994

- City: Pittsburgh, Pennsylvania
- Founded: 1994
- Home arena: Pittsburgh Civic Arena
- Colors: Black, Purple, Orange, White
- Murphy Cups: None
- Conference Championships: None
- Division Championships: None

Franchise history
- Pittsburgh Phantoms (1994)

The Pittsburgh Phantoms were a professional roller hockey team based in Pittsburgh, Pennsylvania, United States that played in Roller Hockey International. The team got its name from the "Steel Phantom" rollercoaster, located at Kennywood Park, a theme park located in the suburb of West Mifflin, Pennsylvania. At the time of the team's inception the Phantom was the tallest and fastest steel rollercoaster in the world. The logo was heavily inspired by the roller coaster's logo seen at the entrance to the ride.

== History ==
The Phantoms played their first game on June 5, 1994. Their opponent was the New England Stingers whom they beat 10–5 in front of a crowd announced as 2,467 at the Cumberland County Civic Center; the first goal in franchise history was scored by Trevor Buchanan. Later that season they would move to the Civic Arena (Pittsburgh) to play, beating the Atlanta Fire Ants 10–9 in their first game in the arena.

The team also was part of the first professional hockey game that included two professional women's players. In July 1994, Erin Whitten for the Phantoms faced off against goaltender Manon Rhéaume who played for the New Jersey Rockin' Rollers. Whitten was also part of a game with the Toledo Storm when they beat Dayton, 6–5, on October 30, 1993, marking the first win by female professional player.

On August 25, 1994, the Civic Arena opened their roof when the Phantoms hosted the Minnesota Arctic Blast. It marked the first time the roof was opened for a professional hockey game. The team played the theme song from 2001: A Space Odyssey while the roof opened.

The team later folded a few months later.

== Jerseys ==
The white style jersey was originally intended to be the road jersey with "PITTSBURGH" above the Phantoms's logo. However, a last-minute decision by equipment manager Steve Latin made the white version as the home jersey, therefore the purple jersey was made the road jersey. Each jersey consisted of mesh material and was made by CCM. The logos on the shoulders and the front of the jersey were dyed into the material. The jersey numbers and player's names consisted of heat-sealed vinyl material. The CCM Roller Hockey International patch on rear hem and the KOHO patch on the front are fully embroidered patches. The jerseys did not have fightstraps and should have a hand-written number on the inside tag of the jersey. The captain and alternate captain designations were worn on the upper left front of the jersey.

== Hall of famers ==
- Bryan Trottier

== Former Penguins ==
- Alain Lemieux
- Bryan Trottier
- Warren Young

== 1994 Phantoms roster ==
- Jamie Adams
- Martin Bergeron
- Trevor Buchanan
- Scott Burfoot
- Eric Brule
- Mike Cavanaugh
- Glenn Clark – 'A'
- Bruce Coles
- Brian Cook
- Kip Guenther
- Alain Lemieux
- Marty McDonough (G)
- Kevin Meisner
- Alain Morrissette (G)
- Jim Peters
- Sylvain Rodrigue
- Bryan Trottier
- Jason Smith
- Erin Whitten (G)
- Andy White
- Jeff Whittle – 'C'
- George Wilcox
- Brock Woods
- Warren Young
