= 2023 World Men's Curling Championship =

2023 edition of the World Men's Curling Championship

- Host city: Ottawa, Ontario, Canada
- Arena: TD Place Arena
- Dates: April 1–9
- Attendance: 75,960
- Winner: Scotland
- Curling club: Gogar Park CC, Edinburgh
- Skip: Bruce Mouat
- Third: Grant Hardie
- Second: Bobby Lammie
- Lead: Hammy McMillan Jr.
- Alternate: Kyle Waddell
- Coach: Michael Goodfellow
- Finalist: Canada (Gushue)

The 2023 World Men's Curling Championship (branded as the 2023 BKT Tires & OK Tire World Men's Curling Championship for sponsorship reasons) was held from April 1 to 9 at TD Place in Ottawa, Ontario, Canada. Ottawa was selected as the host site in June 2022. It had originally been planned for the city to host the event in 2021, but the event was moved to the "Calgary bubble" due to the COVID-19 pandemic. This was the first time Ottawa hosted the men's Worlds.

The format for the Championship featured a thirteen team round robin. The top six teams qualified for the playoff round where the top two teams received a bye while the remaining four played the first round.

The event was expected to attract approximately 70,000 fans, which was ultimately exceeded. The Aberdeen Pavilion acted as the "patch" for the event, the site where fans gathered during the event.

The tournament marked the final major event for ice technician Dave Merklinger.

== Summary ==
Team Turkey, who were making their debut at the event were no-shows at the opening ceremonies, making an "inauspicious" start to the event. The team would later blame a miscommunication for their absence, believing that the ceremonies were to be held on April 2.

The 1993 World Men's Curling Championship winning Canadian team (Russ Howard, Glenn Howard, Wayne Middaugh and Peter Corner) were honoured in the opening ceremonies.

An ice storm hit Ottawa on April 5, knocking out power in various parts of the city, but not at TD Place. Despite the weather, crowds remained "decent". Rocks were re-textured prior to matches on the day, and Canada skip Brad Gushue indicated that the venue was cooler in the morning, but the ice held up. The most notable event on the 5th was in the draw 12 game between Sweden and Norway, where Swedish skip Niklas Edin made what many were calling one of the greatest or "craziest" shots in curling history, that has been dubbed a "shot heard around the curling world". Down by two in the tenth end, Edin had to throw a rock with an incredible amount of spin, making it curl enough to bump a guarded corner-frozen Norwegian stone at the perfect angle to avoid moving the Swedish rock it was frozen to, while also moving the Norwegian stone far enough to score two. A near-impossible shot, it could have only been made by throwing a "spinner," a rarely thrown shot in the sport. Usually a rock will rotate just a few times during its trajectory, but Edin's rock made over 53.5 rotations according to curling oddsmaker Matt Hall. Throwing a spinner is so rare, laughter could be heard at the arena when Edin released the rock. Edin was successful though, with his shooter rock being the second point, which was confirmed after a measurement. TSN commentator Russ Howard stated immediately after the bump: "That is the best shot I've ever seen in my life!" — World Curling Federation commentator Tyler George said "There's these moments in sports where sometimes the moment is bigger than the result of the game. I will remember that shot for as long as I live." Despite the shot, Team Sweden ended up losing the game in the extra end.

Turkey won their first ever game at the Men's World Championship in their draw 15 match against New Zealand, defeating the Kiwis 8–5. They followed that up with a second win in draw 16, defeating South Korea 8–3.

Following the round robin portion, the top six team made the playoffs. Switzerland earned the top seed with an 11–1 record, while Scotland earned the second seed with a 10–2 record. Both teams earned a bye to the semifinals. The third seed went to Norway (also 10–2), who played the six seeded Italians (8–4) in a qualification game, while the fourth seeded Canadians (9–3) played the number five ranked Swedes (also 9–3). The winners of the qualification games advanced to the semifinals.

In the qualification games, Canada easily dispatched Sweden 9–1, ending their reign as four-time defending World champions, while Italy eliminated Norway, 8–4. Canada then went on to defeat the number one seeded Swiss in the semifinals 7–5, while Italy lost to Scotland 8–9 in an extra end. Italy nearly won the game in the 10th, as with 12 seconds left on their game clock, skip Joël Retornaz nearly made a long split to score three, but one of their rocks landed a few millimetres from the house, which was confirmed after a measurement.

With their semifinal losses, Italy and Switzerland faced off for the bronze medal. In their match, Switzerland dominated. After leading 3–0 after three, the Swiss stole even more points, including a three-ender in the fifth after Italian skip Joël Retornaz took out his own stone. Italy finally scored in the sixth end, getting a deuce, but Switzerland scored three again in the seventh. Switzerland ended up winning the game 11–3.

In the final, Scotland easily defeated Canada 9–3. The Bruce Mouat rink, representing Scotland won their first World title, and the first since 2009 for their nation. It also completed the medal set for the Mouat team, which won a silver in 2021 and a bronze in 2019. The team struck first blood in the second end scoring a deuce, after Mouat made a double take out. This was followed by a steal of two in the third, when Canada skip Brad Gushue was heavy on a draw against three Scottish counters. This gave the Scots an early 4–0 lead, taking the partisan Canadian crowd out of the game. Scotland kept the pressure on in the fourth, forcing Gushue to hit for a single point. Another costly mistake by Gushue came in the fifth when he was heavy on a tap attempt, which was followed up by a Mouat draw for two to lead 6–1. Canada finally got a two-ender in the sixth, when Scotland played the end safe, with Mouat opting for an easier hit instead of a double. After a blanked seventh, Gushue made another mistake when he was not able to remove a Scottish stone from the house, allowing Mouat to make a hit for three. With the score now 9–3 for Scotland, Canada conceded the game, handing the World Championship to Mouat and company. The Scottish team were in near-perfect form, with all four members curling in the 90s, with their percentage as a team at 96. In total, 5,604 fans attended the final, bringing the total attendance for the week to 75,960.

== Qualification ==
Thirteen curling federations qualified to participate in the 2023 World Men's Curling Championship. This is the first World Men's Championship appearance for Turkey, being represented by skip Uğurcan Karagöz.

Means of Qualification	Vacancies	Qualified
Host Nation	1	Canada
2022 Pan Continental Curling Championships	4	South Korea; United States; Japan; New Zealand
2022 European Curling Championships	8	Scotland; Switzerland; Italy; Sweden; Norway; Turkey; Czech Republic; Germany
TOTAL	13	

=== Selection of national teams ===
Country	Means of Qualification
Canada	Winners of the 2023 Tim Hortons Brier
Czech Republic	Winners of the 2023 Czech Men's Curling Championship
Germany	Selected by national association
Italy	Selected by national association
Japan	Winners of the 2023 Japan Curling Championships
New Zealand	Selected by national association
Norway	Selected by national association
Scotland	Selected by national association
South Korea	Winners of the 2022 Korean Curling Championships
Sweden	Selected by national association
Switzerland	Winners of the 2023 Swiss Men's Curling Championship
Turkey	Selected by national association
United States	Winners of the 2023 United States Men's Curling Championship

== Teams ==
The teams were as follows:

Canada	Czech Republic	Germany	Italy	Japan
St. John's CC, St. John's Skip: Brad Gushue; Third: Mark Nichols; Second: E. J. Harnden; Lead: Geoff Walker; Alternate: Ryan Harnden	CC Zbraslav, Zbraslav & CC Dion, Prague Skip: Lukáš Klíma; Third: Marek Černovský; Second: Radek Boháč; Lead: Martin Jurík; Alternate: Lukáš Klípa	Baden Hills G&CC & CC Füssen, Füssen Skip: Sixten Totzek; Third: Klaudius Harsch; Second: Magnus Sutor; Lead: Dominik Greindl; Alternate: Marc Muskatewitz	Italian Air Force Skip: Joël Retornaz; Third: Amos Mosaner; Second: Sebastiano Arman; Lead: Mattia Giovanella	SC Karuizawa Club, Karuizawa Skip: Riku Yanagisawa; Third: Tsuyoshi Yamaguchi; Second: Takeru Yamamoto; Lead: Satoshi Koizumi; Alternate: Shingo Usui
New Zealand	Norway	Scotland	South Korea	Sweden
Maniota Curling, Naseby & Alexandria Curling Rink Skip: Anton Hood; Third: Ben Smith; Second: Brett Sargon; Lead: Hunter Walker; Alternate: Peter de Boer	Trondheim CK, Trondheim Skip: Magnus Ramsfjell; Third: Martin Sesaker; Second: Bendik Ramsfjell; Lead: Gaute Nepstad; Alternate: Wilhelm Næss	Gogar Park CC, Edinburgh Skip: Bruce Mouat; Third: Grant Hardie; Second: Bobby Lammie; Lead: Hammy McMillan Jr. Alternate: Kyle Waddell	Seoul Metropolitan Government, Seoul Skip: Jeong Byeong-jin; Third: Lee Jeong-jae; Second: Kim Min-woo; Lead: Kim Tae-hwan	Karlstads CK, Karlstad Skip: Niklas Edin; Third: Oskar Eriksson; Second: Rasmus Wranå; Lead: Christoffer Sundgren; Alternate: Daniel Magnusson
Switzerland	Turkey	United States		
CC Genève, Geneva Fourth: Benoît Schwarz; Skip: Yannick Schwaller; Second: Sven Michel; Lead: Pablo Lachat	Milli Piyango CA, Erzurum Skip: Uğurcan Karagöz; Third: Muhammet Haydar Demirel; Second: Muhammed Zeki Uçan; Lead: Orhun Yüce; Alternate: Faruk Kavaz	Duluth CC, Duluth & Madison CC, McFarland Skip: John Shuster; Third: Chris Plys; Second: Matt Hamilton; Lead: John Landsteiner; Alternate: Colin Hufman		

=== WCF ranking ===
Year to date World Curling Federation order of merit ranking for each team prior to the event. Rankings based on the 2022–23 season.

Nation (Skip)	Rank	Points
Sweden (Edin)	1	355.8
Italy (Retornaz)	3	319.8
Canada (Gushue)	4	315.8
Scotland (Mouat)	6	305.0
Switzerland (Schwaller)	7	287.5
Norway (Ramsfjell)	11	212.3
United States (Shuster)	15	169.5
Japan (Yanagisawa)	17	160.8
South Korea (Jeong)	33	115.1
Czech Republic (Klíma)	74	47.3
Germany (Totzek)	86	40.1
Turkey (Karagöz)	95	36.0
New Zealand (Hood)	188	11.1

== Round robin standings ==
Final Round Robin Standings

Key
Teams to Playoffs

Country	Skip	W	L	W–L	PF	PA	EW	EL	BE	SE	S%	DSC
Switzerland	Yannick Schwaller	11	1	–	94	57	49	43	10	9	87.2%	21.08
Scotland	Bruce Mouat	10	2	1–0	93	53	52	37	7	16	84.8%	24.24
Norway	Magnus Ramsfjell	10	2	0–1	83	67	51	40	9	14	84.6%	23.98
Canada	Brad Gushue	9	3	1–0	88	60	47	43	5	6	86.3%	19.70
Sweden	Niklas Edin	9	3	0–1	95	54	57	37	4	17	86.9%	17.33
Italy	Joël Retornaz	8	4	–	90	60	50	38	6	19	86.3%	16.80
Japan	Riku Yanagisawa	5	7	1–0	69	76	45	46	4	9	82.3%	45.60
United States	John Shuster	5	7	0–1	94	91	51	48	2	11	81.3%	35.18
Germany	Sixten Totzek	4	8	–	66	88	45	48	2	8	78.3%	45.55
Czech Republic	Lukáš Klíma	3	9	–	63	89	42	50	7	8	76.8%	33.04
Turkey	Uğurcan Karagöz	2	10	–	52	86	36	50	7	6	75.7%	40.76
South Korea	Jeong Byeong-jin	1	11	1–0	43	94	33	52	8	5	76.1%	50.25
New Zealand	Anton Hood	1	11	0–1	44	99	29	55	9	1	72.9%	51.83

Round Robin Summary Table
Pos.	Country	Canada	Czech Republic	Germany	Italy	Japan	New Zealand	Norway	Scotland	South Korea	Sweden	Switzerland	Turkey	United States	Record
4	Canada	—	8–3	9–4	10–6	6–3	8–2	6–8	3–6	9–4	8–5	3–8	9–5	9–6	9–3
10	Czech Republic	3–8	—	6–10	4–8	3–9	8–1	6–8	3–9	8–3	3–10	4–7	7–6	8–10	3–9
9	Germany	4–9	10–6	—	2–7	8–5	8–11	3–5	6–8	7–4	2–8	3–7	9–6	4–12	4–8
6	Italy	6–10	8–4	7–2	—	12–5	8–3	8–9	4–7	9–2	2–8	8–4	7–2	11–4	8–4
7	Japan	3–6	9–3	5–8	5–12	—	10–5	4–7	2–9	9–2	6–9	6–7	4–3	6–5	5–7
13	New Zealand	2–8	1–8	11–8	3–8	5–10	—	2–9	4–10	2–8	1–7	5–7	5–8	3–8	1–11
3	Norway	8–6	8–6	5–3	9–8	7–4	9–2	—	5–9	6–2	8–7	4–11	6–4	8–5	10–2
2	Scotland	6–3	9–3	8–6	7–4	9–2	10–4	9–5	—	9–3	4–7	4–7	8–1	10–8	10–2
12	South Korea	4–9	3–8	4–7	2–9	2–9	8–2	2–6	3–9	—	3–8	4–8	3–8	5–11	1–11
5	Sweden	5–8	10–3	8–2	8–2	9–6	7–1	7–8	7–4	8–3	—	5–8	10–3	11–6	9–3
1	Switzerland	8–3	7–4	7–3	4–8	7–6	7–5	11–4	7–4	8–4	8–5	—	8–2	12–9	11–1
11	Turkey	5–9	6–7	6–9	2–7	3–4	8–5	4–6	1–8	8–3	3–10	2–8	—	4–10	2–10
8	United States	6–9	10–8	12–4	4–11	5–6	8–3	5–8	8–10	11–5	6–11	9–12	10–4	—	5–7

== Round robin results ==
All draw times are listed in Eastern Time (UTC−04:00).

=== Draw 1 ===
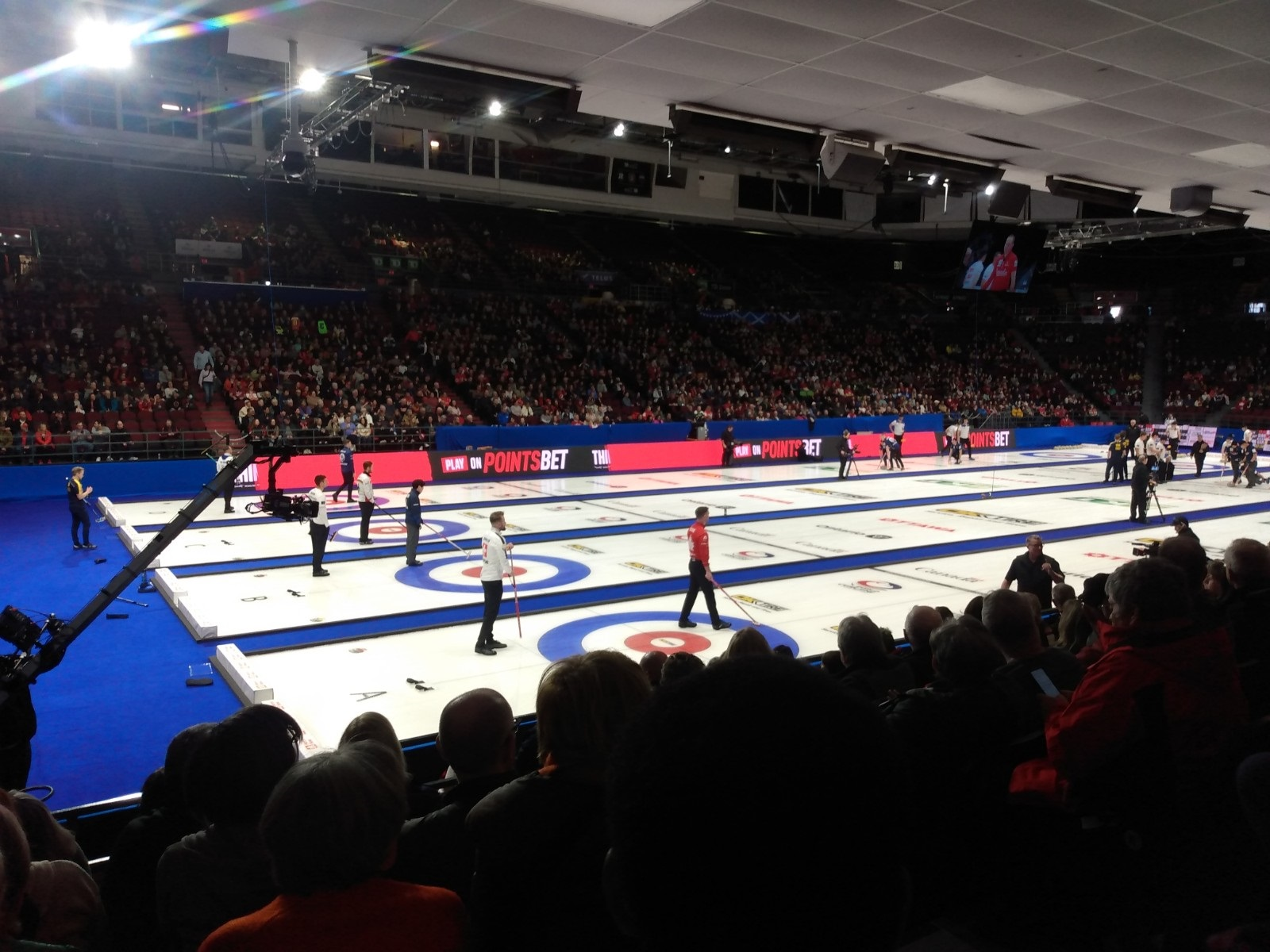
Draw 1

Saturday, April 1, 2:00 pm

Sheet A	1	2	3	4	5	6	7	8	9	10	Final
Canada (Gushue)	0	1	0	0	0	0	2	0	X	X	3
Switzerland (Schwaller) 🔨	2	0	2	1	2	0	0	1	X	X	8

Sheet B	1	2	3	4	5	6	7	8	9	10	Final
South Korea (Jeong)	0	0	1	1	1	0	2	3	X	X	8
New Zealand (Hood) 🔨	0	1	0	0	0	1	0	0	X	X	2

Sheet C	1	2	3	4	5	6	7	8	9	10	Final
Sweden (Edin) 🔨	4	0	2	1	0	1	X	X	X	X	8
Germany (Totzek)	0	1	0	0	1	0	X	X	X	X	2

Sheet D	1	2	3	4	5	6	7	8	9	10	Final
Scotland (Mouat)	0	0	0	3	0	0	1	1	0	2	7
Italy (Retornaz) 🔨	0	1	1	0	1	0	0	0	1	0	4

=== Draw 2 ===
Saturday, April 1, 7:00 pm

Sheet A	1	2	3	4	5	6	7	8	9	10	11	Final
Japan (Yanagisawa)	0	0	0	0	1	0	1	0	0	1	1	4
Turkey (Karagöz) 🔨	0	1	0	0	0	1	0	1	0	0	0	3

Sheet B	1	2	3	4	5	6	7	8	9	10	Final
Canada (Gushue) 🔨	2	0	0	2	1	0	3	0	2	X	10
Italy (Retornaz)	0	0	2	0	0	2	0	2	0	X	6

Sheet C	1	2	3	4	5	6	7	8	9	10	Final
United States (Shuster)	0	0	1	0	2	0	1	0	1	0	5
Norway (Ramsfjell) 🔨	1	1	0	3	0	0	0	2	0	1	8

Sheet D	1	2	3	4	5	6	7	8	9	10	Final
Czech Republic (Klíma) 🔨	2	0	3	1	0	0	2	X	X	X	8
New Zealand (Hood)	0	1	0	0	0	0	0	X	X	X	1

=== Draw 3 ===
Sunday, April 2, 9:00 am

Sheet A	1	2	3	4	5	6	7	8	9	10	Final
Norway (Ramsfjell) 🔨	0	2	0	0	2	1	1	0	X	X	6
South Korea (Jeong)	0	0	0	1	0	0	0	1	X	X	2

Sheet B	1	2	3	4	5	6	7	8	9	10	Final
Turkey (Karagöz)	0	0	0	0	0	1	X	X	X	X	1
Scotland (Mouat) 🔨	3	1	2	2	0	0	X	X	X	X	8

Sheet C	1	2	3	4	5	6	7	8	9	10	Final
Switzerland (Schwaller)	0	0	2	0	0	2	0	2	1	X	7
Czech Republic (Klíma) 🔨	0	1	0	1	1	0	1	0	0	X	4

Sheet D	1	2	3	4	5	6	7	8	9	10	Final
United States (Shuster)	0	0	2	0	0	2	0	2	0	X	6
Sweden (Edin) 🔨	2	0	0	3	2	0	2	0	2	X	11

=== Draw 4 ===
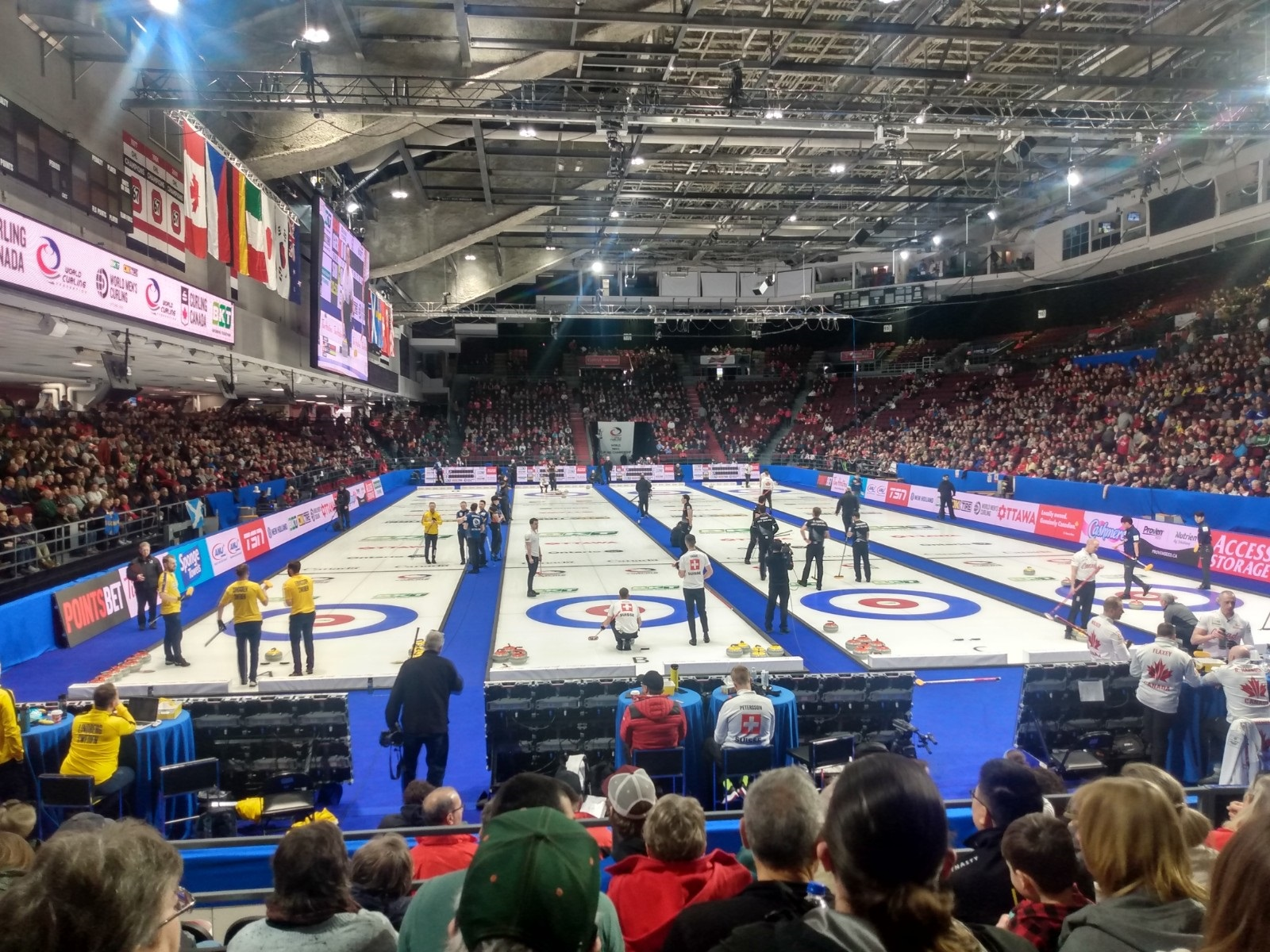
Draw 4

Sunday, April 2, 2:00 pm

Sheet A	1	2	3	4	5	6	7	8	9	10	Final
Scotland (Mouat)	0	0	1	0	2	0	0	1	0	X	4
Sweden (Edin) 🔨	0	2	0	1	0	0	1	0	3	X	7

Sheet B	1	2	3	4	5	6	7	8	9	10	Final
Germany (Totzek)	0	0	0	1	0	1	0	1	X	X	3
Switzerland (Schwaller) 🔨	0	0	2	0	3	0	2	0	X	X	7

Sheet C	1	2	3	4	5	6	7	8	9	10	Final
New Zealand (Hood)	0	0	1	0	0	1	0	X	X	X	2
Canada (Gushue) 🔨	2	1	0	2	0	0	3	X	X	X	8

Sheet D	1	2	3	4	5	6	7	8	9	10	Final
South Korea (Jeong) 🔨	1	0	0	0	1	0	0	0	X	X	2
Japan (Yanagisawa)	0	1	1	2	0	2	1	2	X	X	9

=== Draw 5 ===
Sunday, April 2, 7:00 pm

Sheet A	1	2	3	4	5	6	7	8	9	10	Final
Czech Republic (Klíma) 🔨	1	0	0	1	0	2	0	2	0	X	6
Germany (Totzek)	0	3	2	0	1	0	1	0	3	X	10

Sheet B	1	2	3	4	5	6	7	8	9	10	Final
Japan (Yanagisawa)	0	1	1	0	1	0	3	0	0	0	6
United States (Shuster) 🔨	1	0	0	0	0	1	0	1	1	1	5

Sheet C	1	2	3	4	5	6	7	8	9	10	Final
Italy (Retornaz) 🔨	1	1	0	0	1	0	2	1	1	X	7
Turkey (Karagöz)	0	0	1	0	0	1	0	0	0	X	2

Sheet D	1	2	3	4	5	6	7	8	9	10	Final
Norway (Ramsfjell)	0	0	2	0	0	1	1	0	2	2	8
Canada (Gushue) 🔨	2	2	0	1	0	0	0	1	0	0	6

=== Draw 6 ===
Monday, April 3, 9:00 am

Sheet A	1	2	3	4	5	6	7	8	9	10	Final
Switzerland (Schwaller) 🔨	0	0	3	0	0	1	0	0	0	0	4
Italy (Retornaz)	0	1	0	2	0	0	2	1	1	1	8

Sheet B	1	2	3	4	5	6	7	8	9	10	Final
Sweden (Edin)	0	1	0	1	0	0	3	1	2	X	8
South Korea (Jeong) 🔨	1	0	1	0	0	1	0	0	0	X	3

Sheet C	1	2	3	4	5	6	7	8	9	10	Final
Czech Republic (Klíma) 🔨	1	0	2	0	1	0	3	0	0	1	8
United States (Shuster)	0	3	0	2	0	1	0	4	0	0	10

=== Draw 7 ===
Monday, April 3, 2:00 pm

Sheet A	1	2	3	4	5	6	7	8	9	10	Final
Sweden (Edin) 🔨	2	0	3	2	1	0	2	X	X	X	10
Turkey (Karagöz)	0	1	0	0	0	2	0	X	X	X	3

Sheet B	1	2	3	4	5	6	7	8	9	10	Final
New Zealand (Hood)	0	0	1	0	1	0	0	0	X	X	2
Norway (Ramsfjell) 🔨	0	1	0	3	0	0	2	3	X	X	9

Sheet C	1	2	3	4	5	6	7	8	9	10	Final
Canada (Gushue) 🔨	1	0	2	0	0	0	2	0	1	X	6
Japan (Yanagisawa)	0	1	0	1	0	0	0	1	0	X	3

Sheet D	1	2	3	4	5	6	7	8	9	10	Final
Germany (Totzek)	0	0	0	0	2	1	0	2	0	1	6
Scotland (Mouat) 🔨	2	1	1	1	0	0	1	0	2	0	8

=== Draw 8 ===
Monday, April 3, 7:00 pm

Sheet A	1	2	3	4	5	6	7	8	9	10	Final
United States (Shuster)	0	4	2	3	0	2	X	X	X	X	11
South Korea (Jeong) 🔨	2	0	0	0	3	0	X	X	X	X	5

Sheet B	1	2	3	4	5	6	7	8	9	10	Final
Italy (Retornaz) 🔨	1	3	2	0	1	0	X	X	X	X	7
Germany (Totzek)	0	0	0	1	0	1	X	X	X	X	2

Sheet C	1	2	3	4	5	6	7	8	9	10	Final
Norway (Ramsfjell)	0	0	2	0	0	2	0	X	X	X	4
Switzerland (Schwaller) 🔨	0	3	0	3	2	0	3	X	X	X	11

Sheet D	1	2	3	4	5	6	7	8	9	10	11	Final
Turkey (Karagöz) 🔨	1	2	0	0	0	1	0	0	0	2	0	6
Czech Republic (Klíma)	0	0	0	0	1	0	2	2	1	0	1	7

=== Draw 9 ===
Tuesday, April 4, 9:00 am

Sheet B	1	2	3	4	5	6	7	8	9	10	Final
South Korea (Jeong)	0	0	1	0	1	0	1	1	0	0	4
Switzerland (Schwaller) 🔨	0	3	0	1	0	0	0	0	2	2	8

Sheet C	1	2	3	4	5	6	7	8	9	10	Final
Scotland (Mouat) 🔨	2	0	2	0	0	2	0	0	2	2	10
United States (Shuster)	0	1	0	3	1	0	2	1	0	0	8

Sheet D	1	2	3	4	5	6	7	8	9	10	Final
Japan (Yanagisawa) 🔨	3	0	4	0	3	0	X	X	X	X	10
New Zealand (Hood)	0	1	0	1	0	3	X	X	X	X	5

=== Draw 10 ===
Tuesday, April 4, 2:00 pm

Sheet A	1	2	3	4	5	6	7	8	9	10	Final
Turkey (Karagöz)	0	5	0	0	0	1	0	0	0	0	6
Germany (Totzek) 🔨	2	0	1	0	1	0	2	1	0	2	9

Sheet B	1	2	3	4	5	6	7	8	9	10	Final
Czech Republic (Klíma)	0	1	0	0	1	0	1	0	X	X	3
Canada (Gushue) 🔨	1	0	2	3	0	1	0	1	X	X	8

Sheet C	1	2	3	4	5	6	7	8	9	10	Final
Japan (Yanagisawa)	0	1	0	2	0	0	2	0	1	0	6
Sweden (Edin) 🔨	2	0	1	0	3	1	0	1	0	1	9

Sheet D	1	2	3	4	5	6	7	8	9	10	11	Final
Italy (Retornaz) 🔨	0	2	0	0	3	0	1	0	1	1	0	8
Norway (Ramsfjell)	2	0	2	0	0	3	0	1	0	0	1	9

=== Draw 11 ===
Tuesday, April 4, 7:00 pm

Sheet A	1	2	3	4	5	6	7	8	9	10	Final
New Zealand (Hood)	0	0	1	0	0	0	0	2	0	X	3
Italy (Retornaz) 🔨	1	0	0	0	4	0	0	0	3	X	8

Sheet B	1	2	3	4	5	6	7	8	9	10	Final
United States (Shuster) 🔨	2	0	3	0	2	0	2	1	X	X	10
Turkey (Karagöz)	0	1	0	2	0	1	0	0	X	X	4

Sheet C	1	2	3	4	5	6	7	8	9	10	Final
South Korea (Jeong) 🔨	0	0	1	0	0	0	2	0	X	X	3
Czech Republic (Klíma)	1	1	0	2	1	0	0	3	X	X	8

Sheet D	1	2	3	4	5	6	7	8	9	10	Final
Switzerland (Schwaller) 🔨	2	0	1	0	0	0	1	0	3	X	7
Scotland (Mouat)	0	2	0	0	0	1	0	1	0	X	4

=== Draw 12 ===
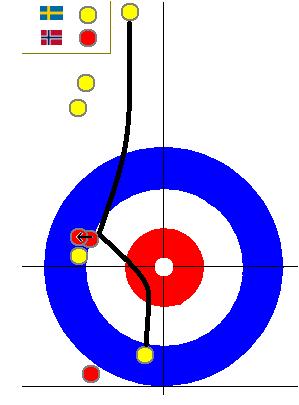
Niklas Edin was faced with an incredibly difficult shot in the 10th end to score two and force an extra end against Norway. To make the shot, Edin had to throw the stone with an excessive amount of rotation to bump a frozen Norwegian rock leftward without displacing his Swedish rock too far, and then holding the shooter to count as the second point. After making the shot, there was a measurement to confirm Sweden had scored two.

Wednesday, April 5, 9:00 am

Sheet A	1	2	3	4	5	6	7	8	9	10	11	Final
Norway (Ramsfjell) 🔨	1	0	0	1	0	1	0	1	3	0	1	8
Sweden (Edin)	0	2	1	0	1	0	1	0	0	2	0	7

Sheet B	1	2	3	4	5	6	7	8	9	10	Final
Scotland (Mouat) 🔨	1	1	1	1	0	5	X	X	X	X	9
Japan (Yanagisawa)	0	0	0	0	2	0	X	X	X	X	2

Sheet C	1	2	3	4	5	6	7	8	9	10	Final
Germany (Totzek)	0	1	0	1	2	0	2	2	0	0	8
New Zealand (Hood) 🔨	3	0	1	0	0	2	0	0	2	3	11

Sheet D	1	2	3	4	5	6	7	8	9	10	Final
Canada (Gushue)	0	0	1	1	0	3	0	4	X	X	9
South Korea (Jeong) 🔨	0	1	0	0	1	0	2	0	X	X	4

=== Draw 13 ===
Wednesday, April 5, 2:00 pm

Sheet A	1	2	3	4	5	6	7	8	9	10	Final
Czech Republic (Klíma)	0	0	0	1	0	2	0	0	X	X	3
Japan (Yanagisawa) 🔨	3	0	0	0	1	0	2	3	X	X	9

Sheet B	1	2	3	4	5	6	7	8	9	10	Final
Norway (Ramsfjell) 🔨	0	1	0	0	0	2	0	2	0	X	5
Germany (Totzek)	0	0	0	1	0	0	1	0	1	X	3

Sheet C	1	2	3	4	5	6	7	8	9	10	Final
Turkey (Karagöz)	0	1	0	0	1	0	X	X	X	X	2
Switzerland (Schwaller) 🔨	3	0	3	2	0	0	X	X	X	X	8

Sheet D	1	2	3	4	5	6	7	8	9	10	Final
Italy (Retornaz)	0	2	3	3	0	0	3	X	X	X	11
United States (Shuster) 🔨	1	0	0	0	3	0	0	X	X	X	4

=== Draw 14 ===
Wednesday, April 5, 7:00 pm

Sheet A	1	2	3	4	5	6	7	8	9	10	Final
South Korea (Jeong) 🔨	0	1	0	1	0	1	0	X	X	X	3
Scotland (Mouat)	0	0	5	0	2	0	2	X	X	X	9

Sheet B	1	2	3	4	5	6	7	8	9	10	Final
Switzerland (Schwaller) 🔨	1	0	1	1	1	0	2	0	0	1	7
New Zealand (Hood)	0	1	0	0	0	1	0	0	3	0	5

Sheet C	1	2	3	4	5	6	7	8	9	10	Final
United States (Shuster)	0	0	2	0	1	0	2	0	1	X	6
Canada (Gushue) 🔨	0	3	0	2	0	2	0	2	0	X	9

Sheet D	1	2	3	4	5	6	7	8	9	10	Final
Sweden (Edin) 🔨	1	0	3	0	3	0	3	X	X	X	10
Czech Republic (Klíma)	0	1	0	1	0	1	0	X	X	X	3

=== Draw 15 ===
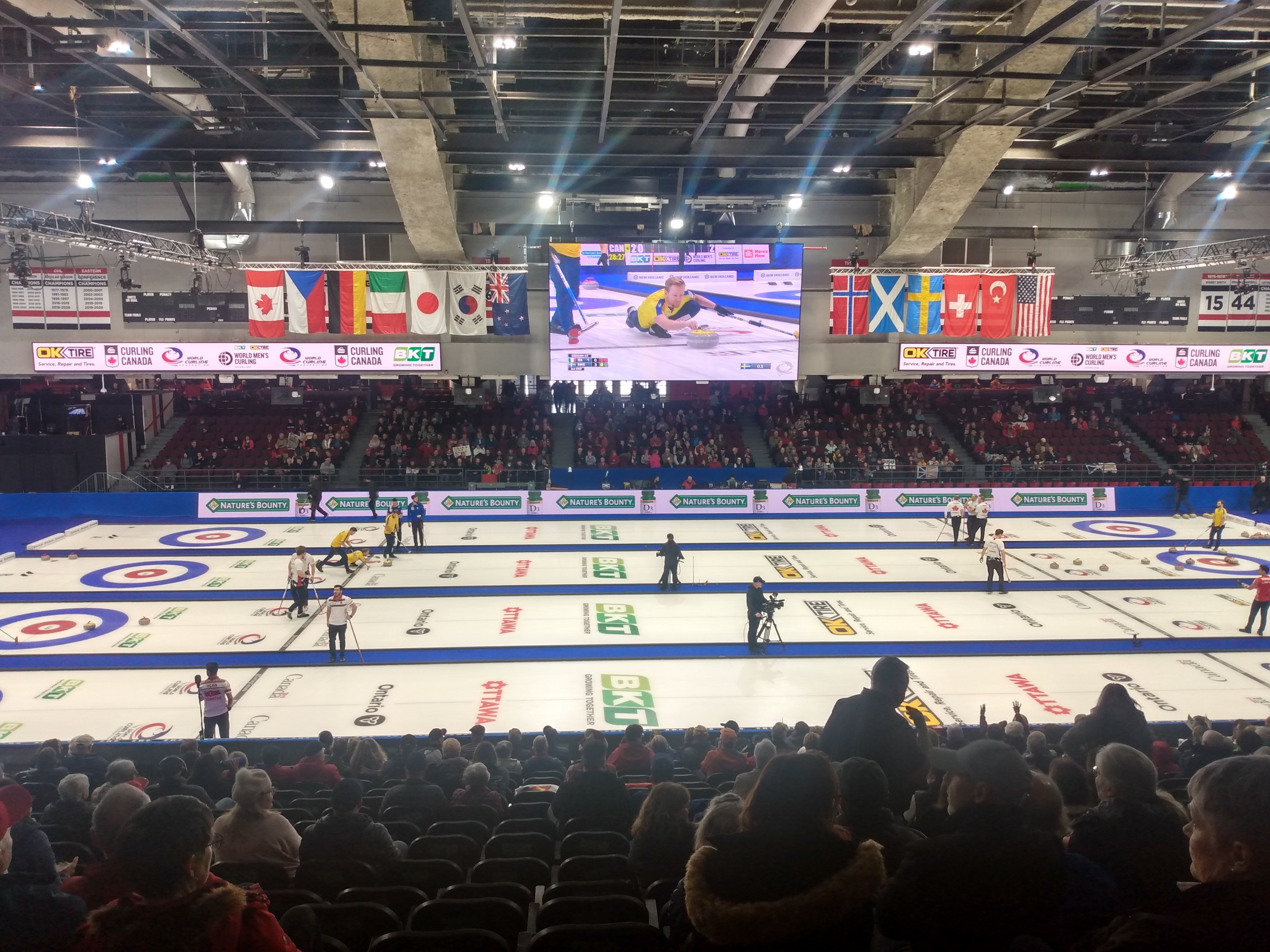
Draw 15

Thursday, April 6, 9:00 am

Sheet A	1	2	3	4	5	6	7	8	9	10	Final
Germany (Totzek)	0	0	1	0	1	0	0	2	0	X	4
Canada (Gushue) 🔨	2	0	0	2	0	2	1	0	2	X	9

Sheet B	1	2	3	4	5	6	7	8	9	10	Final
Italy (Retornaz) 🔨	0	0	0	0	1	1	0	X	X	X	2
Sweden (Edin)	2	1	2	1	0	0	2	X	X	X	8

Sheet C	1	2	3	4	5	6	7	8	9	10	Final
Japan (Yanagisawa) 🔨	0	1	0	0	0	1	0	2	X	X	4
Norway (Ramsfjell)	3	0	0	1	1	0	2	0	X	X	7

Sheet D	1	2	3	4	5	6	7	8	9	10	Final
New Zealand (Hood)	0	3	0	0	0	0	2	0	X	X	5
Turkey (Karagöz) 🔨	1	0	2	1	0	3	0	1	X	X	8

=== Draw 16 ===
Thursday, April 6, 2:00 pm

Sheet A	1	2	3	4	5	6	7	8	9	10	Final
Switzerland (Schwaller)	0	1	0	3	0	2	0	2	0	4	12
United States (Shuster) 🔨	1	0	2	0	2	0	1	0	3	0	9

Sheet B	1	2	3	4	5	6	7	8	9	10	Final
Turkey (Karagöz) 🔨	2	1	2	0	1	1	0	1	X	X	8
South Korea (Jeong)	0	0	0	2	0	0	1	0	X	X	3

Sheet C	1	2	3	4	5	6	7	8	9	10	Final
Czech Republic (Klíma) 🔨	0	2	0	1	0	0	0	1	X	X	4
Italy (Retornaz)	1	0	2	0	2	2	1	0	X	X	8

Sheet D	1	2	3	4	5	6	7	8	9	10	Final
Scotland (Mouat) 🔨	0	3	0	0	1	0	2	0	3	X	9
Norway (Ramsfjell)	0	0	2	0	0	1	0	2	0	X	5

=== Draw 17 ===
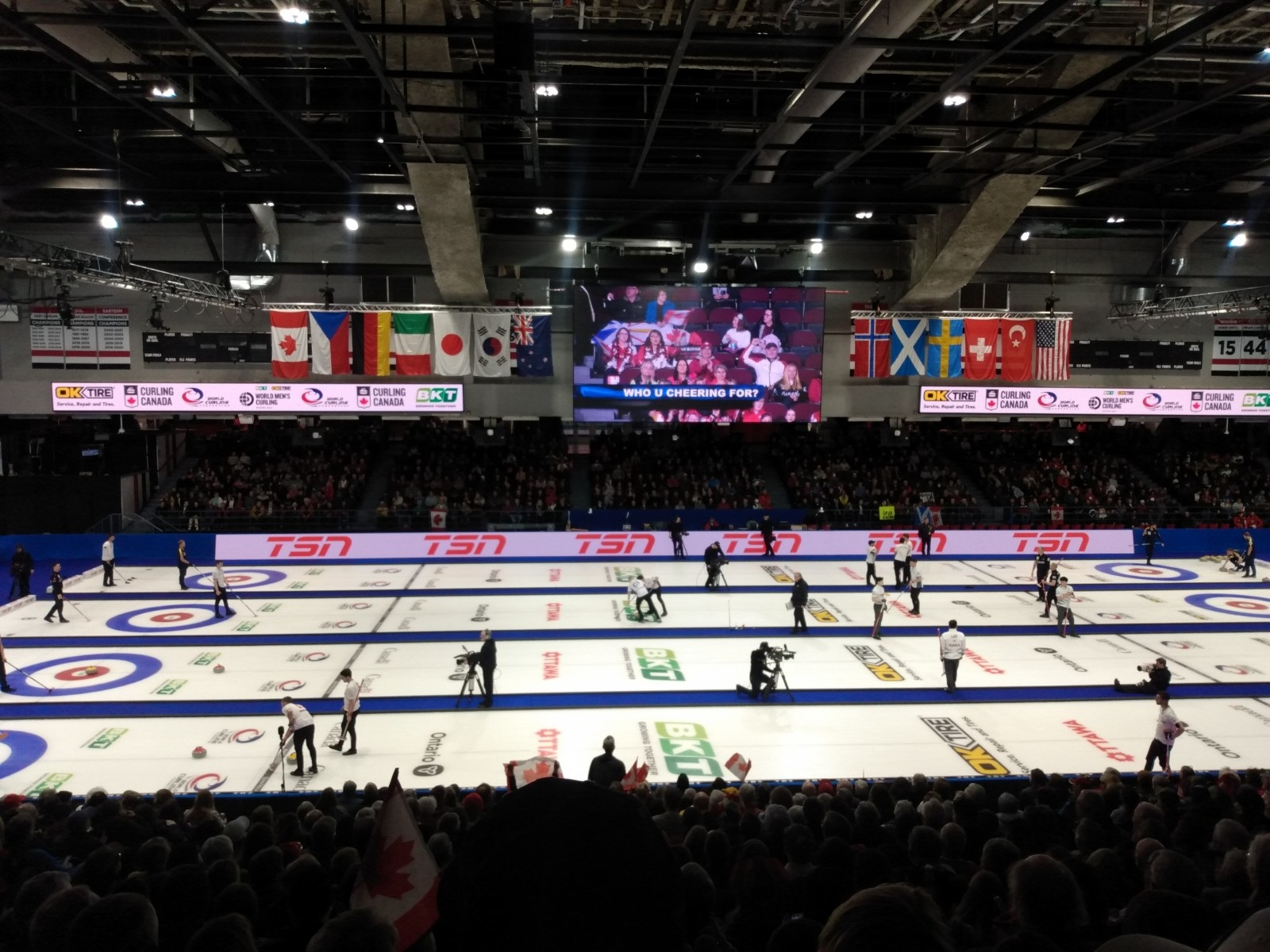
Draw 17

Thursday, April 6, 7:00 pm

Sheet A	1	2	3	4	5	6	7	8	9	10	Final
Sweden (Edin) 🔨	1	0	0	1	1	1	1	2	X	X	7
New Zealand (Hood)	0	1	0	0	0	0	0	0	X	X	1

Sheet B	1	2	3	4	5	6	7	8	9	10	Final
Canada (Gushue)	0	1	0	0	1	0	1	0	0	X	3
Scotland (Mouat) 🔨	1	0	2	0	0	1	0	0	2	X	6

Sheet C	1	2	3	4	5	6	7	8	9	10	Final
Germany (Totzek) 🔨	1	0	1	0	1	0	2	0	2	X	7
South Korea (Jeong)	0	1	0	0	0	1	0	2	0	X	4

Sheet D	1	2	3	4	5	6	7	8	9	10	Final
Japan (Yanagisawa) 🔨	1	0	0	1	0	1	0	2	1	0	6
Switzerland (Schwaller)	0	0	1	0	3	0	1	0	0	2	7

=== Draw 18 ===
Friday, April 7, 9:00 am

Sheet A	1	2	3	4	5	6	7	8	9	10	Final
Italy (Retornaz)	0	4	0	3	0	2	0	3	X	X	12
Japan (Yanagisawa) 🔨	1	0	1	0	1	0	2	0	X	X	5

Sheet B	1	2	3	4	5	6	7	8	9	10	Final
Norway (Ramsfjell) 🔨	2	1	0	1	0	2	1	0	1	X	8
Czech Republic (Klíma)	0	0	4	0	2	0	0	0	0	X	6

Sheet C	1	2	3	4	5	6	7	8	9	10	Final
Canada (Gushue) 🔨	2	0	1	0	4	0	2	0	X	X	9
Turkey (Karagöz)	0	1	0	2	0	1	0	1	X	X	5

Sheet D	1	2	3	4	5	6	7	8	9	10	Final
United States (Shuster) 🔨	1	0	3	1	0	2	0	5	X	X	12
Germany (Totzek)	0	1	0	0	2	0	1	0	X	X	4

=== Draw 19 ===
Friday, April 7, 2:00 pm

Sheet A	1	2	3	4	5	6	7	8	9	10	Final
Scotland (Mouat) 🔨	1	2	1	0	2	1	0	2	X	X	9
Czech Republic (Klíma)	0	0	0	2	0	0	1	0	X	X	3

Sheet B	1	2	3	4	5	6	7	8	9	10	Final
New Zealand (Hood) 🔨	1	0	0	1	0	1	0	0	X	X	3
United States (Shuster)	0	1	1	0	1	0	3	2	X	X	8

Sheet C	1	2	3	4	5	6	7	8	9	10	Final
Switzerland (Schwaller) 🔨	1	0	1	0	1	0	0	0	3	2	8
Sweden (Edin)	0	1	0	1	0	2	0	1	0	0	5

Sheet D	1	2	3	4	5	6	7	8	9	10	Final
South Korea (Jeong) 🔨	0	1	0	1	0	0	0	0	X	X	2
Italy (Retornaz)	0	0	3	0	2	0	2	2	X	X	9

=== Draw 20 ===
Friday, April 7, 7:00 pm

Sheet A	1	2	3	4	5	6	7	8	9	10	Final
Turkey (Karagöz)	0	0	3	0	0	0	0	1	0	0	4
Norway (Ramsfjell) 🔨	2	0	0	0	1	0	0	0	2	1	6

Sheet B	1	2	3	4	5	6	7	8	9	10	Final
Germany (Totzek) 🔨	1	0	2	0	2	0	3	0	0	X	8
Japan (Yanagisawa)	0	1	0	1	0	2	0	0	1	X	5

Sheet C	1	2	3	4	5	6	7	8	9	10	Final
New Zealand (Hood) 🔨	1	0	0	2	0	1	0	0	0	X	4
Scotland (Mouat)	0	3	1	0	1	0	0	2	3	X	10

Sheet D	1	2	3	4	5	6	7	8	9	10	Final
Sweden (Edin) 🔨	2	0	0	1	0	1	0	1	X	X	5
Canada (Gushue)	0	1	0	0	4	0	3	0	X	X	8

== Playoffs ==
Qualification games
4	Canada	9
5	Sweden	1
3	Norway	4
6	Italy	8

Semifinals
1	Switzerland	5
4	Canada	7
2	Scotland	9
6	Italy	8

Final
4	Canada	3
2	Scotland	9
Bronze medal game
1	Switzerland	11
6	Italy	3

=== Qualification Games ===
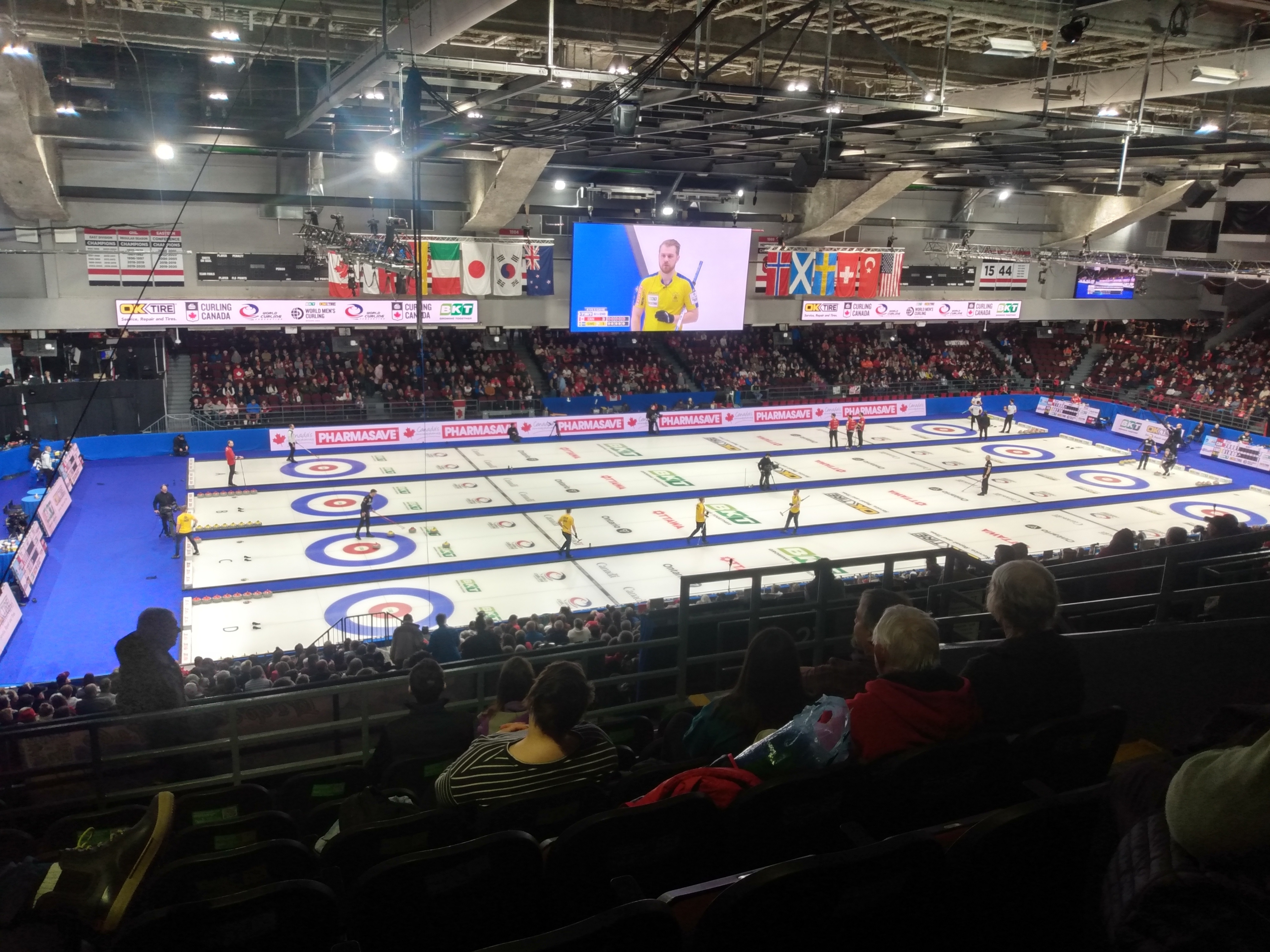
Qualification Games

Saturday, April 8, 2:00 pm

Sheet A	1	2	3	4	5	6	7	8	9	10	Final
Norway (Ramsfjell) 🔨	1	1	0	0	0	0	0	2	0	X	4
Italy (Retornaz)	0	0	2	2	0	1	1	0	2	X	8

Player percentages
Norway		Italy	
Gaute Nepstad	89%	Mattia Giovanella	93%
Bendik Ramsfjell	72%	Sebastiano Arman	72%
Martin Sesaker	79%	Amos Mosaner	89%
Magnus Ramsfjell	72%	Joël Retornaz	85%
Total	78%	Total	85%

Sheet C	1	2	3	4	5	6	7	8	9	10	Final
Canada (Gushue) 🔨	2	0	0	0	1	1	3	2	X	X	9
Sweden (Edin)	0	1	0	0	0	0	0	0	X	X	1

Player percentages
Canada		Sweden	
Geoff Walker	98%	Christoffer Sundgren	98%
E. J. Harnden	81%	Rasmus Wranå	80%
Mark Nichols	92%	Oskar Eriksson	77%
Brad Gushue	92%	Niklas Edin	69%
Total	91%	Total	81%

=== Semifinals ===
Saturday, April 8, 7:00 pm

Sheet A	1	2	3	4	5	6	7	8	9	10	Final
Switzerland (Schwaller) 🔨	0	1	0	1	0	1	0	2	0	0	5
Canada (Gushue)	1	0	1	0	1	0	2	0	0	2	7

Player percentages
Switzerland		Canada	
Pablo Lachat	89%	Geoff Walker	91%
Sven Michel	81%	E. J. Harnden	93%
Yannick Schwaller	86%	Mark Nichols	94%
Benoît Schwarz	80%	Brad Gushue	95%
Total	84%	Total	93%

Sheet C	1	2	3	4	5	6	7	8	9	10	11	Final
Scotland (Mouat) 🔨	1	0	1	0	2	0	2	0	2	0	1	9
Italy (Retornaz)	0	2	0	2	0	1	0	1	0	2	0	8

Player percentages
Scotland		Italy	
Hammy McMillan Jr.	95%	Mattia Giovanella	91%
Bobby Lammie	81%	Sebastiano Arman	83%
Grant Hardie	86%	Amos Mosaner	89%
Bruce Mouat	81%	Joël Retornaz	82%
Total	86%	Total	86%

=== Bronze medal game ===
Sunday, April 9, 11:00 am

Sheet B	1	2	3	4	5	6	7	8	9	10	Final
Switzerland (Schwaller) 🔨	0	2	1	2	3	0	3	0	X	X	11
Italy (Retornaz)	0	0	0	0	0	2	0	1	X	X	3

Player percentages
Switzerland		Italy	
Pablo Lachat	83%	Mattia Giovanella	92%
Sven Michel	80%	Sebastiano Arman	78%
Yannick Schwaller	98%	Amos Mosaner	77%
Benoît Schwarz	88%	Joël Retornaz	52%
Total	87%	Total	75%

=== Final ===
Sunday, April 9, 4:00 pm

Sheet B	1	2	3	4	5	6	7	8	9	10	Final
Canada (Gushue)	0	0	0	1	0	2	0	0	X	X	3
Scotland (Mouat) 🔨	0	2	2	0	2	0	0	3	X	X	9

Player percentages
Canada		Scotland	
Geoff Walker	97%	Hammy McMillan Jr.	97%
E. J. Harnden	92%	Bobby Lammie	94%
Mark Nichols	81%	Grant Hardie	98%
Brad Gushue	78%	Bruce Mouat	97%
Total	87%	Total	96%

== Statistics ==
=== Player percentages ===
Final Round Robin Percentages

Key
All-Star Team

Leads	%
(Canada) Geoff Walker	92.0
(United States) Colin Hufman (Note: Includes one game throwing second rocks; Played in five games)	89.6
(Scotland) Hammy McMillan Jr.	89.3
(Sweden) Christoffer Sundgren	89.3
(Norway) Gaute Nepstad	88.0
(Italy) Mattia Giovanella	87.9
(South Korea) Kim Tae-hwan	86.9
(New Zealand) Hunter Walker	86.6
(United States) John Landsteiner	86.5
(Switzerland) Pablo Lachat	86.1
(Japan) Satoshi Koizumi	85.6
(Germany) Dominik Greindl	85.1
(Turkey) Orhun Yüce	80.1
(Czech Republic) Martin Jurík (Note: Includes one game throwing second rocks)	79.1
(Czech Republic) Lukáš Klípa (Note: Played in three games)	75.0

Seconds	%
(Sweden) Rasmus Wranå	89.7
(Switzerland) Sven Michel	86.2
(Italy) Sebastiano Arman	86.1
(Norway) Bendik Ramsfjell	84.8
(Japan) Takeru Yamamoto	81.1
(Canada) E. J. Harnden	80.8
(United States) Matt Hamilton	79.5
(Scotland) Bobby Lammie	79.4
(Turkey) Muhammed Zeki Uçan	78.7
(Czech Republic) Radek Boháč	76.3
(South Korea) Kim Min-woo	74.7
(Germany) Magnus Sutor	74.0
(New Zealand) Brett Sargon	70.6
(Turkey) Faruk Kavaz (Note: Includes one game throwing lead rocks; Played in four games)	63.1

Thirds	%
(Switzerland) Yannick Schwaller (Skip)	90.5
(Scotland) Grant Hardie	87.0
(Italy) Amos Mosaner	86.8
(Canada) Mark Nichols	84.9
(Sweden) Oskar Eriksson	83.7
(Japan) Tsuyoshi Yamaguchi	83.1
(Norway) Martin Sesaker	82.5
(Czech Republic) Marek Černovský	79.7
(Turkey) Muhammet Haydar Demirel	79.2
(United States) Chris Plys	78.5
(Germany) Klaudius Harsch	78.2
(South Korea) Lee Jeong-jae	73.6
(New Zealand) Ben Smith	67.9

Skips	%
(Canada) Brad Gushue	87.6
(Switzerland) Benoît Schwarz (Fourth)	86.1
(Sweden) Niklas Edin	85.1
(Italy) Joël Retornaz	84.5
(Scotland) Bruce Mouat	83.8
(Norway) Magnus Ramsfjell	83.1
(Japan) Riku Yanagisawa	79.6
(United States) John Shuster	78.7
(Germany) Sixten Totzek	75.7
(Czech Republic) Lukáš Klíma	72.4
(South Korea) Jeong Byeong-jin	69.2
(Turkey) Uğurcan Karagöz	68.1
(New Zealand) Anton Hood	66.5

=== Perfect games ===
Minimum 10 shots thrown

Player	Team	Position	Shots	Opponent
Grant Hardie	Scotland	Third	11	Turkey
Tsuyoshi Yamaguchi	Japan	Third	12	New Zealand
Benoît Schwarz	Switzerland	Fourth	12	Turkey
Christoffer Sundgren	Sweden	Lead	14	Czech Republic

== Awards ==
The awards and all-star team are as follows:

All-Star Team

- Skip: Brad Gushue, Canada
- Third: Yannick Schwaller, Switzerland (Skip)
- Second: Rasmus Wranå, Sweden
- Lead: Geoff Walker, Canada

Collie Campbell Memorial Award

- Anton Hood, New Zealand

== Final standings ==
Place	Team
1st place, gold medalist(s)	Scotland
2nd place, silver medalist(s)	Canada
3rd place, bronze medalist(s)	Switzerland
4	Italy
5	Norway
5	Sweden
7	Japan
8	United States
9	Germany
10	Czech Republic
11	Turkey
12	South Korea
13	New Zealand

Based on this year's final standings, the 2023 European Curling Championships will serve as 13th qualification spot at next year's World Men's Curling Championship.

== Broadcasters ==
Some of the official broadcasters of the event are as follows:

Country	Network
Canada	TSN
Europe	EuroSport
Japan	NHK
South Korea	JTBC
Sweden	SVT
Switzerland	SSR
