= Orhun Yüce =

Turkish curler

- Curler
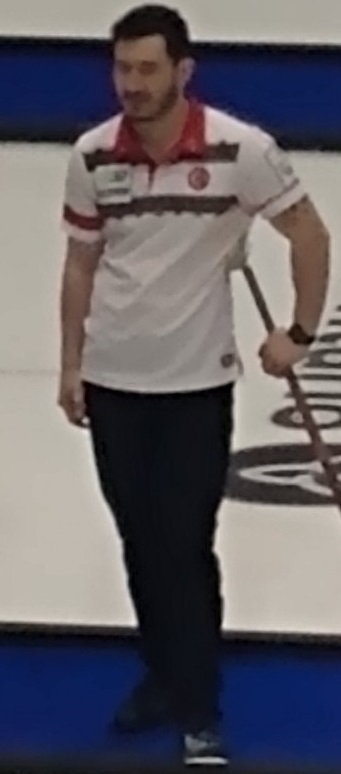
- Born: August 25, 1998 (age 28); Erzurum, Turkey

Team
- Curling club: Milli Piyango CA, Erzurum
- Skip: Uğurcan Karagöz
- Third: Muhammet Haydar Demirel
- Second: Muhammed Zeki Uçan
- Lead: Orhun Yüce
- Alternate: Faruk Kavaz

Curling career
- Member Association: Turkey
- World Championship: 1 (2023)
- European Championship: 4 (2019, 2021, 2022, 2023)

Orhun Yüce (born August 25, 1998) is a Turkish curler from Erzurum. He currently plays lead on the Turkish National Men's Curling Team skipped by Uğurcan Karagöz.

== Career ==
Yüce made his international début at the 2017 World Mixed Curling Championship playing lead on the Turkish team, skipped by Alican Karataş. The team finished pool play with a 5–1 record. This put them into the playoffs, where they beat Hungary in the round of 16, but lost to Norway in the quarterfinals.

Yüce joined the Turkish men's team (skipped by Uğurcan Karagöz) in 2019, making his début for the national team at the 2019 European Curling Championships, playing in the "B" division. The team finished pool play with a 6–1 record, then beat Spain before losing to the Czech Republic in the playoffs.

At the same time he was on the men's team, Yüce was also a member of the Turkish junior men's team, playing in one tournament with the team, the 2019 World Junior-B Curling Championships. Yüce played third on the team, which was skipped by Oğuzhan Karakurt. The team finished with a 5–2 record, but lost in the quarterfinals, to Italy.

Following the abbreviated 2020–21 curling season which was mostly cancelled due to the COVID-19 pandemic, the Turkish men's team's next major event was the 2021 Pre-Olympic Qualification Event played at home in Erzurum, in an attempt to qualify Turkey for the Olympic Qualification Event. The team, skipped by Karagöz made it to the qualification final, where they lost to Finland. The team then played in 2021 European Curling Championships, where Turkey was playing in the "B" event again. The team had a strong event, finishing 6–1 in pool play, in first place. They then won all of their playoff games, qualifying Turkey for the 2022 World Qualification Event as well as the 2022 European Curling Championships main event. At the 2022 World Qualification Event, the team, now led by Karakurt, went 3–3, missing the playoffs and an attempt to qualify for the 2022 World Men's Curling Championship.

At the 2022 European Curling Championships, the team, skipped by Karagöz again, went 4–5, good enough to qualify the team for the 2023 World Men's Curling Championship, the first World Men's Championship for Turkey. On the World Curling Tour, the team won the 2023 Belgium Men's Challenger. At the World Championships, the team finished in eleventh place, with a 2–11 record, winning the first ever games at the Worlds for the Turkish men's team.

== Personal life ==
Yüce is currently employed as a curling instructor.

== Teams ==
Season	Skip	Third	Second	Lead	Alternate
2019–20	Uğurcan Karagöz	Oğuzhan Karakurt	Muhammed Zeki Uçan	Orhun Yüce	Muhammed Caglayan
2019–20	Oğuzhan Karakurt	Orhun Yüce	Muhammet Haydar Demirel	Faruk Kavaz	Eren Yıldız
2021–22	Uğurcan Karagöz	Oğuzhan Karakurt	Muhammed Zeki Uçan	Orhun Yüce	Muhammet Haydar Demirel
2022–23	Uğurcan Karagöz	Muhammet Haydar Demirel	Muhammed Zeki Uçan	Orhun Yüce	Faruk Kavaz
