= Ottawa Wheels =

- City: Ottawa, Ontario
- Founded: 1994
- Home arena: Ottawa Civic Centre (1995); Corel Centre (1996 - 1997)
- Colours: Green, Blue, Red, Black, White
- Murphy Cups: None
- Conference Championships: None
- Division Championships: None

Franchise history
- New England Stingers (1994) Ottawa Loggers (1995 - 1997) Ottawa Wheels (1997)

The Ottawa Loggers were a roller hockey team in the Roller Hockey International (RHI) league. They played as the Loggers from 1995 to 1996, until they changed their name to the Ottawa Wheels.

== History ==
For the 1995 RHI season, the New England Stingers relocated to Ottawa, ON and changed their name to the Loggers. The team finished second in the Atlantic Division that season with a 14-9-1 record, which was third in the Eastern Conference. In the regular season, centreman Chris Palmer led the team in scoring with 35 goals and 33 assists in 22 games, which was ninth in the league. Goaltender Sylvain Rodrigue won the Outstanding Goaltender award for posting an .838 save percentage and a 6.06 goals-against average in seventeen regular-season matches. In the playoffs, the Loggers lost to the Philadelphia Bulldogs in a two-game sweep of the best-of-three series.

The 1996 RHI season was not nearly as successful as the inaugural season for the Loggers. The team finished last in the Central Division and the Eastern Conference, and failed to qualify for the playoffs.

One week before the start of the 1997 RHI season the league took over the team due to financial difficulties.

== Season-by-season record ==
Season	GP	W	L	OTL	PTS	GF	GA
1995	24	14	9	1	29	181	155
1996	28	3	22	3	9	174	263
