= Faruk Kavaz =

Turkish curler

- Curler
- Born: January 2, 1999 (age 27); Erzurum, Turkey

Team
- Curling club: Milli Piyango CA, Erzurum
- Skip: Uğurcan Karagöz
- Third: Muhammet Haydar Demirel
- Second: Muhammed Zeki Uçan
- Lead: Orhun Yüce
- Alternate: Faruk Kavaz

Curling career
- Member Association: Turkey
- World Championship: 1 (2023)
- European Championship: 2 (2022, 2023)

Faruk Kavaz (born January 2, 1999) is a Turkish curler from Erzurum. He is currently the alternate on the Turkish National Men's Curling Team skipped by Uğurcan Karagöz.

== Career ==
Kavaz was the lead on the Turkish junior men's team, skipped by Oğuzhan Karakurt, during the 2019–20 season. The team played in the 2019 World Junior-B Curling Championships, finishing with a 5–2 record. They then lost in the quarterfinals 7–4 to Italy's Giacomo Colli.

The following season, Kavaz aged out of juniors. He would join the Turkish men's team for the 2022–23 season as their alternate. At the 2022 European Curling Championships, the team, skipped by Uğurcan Karagöz, went 4–5, good enough to qualify the team for the 2023 World Men's Curling Championship, the first World Men's Championship for Turkey. On the World Curling Tour, the team won the 2023 Belgium Men's Challenger. At the World Championships, the team finished in eleventh place, with a 2–11 record, winning the first ever games at the Worlds for the Turkish men's team.

== Personal life ==
Kavaz is currently a student.

== Teams ==
Season	Skip	Third	Second	Lead	Alternate
2019–20	Oğuzhan Karakurt	Orhun Yüce	Muhammet Haydar Demirel	Faruk Kavaz	Eren Yıldız
2022–23	Uğurcan Karagöz	Muhammet Haydar Demirel	Muhammed Zeki Uçan	Orhun Yüce	Faruk Kavaz
