= Sylvain Rodrigue =

Canadian ice hockey player and coach

- Born: June 27, 1973 (age 51); Montreal, Quebec, Canada
- Height: 5 ft 11 in (180 cm)
- Weight: 161 lb (73 kg; 11 st 7 lb)
- Position: Goaltender
- Shot: Left
- Played for: AHL; Hershey Bears; Ligue Magnus; Ducs d'Angers; QSPHL; Jonquière Condors; Saguenay Paramedic; LNAH; Saint-Georges Garaga
- NHL draft: Undrafted
- Playing career: 1997–2005

Sylvain Rodrigue (born June 27, 1973) is a Canadian former ice hockey and roller hockey goaltender who is currently the goaltender coach for the Charlotte Checkers in the American Hockey League.

== Roller hockey ==
Rodrigue played professional roller hockey with the Pittsburgh Phantoms during the 1994 RHI season, and with the Ottawa Loggers during the 1995 RHI season where he won the Outstanding Goaltender award for posting an .838 save percentage and a 6.06 goals-against average in seventeen regular-season matches. He also played in the 2nd Roller Hockey International All-Star Game.

== Awards and honours ==
Award	Year
Clare Drake Award - CIS Rookie of the year	1994–95
