= 2021 Americas Challenge =

- Host city: Lacombe, Alberta
- Arena: Lacombe Curling Club
- Dates: October 29–31
- Winner: Canada
- Curling club: Saville Community SC, Edmonton, Alberta
- Skip: Brendan Bottcher
- Third: Darren Moulding
- Second: Brad Thiessen
- Lead: Karrick Martin
- Alternate: Pat Janssen
- Coach: Don Bartlett
- Finalist: Brazil (Mello)

The 2021 Americas Challenge is a curling challenge that took place from October 29 to 31 at Lacombe Curling Club in Lacombe, Alberta. The challenge was used to determine the second team from the Americas Zone to qualify for the 2022 World Men's Curling Championship, as the United States already qualifies as the host nation. It is the second time Canada has participated in the challenge, with their first being in 2018 where they defeated Brazil 3–0 in the best-of-five series. No women's challenge was held.

== Background ==
The World Curling Federation allots two men's and two women's spots for the Americas Zone at the World Curling Championships. For the 2022 Championships, the United States has automatically claimed the first slot, due to being the host country of the event.

Mexico and Brazil challenged Canada, who would have otherwise qualified automatically due to their finish at the 2021 World Men's Curling Championship. This is the eighth men's challenge to be held, but only the second where Canada was challenged. The winning team earns the second Americas Zone slot at the World Championships and the runner-up earns the one Americas Zone slot at the 2022 World Qualification Event, giving them another attempt to qualify for the Championships.

== Teams ==
The teams are listed as follows:

Country	Skip	Third	Second	Lead	Alternate
Brazil	Marcelo Mello	Ricardo Losso	Gilad Kempenich	Filipe Nunes	Henrique Kempenich
Canada	Brendan Bottcher	Darren Moulding	Brad Thiessen	Karrick Martin	Pat Janssen
Mexico	Jesús Barajas	Ramy Cohen	Christopher Barajas	Alex Sánchez	

== Standings ==
Final Standings

Key
Team to 2022 World Men's Curling Championship
Team to 2022 World Qualification Event

Country	Skip	W	L	PF	PA
Canada	Brendan Bottcher	4	0	46	5
Brazil	Marcelo Mello	2	2	19	29
Mexico	Jesús Barajas	0	4	10	41

Round Robin Summary Table
Pos.	Country	Brazil		Canada		Mexico		Record
Pos.	Country	1st	2nd	1st	2nd	1st	2nd	Record
2	Brazil	—N/a		2–11	1–10	9–6	7–2	2–2
1	Canada	11–2	10–1	—		14–1	11–1	4–0
3	Mexico	6–9	2–7	1–14	1–11	—		0–4

== Results ==
All draw times are listed in Mountain Daylight Time (UTC−06:00).

=== Draw 1 ===
Friday, October 29, 19:00

Sheet C	1	2	3	4	5	6	7	8	9	10	Final
Canada (Bottcher) 🔨	6	0	0	3	1	1	X	X	X	X	11
Brazil (Mello)	0	1	1	0	0	0	X	X	X	X	2

=== Draw 2 ===
Saturday, October 30, 9:00

Sheet C	1	2	3	4	5	6	7	8	9	10	Final
Brazil (Mello) 🔨	2	0	2	0	0	0	1	2	2	X	9
Mexico (Barajas)	0	2	0	0	2	2	0	0	0	X	6

=== Draw 3 ===
Saturday, October 30, 14:00

Sheet C	1	2	3	4	5	6	7	8	9	10	Final
Canada (Bottcher) 🔨	5	3	4	1	0	1	X	X	X	X	14
Mexico (Barajas)	0	0	0	0	1	0	X	X	X	X	1

=== Draw 4 ===
Saturday, October 30, 19:00

Sheet C	1	2	3	4	5	6	7	8	9	10	Final
Canada (Bottcher) 🔨	3	1	0	1	1	4	X	X	X	X	10
Brazil (Mello)	0	0	1	0	0	0	X	X	X	X	1

=== Draw 5 ===
Sunday, October 31, 9:00

Sheet C	1	2	3	4	5	6	7	8	9	10	Final
Brazil (Mello) 🔨	1	0	0	1	2	1	0	1	1	X	7
Mexico (Barajas)	0	2	0	0	0	0	0	0	0	X	2

=== Draw 6 ===
Sunday, October 31, 14:00

Sheet C	1	2	3	4	5	6	7	8	9	10	Final
Canada (Bottcher) 🔨	3	2	3	1	2	0	X	X	X	X	11
Mexico (Barajas)	0	0	0	0	0	1	X	X	X	X	1
