= TD Place Arena =

Architectural structure at Lansdowne Park in Ottawa

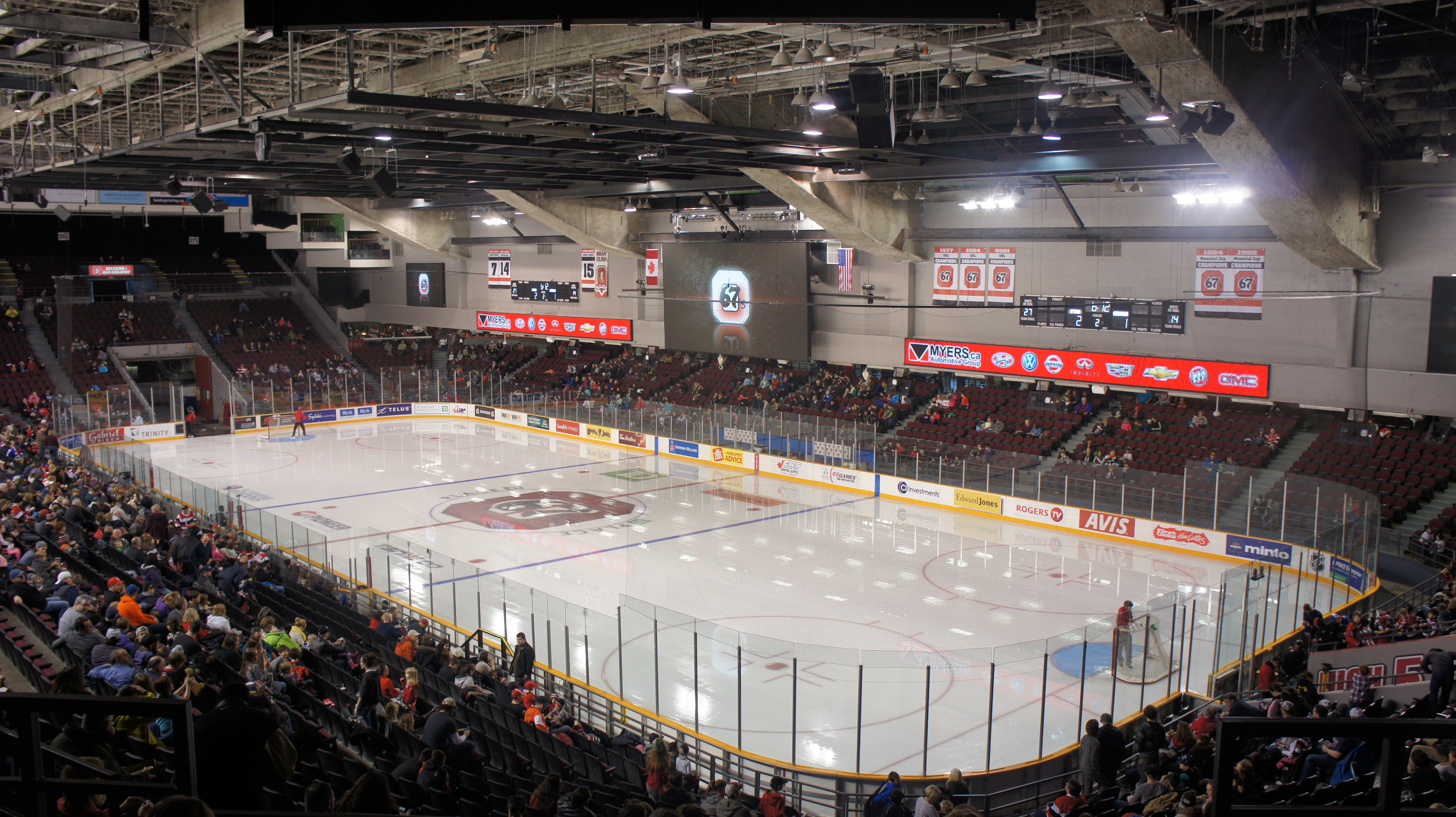
- TD Place Arena interior in January 2016
- Interactive map of TD Place Arena
- Former names: Ottawa Civic Centre (1966–2009, 2012–2014); Urbandale Centre (2009–2010); Rona Centre (2010–2011); J. Benson Cartage Centre (2011–2012)
- Address: 1015 Bank Street
- Location: Ottawa, Ontario
- Coordinates: 45°23′55.99″N 75°41′2.84″W
- Owner: City of Ottawa
- Operator: Ottawa Sports & Entertainment Group
- Capacity: 10,500 (1967–1993); 10,575 (1993–2005); 9,862 (2005–2014); 5,500–8,585 (2014–present)
- Surface: Multi-surface
- Public transit: OC Transpo Local Routes 6 , 7 , Special Routes 450-455

Construction
- Groundbreaking: 1966
- Opened: December 29, 1967
- Renovated: 1992, 2005, 2012–2014
- Cost: C$9.5 million ($86.2 million in 2025 dollars)
- Architects: Craig and Kohler

Tenants
- Ottawa 67's (OHL) 1967–2012, 2014–present Ottawa Nationals (WHA) 1972–1973; Ottawa Civics (WHA) 1976; Ottawa Senators (NHL) 1992–1996; Ottawa Loggers (RHI) 1995; Ottawa Rebel (NLL) 2002–2003; Ottawa BlackJacks (CEBL) 2020–present Ottawa Charge (PWHL) 2024–2026

TD Place Arena, originally the Ottawa Civic Centre, is an indoor arena located in Ottawa, Ontario, Canada. Opened in December 1967, it is used primarily for sports, including curling, figure skating, ice hockey, and lacrosse. The arena is directly under the north grandstand of TD Place Stadium, an adjacent outdoor stadium. TD Place Arena has hosted Canadian and world championships in figure skating, curling, and ice hockey, including the first women's world ice hockey championship in 1990. It is also used for concerts and conventions such as the former Ottawa SuperEX.

The arena is the home to the Ottawa 67's of the Ontario Hockey League (OHL) and the Ottawa BlackJacks of the Canadian Elite Basketball League (CEBL). It was the home of the Ottawa Senators of the National Hockey League (NHL) from 1992 through 1995, the Ottawa Nationals of the World Hockey Association (WHA) from 1972 to 1973, the Ottawa Civics of the WHA in 1976, the Ottawa Rebel of the National Lacrosse League (NLL) from 2002 to 2003, and the Ottawa Charge of the Professional Women's Hockey League (PWHL) from 2024 to 2026.

Canadian prime ministers Pierre Trudeau, John Turner, Brian Mulroney, and Kim Campbell were elected party leaders during party conferences that were held at TD Place Arena.

== History ==
In the 1960s, the City of Ottawa was preparing to rebuild the football stadium at Lansdowne Park, on Bank Street at the Rideau Canal. During the planning phase, the old Ottawa Auditorium arena was demolished and the City now needed two new sports venues. The City combined plans and the arena, named the Civic Centre, was built together under the north grandstand of the football stadium.

The stadium features large steel girders to support its overhanging roof, which were brought to the stadium site by barge.

The new Civic Centre opened on December 29, 1967—although seating was not complete—for an exhibition game between the Ottawa 67's, boosted by five players from the Montreal Junior Canadiens, and the NHL Montreal Canadiens. Seats were taken temporarily from the Coliseum building nearby. Then President Howard Darwin said about 500 fans had to be turned away at the door. Of the 9,000 who attended the opening game, only six ticket-holders requested and received refunds. The football stadium and arena complex served as the official Canadian Centennial project for the city of Ottawa, as federal government grant money depended on the facility opening within 1967, and construction was rushed to meet the deadline.

It was renovated and seating increased in 1992 in order to temporarily accommodate the Ottawa Senators of the National Hockey League.

In 2009, the Ottawa 67’s owner, Jeff Hunt, launched a contest to sell the Civic Centre's naming rights for one year; the winning bidder was Urbandale Construction, and the arena was temporarily renamed “Urbandale Centre” for the 2009–10 season. Similar one-year naming agreements followed, and the arena was known as the Rona Centre in 2010–11 and J. Benson Cartage Centre in 2011–12. The name reverted to Ottawa Civic Centre in 2012 when the facility closed for extensive renovations.

In October 2012, work began on a major refurbishment of the Civic Centre as part of the Lansdowne Park redevelopment. The project included installing a new roof and other upgrades, with a target completion in 2014. During construction, the Ottawa 67’s played their 2012–13 and 2013–14 seasons at Scotiabank Place (Canadian Tire Centre) in Kanata to accommodate the accelerated work schedule. The arena reopened in late 2014 and was officially renamed “TD Place Arena” under a sponsorship deal with the Toronto-Dominion Bank.

The renovation also sealed up constant leaks that had been a problem for the Civic Centre for years. During the 2011–12 season, a 67's game had to be rescheduled because of the leaking roof. Midway through the renovation process at the end of 2013, steel corrosion was discovered by workers and cost an extra $17 million to repair.

== Sports ==
=== Ice hockey ===
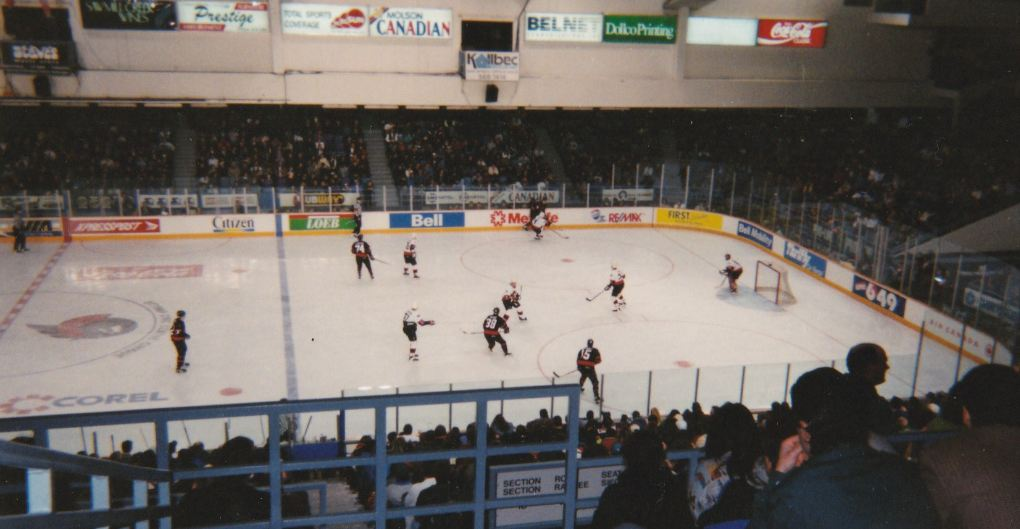
The NHL's Ottawa Senators played in the arena from 1992 to 1996

The primary tenant since the building's opening has been the Ottawa 67's junior men's team. In 1998, the team was bought by local businessman Jeff Hunt, and he successfully improved attendance to take advantage of the arena's large capacity. Since then, the 67's have been one of the top-10 junior teams in Canada in terms of attendance, often finishing first on the list. The 1972 and 1999 Memorial Cup tournaments were played at the arena.

In the 1970s, the arena was home to two WHA teams, the Ottawa Nationals and Ottawa Civics. Neither survived in Ottawa for more than one season. The Nationals played for one regular season, but moved their playoff games to Toronto, and subsequently moved there permanently to become the Toronto Toros. The Civics were the hastily transplanted Denver Spurs franchise that played only two home games in Ottawa before disbanding.

The arena hosted the first-ever Canada Cup hockey game on September 2, 1976, when Canada defeated Finland 11-2. The arena also hosted games for the 1981 Canada Cup.

The arena was the site of the first IIHF Women's World Ice Hockey Championships in 1990. Canada defeated the United States 5–2 on March 25, 1990, to win the gold medal.

Starting in 1992, the Ottawa Senators called the arena home for three and a half NHL seasons. In preparation for hosting the NHL, the arena was refurbished, adding additional seating and 32 private boxes.

In 1995, Roller Hockey International's Ottawa Loggers (renamed the "Ottawa Wheels" prior to their move to the Corel Centre) brought inline hockey to the arena.

In 2008 and 2009, it was used for games of the 2009 World Junior Ice Hockey Championships.

Beginning in 2024, the arena was the home of the Ottawa Charge. The team's first ever game on January 2, 2024, drew 8,318 fans, which set a new attendance record for professional women's hockey. In the game, Montreal defeated Ottawa 3–2 in overtime. The Charge relocated from the TD Place Arena to the Canadian Tire Centre for the 2026–27 season.

=== Figure skating ===
The arena's unique arrangement of having most of the seats on one side of the ice has been described by Barbara Underhill as making it an ideal venue for figure skating presentations. The arena has hosted the 1978 and 1984 World Figure Skating Championships and the 2003 World Synchronized Skating Championships. The arena has hosted the Canadian Figure Skating Championships in 1987, 1996, 1999, 2006 and 2017.

Both Worlds provided memorable moments in sports. In 1978 Vern Taylor performed the first 'Triple Axel' jump in competition. In 1984, the Canadian pairs champions Barbara Underhill and Paul Martini won the Championship in dramatic fashion:

"After a disappointing Olympics in Sarajevo, Barbara and Paul seriously contemplated retiring from skating before Worlds'. However, advised by their friend Brian Orser to put on her old skate boots, Barbara and Paul were propelled onto the ice, onto the podium and into history. Their flawless program is considered one of the great Canadian sporting moments and gave Canada a national thrill."

=== Other sports ===
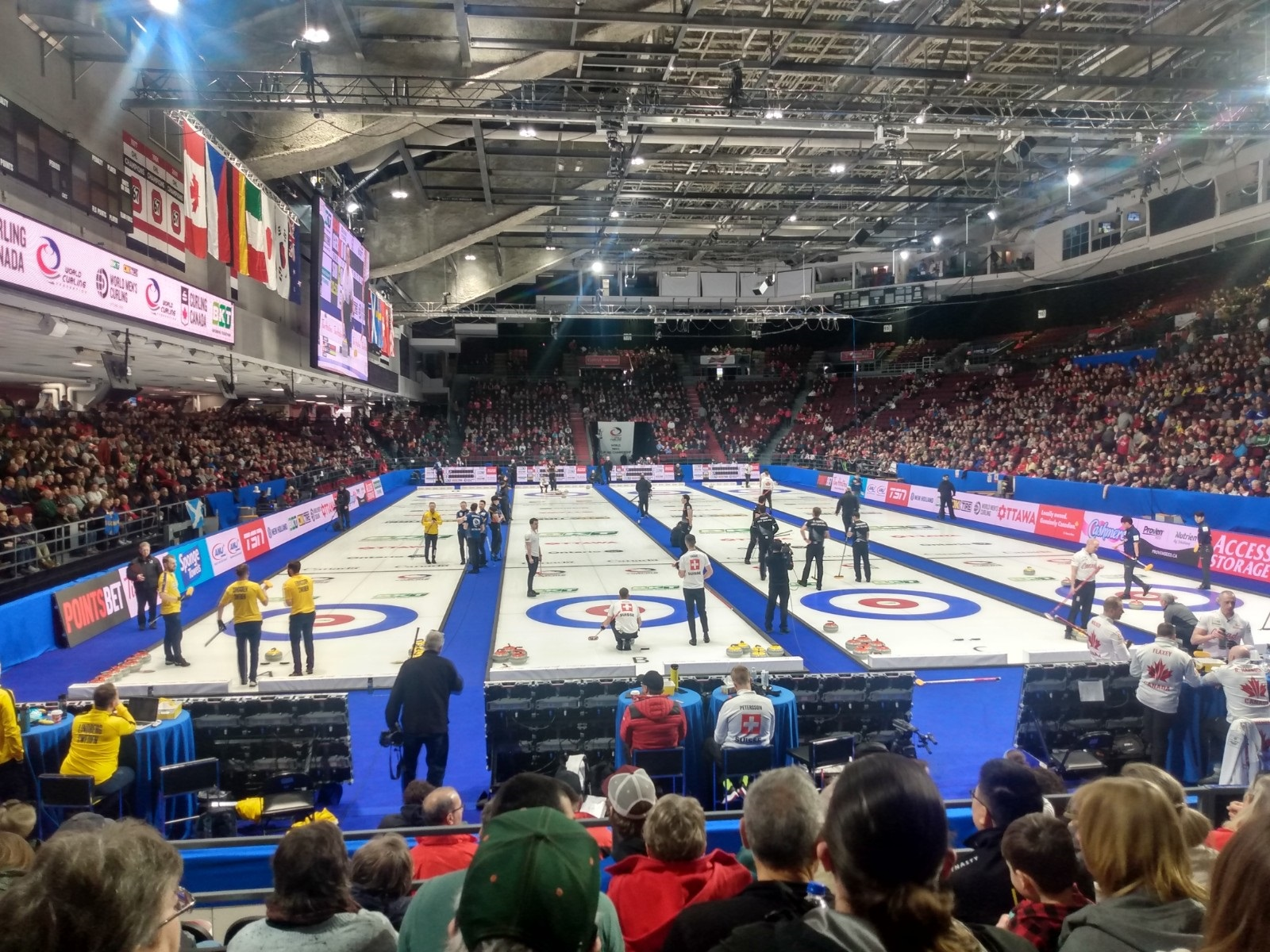
The 2023 World Men's Curling Championship was played at TD Place

The arena has been a frequent venue for major curling events. It has hosted the Canadian men’s championship, the Tim Hortons Brier, four times: in 1979, 1993, 2001, and 2016 (all held at what is now TD Place Arena). It also hosted the 1990 Scott Tournament of Hearts (Canadian women's championship) and, most recently, the 2023 World Men's Curling Championship from April 1–9, 2023.

The arena was the home of the Ottawa Rebel of the National Lacrosse League for one and a half seasons.

The World Wrestling Federation used the arena for shows until 1996.

In June 2016, the arena held a MMA event, hosting UFC Fight Night: MacDonald vs. Thompson. In September 2026, the 2026 Wheelchair Basketball World Championships were held in the arena.

=== Non-sports usage ===
In April 1968, the arena hosted the Liberal Party of Canada leadership convention, when Pierre Trudeau was named Canadian Prime Minister. It also hosted the 1984 Liberal Party leadership convention. The arena also hosted the Progressive Conservative leadership conventions in 1983 and 1993.

Until the mid-2000s, the Central Canada Exhibition, or Ottawa SuperEx, used the arena for concerts and exhibits.

== Redevelopment ==
In November 2025, Ottawa City Council approved the “Lansdowne 2.0” redevelopment plan, which includes demolishing the aging TD Place Arena and replacing it with a new mid-sized event centre. The new arena is planned to have about 6,600 permanent seats for hockey (expandable to roughly 7,000 for concerts). Construction on the replacement arena is scheduled to begin in 2026, with the existing arena (and north stadium stands above it) to be torn down after the 2027 CFL season. The new event centre is expected to open by 2030 as part of a revamped Lansdowne Park complex. The Professional Women's Hockey League, whose Ottawa franchise is a key tenant, expressed concern that the initially planned capacity (5,500 seats, later increased to 6,600) was insufficient for the team's growing audience. The Charge subsequently moved to the Canadian Tire Centre.

== Gallery ==
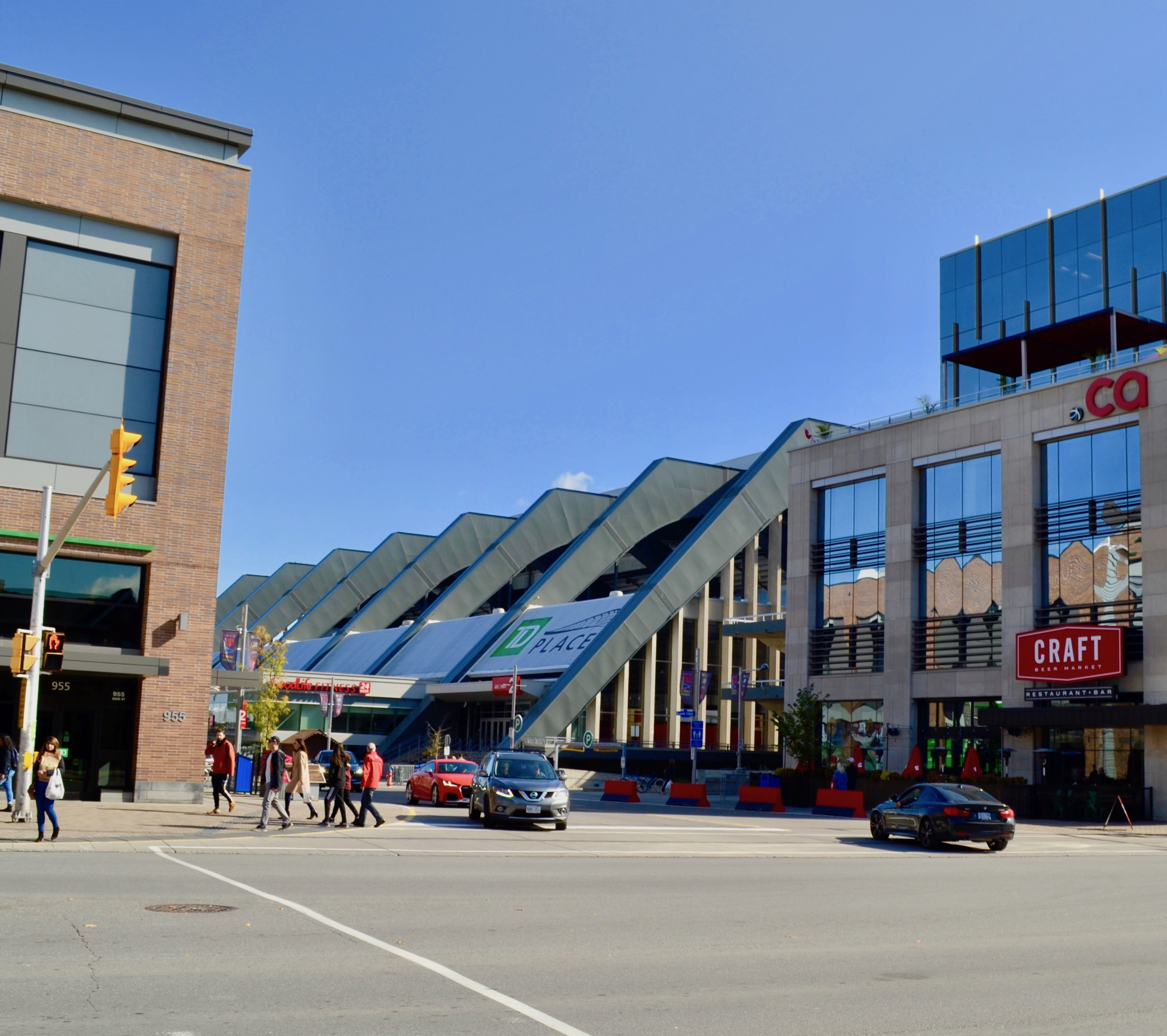
Main entrance in 2019 from Bank Street

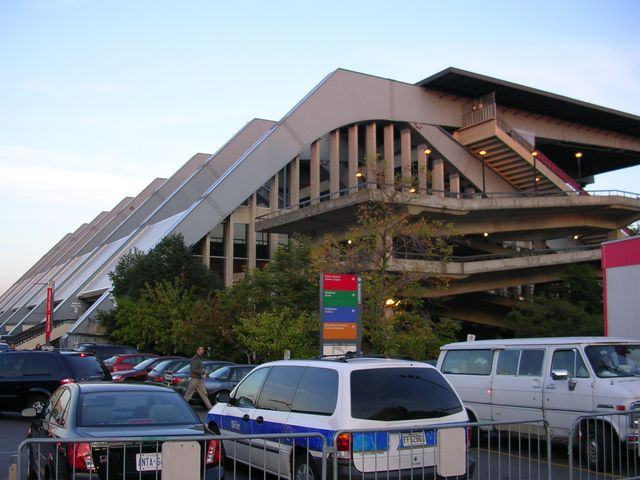
Side view of the exterior in 2004

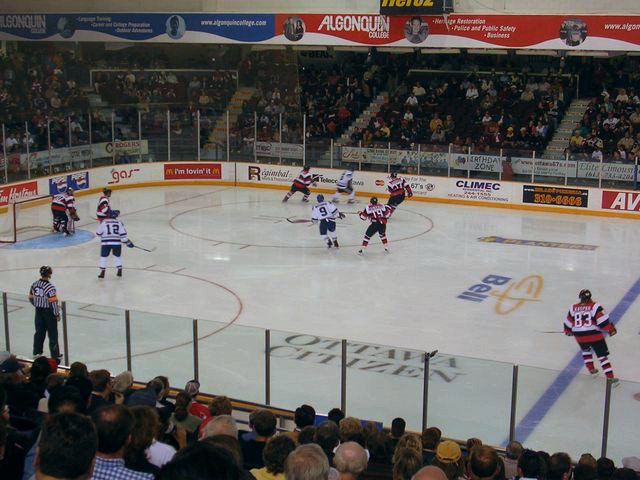
View of the much lower ceiling under the stadium grandstand.

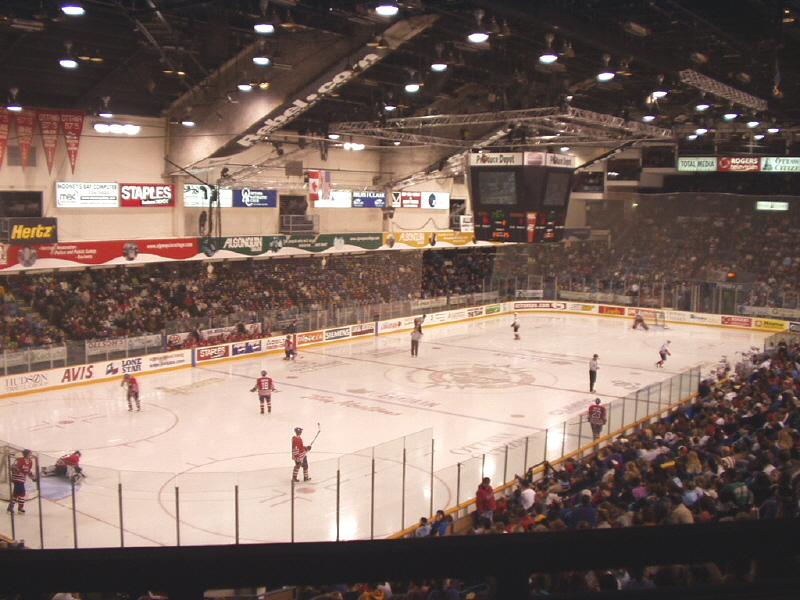
Interior prior to 2012 renovations

== See also ==
- TD Place Stadium
- Ice hockey in Ottawa
- Lansdowne Park
- List of indoor arenas in Canada

Preceded by first arena	Home of Ottawa Senators; 1992 – 1996	Succeeded by The Palladium
Preceded by Robert Guertin Arena	Home of Ottawa 67's 1968 – present	Succeeded by Current
