= Muhammet Haydar Demirel =

Turkish curler (born 2000)

- Curler
- Born: January 4, 2000 (age 26); Erzurum, Turkey

Team
- Skip: Uğurcan Karagöz
- Third: Muhammet Haydar Demirel
- Second: Muhammed Zeki Uçan
- Lead: Orhun Yüce
- Alternate: Faruk Kavaz

Curling career
- Member Association: Turkey
- World Championship: 1 (2023)
- European Championship: 3 (2021, 2022, 2023)

Muhammet Haydar Demirel (born April 1, 2000) is a Turkish curler from Erzurum, Turkey. He currently plays third on the Turkish National Men's Curling Team skipped by Uğurcan Karagöz.

== Career ==
=== Juniors ===
Demirel made his international debut at the 2017 European Youth Olympic Winter Festival, at home in Erzurum throwing third on the Turkish team, skipped by Oğuzhan Karakurt. After finishing the round robin with a 2–2 record, the team lost in the semifinals and in the bronze medal game, settling for fourth.

Demirel was a member of the Turkish men's junior team at three World Junior-B Curling Championships from 2018 to 2019. At the 2018 World Junior B Curling Championships, he played second on the team, which was skipped by Karakurt. There, the team finished with a 4–3 record in pool play, missing the playoffs. At the 2019 World Junior-B Curling Championships, Demirel played third on the team. This time, the team finished with a 5–2 record in pool play, making the playoffs, where they lost to South Korea in the quarterfinals. At the following season's Junior B, Demirel was back to throwing second stones. The team finished with another 5–2 record, but once again lost in the quarterfinals, this time to Italy.

=== Men's ===
Following his men's career, Demirel joined the Turkish men's team in 2021, playing as the team's alternate for the 2021–22 curling season. His first men's event was at the 2021 Pre-Olympic Qualification Event at home in Erzurum, in an attempt to qualify Turkey for the Olympic Qualification Event. The team, skipped by Uğurcan Karagöz made it to the qualification final, where they lost to Finland. Demirel didn't play in any games. The team then played in 2021 European Curling Championships, where Turkey was playing in the "B" event. The team had a strong event, finishing 6–1 in pool play, in first place. They then won all of their playoff games, qualifying Turkey for the 2022 World Qualification Event as well as the 2022 European Curling Championships main event. Demirel played in three games. At the 2022 World Qualification Event, the team, now led by Karakurt, went 3–3, missing the playoffs and an attempt to qualify for the 2022 World Men's Curling Championship. Despite being the alternate, Demirel played in five games.

For the 2022–23 curling season, Demirel was promoted to be the team's third. At the 2022 European Curling Championships, the team, skipped by Karagöz again, went 4–5, good enough to qualify the team for the 2023 World Men's Curling Championship, the first World Men's Championship for Turkey. On the World Curling Tour, the team won the 2023 Belgium Men's Challenger. At the World Championships, the team finished in eleventh place, with a 2–11 record, winning the first ever games at the Worlds for the Turkish men's team.

== Personal life ==
Demirel is currently a student.

== Teams ==
Season	Skip	Third	Second	Lead	Alternate
2016–17	Oğuzhan Karakurt	Muhammet Haydar Demirel	Ahmet Alperen Tunga	Ishak Ozsubasi	Batuhan Bugra Kaygusuz
2017–18	Oğuzhan Karakurt	Tunç Esenboga	Muhammet Haydar Demirel	Muhammed Caglayan	Mahsun Çelebi
2018–19	Oğuzhan Karakurt	Muhammet Haydar Demirel	Mahsun Çelebi	Muhammed Caglayan	Tunç Esenboga
2019–20	Oğuzhan Karakurt	Orhun Yüce	Muhammet Haydar Demirel	Faruk Kavaz	Eren Yıldız
2021–22	Uğurcan Karagöz	Oğuzhan Karakurt	Muhammed Zeki Uçan	Orhun Yüce	Muhammet Haydar Demirel
2022–23	Uğurcan Karagöz	Muhammet Haydar Demirel	Muhammed Zeki Uçan	Orhun Yüce	Faruk Kavaz
