= Muhammed Zeki Uçan =

Turkish male curler

- Curler ♂
- Born: 12 July 1996 (age 30); Erzurum

Team
- Skip: Uğurcan Karagöz
- Third: Muhammet Haydar Demirel
- Second: Muhammed Zeki Uçan
- Lead: Orhun Yüce
- Alternate: Faruk Kavaz

Curling career
- Member Association: Turkey
- World Championship: 1 (2023)
- World Mixed Doubles Championship: 1 (2022)
- European Championship: 6 (2017, 2018, 2019, 2021, 2022, 2023)
- Other appearances: World Junior Championships: 2 (2016, 2017)

Muhammed Zeki Uçan (born 12 July 1996) is a Turkish curler.

== Personal life ==
Uçan is employed as a teacher.

== Teams ==
=== Men's ===
Season	Skip	Third	Second	Lead	Alternate	Coach	Events
2015–16	Uğurcan Karagöz	Oğuzhan Karakurt	Emre Karaman	Enes Taskesen	Muhammed Zeki Ucan	Ahmet Celik	WJCC 2016 (9th)
2016–17	Uğurcan Karagöz	Emre Karaman	Muhammed Zeki Uçan	Muhammed Caglayan	Ridvan Tekin	Bilal Ömer Çakir	WJCC 2017 (10th)
2017–18	Uğurcan Karagöz	Bilal Ömer Çakir	Oğuzhan Karakurt	Muhammed Zeki Uçan	Emre Karaman	Ahmet Celik, Fatih Isik	ECC 2017 (15th)
2018–19	Uğurcan Karagöz	Oğuzhan Karakurt	Emre Karaman	Enes Muhammed Caglayan	Muhammed Zeki Ucan	Ahmet Celik	ECC 2018 (25th)
2018–19	Bilal Ömer Çakir	Muhammed Zeki Ucan	Muhammet Haydar Demirel	Ahmet Alperen Tunga			
2019–20	Uğurcan Karagöz	Oğuzhan Karakurt	Muhammed Zeki Uçan	Orhun Yüce	Muhammed Enes Caglayn	Ahmet Celik, Tony Zummack	ECC 2019 (14th)
2021–22	Uğurcan Karagöz	Oğuzhan Karakurt	Muhammed Zeki Uçan	Orhun Yüce	Muhammet Haydar Demirel	Ahmet Celik	ECC 2021 (11th)

=== Mixed doubles ===
Season	Female	Male	Coach	Events
2017–18	Dilşat Yıldız	Muhammed Zeki Uçan	Bilal Ömer Çakir	WMDCC 2022 (...th)
