= New England Stingers =

- City: Portland, Maine
- Founded: 1994
- Home arena: Cumberland County Civic Center
- Colors: Jade, Royal Blue, Black, White
- Murphy Cups: None
- Conference Championships: None
- Division Championships: None

Franchise history
- New England Stingers (1994) Ottawa Loggers (1995 - 1997) Ottawa Wheels (1997)

The New England Stingers were a professional roller hockey team based in Portland, Maine, United States that played in Roller Hockey International.
