= 1970 Rothmans International Vancouver =

- Date: 29 September – 3 October
- Edition: 1st
- Category: World Championship Tennis (WCT)
- Draw: 16S / 8D
- Prize money: $40,000
- Surface: Carpet / indoor
- Location: Vancouver, BC, Canada
- Venue: PNE Agrodome

Champions

Singles
- (Australia) Rod Laver

Doubles
- (Australia) Roy Emerson / (Australia) Rod Laver
- Vancouver WCT

The 1970 Rothmans International Vancouver, also known as the Vancouver WCT, was a men's professional tennis tournament that was part of the 1970 World Championship Tennis circuit. It was held on indoor carpet courts at the PNE Agrodome in Vancouver, British Columbia in Canada. It was the inaugural edition of the tournament and was held from 29 September through 3 October 1970. Rod Laver won the singles title and earned $10,000 first-prize money.

== Finals ==
=== Singles ===
(Australia) Rod Laver defeated (Australia) Roy Emerson 6–2, 6–1, 6–2

- It was Laver's 13th singles title of the year and the 41st of his career in the Open Era.

=== Doubles ===
(Australia) Roy Emerson / (Australia) Rod Laver defeated (France) Pierre Barthès / (Socialist Federal Republic of Yugoslavia) Nikola Pilić 6–1, 6–4, 6–3
