= 1970 Rothmans International Vancouver – Singles =

Tennis tournament event

Singles
- 1970 Rothmans International Vancouver

Final
- Champion: (Australia) Rod Laver
- Runner-up: (Australia) Roy Emerson
- Score: 6–2, 6–1, 6–2

Details
- Draw: 16

Events
Singles	Doubles
Vancouver WCT	· 1971 →

The 1970 Rothmans International Vancouver – Singles was an event of the 1970 Rothmans International Vancouver tennis tournament played at the PNE Agrodome in Vancouver, Canada from 29 September through 3 October 1970. Rod Laver won the singles title, defeating Roy Emerson 6–2, 6–1, 6–2 in the final.

== Draw ==
=== Key ===
- Q = Qualifier
- WC = Wild card
- LL = Lucky loser
- Alt = Alternate
- ITF = ITF entry
- PR = Protected ranking
- SR = Special ranking
- SE = Special exempt
- JE = Junior exempt
- JR = Junior Accelerator Programme entrant
- CO = College Accelerator Programme entrant
- NG = Next Gen Accelerator Program entrant
- w/o = Walkover
- r = Retired
- d = Defaulted

First Round
(Australia) Rod Laver	6	6
(France) Pierre Barthès	1	1
(United States) Pancho Gonzales	6	6
(United Kingdom) Mark Cox	4	2
(Netherlands) Tom Okker	7	7
(Egypt) Ismail El Shafei	6	6
(South Africa) Cliff Drysdale	2	6	6
(Australia) Tony Roche	6	4	1
(Australia) Roy Emerson	1	7	6
(Socialist Federal Republic of Yugoslavia) Nikola Pilić	6	6	4
(United States) Marty Riessen	6	6
(United Kingdom) Roger Taylor	2	2
(Spain) Andrés Gimeno	6	6
(Australia) Fred Stolle	4	3
(Australia) John Newcombe	6	6
(United Kingdom) Graham Stilwell	1	3

Quarterfinals
(Australia) Rod Laver	6	7
(United States) Pancho Gonzales	3	5
(Netherlands) Tom Okker	6	6
(South Africa) Cliff Drysdale	3	4
(Australia) Roy Emerson	6	6
(United States) Marty Riessen	3	1
(Spain) Andrés Gimeno	6	6
(Australia) John Newcombe	3	3

Semifinals
(Australia) Rod Laver	6	6
(Netherlands) Tom Okker	4	0
(Australia) Roy Emerson	6	6
(Spain) Andrés Gimeno	3	3

Final
(Australia) Rod Laver	6	6	6
(Australia) Roy Emerson	2	1	2
