= 1971 Rothmans International Vancouver =

- Date: 3–11 October
- Edition: 2nd
- Category: World Championship Tennis (WCT)
- Draw: 31S / 15D
- Prize money: $50,000
- Surface: Carpet / indoor
- Location: Vancouver, BC, Canada
- Venue: PNE Agrodome

Champions

Singles
- (Australia) Ken Rosewall

Doubles
- (Australia) Roy Emerson / (Australia) Rod Laver
- Vancouver WCT

The 1971 Rothmans International Vancouver, also known as the Vancouver WCT, was a men's professional tennis tournament that was part of the 1971 World Championship Tennis circuit. It was held on indoor carpet courts at the PNE Agrodome in Vancouver, British Columbia in Canada. It was the second edition of the tournament and was held from 3 October through 11 October 1971. Fourth-seeded Ken Rosewall won the singles title and earned $10,000 first-prize money.

== Finals ==
=== Singles ===
(Australia) Ken Rosewall defeated (Netherlands) Tom Okker 6–2, 6–2, 6–4

- It was Rosewall's 7th singles title of the year and the 20th of his career in the Open Era.

=== Doubles ===
(Australia) Roy Emerson / (Australia) Rod Laver defeated (Australia) John Alexander / (Australia) Phil Dent 5–7, 6–7, 6–0, 7–5, 7–6
