= 1971 Rothmans International Vancouver – Singles =

Tennis tournament event

Singles
- 1971 Rothmans International Vancouver

Final
- Champion: (Australia) Ken Rosewall
- Runner-up: (Netherlands) Tom Okker
- Score: 6–2, 6–2, 6–4

Details
- Draw: 32

Events
Singles	Doubles
Vancouver WCT	· 1972 →

The 1971 Rothmans International Vancouver – Singles was an event of the 1971 Rothmans International Vancouver tennis tournament played at the PNE Agrodome in Vancouver, Canada from 3 October through 11 October 1971. Rod Laver was the defending champion but lost in the semifinals. Ken Rosewall won the singles title, defeating Tom Okker in the final, 6–2, 6–2, 6–4.

== Draw ==
=== Key ===
- Q = Qualifier
- WC = Wild card
- LL = Lucky loser
- Alt = Alternate
- ITF = ITF entry
- PR = Protected ranking
- SR = Special ranking
- SE = Special exempt
- JE = Junior exempt
- JR = Junior Accelerator Programme entrant
- CO = College Accelerator Programme entrant
- NG = Next Gen Accelerator Program entrant
- w/o = Walkover
- r = Retired
- d = Defaulted

=== Finals ===
Semifinals
(Australia) Rod Laver	7	4	3
(Netherlands) Tom Okker	5	6	6
(Australia) Ken Rosewall	6	6
(Australia) Roy Emerson	4	1

Final
(Netherlands) Tom Okker	2	2	4
(Australia) Ken Rosewall	6	6	6

=== Top half ===
First Round
(Australia) Rod Laver	6	6
(Denmark) Torben Ulrich	2	3
(Australia) Phil Dent	6	7
(United States) Barry MacKay (tennis)	3	6
(United States) Bob Lutz	6	3
(South Africa) Bob Maud	7	6
(Spain) Andrés Gimeno	6	6	6
(United Kingdom) Graham Stilwell	7	4	3
(United States) Arthur Ashe	6	3	4
(Egypt) Ismail El Shafei	1	6	6
(Socialist Federal Republic of Yugoslavia) Nikola Pilić	6	6
(Australia) Ray Ruffels	3	2
(South Africa) Terry Ryan	7	7
(United States) Ronald Holmberg	5	5
(Netherlands) Tom Okker	6	3	6
(South Africa) Frew McMillan	3	6	4

Second Round
(Australia) Rod Laver	6	6
(Australia) Phil Dent	2	2
(South Africa) Bob Maud	6	5	3
(Spain) Andrés Gimeno	3	7	6
(Egypt) Ismail El Shafei	2	2
(Socialist Federal Republic of Yugoslavia) Nikola Pilić	6	6
(South Africa) Terry Ryan	3	4
(Netherlands) Tom Okker	6	6

Quarterfinals
(Australia) Rod Laver	6	4	6
(Spain) Andrés Gimeno	2	6	2
(Socialist Federal Republic of Yugoslavia) Nikola Pilić	6	6
(Netherlands) Tom Okker	7	7

Semifinals
(Australia) Rod Laver	7	4	3
(Netherlands) Tom Okker	5	6	6

=== Bottom half ===
First Round
(Australia) Ken Rosewall	6	6
(United States) Tom Leonard	3	1
(Australia) Fred Stolle	7	3	6
(New Zealand) Brian Fairlie	6	6	3
(Australia) Allan Stone	6	7
(United States) Charlie Pasarell	3	6
(Australia) Roy Emerson	6	6	6
(Australia) Owen Davidson	7	4	3
(Australia) John Alexander	6	7
(Australia) Bill Bowrey	4	5
(United Kingdom) Mark Cox	6	6
(United States) Roy Barth	3	3
(Australia) Bob Carmichael	3	6	7
(South Africa) Cliff Drysdale	6	4	6

Second Round
(Australia) Ken Rosewall	3	6	6
(Australia) Fred Stolle	6	0	2
(Australia) Allan Stone	1	6
(United States) Marty Riessen	6	7
(Australia) Roy Emerson	7	6
(Australia) John Alexander	6	3
(United Kingdom) Mark Cox	3	6	6
(Australia) Bob Carmichael	6	4	7

Quarterfinals
(Australia) Ken Rosewall	6	7
(United States) Marty Riessen	3	5
(Australia) Roy Emerson	6	6
(Australia) Bob Carmichael	4	1

Semifinals
(Australia) Ken Rosewall	6	6
(Australia) Roy Emerson	4	1
