= Vancouver VooDoo =

Roller hockey team in Vancouver, British Columbia

Vancouver Voodoo
- City: Vancouver, British Columbia
- Founded: 1993
- Home arena: PNE Agrodome (1993–1994); Pacific Coliseum (1994–1995); General Motors Place (1996)
- Colours: Purple, Black, Orange, White
- Murphy Cups: None
- Conference Championships: None
- Division Championships: 1993, 1994, 1995, 1996

Franchise history
- 1993–1996: Vancouver Voodoo

The Vancouver VooDoo were an inline hockey team based in Vancouver, British Columbia, Canada, which played in Roller Hockey International (RHI). The VooDoo were one of the original 12 teams to join the league in 1993. Founded and owned by Tiger Williams and Bill McMenamon, the team played in the PNE Agrodome in 1993 and 1994, the Pacific Coliseum in 1995. In 1996, the team played in General Motors Place after being sold to Orca Bay Sports and Entertainment, but folded in 1996.

== Season by season ==
The Voodoo experienced consistent success in the regular season throughout their four-year history, winning their division all four years. Despite their regular season success, however, the Voodoo never made it out of the second round of the playoffs.

=== 1993 ===
In the RHI's inaugural season, Vancouver finished first in the King Division, atop the Calgary Rad'z, Portland Rage, and Utah Rollerbees, good for second overall, behind the Anaheim Bullfrogs. In the first round of the playoffs, they were eliminated by the division rival Calgary Rad'z 8–7.

Star forward Jose Charbonneau, a former NHLer, led the RHI in regular season scoring with 68 points in 14 games. He attracted the attention of the NHL's Vancouver Canucks, who resigned him, despite having previously released Charbonneau in 1989. Charbonneau went on to play 33 more games for the Canucks before finishing his career in Europe. Team co-owner and head coach Tiger Williams, who holds the NHL career mark for penalty minutes, played in one game for the Voodoo and registered two points, with a goal and an assist, plus two penalty minutes.

Playing at the PNE Agrodome, the Voodoo's average attendance was 3,800.

=== 1994 ===
As league expansion doubles the league's team total to 24, the Voodoo are placed in the new Northwest Division with the Calgary Rad'z, Phoenix Cobras, Portland Rage, Edmonton Sled Dogs, and Sacramento River Rats. They finish atop their division, as well as second overall in the Western Conference, behind the Los Angeles Blades. The Voodoo's leading scorer was Ryan Harrison, who finished with 62 points in 22 games, good for 15th overall in the league.

In the playoffs, the Voodoo were once again defeated in the first round, ousted by Portland in two games; the VooDoo lost the first game in an 8-7 shootout at Portland before being eliminated in game two in Vancouver by a score of 14-8.

The Voodoo's average attendance rises to 4,600 as they begin playing games at the Pacific Coliseum – in close vicinity to the PNE Agrodome – as well.

=== 1995 ===
The Voodoo finish atop their division and second in their conference for the third straight season. Ryan Harrison leads Vancouver in scoring again with 63 points in 24 games, 15th overall in the league once more.

In the playoffs, Vancouver makes it out of the first round for the first time, defeating the Oakland Skates by a score of 10-4. The playoff bid was halted in the second round by the San Jose Rhinos, the inevitable Murphy Cup champions.

As the Voodoo fully relocated to the Pacific Coliseum, their average attendance rose again to nearly 5,300, third-highest in the league.

=== 1996 ===
The Voodoo relocated again to the Vancouver Canucks' home stadium General Motors Place, and the average attendance peaks at 5,500. Vancouver's Doug Ast finished second overall in the league in regular season scoring with 91 points in 28 games. Vancouver won their division for the fourth consecutive season, but are eliminated in the second round in three games by the Anaheim Bullfrogs.

At the end of the 1996 season, the Vancouver Voodoo franchise folded after four years.

== Regular season records ==
For the four seasons played by the VooDoo, the team's regular season records were:

Season	GP	W	L	OTL	Pts	Pct	GF	GA	PIM
1993	14	11	2	1	23	0.821	160	91	350
1994	22	15	6	1	31	0.705	188	157	412
1995	24	13	10	1	27	0.563	203	185	459
1996	28	18	7	3	39	0.696	217	162	665
