= 1973 Rothmans International Vancouver =

- Date: 25 March – 1 April
- Edition: 4th
- Category: World Championship Tennis (WCT, Group B)
- Draw: 32S / 16D
- Prize money: $50,000
- Surface: Carpet / indoor
- Location: Vancouver, BC, Canada
- Venue: PNE Agrodome

Champions

Singles
- (United States) Tom Gorman

Doubles
- (France) Pierre Barthès / (United Kingdom) Roger Taylor
- Vancouver WCT

The 1973 Rothmans International Vancouver, also known as the Vancouver WCT, was a men's professional tennis tournament that was part of Group B of the 1973 World Championship Tennis circuit. It was held on indoor carpet courts at the PNE Agrodome in Vancouver, British Columbia in Canada. It was the fourth and final edition of the tournament and was held from 25 March through 1 April 1973. Unseeded Tom Gorman won the singles title and earned $10,000 first-prize money.

== Finals ==
=== Singles ===
(United States) Tom Gorman defeated (Czechoslovakia) Jan Kodeš 3–6, 6–2, 7–5

- It was Gorman's 1st singles title of the year and the 2nd of his career.

=== Doubles ===
(France) Pierre Barthès / (United Kingdom) Roger Taylor defeated (United States) Erik van Dillen / (United States) Tom Gorman 5–7, 6–3, 7–6
