= 1971 Redwood Bank Pacific Coast Open – Singles =

Singles
- 1971 Redwood Bank Pacific Coast Open

Final
- Champion: (Australia) Rod Laver
- Runner-up: (Australia) Ken Rosewall
- Score: 6–4, 6–4, 7–6

Details
- Draw: 64
- Seeds: 8

Events
Singles	Doubles
← 1970 ·	Pacific Coast Championships	· 1972 →

The 1971 Redwood Bank Pacific Coast Open – Singles was an event of the 1971 Redwood Bank Pacific Coast Open men's tennis tournament and was played on outdoor hard courts at the Berkeley Tennis Club in Berkeley, California in the United States between September 27 and October 3, 1971. The draw comprised 64 players, and eight players were seeded. Arthur Ashe was the defending singles champion but lost in the semifinals. First-seeded Rod Laver won the title by defeating fourth-seeded Ken Rosewall in the final, 6–4, 6–4, 7–6.

== Seeds ==
1. (Australia) Rod Laver (champion)
2. (South Africa) Cliff Drysdale (quarterfinals)
3. (Netherlands) Tom Okker (semifinals)
4. (Australia) Ken Rosewall (final)
5. (Czechoslovakia) Jan Kodeš (third round)
6. (United States) Arthur Ashe (semifinals)
7. (United States) Marty Riessen (quarterfinals)
8. (United States) Cliff Richey (quarterfinals)

Click on the seed number of a player to go to their draw section.

== Draw ==
=== Key ===
- Q = Qualifier
- WC = Wild card
- LL = Lucky loser
- Alt = Alternate
- ITF = ITF entry
- PR = Protected ranking
- SR = Special ranking
- SE = Special exempt
- JE = Junior exempt
- JR = Junior Accelerator Programme entrant
- CO = College Accelerator Programme entrant
- NG = Next Gen Accelerator Program entrant
- w/o = Walkover
- r = Retired
- d = Defaulted

=== Finals ===
Quarterfinals
1	(Australia) Rod Laver	7	2	6
(United States) Bob Lutz	6	6	4
3	(Netherlands) Tom Okker	3	6	6
8	(United States) Cliff Richey	6	2	2
7	(United States) Marty Riessen	1	3
4	(Australia) Ken Rosewall	6	6
6	(United States) Arthur Ashe	6	6
2	(South Africa) Cliff Drysdale	2	2

Semifinals
1	(Australia) Rod Laver	4	7	6
3	(Netherlands) Tom Okker	6	5	4
4	(Australia) Ken Rosewall	7	6
6	(United States) Arthur Ashe	5	4

Final
1	(Australia) Rod Laver	6	6	7
4	(Australia) Ken Rosewall	4	4	6

=== Top half ===
==== Section 1 ====
First Round
1	(Australia) Rod Laver	6	5	6
(South Africa) Frew McMillan	2	7	3
(United States) Larry Dodge	3	4
Q	(United States) Alex Olmedo	6	6
(Pakistan) Haroon Rahim	6	6
(Chile) Patricio Cornejo	2	2
(Australia) Ray Keldie	4	2
(Australia) Roy Emerson	6	6
5	(Czechoslovakia) Jan Kodeš	6	6
Q	(United States) Steve Cornell	1	1
(United States) Roy Barth	7	0
(Egypt) Ismail El Shafei	6	0^{r}
(Australia) John Cooper	2	1
(United States) Bob Lutz	6	6
(Australia) Terry Addison	6	6
(Sweden) Ove Bengtson	4	2

Second Round
1	(Australia) Rod Laver	6	6
Q	(United States) Alex Olmedo	4	1
(Pakistan) Haroon Rahim	3	4
(Australia) Roy Emerson	6	6
5	(Czechoslovakia) Jan Kodeš	7	6
(United States) Roy Barth	5	1
(United States) Bob Lutz	6	6
(Australia) Terry Addison	3	2

Third Round
1	(Australia) Rod Laver	6	6	6
(Australia) Roy Emerson	7	4	0
5	(Czechoslovakia) Jan Kodeš	6	4	3
(United States) Bob Lutz	4	6	6

Quarterfinals
1	(Australia) Rod Laver	7	2	6
(United States) Bob Lutz	6	6	4

==== Section 2 ====
First Round
3	(Netherlands) Tom Okker	6	4	6
(Australia) Bill Bowrey	3	6	4
(Denmark) Torben Ulrich	2	6	4
(New Zealand) Brian Fairlie	6	4	6
(South Africa) Terry Ryan	6	2
(United States) Jim Osborne	7	6
Q	(United States) Charles Darley	6	1
(Australia) Ray Ruffels	7	6
8	(United States) Cliff Richey	6	6
(Australia) Bob Carmichael	4	2
(Australia) Owen Davidson	3	3
(United Kingdom) Roger Taylor	6	6
(Australia) John Alexander	4	3
(South Africa) Raymond Moore	6	6
Q	(United States) Rick Fisher	3	3
(United Kingdom) Mark Cox	6	6

Second Round
3	(Netherlands) Tom Okker	6	6	6
(New Zealand) Brian Fairlie	3	7	1
(United States) Jim Osborne	7	4	6
(Australia) Ray Ruffels	5	6	7
8	(United States) Cliff Richey	7	4	6
(United Kingdom) Roger Taylor	6	6	3
(South Africa) Raymond Moore	7	6
(United Kingdom) Mark Cox	5	3

Third Round
3	(Netherlands) Tom Okker	6	7
(Australia) Ray Ruffels	4	6
8	(United States) Cliff Richey	4	6	6
(South Africa) Raymond Moore	6	2	1

Quarterfinals
3	(Netherlands) Tom Okker	3	6	6
8	(United States) Cliff Richey	6	2	2

=== Bottom half ===
==== Section 3 ====
First Round
(United States) Tom Leonard	6	3	6
(Australia) Allan Stone	2	6	4
(South Africa) Bob Maud	6	3	6
(France) Pierre Barthès	3	6	2
(Mexico) Joaquín Loyo-Mayo	4	6	6
(United States) Barry MacKay (tennis)	6	2	3
Q	(United States) Charles Hoeveler	4	3
7	(United States) Marty Riessen	6	6
(New Zealand) Onny Parun	6	3	6
Q	(Australia) Ross Case	3	6	7
(Spain) Andrés Gimeno	6	7
(United Kingdom) Graham Stilwell	3	5
(United States) Tom Brown	6	6
(Czechoslovakia) Milan Holeček	4	2
(United States) Tom Edlefsen	1	2
4	(Australia) Ken Rosewall	6	6

Second Round
(United States) Tom Leonard	3	4
(South Africa) Bob Maud	6	6
(Mexico) Joaquín Loyo-Mayo	6	4	4
7	(United States) Marty Riessen	4	6	6
Q	(Australia) Ross Case	2	6
(Spain) Andrés Gimeno	6	7
(United States) Tom Brown	3	2
4	(Australia) Ken Rosewall	6	6

Third Round
(South Africa) Bob Maud	3	6	4
7	(United States) Marty Riessen	6	2	6
(Spain) Andrés Gimeno	5	3
4	(Australia) Ken Rosewall	7	6

Quarterfinals
7	(United States) Marty Riessen	1	3
4	(Australia) Ken Rosewall	6	6

==== Section 4 ====
First Round
Q	(United States) Richard Anderson	2	0
(Chile) Jaime Fillol	6	6
(Australia) Fred Stolle	2	4
(United States) Jeff Borowiak	6	6
(United States) Jim McManus	0	0
(Rhodesia) Andrew Pattison	6	6
(Czechoslovakia) Vladimír Zedník	6	4	4
6	(United States) Arthur Ashe	2	6	6
Q	(United States) Steve Krulevitz	4	4
(United States) Charlie Pasarell	6	6
(Socialist Federal Republic of Yugoslavia) Nikola Pilić	6	6
(United States) Mike Estep	3	3
(Jamaica) Richard Russell	3	6	5
(Australia) Colin Dibley	6	4	7
(Australia) Phil Dent	1	2
2	(South Africa) Cliff Drysdale	6	6

Second Round
(Chile) Jaime Fillol	1	6	7
(United States) Jeff Borowiak	6	2	5
(Rhodesia) Andrew Pattison	6	6
6	(United States) Arthur Ashe	7	7
(United States) Charlie Pasarell	5	2
(Socialist Federal Republic of Yugoslavia) Nikola Pilić	7	6
(Australia) Colin Dibley	7	3	3
2	(South Africa) Cliff Drysdale	6	6	6

Third Round
(Chile) Jaime Fillol	4	6	2
6	(United States) Arthur Ashe	6	3	6
(Socialist Federal Republic of Yugoslavia) Nikola Pilić	6	3
2	(South Africa) Cliff Drysdale	7	6

Quarterfinals
6	(United States) Arthur Ashe	6	6
2	(South Africa) Cliff Drysdale	2	2
