= 1973 Pacific Coast Open =

- Date: September 23–30
- Edition: 85th
- Category: Grand Prix (Grade B)
- Draw: 32S / 16D
- Prize money: $50,000
- Surface: Hard / outdoor
- Location: San Francisco, U.S.
- Venue: Round Hill Country Club

Champions

Singles
- (Australia) Roy Emerson

Doubles
- (Australia) Roy Emerson / (United States) Stan Smith
← 1972 ·	Pacific Coast Championships	· 1974 →

The 1973 Pacific Coast Open, also known by its sponsored name Fireman's Fund International, was a men's tennis tournament that was part of the Grade B category of the 1973 Grand Prix circuit. The event was played on outdoor hard courts at the Round Hill Country Club in Alamo in the San Francisco Bay Area, United States. It was the 85th edition of the tournament and was held from September 23 through September 30, 1973. Fourth-seeded Roy Emerson won the singles title and the accompanying $9,000 first-prize money and 40 Grand Prix points.

== Finals ==
=== Singles ===
(Australia) Roy Emerson defeated (Sweden) Björn Borg 5–7, 6–1, 6–4

=== Doubles ===
(Australia) Roy Emerson / (United States) Stan Smith defeated (Sweden) Ove Nils Bengtson / (United States) Jim McManus 6–2, 6–1
