= 1971 Rothmans International Vancouver – Doubles =

Tennis tournament event

Doubles
- 1971 Rothmans International Vancouver

Final
- Champion: (Australia) Roy Emerson (Australia) Rod Laver
- Runner-up: (Australia) John Alexander (Australia) Phil Dent
- Score: 5–7, 6–7, 6–0, 7–5, 7–6

Details
- Draw: 15

Events
Singles	Doubles
Vancouver WCT	· 1972 →

The 1971 Rothmans International Vancouver – Doubles was an event of the 1971 Rothmans International Vancouver tennis tournament played at the PNE Agrodome in Vancouver, Canada from 3 October through 11 October 1971. Roy Emerson and Rod Laver were the defending doubles champions and retained the title, defeating John Alexander and Phil Dent in the final, 5–7, 6–7, 6–0, 7–5, 7–6.

== Draw ==
=== Key ===
- Q = Qualifier
- WC = Wild card
- LL = Lucky loser
- Alt = Alternate
- ITF = ITF entry
- PR = Protected ranking
- SR = Special ranking
- SE = Special exempt
- JE = Junior exempt
- JR = Junior Accelerator Programme entrant
- CO = College Accelerator Programme entrant
- NG = Next Gen Accelerator Program entrant
- w/o = Walkover
- r = Retired
- d = Defaulted

First Round
(United States) Roy Barth (Denmark) Torben Ulrich	7	6
(Netherlands) Tom Okker (United States) Marty Riessen	6	4
(United States) Arthur Ashe (United States) Bob Lutz	1	7	6
(United Kingdom) Mark Cox (United Kingdom) Graham Stilwell	6	5	3
(Australia) Bob Carmichael (Australia) Ray Ruffels	6	7
(South Africa) Bob Maud (Australia) Allan Stone	3	6
(Australia) Ken Rosewall (Australia) Fred Stolle	7	6
(United States) Ronald Holmberg (South Africa) Frew McMillan	6	3
(Australia) Bill Bowrey (Australia) Owen Davidson	6	7
(Spain) Andrés Gimeno (United States) Charlie Pasarell	4	6
(South Africa) Cliff Drysdale (Socialist Federal Republic of Yugoslavia) Nikola Pilić	7	7
(Egypt) Ismail El Shafei (New Zealand) Brian Fairlie	6	6
(Australia) Roy Emerson (Australia) Rod Laver	6	6
(United States) Tom Leonard (South Africa) Terry Ryan	2	4

Quarterfinals
(United States) Roy Barth (Denmark) Torben Ulrich	6	5	6
(United States) Arthur Ashe (United States) Bob Lutz	3	7	4
(Australia) John Alexander (Australia) Phil Dent	6	7
(Australia) Bob Carmichael (Australia) Ray Ruffels	4	6
(Australia) Ken Rosewall (Australia) Fred Stolle	6	6
(Australia) Bill Bowrey (Australia) Owen Davidson	3	1
(South Africa) Cliff Drysdale (Socialist Federal Republic of Yugoslavia) Nikola Pilić	6	5	4
(Australia) Roy Emerson (Australia) Rod Laver	2	7	6

Semifinals
(United States) Roy Barth (Denmark) Torben Ulrich	6	4
(Australia) John Alexander (Australia) Phil Dent	7	6
(Australia) Ken Rosewall (Australia) Fred Stolle	3	6
(Australia) Roy Emerson (Australia) Rod Laver	6	7

Final
(Australia) John Alexander (Australia) Phil Dent	7	7	0	5	6
(Australia) Roy Emerson (Australia) Rod Laver	5	6	6	7	7
