= 1973 Pacific Coast Open – Doubles =

Doubles
- 1973 Pacific Coast Open

Final
- Champion: (Australia) Roy Emerson (United States) Stan Smith
- Runner-up: (Sweden) Ove Nils Bengtson (United States) Jim McManus
- Score: 6–2, 6–1

Details
- Draw: 16
- Seeds: 4

Events
Singles	Doubles
← 1972 ·	Pacific Coast Championships	· 1974 →

The 1973 Pacific Coast Open – Doubles was an event of the 1973 Pacific Coast Open tennis tournament and was played on outdoor hard courts at the Round Hill Country Club in Alamo in the San Francisco Bay Area in the United States between September 23 and September 30, 1973. Frew McMillan and Bob Hewitt were the defending Pacific Coast Championships doubles champions but did not compete together in this edition. Third-seeded Roy Emerson and Stan Smith won the title by defeating unseeded Ove Nils Bengtson and Jim McManus in the final, 6–2, 6–1.

== Seeds ==
1. (United States) Arthur Ashe / (United States) Roscoe Tanner (semifinals)
2. (Australia) Bob Carmichael / (South Africa) Frew McMillan (semifinals)
3. (Australia) Roy Emerson / (United States) Stan Smith (champions)
4. (Sweden) Ove Bengtson / (United States) Jim McManus (final)

== Draw ==
=== Key ===
- Q = Qualifier
- WC = Wild card
- LL = Lucky loser
- Alt = Alternate
- ITF = ITF entry
- PR = Protected ranking
- SR = Special ranking
- SE = Special exempt
- JE = Junior exempt
- JR = Junior Accelerator Programme entrant
- CO = College Accelerator Programme entrant
- NG = Next Gen Accelerator Program entrant
- w/o = Walkover
- r = Retired
- d = Defaulted

First Round
2	(Australia) Bob Carmichael (South Africa) Frew McMillan	3	6	6
(Australia) Paul Kronk (Australia) Harold Turnbull	6	3	4
(United States) Tom Edlefsen (Czechoslovakia) Milan Holeček	7	3	6
(Sweden) Björn Borg (Sweden) Rolf Norberg	6	6	4
3	(Australia) Roy Emerson (United States) Stan Smith	7	6
(United States) Mike Estep (United States) Fred McNair	5	3
(United States) Charlie Pasarell (Mexico) Raúl Ramírez	6	6
Unknown; Unknown	4	4
(Australia) John Alexander (Pakistan) Haroon Rahim	5	6	6
(United States) Dave Bohrnstedt (United States) Mike Machette	7	3	7
(United States) Rick Fisher; Unknown	4	2
4	(Sweden) Ove Bengtson (United States) Jim McManus	6	6
(United Kingdom) John Lloyd (New Zealand) Jeff Simpson	3	7	6
(South Africa) Raymond Moore (New Zealand) Onny Parun	6	5	7
(United States) Henry Kamakana (United States) Greg Shephard	4	2
1	(United States) Arthur Ashe (United States) Roscoe Tanner	6	6

Quarterfinals
2	(Australia) Bob Carmichael (South Africa) Frew McMillan	6	6
(United States) Tom Edlefsen (Czechoslovakia) Milan Holeček	0	3
3	(Australia) Roy Emerson (United States) Stan Smith	6	3	6
(United States) Charlie Pasarell (Mexico) Raúl Ramírez	3	6	3
(United States) Dave Bohrnstedt (United States) Mike Machette	4	4
4	(Sweden) Ove Bengtson (United States) Jim McManus	6	6
(South Africa) Raymond Moore (New Zealand) Onny Parun	6	6	5
1	(United States) Arthur Ashe (United States) Roscoe Tanner	7	3	7

Semifinals
2	(Australia) Bob Carmichael (South Africa) Frew McMillan	6	2	1
3	(Australia) Roy Emerson (United States) Stan Smith	2	6	6
4	(Sweden) Ove Bengtson (United States) Jim McManus	6	6
1	(United States) Arthur Ashe (United States) Roscoe Tanner	4	4

Final
3	(Australia) Roy Emerson (United States) Stan Smith	6	6
4	(Sweden) Ove Bengtson (United States) Jim McManus	2	1
