= 1971 Redwood Bank Pacific Coast Open =

- Date: September 27 – October 3
- Edition: 83rd
- Category: Grand Prix / WCT
- Draw: 64S / 32D
- Prize money: $50,000
- Surface: Hard / outdoor
- Location: Berkeley, California, U.S.
- Venue: Berkeley Tennis Club

Champions

Singles
- (Australia) Rod Laver

Doubles
- (Australia) Roy Emerson / (Australia) Rod Laver
← 1970 ·	Pacific Coast Championships	· 1972 →

The 1971 Redwood Bank Pacific Coast Open was a men's tennis tournament played on outdoor hard courts at the Berkeley Tennis Club in Berkeley, California in the United States. The event was part of both the 1971 Grand Prix and World Championship Tennis circuit. It was the 83rd edition of the tournament and ran from September 27 through October 3, 1971. First-seeded Rod Laver won the singles title and earned $10,000 first-prize money.

== Finals ==
=== Singles ===
(Australia) Rod Laver defeated (Australia) Ken Rosewall 6–4, 6–4, 7–6

- It was Laver's 6th singles title of the year and the 35th of his career in the Open Era.

=== Doubles ===
(Australia) Roy Emerson / (Australia) Rod Laver defeated (Australia) Ken Rosewall / (Australia) Fred Stolle 6–3, 6–3

== See also ==
- Laver–Rosewall rivalry
