= Oakland Skates =

- City: Oakland, California
- Founded: 1993
- Home arena: Oakland–Alameda County Coliseum Arena (1993 - 1995); Henry J. Kaiser Arena (1996)
- Colors: Blue, Gold, White (1993) Purple, Jade, Black, White (1994 - 1996)
- Murphy Cups: None
- Conference Championships: None
- Division Championships: None

Franchise history
- Oakland Skates (1993 - 1996)

The Oakland Skates were a professional roller hockey team and were a member team in Roller Hockey International (RHI) from 1993 through 1996. In 1993 the Skates were a finalist for the RHI league championship, named the Murphy Cup, for one of the league founders, Dennis Murphy, losing to the Anaheim Bullfrogs. After two mediocre seasons in 1994 and 1995 the Skates returned to the playoffs in 1996 losing to the Vancouver Voodoo.

The Skates played their home games in Oakland, California at the Oakland–Alameda County Coliseum Arena from 1993 until 1995, until having to move to the Henry J. Kaiser Arena in 1996 due to the remodeling of the Oakland–Alameda County Coliseum arena (now called Oakland Arena) for the Golden State Warriors. Skates majority owner Murray Simkin was unwilling to keep the Skates in their temporary home (which opened in 1914) for another season, waiting for the arena remodeling to finish and went on league "hiatus" status after the 1996 season. The team never returned to play.

The Skates qualified for the playoffs for the Murphy Cup in 1993 making it to the finals by beating St. Louis and Calgary before being swept by Anaheim in a two-game series, losing the final by a 9-4 score. In 1994 they didn't make the playoffs in the expanded league of 24 teams. The 1995 season saw a contraction of the league to 18 teams with the Skates finishing 2nd in their division (with a record of 10-10-4 after a 1-6 start) and qualifying for the playoff again but losing in the first round to the Vancouver VooDoo by a score of 10-4. Their cross bay rivals the San Jose Rhino's ended up winning the title against Montreal. In 1996, the team made it to the playoffs, but were knocked off by Vancouver for a second consecutive season, losing by a score of 12-3.
