= 1973 Pacific Coast Open – Singles =

Singles
- 1973 Pacific Coast Open

Final
- Champion: (Australia) Roy Emerson
- Runner-up: (Sweden) Björn Borg
- Score: 5–7, 6–1, 6–4

Details
- Draw: 32
- Seeds: 8

Events
Singles	Doubles
- Pacific Coast Championships

The 1973 Pacific Coast Open – Singles was an event of the 1973 Pacific Coast Open tennis tournament and was played on outdoor hard courts at the Round Hill Country Club in Alamo in the San Francisco Bay Area in the United States between September 23 and September 30, 1973. Jimmy Connors was the defending Pacific Coast Championships champion but did not take part in this edition. Fourth-seeded Roy Emerson won the title by defeating sixth-seeded Björn Borg 5–7, 6–1, 6–4 in the final.

== Seeds ==
1. (United States) Stan Smith (quarterfinals)
2. (United States) Arthur Ashe (semifinals)
3. (United States) Tom Gorman (quarterfinals)
4. (Australia) Roy Emerson (champion)
5. (United States) Roscoe Tanner (quarterfinals)
6. (Sweden) Björn Borg (final)
7. (South Africa) Cliff Drysdale (second round)
8. (Australia) John Alexander (quarterfinals)

== Draw ==
Key

- Q = Qualifier
- WC = Wild card
- LL = Lucky loser
- Alt = Alternate
- ITF = ITF entry
- PR = Protected ranking
- SR = Special ranking
- SE = Special exempt
- JE = Junior exempt
- JR = Junior Accelerator Programme entrant
- CO = College Accelerator Programme entrant
- NG = Next Gen Accelerator Program entrant
- w/o = Walkover
- r = Retired
- d = Defaulted

=== Finals ===
Semifinals
(South Africa) Ray Moore	3	3
6	(Sweden) Björn Borg	6	6
4	(Australia) Roy Emerson	5	6	6
2	(United States) Arthur Ashe	7	2	1

Final
6	(Sweden) Björn Borg	7	1	4
4	(Australia) Roy Emerson	5	6	6

=== Top half ===
First Round
1	(United States) Stan Smith	6	6
(United States) Rick Fisher	2	3
(New Zealand) Onny Parun	7	6
(United States) Paul Gerken	6	4
7	(South Africa) Cliff Drysdale	6	7
(United States) Mike Estep	2	5
(Australia) Bob Carmichael	6	3
(South Africa) Ray Moore	7	6
3	(United States) Tom Gorman	6	6
(United States) Jim Delaney	3	3
(United States) Guillermo Oropez	3	3
(Mexico) Raúl Ramírez	6	6
6	(Sweden) Björn Borg	3	7	7
(Czechoslovakia) Milan Holeček	6	6	6
(Czechoslovakia) Vladimír Zedník	3	7	1
(Spain) Manuel Santana	6	6	0^{r}

Second Round
1	(United States) Stan Smith	7	4	6
(New Zealand) Onny Parun	6	6	4
7	(South Africa) Cliff Drysdale	4	3
(South Africa) Ray Moore	6	6
3	(United States) Tom Gorman	3	7	6
(Mexico) Raúl Ramírez	6	6	0
6	(Sweden) Björn Borg	6	6
(Czechoslovakia) Vladimír Zedník	4	0

Quarterfinals
1	(United States) Stan Smith	6	4
(South Africa) Ray Moore	7	6
3	(United States) Tom Gorman	4	7	6
6	(Sweden) Björn Borg	6	5	7

Semifinals
(South Africa) Ray Moore	3	3
6	(Sweden) Björn Borg	6	6

=== Bottom half ===
First Round
(United States) Jeff Borowiak	6	6
(United States) Fred McNair	3	1
(United States) Greg Shephard	3	4
5	(United States) Roscoe Tanner	6	6
(Pakistan) Haroon Rahim	5	5
(United States) Jeff Austin	7	7
(United States) Tom Edlefsen	2	3
4	(Australia) Roy Emerson	6	6
(South Africa) Frew McMillan	5	7	4
(United States) Charlie Pasarell	7	5	6
(New Zealand) Jeff Simpson	4	1
8	(Australia) John Alexander	6	6
(Sweden) Ove Bengtson	6	5
(United States) Dick R. Bohrnstedt	7	7
(United Kingdom) John Lloyd	3	3
2	(United States) Arthur Ashe	6	6

Second Round
(United States) Jeff Borowiak	2	4
5	(United States) Roscoe Tanner	6	6
(United States) Jeff Austin	4	7	3
4	(Australia) Roy Emerson	6	6	6
(United States) Charlie Pasarell	6	4
8	(Australia) John Alexander	7	6
(United States) Dick R. Bohrnstedt	4	4
2	(United States) Arthur Ashe	6	6

Quarterfinals
5	(United States) Roscoe Tanner	7	5	2
4	(Australia) Roy Emerson	5	7	6
8	(Australia) John Alexander	5	6	6
2	(United States) Arthur Ashe	7	1	7

Semifinals
4	(Australia) Roy Emerson	5	6	6
2	(United States) Arthur Ashe	7	2	1
