= 1971 Redwood Bank Pacific Coast Open – Doubles =

Doubles
- 1971 Redwood Bank Pacific Coast Open

Final
- Champion: (Australia) Roy Emerson (Australia) Rod Laver
- Runner-up: (Australia) Ken Rosewall (Australia) Fred Stolle
- Score: 6–3, 6–3

Details
- Draw: 32
- Seeds: 2

Events
Singles	Doubles
← 1970 ·	Pacific Coast Championships	· 1972 →

The 1971 Redwood Bank Pacific Coast Open – Doubles was an event of the 1971 Redwood Bank Pacific Coast Open men's tennis tournament and was played on outdoor hard courts at the Berkeley Tennis Club in Berkeley, California in the United States between September 27 and October 3, 1971. The draw comprised 32 teams and two were seeded. Bob Lutz and Stan Smith were the defending doubles champion but did not compete together in this edition. Second-seeded Roy Emerson and Rod Laver won the doubles title by defeating unseeded Ken Rosewall and Fred Stolle in the final, 6–3, 6–3.

== Seeds ==
1. (Netherlands) Tom Okker / (United States) Marty Riessen (Semifinals)
2. (Australia) Roy Emerson / (Australia) Rod Laver (Champions)

== Draw ==
=== Key ===
- Q = Qualifier
- WC = Wild card
- LL = Lucky loser
- Alt = Alternate
- ITF = ITF entry
- PR = Protected ranking
- SR = Special ranking
- SE = Special exempt
- JE = Junior exempt
- JR = Junior Accelerator Programme entrant
- CO = College Accelerator Programme entrant
- NG = Next Gen Accelerator Program entrant
- w/o = Walkover
- r = Retired
- d = Defaulted

=== Finals ===
Semifinals
1	(Netherlands) Tom Okker (United States) Marty Riessen	5	4
(Australia) Ken Rosewall (Australia) Fred Stolle	7	6
(Australia) John Alexander (Australia) Phil Dent	6	3	4
2	(Australia) Roy Emerson (Australia) Rod Laver	2	6	6

Final
(Australia) Ken Rosewall (Australia) Fred Stolle	3	3
2	(Australia) Roy Emerson (Australia) Rod Laver	6	6

=== Top half ===
First Round
1	(Netherlands) Tom Okker (United States) Marty Riessen	6	4	6
(Czechoslovakia) Milan Holeček (United States) Tom Leonard	4	6	3
(South Africa) Cliff Drysdale (Socialist Federal Republic of Yugoslavia) Nikola Pilić	7	6
(Australia) William Lloyd (United States) Terry Moor	5	1
(Czechoslovakia) Jan Kodeš (Czechoslovakia) Vladimír Zedník	7	6
(Australia) Terry Addison (United States) Alex Olmedo	6	3
(Australia) Bill Bowrey (Australia) Owen Davidson	6	6
(United States) Richard Anderson (United States) Lever	3	2
(South Africa) Bob Maud (Australia) Allan Stone	6	6
(United States) Bob Lutz (United States) Charlie Pasarell	4	4
(Australia) John Cooper (Australia) Colin Dibley	5	6	6
(United States) Hugh Ditzler (United States) Clifton Mayne	7	2	4
(Australia) Ken Rosewall (Australia) Fred Stolle	6	6
(United States) Roy Barth (Denmark) Torben Ulrich	4	2
(United States) Henry Kamakana (United States) Greg Shephard	7	3	6
(New Zealand) Brian Fairlie (South Africa) Raymond Moore	6	6	3

Second Round
1	(Netherlands) Tom Okker (United States) Marty Riessen	6	6
(South Africa) Cliff Drysdale (Socialist Federal Republic of Yugoslavia) Nikola Pilić	2	4
(Czechoslovakia) Jan Kodeš (Czechoslovakia) Vladimír Zedník
(Australia) Bill Bowrey (Australia) Owen Davidson	w/o
(South Africa) Bob Maud (Australia) Allan Stone	6	7
(Australia) John Cooper (Australia) Colin Dibley	4	6
(Australia) Ken Rosewall (Australia) Fred Stolle	6	6
(United States) Henry Kamakana (United States) Greg Shephard	4	2

Quarterfinals
1	(Netherlands) Tom Okker (United States) Marty Riessen	6	6	6
(Australia) Bill Bowrey (Australia) Owen Davidson	7	4	4
(South Africa) Bob Maud (Australia) Allan Stone	7	3	2
(Australia) Ken Rosewall (Australia) Fred Stolle	6	6	6

Semifinals
1	(Netherlands) Tom Okker (United States) Marty Riessen	5	4
(Australia) Ken Rosewall (Australia) Fred Stolle	7	6

=== Bottom half ===
First Round
(Australia) John Alexander (Australia) Phil Dent	7	7
(United States) Steve Cornell (United States) Eugene Cantin	6	5
(Spain) Andrés Gimeno (United States) Cliff Richey	3	6	6
(Australia) Ross Case (Australia) Geoff Masters	6	4	2
(United States) Arthur Ashe (South Africa) Frew McMillan	6	6
(United States) Tom Brown (United States) Turner Howard	2	3
(Australia) Bob Carmichael (Australia) Ray Ruffels	6	6
(United Kingdom) Mark Cox (United Kingdom) Graham Stilwell	4	4
(Sweden) Ove Bengtson (Australia) Ray Keldie	7	6
(United States) Dean Penero (United States) John Penero	6	4
(United States) Mike Estep (South Africa) Terry Ryan	6	6	6
(United States) Jim McManus (United States) Jim Osborne	4	7	4
(United States) Tom Edlefsen (Zimbabwe) Andrew Pattison	6	6
(United States) Dan Bleckinger (United States) Len Saputo	3	3
(United States) Jeff Borowiak (Pakistan) Haroon Rahim	5	7	2
2	(Australia) Roy Emerson (Australia) Rod Laver	7	6	6

Second Round
(Australia) John Alexander (Australia) Phil Dent	6	6
(Spain) Andrés Gimeno (United States) Cliff Richey	3	2
(United States) Arthur Ashe (South Africa) Frew McMillan	6	6
(Australia) Bob Carmichael (Australia) Ray Ruffels	4	4
(Sweden) Ove Bengtson (Australia) Ray Keldie	6	7	6
(United States) Mike Estep (South Africa) Terry Ryan	7	6	3
(United States) Tom Edlefsen (Zimbabwe) Andrew Pattison	6	2	2
2	(Australia) Roy Emerson (Australia) Rod Laver	2	6	6

Quarterfinals
(Australia) John Alexander (Australia) Phil Dent	6	6	7
(United States) Arthur Ashe (South Africa) Frew McMillan	1	7	6
(Sweden) Ove Bengtson (Australia) Ray Keldie	3	2
2	(Australia) Roy Emerson (Australia) Rod Laver	6	6

Semifinals
(Australia) John Alexander (Australia) Phil Dent	6	3	4
2	(Australia) Roy Emerson (Australia) Rod Laver	2	6	6
