= Oakland Arena =

Indoor arena in California, US

- The Arena; The O Roaracle

- Exterior view (c. 2024)

- Location in Oakland Location in California Location in the United States
- Former names: Oakland–Alameda County Coliseum Arena (1966–1996); The Arena in Oakland (1997–2005); Oracle Arena (2006–2019)
- Address: 7000 Coliseum Way
- Location: Oakland, California
- Coordinates: 37°45′1″N 122°12′11″W
- Owner: Oakland-Alameda County Coliseum Authority (City of Oakland and Alameda County)
- Operator: AEG / ASM Global
- Capacity: Concerts and basketball: 19,596
- Public transit: AC Transit: 45, 46L, 73, 90, 98, 646, 657, 805; Alameda County East Oakland Shuttle; Amtrak: Capitol Corridor at Oakland Coliseum; BART: at Coliseum; Harbor Bay Business Park Shuttle

Construction
- Groundbreaking: April 15, 1964
- Opened: November 9, 1966
- Renovated: 1996–97
- Cost: US$24 million (original) $121 million (1996–97 renovation)
- Architects: Skidmore, Owings and Merrill; HNTB (renovation)
- General contractor: Guy F. Atkinson Company

Tenants
- California Seals (WHL) 1966–1967; Oakland Oaks (ABA) 1967–1969; California Golden Seals (NHL) 1970–1976; Golden State Warriors (NBA) 1971–2019; San Francisco Golden Gaters (WTT) 1974–1978; Golden Bay Earthquakes (NASL/MISL) 1982–1984; Oakland Skates (RHI) 1993–1995; California Golden Bears (NCAA) 1997–1999

Oakland Arena, often referred to as the Oakland Coliseum Arena, is a multi-purpose indoor arena in Oakland, California, United States, and one of two venues within the Oakland–Alameda County Coliseum Complex.

Opened in 1966, the Oakland Arena was originally the location of the California Seals of the Western Hockey League (WHL), later of the National Hockey League (NHL), until their move to Cleveland in 1976.

The arena served as home to the Golden State Warriors of the National Basketball Association (NBA) from 1971 to 2019, excluding a period of extensive renovations during the 1996–97 NBA season.

== History ==
=== Home franchises ===
The arena was the home of the Golden State Warriors from 1971 to 2019; for the 1996–97 season, however, the team played at San Jose Arena while Oakland Arena underwent extensive renovations. The California Golden Bears of the Pac-10 played the 1997–98 and 1998–99 seasons at the arena while their primary home, Harmon Gym, was being renovated into Haas Pavilion. For some years before then, the Bears played occasional games against popular non-conference opponents at the arena.

Oracle Arena has hosted games of the NBA Finals in 2015, 2016, 2017, 2018, and 2019, where the Warriors won the NBA championship in 2015, 2017, and 2018. That 2015 title was the first time since 1975 the Warriors won the title; however, Games 2 and 3 of the 1975 NBA Finals were played at the Cow Palace in Daly City, as the Coliseum was unavailable at the time. The 2017 championship was the first time that a Bay Area team won a title in their home venue since the Oakland Athletics in the 1974 World Series.

The arena's first tenants were the California Seals of the Western Hockey League, who moved across the bay from the Cow Palace in 1966. The owners of the San Francisco Seals had been awarded an expansion franchise in the National Hockey League, on the condition they move out of the Cow Palace and into the then-new Oakland Coliseum Arena. The team changed its operating name from San Francisco Seals to California Seals in order to draw fans from both San Francisco and Oakland. The California Golden Seals continued to play at the arena after having transferred to the NHL, until the team moved to Cleveland after the 1975–76 NHL season.

The Coliseum hosted the American Basketball Association's Oakland Oaks (1967–1969), a charter member of the new ABA in 1967. The Oaks signed San Francisco Warriors star Rick Barry away from the rival National Basketball Association in 1968. The team was owned by entertainer Pat Boone and also had stars Larry Brown and Doug Moe on its roster. Brown and Barry are in the Basketball Hall of Fame. After a 22–56 record in their first season, the Oaks went 60–18 during the regular season in 1968–69. The Oaks then defeated the Denver Rockets, New Orleans Buccaneers and finally the Indiana Pacers in the playoffs to capture the ABA Championship. However, the team was plagued by poor attendance and Boone sold the team following their ABA Championship. They were relocated to Washington and became the Washington Caps.

The Bay Bombers (roller derby, 1966–1973) as well as the Golden Bay Earthquakes of the original MISL during the 1982–83 season and the Oakland Skates, a professional roller hockey team active from 1993 to 1995, all played there. WWE also holds professional wrestling shows at the arena.

In 2020, the Oakland Panthers of the Indoor Football League, co-owned by NFL All-Pro and Oakland native Marshawn Lynch, were to begin play at Oakland Arena. Due to the onset of the COVID-19 pandemic, the Panthers postponed its start to 2022 and by August 2021, the Panthers announced they would instead play in San Jose as the Bay Area Panthers beginning with the 2022 season citing the uncertainty of the arena's future.

=== Renovation ===
Over three decades, the arena grew outdated, lacking the luxuries of newer ones. With just over 15,000 seats, it was one of the smallest venues in the league. Rather than building a new arena in Oakland, San Francisco or San Jose, the decision was made to proceed with a US$121 million renovation that involved tearing out much of the interior and building a new seating bowl within the existing structure. The original walls, roof and foundation remained intact, similar to the more recent rebuild of Climate Pledge Arena in Seattle. The renovation began in mid-1996 and was completed in time for the Warriors' return in the fall of 1997 (they played the 1996–97 season at the San Jose Arena, now the SAP Center at San Jose, home of the NHL's Sharks). Included in the renovation was a new center overhead LED scoreboard and 360-degree fascia display. The new configuration seats 19,596 for basketball.

=== Oracle naming rights deal ===
Oracle Arena logo (2006–2019)

On October 20, 2006, the Golden State Warriors and Oracle Corporation announced that Oakland Arena would be known as Oracle Arena for a 10-year term. A press conference was held on October 30. "The O", as it is referred to, continued to be managed by Oakland–Alameda County Coliseum Authority (JPA) and SMG. The JPA approved the deal at its November 10 meeting.

After the Warriors' resurgence since the 2012–13 season until the 2018–19 season, Oracle Arena was reckoned as one of the loudest arenas in the NBA. It was often called "Roaracle" because of the painfully high decibel levels sometimes generated at Warriors games. Shortly after the Warriors moved to San Francisco in 2019, the arena reverted to its old Oakland Arena name.

=== Attendance records ===
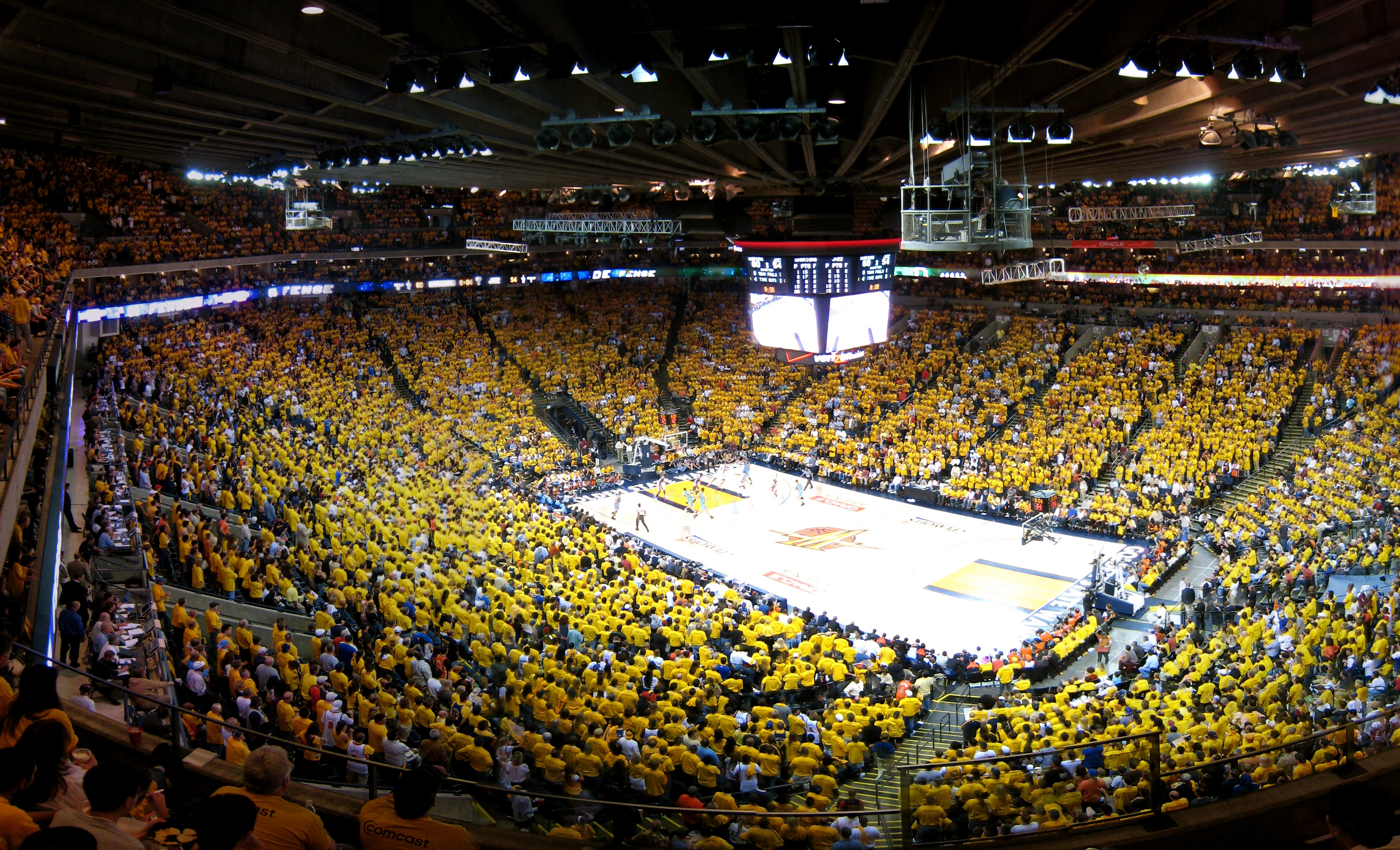
A record-breaking crowd watching the Warriors in the 2007 NBA playoffs.

On May 13, 2007, 20,679 fans watched the Warriors lose to the Utah Jazz 115–101 in Game 4 of the Western Conference semifinals. This was the highest attendance in the Warriors' 61-year history.

That record lasted until December 14, 2007, when the Warriors hosted the Los Angeles Lakers and packed 20,705 into the Arena to set a new franchise attendance record.

The record was again broken on February 20, 2008, when the arena hosted 20,711 for the Warriors-Celtics game.

This record was broken yet again on April 10, 2008, when Oracle Arena hosted 20,737 fans in a Warriors loss to the Denver Nuggets.

By the end of the 2016–17 regular season, Oracle had sold out 230 consecutive home games, a streak that continued throughout the team's playoff run. Oracle drew over 18,000 people per game for 12 straight seasons.

=== Concerts ===
Frank Sinatra performed at the Coliseum for a fundraising rally for Hubert Humphrey's presidential campaign on 22 May 1968.

The Rolling Stones performed two shows on November 9, 1969. Which produced the infamous bootleg Liver Than You’ll Ever Be

The Concert a live album by American rock band Creedence Clearwater Revival was recorded at the Oakland–Alameda County Coliseum Arena in Oakland, California, on January 31, 1970.

Elvis Presley kicked off his second tour of 1970 at the Coliseum on November 10, 1970. He would return again on November 11, 1972.

Marvin Gaye made his official return to live performing and touring at the Coliseum Arena on January 4, 1974, and this show was the basis for his 1 million-selling live album, Marvin Gaye Live! At the time, music industry executives cited the tour as a "heralded event" as Gaye made a comeback to live touring nearly 4 years after the death of his late singing partner Tammi Terrell.

Parliament-Funkadelic recorded half the album Live: P-Funk Earth Tour at the Oakland Coliseum Arena on January 21, 1977. The album was released in April of that year.

Queen performed concerts at the Oakland Coliseum Arena in 1978, 1980, and 1982, during their Jazz, Game, and "Hot Space Tours, respectively.

In 1984, Duran Duran performed here for their Sing Blue Silver Tour was filmed at the venue on 12, 13 and 15 of April. Footage from these shows were used in Arena (An Absurd Notion) and the TV special As The Lights Go Down and for their Arena album.

Frank Sinatra, Dean Martin and Sammy Davis Jr. opened their "Together Again Tour" at the Coliseum on 13 March 1988.

Nirvana performed concert at the Oakland Coliseum Arena in 1993, during their In Utero Tour.

Beyoncé performed at the venue numerous times from 2004 to 2009, notably throughout her tours as Verizon Ladies First Tour, Destiny Fulfilled... and Lovin' It, The Beyoncé Experience and I Am... Tour.

On November 8 and November 9, 2005, U2 performed at the arena as part of their Vertigo Tour, Damian Marley opened for them.

In 2010, James Taylor and Carole King performed at the arena as part of their Troubadour Reunion Tour.

Adele performed at the arena during her Adele Live 2016 tour on August 2, 2016.

KISS, an American rock band, played their final concert in the Bay Area with David Lee Roth of Van Halen on March 6, 2020.

K-pop group TWICE held their 4th World Tour 'III' on February 18, 2022.

Tyler, the Creator performed with Kali Uchis and Vince Staples for his “Call Me If You Get Lost” tour on April 1, 2022.

Paul McCartney performed there on May 6 and 8, 2022.

Pearl Jam performed on May 12 and 13, 2022 for their Gigaton tour.

Korean boy group Stray Kids performed on July 12, 2022, as part of their North American arena tour for Maniac World Tour.

Diljit Dosanjh performed on 29 July 2022, as part of his world tour

Sidhu Moose Wala was scheduled to perform on August 13, 2022, for his Back To Business World Tour, but died on May 29.

In 2023, Suga of BTS performed two shows on May 16-17 as a part of the D-Day Tour.

Hong Kong boy group MIRROR performed their first US arena concert on 5 April 2024 as part of the FEEL THE PASSION CONCERT TOUR 2024

Melanie Martinez performed here for her very first US arena concert tour, The Trilogy Tour on May 12, 2024.

K-pop singer-songwriter IU performed at the arena during her HEREH World Tour on July 30, 2024.

Twenty One Pilots brought their The Bandito Tour to the arena on November 11, 2018, and then returned for their The Clancy World Tour on August 24, 2024.

J-Hope of BTS performed two shows on March 31 and April 1, 2025 as a part of the Hope on the Stage Tour.

On November 14 and 15, 2025, Tame Impala performed at the arena for their Deadbeat Tour.

Taiwanese singer Cyndi Wang performed at the arena during her Sugar High World Tour On November 22, 2025.

On June 6, 9, and 10, 2026, Ariana Grande performed at the arena for her The Eternal Sunshine Tour.

==== The Grateful Dead ====
The Grateful Dead played more concerts at this venue than at any other, with 66 shows between 1979 and 1995, and their December 16, 1992, concert at the arena was released as Dick's Picks Volume 27, along with bonus tracks from their December 17, 1992, concert at the arena.

=== Warriors move back to San Francisco ===
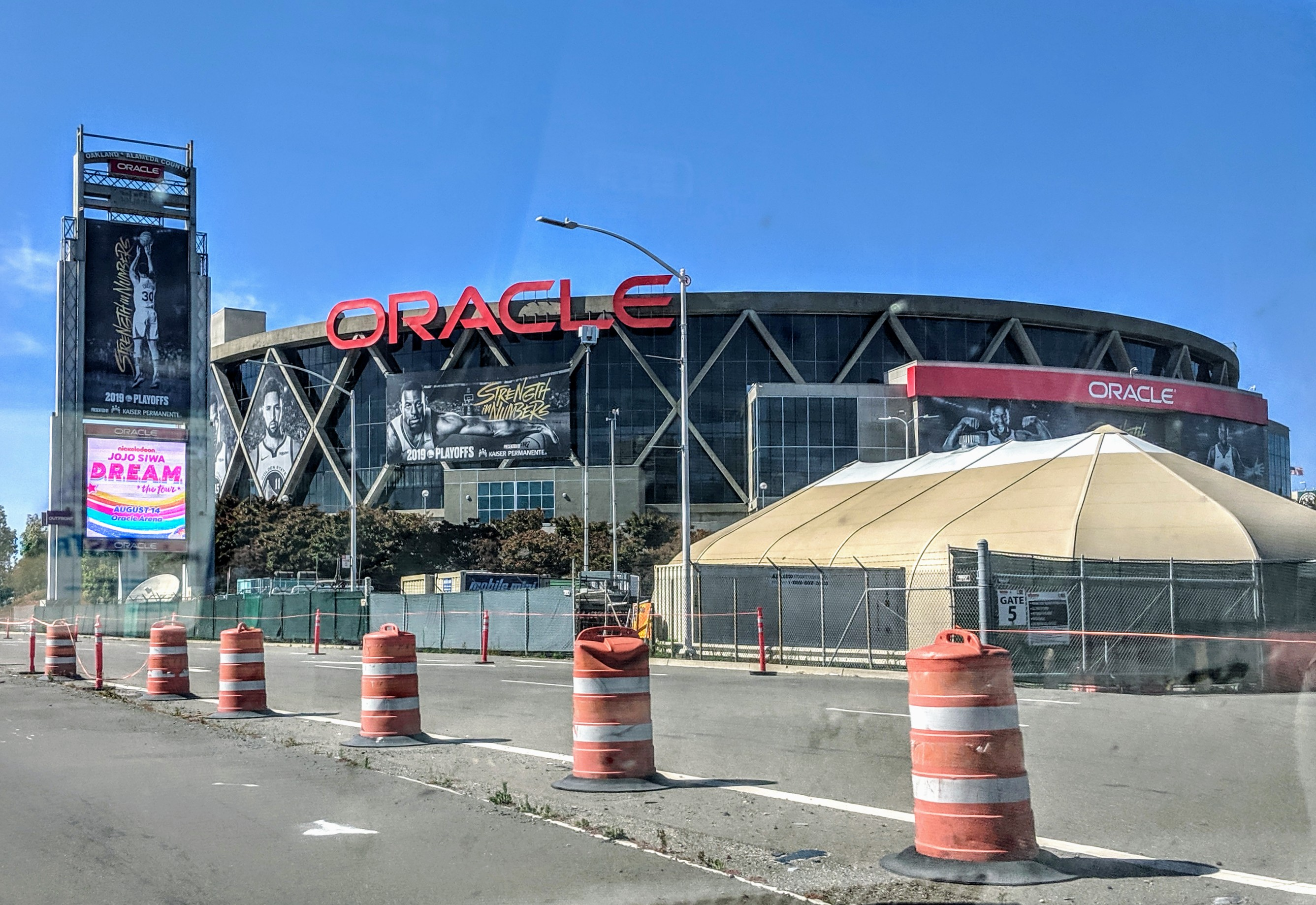
Oracle Arena in June 2019 during the NBA Finals, the last series of games for the Golden State Warriors at the arena

Early in 2013, the Warriors announced they would move back to San Francisco and build a new arena. It was originally suggested that the arena would be built on the decaying sites of Piers 30–32 near the foot of the Bay Bridge, but the plan was met with opposition due to concerns about traffic, environmental impacts and obstruction of views. In April 2014, the Warriors purchased 12 acres in Mission Bay as the site for a new 18,000-seat arena planned to open for the 2018–19 NBA season. The new location eliminated the need for voter approval, which would have been required for the original site, though it had been unanimously approved by the San Francisco Supervisors in November 2012. Because of delays due to litigation filed by arena opponents the opening season was pushed to the start of the 2019–20 NBA season.

The new arena was named Chase Center. On January 9, 2019, the San Francisco Giants announced that their home AT&T Park would be renamed Oracle Park, with the Oracle naming rights moving there from the arena. The Golden State Warriors played their final regular season game at Oracle Arena on April 7, 2019, with a 131–104 win over the Los Angeles Clippers. Notably, the team decided to wear their 2006–07 "We Believe" uniforms for that game, with the uniform choice not being revealed at any point beforehand until the Warriors players took off their warm-up uniforms shortly before tip-off, much to the delight of the home crowd. The Warriors played their final playoff game at Oracle Arena on June 13, 2019, a 114–110 loss to the Toronto Raptors in Game 6 of the NBA Finals. The loss ended the Warriors' quest for a third consecutive NBA championship. The court from that Finals game now sits at the Save-On-Foods Memorial Centre in Victoria, British Columbia.

Ever since the Warriors moved across the Bay to San Francisco, the arena remains open under the new name Oakland Arena. In February 2025, Oakland Arena was used for some events of the 2025 NBA All-Star Game hosted by the Warriors, including the Celebrity Game, All-Star Practice, and HBCU Classic.

== Seating capacity ==
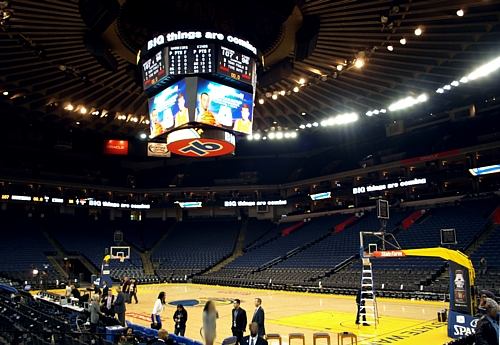
An interior view of Oakland Arena.

The seating capacity for basketball has expanded from 13,000 to 19,000 in over a half-century of use:

| Years | Capacity |
|---|---|
| 1966–1972 | 13,502 |
| 1972–1973 | 12,905 |
| 1973–1974 | 13,123 |
| 1974–1976 | 12,787 |
| 1976–1977 | 13,155 |
| 1977–1980 | 13,237 |
| 1980–1982 | 13,239 |
| 1982–1984 | 13,335 |
| 1984–1985 | 13,295 |
| 1985–1986 | 15,011 |
| 1986–1997 | 15,025 |
| 1997–2019 | 19,596 |

Events and tenants
| Preceded by War Memorial Gymnasium & San Francisco Civic Auditorium Cow Palace | Home of the Golden State Warriors; 1966–1967; 1971–1996; 1996–1997; 1997–2019 | Succeeded by Cow Palace San Jose Arena Chase Center |
| Preceded by Madison Square Garden | WTA Tour Championships venues 1978 | Succeeded by Madison Square Garden |
| Preceded by Olympiahalle, Munich | World Figure Skating Championships; Venue; 1992 | Succeeded by Sportovní hala, Prague |
| Preceded by first arena | Home of the California Golden Seals; 1967–1976 | Succeeded by Richfield Coliseum (as Cleveland Barons) |
| Preceded by Madison Square Garden | Host of the NBA All-Star Game; 2000 | Succeeded by MCI Center |
