= 1972 Golden Gate Pacific Coast Classic =

- Date: September 25 – October 1
- Edition: 84th
- Category: Grand Prix (Group C)
- Draw: 64S / 23D
- Prize money: $34,000
- Surface: Hard / outdoor
- Location: Albany, California, U.S.
- Venue: Golden Gate Fields

Champions

Singles
- (United States) Jimmy Connors

Doubles
- (South Africa) Frew McMillan / (South Africa) Bob Hewitt
← 1971 ·	Pacific Coast Championships	· 1973 →

The 1972 Golden Gate Pacific Coast Classic, also known as the Pacific Coast Championships, was a men's tennis tournament played on outdoor hard courts at the Golden Gate Fields in Albany, California in the United States. The event was part of Group C of the 1972 Commercial Union Assurance Grand Prix circuit. It was the 82nd edition of the tournament and ran from September 25 through October 1, 1972. Jimmy Connors won the singles title and earned $8,000 first-prize money.

== Finals ==
=== Singles ===
(United States) Jimmy Connors defeated (United States) Roscoe Tanner 6–2, 7–6^{(5–3)}

- It was Connors' 6th singles title of the year and of his career.

=== Doubles ===
(South Africa) Frew McMillan / (South Africa) Bob Hewitt defeated (Sweden) Björn Borg / (Sweden) Ove Nils Bengtson 6–2, 2–6, 6–2
