= 1972 Rothmans International Vancouver =

- Date: 15–22 October
- Edition: 3rd
- Category: World Championship Tennis (WCT)
- Draw: 30S / 15D
- Prize money: $50,000
- Surface: Carpet / indoor
- Location: Vancouver, BC, Canada
- Venue: PNE Agrodome

Champions

Singles
- (Australia) John Newcombe

Doubles
- (Australia) John Newcombe / (Australia) Fred Stolle
- Vancouver WCT

The 1972 Rothmans International Vancouver, also known as the Vancouver WCT, was a men's professional tennis tournament that was part of the 1972 World Championship Tennis circuit. It was held on indoor carpet courts at the PNE Agrodome in Vancouver, British Columbia in Canada. It was the third edition of the tournament and was held from 15 October through 22 October 1972. First-seeded John Newcombe won the singles title and earned $10,000 first-prize money.

== Finals ==
=== Singles ===
(Australia) John Newcombe defeated (United States) Marty Riessen 6–7^{(5–7)}, 7–6^{(7–5)}, 7–6^{(14–12)}, 7–5

- It was Newcombe's 5th singles title of the year and the 17th of his career in the Open Era.

=== Doubles ===
(Australia) John Newcombe / (Australia) Fred Stolle defeated (South Africa) Cliff Drysdale / (Australia) Allan Stone 7–6, 6–0
