= Calgary Rad'z =

Inline hockey team in Alberta, Canada

- City: Calgary, Alberta
- Founded: 1993
- Home arena: Olympic Saddledome (1993); Max Bell Centre (1993-1994)
- Colours: Black, Red, Yellow, Blue, White
- Murphy Cups: None
- Conference Championships: None
- Division Championships: None

Franchise history
- Calgary Rad'z (1993 - 1994)

The Calgary Rad'z were a professional inline hockey team that played two seasons in the Roller Hockey International in 1993 and 1994. The Rad'z were a founding member of the RHI. The Rad'z began play in the Olympic Saddledome, but moved to the much smaller Max Bell Arena midway through their first year. The team folded following the 1994 season.

== Season-by-season record ==
Note: GP = Games played, W = Wins, L = Losses, OTL = Overtime losses, Pts = Points, GF = Goals for, GA = Goals against

Season	GP	W	L	OTL	Points	GF	GA	Finish	Playoffs
1993	14	8	6	0	16	125	103	2nd King	Lost semi-final
1994	22	12	8	2	26	183	160	2nd Northwest	Lost quarter-final

== Notable players ==
Three former National Hockey League players played for the Rad'z in 1993:

- Doug Dadswell
- Morris Lukowich
- Bob Wilkie
