= 1974 Pacific Coast Open =

- Date: September 24–30
- Edition: 86th
- Category: Grand Prix (Grade AA)
- Draw: 64S / 32D
- Prize money: $100,000
- Surface: Hard / indoor
- Location: San Francisco, US
- Venue: Cow Palace

Champions

Singles
- (Australia) Ross Case

Doubles
- (United States) Bob Lutz / (United States) Stan Smith
- Pacific Coast Championships

The 1974 Pacific Coast Open, also known by its sponsored name Fireman's Fund International, was a men's tennis tournament that was part of the Grade AA category of the 1974 Grand Prix circuit. The event was played on indoor hard courts (Supreme Court) at the Cow Palace in San Francisco, United States. It was the first time the venue was used for the tournament which was the 86th edition and ran from September 24 through September 30, 1974. Unseeded Ross Case won the singles title and the accompanying $16,000 first prize money and 80 Grand Prix points.

== Finals ==
=== Singles ===
(Australia) Ross Case defeated (United States) Arthur Ashe 6–3, 5–7, 6–4

- It was Case's 1st singles title of the year and the 3rd of his career.

=== Doubles ===
(United States) Bob Lutz / (United States) Stan Smith defeated (Australia) John Alexander / (Australia) Syd Ball 6–4, 7–6^{(10–8)}
