= San Jose Rhinos =

Roller hockey team in San Jose, California

- City: San Jose, California
- Founded: 1994
- Home arena: San Jose Arena
- Colors: Purple, Gray, Safari Gold, White
- Murphy Cups: 1995
- Conference Championships: 1995
- Division Championships: None
- Owner: Rich Shillington
- General manager: Brad Porteus (1994 - 1995), Jon Gustafson (1996 - 1999)
- Head coach: Roy Sommer (1994 - 1996), Guy Gadowski (1997 - 1999)

Franchise history
- San Jose Rhinos (1994 - 1999)

The San Jose Rhinos were an inline hockey team in Roller Hockey International from 1994-97 and 1999 (the RHI did not operate in 1998). In its second year, the team won the Murphy Cup with a victory over the Montreal Roadrunners in the championship series. The team played its home games at the San Jose Arena.
