= Roy Emerson =

Australian tennis player (born 1936)

Roy Emerson AC
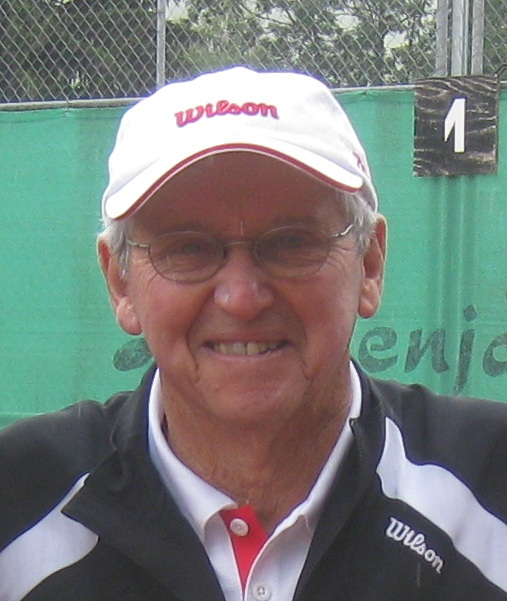
- Full name: Roy Stanley Emerson
- Country (sports): Australia
- Residence: Newport Beach, United States
- Born: 3 November 1936 (age 90) Blackbutt, Queensland, Australia
- Height: 183 cm (6 ft 0 in)
- Turned pro: 1968 (amateur tour from 1951)
- Retired: 1983
- Plays: Right-handed (one-handed backhand)
- Int. Tennis HoF: 1982 (member page)

Singles
- Career record: 1397-416 (77.0%)
- Career titles: 106 (6 listed by ATP)
- Highest ranking: No. 1 (1961, Ned Potter)

Grand Slam singles results
- Australian Open: W (1961, 1963, 1964, 1965, 1966, 1967)
- French Open: W (1963, 1967)
- Wimbledon: W (1964, 1965)
- US Open: W (1961, 1964)

Doubles
- Career record: 204–64

Grand Slam doubles results
- Australian Open: W (1962, 1966, 1969)
- French Open: W (1960, 1961, 1962, 1963, 1964, 1965)
- Wimbledon: W (1959, 1961, 1971)
- US Open: W (1959, 1960, 1965, 1966)

Team competitions
- Davis Cup: W (1959, 1960, 1961, 1962, 1964, 1965, 1966, 1967)

Roy Stanley Emerson AC (born 3 November 1936) is an Australian former tennis player. He won 12 Grand Slam tournament singles titles and 16 Grand Slam doubles titles, for a total of 28 Grand Slam tournament titles. All of his singles Grand Slam victories and 14 of his Grand Slam doubles victories were achieved before the Open era began in 1968. He is the only male player to have completed the career Grand Slam (winning titles at all four Grand Slam events) in both singles and doubles, and the first of four male players to complete the double career Grand Slam in singles (later followed by Rod Laver, Novak Djokovic, and Rafael Nadal). His 28 major titles are the all-time record for a male player. He was ranked world No. 1 amateur in 1961 by Ned Potter, 1964 by Potter, Lance Tingay and an Ulrich Kaiser panel of 14 experts and 1965 by Tingay, Joseph McCauley, Sport za Rubezhom and an Ulrich Kaiser panel of 16 experts.

Emerson was the first male player to win 12 singles majors. He held that record for 30 years until it was passed by Pete Sampras in 2000. He also held the record of six Australian Open men's singles titles until 2019 when Novak Djokovic won his seventh title. Emerson won five of those titles consecutively (1963–67), a still-standing record. Emerson is one of only five tennis players ever to win multiple slam sets in two disciplines. Emerson was a member of a record eight Davis Cup–winning teams between 1959 and 1967. Unlike several of his contemporaries, he chose to remain an amateur player and did not turn professional before the advent of the Open Era.

== Biography ==
Emerson was born on a farm in Blackbutt, Queensland. His family later moved to Brisbane and he received better tennis instruction after attending Brisbane Grammar School and Ipswich Grammar School. He played his first singles tour event at the 1951 Southwest Queensland Championships. He won his first singles title at the 1953 Queensland Hard Court Championships.

Emerson won his first Grand Slam tournament doubles title in 1959 at Wimbledon (partnering Neale Fraser). In 1961, he captured his first Grand Slam tournament singles title at the Australian Championships, beating compatriot Rod Laver in four sets in the final. Later that year, Emerson claimed his second major singles crown when he again beat Laver in the final of the US Championships.

Known as "Emmo" on the tour, the six-foot right-hander was known for training hard and always being ready for strenuous matches because of his level of fitness. He was primarily a serve-and-volley style player, but was also able to adapt to the rigours of slow courts, allowing him to play on all surfaces.

From 1963 to 1967, Emerson won five consecutive men's singles titles at the Australian Championships. His record of six Australian men's singles crowns was surpassed in 2019 by Novak Djokovic who won his record seventh.

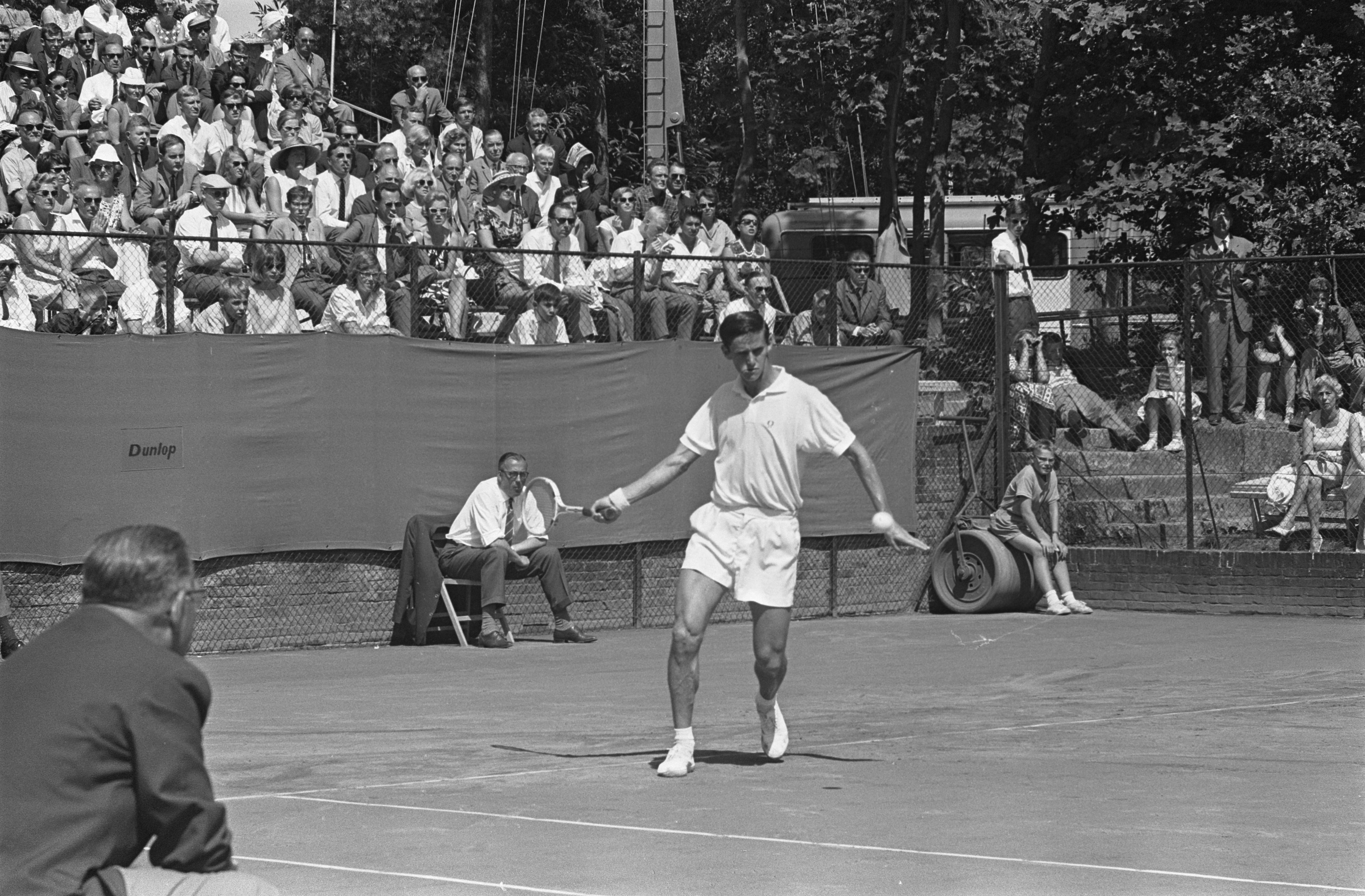
Roy Emerson at the 1963 Dutch International Tennis Championships in Hilversum.

1963 also saw Emerson capture his first French Championships singles title, beating Pierre Darmon in the final.

Emerson's first Wimbledon singles title came in 1964, with a final victory over Fred Stolle. Emerson won 55 consecutive matches during 1964 and finished the year with 109 victories out of 115 matches. He won three of the year's four Grand Slam events that year (failing to win only the French Open).

During his amateur career, Emerson received several offers to turn professional, including an £38,000 offer made at the end of 1964 by Jack Kramer, but declined and opted to remain an amateur. In 1966, Emerson rejected a $100,000 guarantee over two years offer to turn pro, stating that he "couldn't afford to take a pay cut." It was estimated that Emerson and Santana were paid about $1,000 to $1,500 a week in living expenses alone from their national tennis associations as "shamateurs".

Emerson was the world No. 1 amateur player in 1964 and 1965 according to Lance Tingay of The Daily Telegraph and in 1961 and 1964 according to Ned Potter of World Tennis. In 1965, he successfully defended his Australian and Wimbledon singles crowns. He was the heavy favourite to win Wimbledon again in 1966, but during his fourth round match he skidded while chasing the ball and crashed into the umpire's stand, injuring his shoulder. He still finished the match, but was unable to win.

Emerson's last major singles title came at the French Championships in 1967 – the year before the open era began. His 12 major singles titles stood as a men's record until 2000, when it was surpassed by Pete Sampras. Emerson signed a professional contract with the National Tennis League in early April 1968.

Emerson had 10 straight victories in Grand Slam tournament finals in which he appeared, which is an all-time record.

Emerson's final Grand Slam doubles title was won in 1971 at Wimbledon (partnering Laver). His 16 Grand Slam doubles crowns were won with five different partners. From 1960 to 1965, he won six consecutive French Open men's doubles titles. Jack Kramer, the long-time tennis promoter and tennis great, writes in his 1979 autobiography that "Emerson was the best doubles player of all the moderns, very possibly the best forehand court player of all time. He was so quick he could cover everything. He had the perfect doubles shot, a backhand that dipped over the net and came in at the server's feet as he moved to the net. Gene Mako and Johnny van Ryn could hit a shot like that sometimes, but never so often nor as proficiently as Emerson."

Emerson was also a member of a record eight Davis Cup winning teams between 1959 and 1967.

Emerson's 12 singles and 16 doubles titles make him one of the leading players in Grand Slam tournament history.

Emerson's last top-20 ranking was in 1973, primarily owing to his winning his 119th and final career title at the Pacific Coast Championships in San Francisco. He defeated Roscoe Tanner, Arthur Ashe, and Björn Borg in the last three rounds of that tournament. Emerson played just a few tournaments through 1977. His last appearance was at the Swiss Open in Gstaad, Switzerland in 1983.

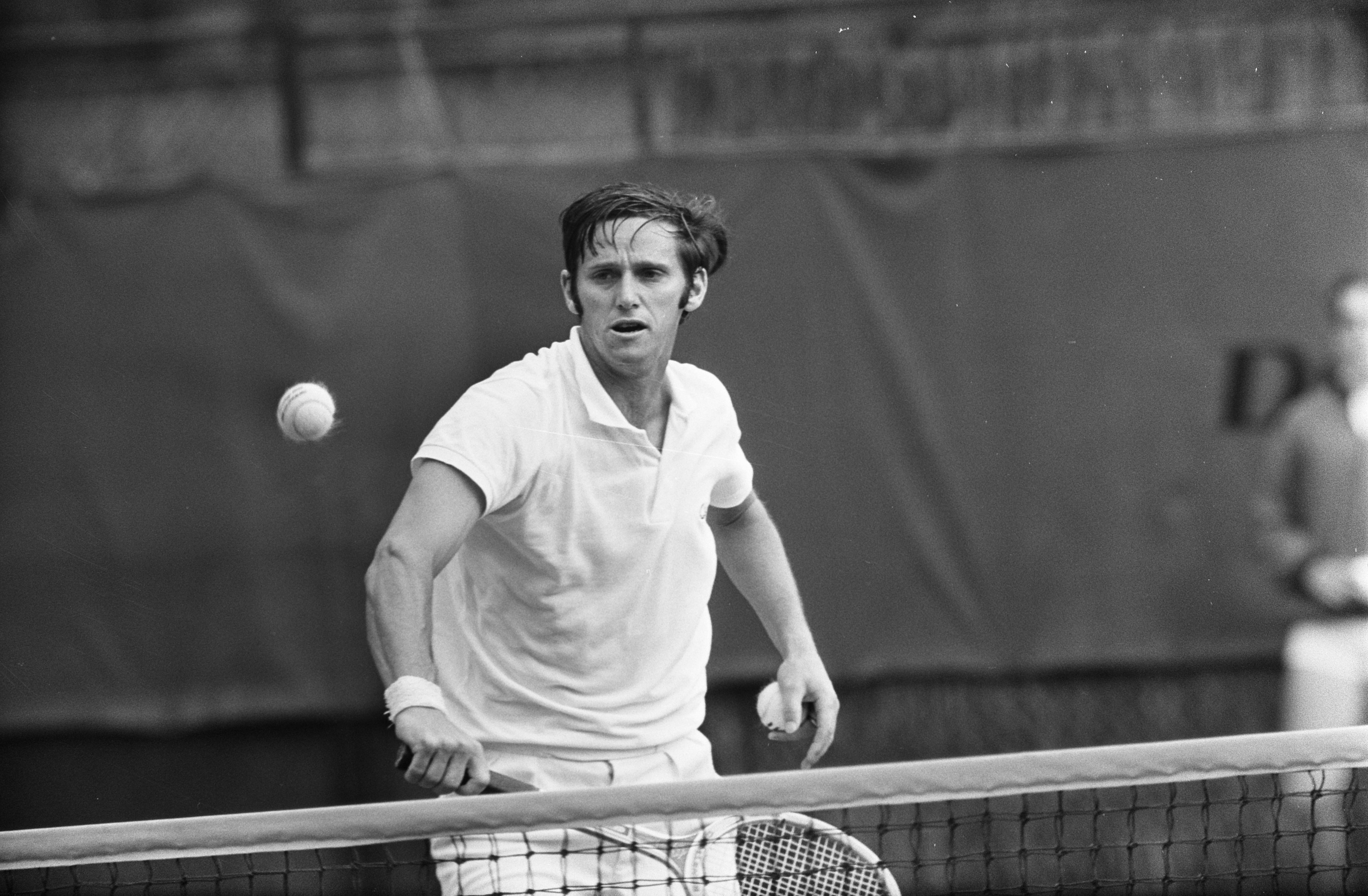
Roy Emerson in 1969

Although he exited the tournament circuit, Emerson did not retire. In the late 1970s, he served as a player/coach for the Boston Lobsters in World Team Tennis (WTT). He mostly played doubles with the Lobsters and often teamed with fellow Australian Tony Roche. In the 1978 season, the last season under the original iteration of World Team Tennis, Roy coached the Lobsters to the Eastern Division Championship and into the WTT Finals against the Los Angeles Strings. The final Lobster team that Emerson coached consisted of Tony Roche, Mike Estep (for part of the season), and Emerson himself as the male players.

Emerson now resides in Newport Beach, California with his wife, Joy, and daughter, Heidi, and has a home in Gstaad where he holds a tennis clinic each summer. His son, Antony, was an All-American in tennis at Corona del Mar High School and the University of Southern California and played on the professional tour briefly. Roy and Antony won the United States Hard Court Father-and-Son title in 1978. Roy briefly coached promising juniors at East Lake Woodlands in Oldsmar, Florida.

== Awards and honours ==
Emerson was inducted into the International Tennis Hall of Fame in 1982 and the Sport Australia Hall of Fame in 1986. The main court for the Suisse Open Gstaad, a tournament which Emerson won five times and where he played his last match as a professional, is named Roy Emerson Arena in his honour.

In 2000, Emerson was awarded the Australian Sports Medal, and in 2001 received the Centenary Medal.

The Roy Emerson trophy, which is awarded to the male champion at the Brisbane International, is named in his honour. In 2009 Emerson was inducted into the Queensland Sport Hall of Fame. He was honoured during the 2013 Australian Open at the Australian Open Legends' Lunch.

In 2014, the Brisbane City Council named the new tennis centre in Milton at Frew Park after Roy Emerson. The same year at Blackbutt, the Roy Emerson Museum was opened by Roy Emerson. On the 18 January 2017, a statue of Roy Emerson was unveiled at the Blackbutt Museum.

== Place in history ==
In the Tennis Channel series "100 Greatest of All Time" in 2012, Emerson was ranked the 11th greatest male tennis player of all time, and the second highest rated Australian in the series, behind Rod Laver.

== Grand Slam finals ==
=== Singles: 15 (12 titles, 3 runners–up) ===
Result	Year	Championship	Surface	Opponent	Score
Win	1961	Australian Championships	Grass	(Australia) Rod Laver	1–6, 6–3, 7–5, 6–4
Win	1961	US Championships	Grass	(Australia) Rod Laver	7–5, 6–3, 6–2
Loss	1962	Australian Championships	Grass	(Australia) Rod Laver	6–8, 6–0, 4–6, 4–6
Loss	1962	French Championships	Clay	(Australia) Rod Laver	6–3, 6–2, 3–6, 7–9, 2–6
Loss	1962	US Championships	Grass	(Australia) Rod Laver	2–6, 4–6, 7–5, 4–6
Win	1963	Australian Championships	Grass	(Australia) Ken Fletcher	6–3, 6–3, 6–1
Win	1963	French Championships	Clay	(France) Pierre Darmon	3–6, 6–1, 6–4, 6–4
Win	1964	Australian Championships	Grass	(Australia) Fred Stolle	6–3, 6–4, 6–2
Win	1964	Wimbledon Championships	Grass	(Australia) Fred Stolle	6–4, 12–10, 4–6, 6–3
Win	1964	US Championships	Grass	(Australia) Fred Stolle	6–2, 6–2, 6–4
Win	1965	Australian Championships	Grass	(Australia) Fred Stolle	7–9, 2–6, 6–4, 7–5, 6–1
Win	1965	Wimbledon Championships	Grass	(Australia) Fred Stolle	6–2, 6–4, 6–4
Win	1966	Australian Championships	Grass	(United States) Arthur Ashe	6–4, 6–8, 6–2, 6–3
Win	1967	Australian Championships	Grass	(United States) Arthur Ashe	6–4, 6–1, 6–1
Win	1967	French Championships	Clay	(Australia) Tony Roche	6–1, 6–4, 2–6, 6–2

=== Doubles: 28 (16 titles, 12 runners–up) ===
Result	Year	Championship	Surface	Partner	Opponents	Score
Loss	1958	Australian Championships	Grass	(Australia) Bob Mark	(Australia) Ashley Cooper (Australia) Neale Fraser	5–7, 8–6, 6–3, 3–6, 5–7
Loss	1959	French Championships	Clay	(Australia) Neale Fraser	(Italy) Nicola Pietrangeli (Italy) Orlando Sirola	3–6, 2–6, 12–14
Win	1959	Wimbledon	Grass	(Australia) Neale Fraser	(Australia) Rod Laver (Australia) Robert Mark	8–6, 6–3, 14–16, 9–7
Win	1959	US Championships	Grass	(Australia) Neale Fraser	(United States) Earl Buchholz (United States) Alex Olmedo	3–6, 6–3, 5–7, 6–4, 7–5
Loss	1960	Australian Championships	Grass	(Australia) Neale Fraser	(Australia) Rod Laver (Australia) Robert Mark	6–1, 2–6, 4–6, 4–6
Win	1960	French Championships	Clay	(Australia) Neale Fraser	(Spain) José Luis Arilla (Spain) Andrés Gimeno	6–2, 8–10, 7–5, 6–4
Win	1960	US Championships	Grass	(Australia) Neale Fraser	(Australia) Rod Laver (Australia) Robert Mark	9–7, 6–2, 6–4
Loss	1961	Australian Championships	Grass	(Australia) Marty Mulligan	(Australia) Rod Laver (Australia) Robert Mark	3–6, 5–7, 6–3, 11–9, 2–6
Win	1961	French Championships	Clay	(Australia) Rod Laver	(Australia) Robert Howe (Australia) Robert Mark	3–6, 6–1, 6–1, 6–4
Win	1961	Wimbledon	Grass	(Australia) Neale Fraser	(Australia) Bob Hewitt (Australia) Fred Stolle	6–4, 6–8, 6–4, 6–8, 8–6
Win	1962	Australian Championships	Grass	(Australia) Neale Fraser	(Australia) Bob Hewitt (Australia) Fred Stolle	4–6, 4–6, 6–1, 6–4, 11–9
Win	1962	French Championships	Clay	(Australia) Neale Fraser	(West Germany) Wilhelm Bungert (West Germany) Christian Kuhnke	6–3, 6–4, 7–5
Win	1963	French Championships	Clay	(Spain) Manolo Santana	(South Africa) Gordon Forbes (South Africa) Abe Segal	6–2, 6–4, 6–4
Loss	1964	Australian Championships	Grass	(Australia) Ken Fletcher	(Australia) Bob Hewitt (Australia) Fred Stolle	4–6, 5–7, 6–3, 6–4, 12–14
Win	1964	French Championships	Clay	(Australia) Ken Fletcher	(Australia) John Newcombe (Australia) Tony Roche	7–5, 6–3, 3–6, 7–5
Loss	1964	Wimbledon Championships	Grass	(Australia) Ken Fletcher	(Australia) Bob Hewitt (Australia) Fred Stolle	5–7, 9–11, 4–6
Loss	1965	Australian Championships	Grass	(Australia) Fred Stolle	(Australia) John Newcombe (Australia) Tony Roche	6–3, 6–4, 11–13, 3–6, 4–6
Win	1965	French Championships	Clay	(Australia) Fred Stolle	(Australia) Ken Fletcher (Australia) Bob Hewitt	6–8, 6–3, 8–6, 6–2
Win	1965	US Championships	Grass	(Australia) Fred Stolle	(United States) Frank Froehling (United States) Charles Pasarell	6–4, 10–12, 7–5, 6–3
Win	1966	Australian Championships	Grass	(Australia) Fred Stolle	(Australia) John Newcombe (Australia) Tony Roche	7–9, 6–3, 6–8, 14–12, 12–10
Win	1966	US Championships	Grass	(Australia) Fred Stolle	(United States) Clark Graebner (United States) Dennis Ralston	6–4, 6–4, 6–4
Loss	1967	French Championships	Clay	(Australia) Ken Fletcher	(Australia) John Newcombe (Australia) Tony Roche	3–6, 7–9, 10–12
Loss	1967	Wimbledon	Grass	(Australia) Ken Fletcher	(Australia) Bob Hewitt (Australia) Frew McMillan	2–6, 3–6, 4–6
↓ Open Era ↓
Loss	1968	French Open	Clay	(Australia) Rod Laver	(Australia) Ken Rosewall (Australia) Fred Stolle	3–6, 4–6, 3–6
Win	1969	Australian Open	Grass	(Australia) Rod Laver	(Australia) Ken Rosewall (Australia) Fred Stolle	6–4, 6–4
Loss	1969	French Open	Clay	(Australia) Rod Laver	(Australia) John Newcombe (Australia) Tony Roche	6–4, 1–6, 6–3, 4–6, 4–6
Loss	1970	US Open	Grass	(Australia) Rod Laver	(France) Pierre Barthès (Socialist Federal Republic of Yugoslavia) Nikola Pilić	3–6, 6–7, 6–4, 6–7
Win	1971	Wimbledon	Grass	(Australia) Rod Laver	(United States) Arthur Ashe (United States) Dennis Ralston	4–6, 9–7, 6–8, 6–4, 6–4

=== Mixed doubles: 2 (runners–up) ===
Result	Year	Championship	Surface	Partner	Opponents	Score
Loss	1956	Australian Championships	Grass	(Australia) Mary Bevis Hawton	(Australia) Beryl Penrose (Australia) Neale Fraser	2–6, 4–6
Loss	1960	French Championships	Clay	(United Kingdom) Ann Haydon-Jones	(Brazil) Maria Bueno (Australia) Robert Howe	6–1, 1–6, 2–6

== Grand Slam tournament performance timeline ==
Key
W	F	SF	QF	#R	RR	Q#	DNQ	A	NH

(W) winner; (F) finalist; (SF) semifinalist; (QF) quarterfinalist; (#R) rounds 4, 3, 2, 1; (RR) round-robin stage; (Q#) qualification round; (DNQ) did not qualify; (A) absent; (NH) not held; (SR) strike rate (events won / competed); (W–L) win–loss record.

=== Singles ===
Tournament	1954	1955	1956	1957	1958	1959	1960	1961	1962	1963	1964	1965	1966	1967	1968	1969	1970	1971	1972	SR	W–L	Win %
Australian Open	1R	2R	2R	A	QF	QF	SF	W	F	W	W	W	W	W	A	3R	A	QF	A	6 / 15	46–9	83.6
French Open	1R	A	A	3R	A	QF	3R	QF	F	W	QF	SF	QF	W	QF	4R	A	A	A	2 / 13	43–11	79.6
Wimbledon	2R	A	3R	4R	A	SF	QF	QF	4R	QF	W	W	QF	4R	4R	4R	QF	4R	A	2 / 16	60–14	81.1
US Open	3R	A	QF	4R	A	QF	3R	W	F	4R	W	QF	SF	QF	4R	QF	4R	A	1R	2 / 16	61–14	81.3
Win–loss	3–4	0–1	7–3	8–3	2–1	14–4	10–4	19–2	18–4	18–2	22–1	20–2	18–3	18–2	9–3	11–4	7–2	5–2	1–1	12 / 60	210–48	81.4

== Open Era career finals ==
Legend
Grand Slam tournament

=== Singles: 21 (6 titles / 15 runner-ups) ===
Result	W-L	Date	Tournament	Surface	Partner	Score
Win	1–0	Apr 1968	Hollywood NTL, US	Clay	(Australia) Ken Rosewall	6–1, 6–1
Loss	1–1	Jun 1968	Beckenham, UK	Grass	(Australia) Fred Stolle	3–6, 1–6
Loss	1–2	Sep 1968	Midland, US	Hard	(United States) Pancho Gonzales	5–7, 4–6
Win	2–2	Nov 1968	Buenos Aires, Argentina	Clay	(Australia) Rod Laver	9–7, 6–4, 6–4
Loss	1–3	May 1969	Tokyo, Japan	Hard (i)	(Netherlands) Tom Okker	3–6, 5–6
Loss	5–4	May 1969	New York, US	Carpet	(Australia) Rod Laver	2–6, 6–4, 1–6
Win	3–4	Jul 1969	Aix-en-Provence, France	Clay	(West Germany) Harald Elschenbroich	6–3, 6–4, 8–6
Win	4–4	Jul 1969	Gstaad, Switzerland	Clay	(Netherlands) Tom Okker	6–1, 12–14, 6–4, 6–4
Win	5–4	Aug 1969	Poertschach, Austria	Clay	(South Africa) Cliff Drysdale	6–3, 3–6, 6–3
Loss	5–5	Oct 1969	Cologne, Germany	Carpet	(Spain) Andrés Gimeno	3–6, 17–19
Loss	5–6	Apr 1970	Dallas, US	Carpet	(Spain) Andrés Gimeno	2–6, 3–6, 2–6
Loss	5–7	Aug 1970	Fort Worth, US	Hard	(Australia) Rod Laver	3–6, 5–7
Loss	5–8	Oct 1970	Vancouver, Canada	Carpet	(Australia) Rod Laver	2–6, 1–6, 2–6
Loss	5–9	Oct 1970	Tucson, US	Hard	(United States) Marty Riessen	1–6, 4–6
Loss	5–10	Apr 1972	Macon Open, US	Carpet	(United Kingdom) Mark Cox	3–6, 7–6^{(11–9)}, 3–6
Loss	5–11	Sep 1972	Montreal, Canada	Hard	(United States) Arthur Ashe	5–7, 6–4, 2–6, 3–6
Loss	5–12	Nov 1972	Gothenburg WCT, Sweden	Carpet	(Australia) John Newcombe	0–6, 3–6, 1–6
Loss	5–13	Feb 1973	Richmond WCT, US	Carpet	(Australia) Rod Laver	4–6, 3–6
Loss	5–14	Feb 1973	Toronto WCT, Canada	Carpet	(Australia) Rod Laver	3–6, 4–6
Loss	5–15	Jul 1973	Gstaad, Switzerland	Clay	(Romania) Ilie Năstase	4–6, 3–6, 3–6
Win	6–15	Sep 1973	San Francisco, US	Hard	(Sweden) Björn Borg	5–7, 6–1, 6–4

=== Doubles: 37 (20 titles / 17 runner-ups) ===
Result	W-L	Date	Tournament	Surface	Partner	Opponents	Score
Win	1–0	Apr 1968	Bournemouth, UK	Grass	(Australia) Rod Laver	(Spain) Andrés Gimeno (United States) Pancho Gonzales	8–6, 4–6, 6–3, 6–2
Loss	1–1	Jun 1968	French Open, Paris	Clay	(Australia) Rod Laver	(Australia) Ken Rosewall (Australia) Fred Stolle	3–6, 4–6, 3–6
Win	2–1	Jan 1969	Australian Open, Melbourne	Grass	(Australia) Rod Laver	(Australia) Ken Rosewall (Australia) Fred Stolle	6–4, 6–4
Loss	2–2	Jun 1969	French Open, Paris	Clay	(Australia) Rod Laver	(Australia) John Newcombe (Australia) Tony Roche	6–4, 1–6, 6–3, 4–6, 4–6
Loss	2–3	Jul 1969	Gstaad, Switzerland	Clay	(Australia) Mal Anderson	(Netherlands) Tom Okker (United States) Marty Riessen	1–6, 4–6
Loss	2–4	Nov 1969	Buenos Aires, Argentina	Clay	(South Africa) Frew McMillan	(Chile) Patricio Cornejo (Chile) Jaime Fillol	w.o.
Win	3–4	Nov 1969	Stockholm, Sweden	Hard (i)	(Australia) Rod Laver	(Spain) Andrés Gimeno (Australia) Fred Stolle	6–4, 6–2
Loss	3–5	Jun 1970	St. Louis WCT, US	Carpet	(Australia) Rod Laver	(Spain) Andrés Gimeno (Australia) John Newcombe	4–6, 2–6
Win	4–5	Aug 1970	Boston, US	Hard	(Australia) Rod Laver	(United Arab Republic) Ismail El Shafei (Denmark) Torben Ulrich	6–1, 7–6
Loss	4–6	Aug 1970	Louisville, US	Hard	(Australia) Rod Laver	(Australia) John Newcombe (Australia) Tony Roche	6–8, 7–5, 4–6
Loss	4–7	Sep 1970	US Open, New York City	Grass	(Australia) Rod Laver	(France) Pierre Barthès (Socialist Federal Republic of Yugoslavia) Nikola Pilić	7–5, 4–6, 2–6, 6–7
Loss	4–8	Apr 1971	Miami WCT, US	Hard	(Australia) Rod Laver	(Australia) John Newcombe (Australia) Tony Roche	6–7, 6–7
Win	5–8	Jul 1971	Wimbledon, London	Grass	(Australia) Rod Laver	(United States) Arthur Ashe (United States) Dennis Ralston	4–6, 9–7, 6–8, 6–4, 6–4
Win	6–8	Aug 1971	Quebec WCT, Canada	Hard (i)	(Australia) Rod Laver	(Netherlands) Tom Okker (United States) Marty Riessen	7–6, 6–3
Win	7–8	Aug 1971	Boston WCT, US	Hard	(Australia) Rod Laver	(Netherlands) Tom Okker (United States) Marty Riessen	6–4, 6–4
Win	8–8	Oct 1971	Berkeley, US	Hard	(Australia) Rod Laver	(Australia) Ken Rosewall (Australia) Fred Stolle	6–3, 6–3
Win	9–8	Oct 1971	Vancouver WCT, Canada	Carpet	(Australia) Rod Laver	(Australia) John Alexander (Australia) Phil Dent	5–7, 6–7, 6–0, 7–5, 7–6
Loss	9–9	Oct 1971	Cologne WCT, West Germany	Carpet	(Australia) Rod Laver	(Netherlands) Tom Okker (United States) Marty Riessen	7–6, 6–3, 6–7, 3–6, 4–6
Loss	9–10	Feb 1972	Toronto WCT, Canada	Carpet	(Australia) Rod Laver	(Australia) Bob Carmichael (Australia) Ray Ruffels	4–6, 6–4, 4–6
Loss	9–11	Mar 1972	Miami WCT, US	Hard	(Australia) Rod Laver	(Netherlands) Tom Okker (United States) Marty Riessen	5–7, 4–6
Loss	9–12	Mar 1972	Chicago WCT, US	Carpet	(Australia) Rod Laver	(Netherlands) Tom Okker (United States) Marty Riessen	2–6, 3–6
Win	10–12	Apr 1972	Houston WCT, US	Clay	(Australia) Rod Laver	(Australia) Ken Rosewall (Australia) Fred Stolle	6–3, 6–3
Win	11–12	May 1972	Las Vegas WCT, US	Hard	(Australia) Rod Laver	(Australia) John Newcombe (Australia) Tony Roche	w.o.
Loss	11–13	Nov 1972	Stockholm	Hard (i)	(Australia) Colin Dibley	(Netherlands) Tom Okker (United States) Marty Riessen	5–7, 6–7
Win	12–13	Nov 1972	Rotterdam WCT, Netherlands	Carpet	(Australia) John Newcombe	(United States) Arthur Ashe (United States) Bob Lutz	6–2, 6–3
Win	13–13	Jan 1973	Miami WCT, US	Hard	(Australia) Rod Laver	(Australia) Terry Addison (Australia) Colin Dibley	6–4, 6–4
Win	14–13	Jan 1973	La Costa WCT, US	Hard	(Australia) Rod Laver	(Socialist Federal Republic of Yugoslavia) Nikola Pilić (Australia) Allan Stone	6–7, 6–3, 6–4
Win	15–13	Feb 1973	Richmond WCT, US	Carpet	(Australia) Rod Laver	(Australia) Terry Addison (Australia) Colin Dibley	3–6, 6–3, 6–4
Loss	15–14	Feb 1973	Philadelphia WCT, US	Carpet	(Australia) Rod Laver	(United States) Brian Gottfried (United States) Dick Stockton	6–4, 3–6, 4–6
Loss	15–15	Feb 1973	Toronto WCT, Canada	Carpet	(Australia) Rod Laver	(Australia) John Alexander (Australia) Phil Dent	6–3, 4–6, 4–6, 2–6
Win	16–15	Mar 1973	Atlanta WCT, US	Clay	(Australia) Rod Laver	(South Africa) Robert Maud (Rhodesia) Andrew Pattison	7–6, 6–3
Win	17–15	Apr 1973	Gothenburg WCT, Sweden	Carpet	(Australia) Rod Laver	(Socialist Federal Republic of Yugoslavia) Nikola Pilić (Australia) Allan Stone	6–7, 6–4, 6–1
Win	18–15	Sep 1973	San Francisco, US	Carpet	(United States) Stan Smith	(Sweden) Ove Nils Bengtson (United States) Jim McManus	6–2, 6–1
Loss	18–16	Mar 1974	La Costa WCT, US	Hard	(Australia) Dennis Ralston	(United States) Clark Graebner (United States) Charlie Pasarell	4–6, 7–6, 5–7
Win	19–16	May 1974	Las Vegas, US	Hard	(Australia) Rod Laver	(South Africa) Frew McMillan (Australia) John Newcombe	6–7, 6–4, 6–4
Loss	19–17	Jul 1974	Gstaad, Switzerland	Clay	(Brazil) Thomaz Koch	(Spain) José Higueras (Spain) Manuel Orantes	5–7, 6–0, 1–6, 8–9
Win	20–17	Apr 1975	Denver WCT, US	Carpet	(Australia) Rod Laver	(Australia) Bob Carmichael (Australia) Allan Stone	6–2, 3–6, 7–5

== See also ==
- World number one male tennis player rankings
- Tennis male players statistics
- All-time tennis records – men's singles
- Tennis records of the Open Era – men's singles

Records
Preceded by (United States) Bill Tilden	Most career Grand Slam singles titles 30 January 1967 – 9 July 2000	Succeeded by (United States) Pete Sampras
