= Vancouver WCT =

Defunct tennis tournament
- Event name: Rothmans Vancouver International
- Tour: WCT circuit
- Founded: 1970
- Abolished: 1973
- Editions: 4
- Location: Vancouver, Canada
- Venue: PNE Agrodome
- Surface: Carpet / indoor

The Vancouver WCT, also known by its sponsored name Rothmans Vancouver International, was a men's tennis tournament held at the PNE Agrodome in Vancouver, British Columbia, Canada from 1970 to 1973. The event was part of the WCT Tour and was played in indoor carpet courts. The tournament was cancelled in July 1973 due to diminishing interest and decreasing attendance.

== Finals ==
=== Singles ===
| Year | Champions | Runners-up | Score |
|---|---|---|---|
| 1970 | (Australia) Rod Laver | (Australia) Roy Emerson | 6–2, 6–1, 6–2 |
| 1971 | (Australia) Ken Rosewall | (Netherlands) Tom Okker | 6–2, 6–2, 6–4 |
| 1972 | (Australia) John Newcombe | (United States) Marty Riessen | 6–7^{(5–7)}, 7–6^{(7–5)}, 7–6^{(14–12)}, 7–5 |
| 1973 | (United States) Tom Gorman | (Czech Republic) Jan Kodeš | 3–6, 6–2, 7–5 |

=== Doubles ===
| Year | Champions | Runners-up | Score |
|---|---|---|---|
| 1970 | (Australia) Roy Emerson (Australia) Rod Laver | (France) Pierre Barthès (Socialist Federal Republic of Yugoslavia) Nikola Pilić | 6–1, 6–4, 6–3 |
| 1971 | (Australia) Roy Emerson (Australia) Rod Laver | (Australia) John Alexander (Australia) Phil Dent | 5–7, 6–7, 6–0, 7–5, 7–6 |
| 1972 | (Australia) John Newcombe (Australia) Fred Stolle | (South Africa) Cliff Drysdale (Australia) Allan Stone | 7–6, 6–0 |
| 1973 | (France) Pierre Barthès (United Kingdom) Roger Taylor | (United States) Tom Gorman (United States) Erik van Dillen | 5–7, 6–3, 7–6 |
