= PNE Agrodome =

Sports arena in British Columbia

Coordinates: 49.284450°N 123.041182°W

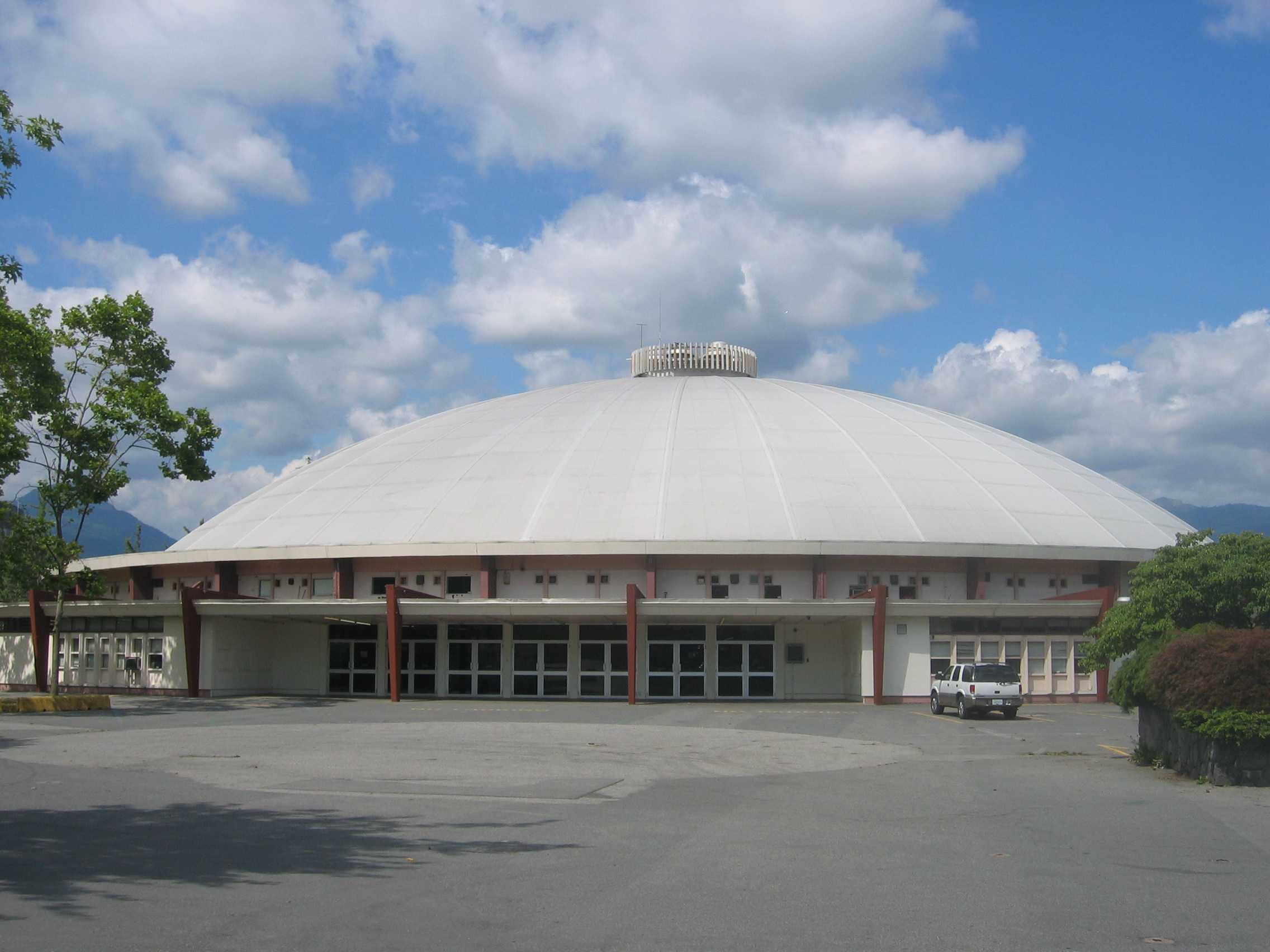
The PNE Agrodome

The PNE (Pacific National Exhibition) Agrodome is an indoor arena located at Hastings Park in Vancouver, British Columbia, Canada. It was built in 1963 and holds 5,000 people or 3,260 when configured to use the hockey or lacrosse surface. The venue is owned by the Pacific National Exhibition and is used during the annual fairs for the military tattoo and other shows. In the winter it hosts ice hockey and figure skating events.

It hosted the British Columbia AAA Boys Basketball Championship annually until 2010, after which the tournament moved to the Langley Events Centre.

It was used as a professional wrestling venue by NWA All-Star Wrestling for bigger events in the 1960s and 1970s, and more recently by WWE for smaller events.

It served as the home field for the Vancouver Whitecaps for the 1981–82 NASL indoor soccer season, when the Pacific Coliseum became unavailable.

It was host to the Vancouver VooDoo roller hockey franchise from 1993–94.

It was home to the Vancouver Burrards Western Lacrosse Association team from 1990–93. The team moved to the North Surrey Recreation Centre for the 1994 season.

The venue played the role of the Soviet arena in the climactic fight between Rocky Balboa and Ivan Drago in the movie Rocky IV. It also portrayed Olympic Center in Lake Placid, New York, for the film Miracle. It has also appeared in films such as Slap Shot 2 and Deadpool and in episodes of MacGyver, Booker, and Highlander. It was also disguised as a roller rink for the opening scene in Diary of a Wimpy Kid: Rodrick Rules, due to the lack of a roller rink in Greater Vancouver. Most recently it served as an ice arena in The Mighty Ducks: Game Changers (2021), a reboot of the 1990's The Mighty Ducks movie franchise.

The Agrodome hosted concerts by some of the world's biggest rock acts on their early tours. Some of these acts include The Rolling Stones (1965), Bob Dylan (1966), The Who (1967), Led Zeppelin (twice in 1969), Vanilla Fudge (1969), The Mothers of Invention (1969), Ike & Tina Turner (1970), Pink Floyd (1970), Deep Purple (1972) and Wishbone Ash (1975).

Preceded by Pacific Coliseum	Home of the Vancouver Whitecaps (indoor); 1981–1982	Succeeded by Pacific Coliseum

Preceded by first arena	Home of the Vancouver Voodoo; 1993–1994	Succeeded by Pacific Coliseum

Preceded by Kerrisdale Arena	Home of the Vancouver Burrards; 1990–1993	Succeeded by North Surrey Recreation Centre
