= Chief =

Chief may refer to:

== Title or rank ==
=== Military and law enforcement ===
- Chief master sergeant, the ninth, and highest, enlisted rank in the U.S. Air Force and U.S. Space Force
- Chief of police, the head of a police department
- Chief of the boat, the senior enlisted sailor on a U.S. Navy submarine
- Chief petty officer, a non-commissioned officer or equivalent in many navies
- Chief warrant officer, a military rank

=== Other titles ===
- Chief x officer, a corporate title in the c-suite
- Chief of the Name, head of a family or clan in Ireland and Scotland
- Chief engineer, the most senior licensed mariner of an engine department on a ship, typically a merchant ship
- Chief mate, or Chief officer, the highest senior officer in the deck department on a merchant vessel
- Chief of staff, the leader of a complex organization
- Fire chief, top rank in a fire department
- Scottish clan chief, the head of a Scottish clan
- Tribal chief, a leader of a tribal form of government
- Chief, IRS-CI, the head and chief executive of U.S. Internal Revenue Service, Criminal Investigation

== Places ==
- Chief Mountain, Alberta, a community in Canada
- Chief Mountain, Montana, US
- Chief Mountain Border Crossing, between Alberta and Montana
- Chief Township, Mahnomen County, Minnesota, US
- Stawamus Chief or the Chief, a granite dome in British Columbia, Canada

== People with the name or nickname ==
=== Athletes ===
==== Baseball ====
- Chief Bender (1884–1954), American Major League Baseball (MLB) pitcher
- Sheldon "Chief" Bender (1919–2008) American Major League scouting director and farm system director
- Chief Chouneau (1888–1946), American MLB pitcher and member of the Fond du Lac Band of Lake Superior
- Mel Harder (1909–2002), American MLB pitcher, coach and manager
- Elon Hogsett (1903–2001), American MLB pitcher
- Chief Johnson (1886–1922), American MLB pitcher
- Chief Meyers (1880–1971), American MLB catcher
- Chief Roseman (1856–1938), American MLB player
- Chief Wilson (1883–1954), American MLB outfielder
- Chief Youngblood (1900–1968), American MLB pitcher
- Chief Zimmer (1860–1949), American MLB catcher

==== Other sports ====
- Big Chief Bonner, college football player and engineer
- Peter Graham (fighter) (born 1975), Australian kickboxer, boxer and mixed martial artist
- Chief Jones (1879–1959), American professional ice hockey goaltender
- Chief Kickingstallionsims (born 1986), American basketball player
- Robert Parish (born 1953), American basketball player nicknamed "The Chief"
- Alfred Michael "Chief" Venne (1879–1971), a Native American educator, athletic manager and coach

=== Other people with the name or nickname ===
- C. Alfred "Chief" Anderson (1907–1996), American aviator known as "the Father of Black Aviation"
- Craig Berube (born 1965), Canadian ice hockey player and coach
- Chief Bey (1913–2004), American jazz percussionist and African folklorist
- Éamon de Valera (1882-1975), nicknamed "The Chief", Irish republican leader
- John Diefenbaker, known as "The Chief" (1895–1979), Canadian Prime Minister
- Chief Keef (born 1995), stage name of American rapper and record producer Keith Farrelle Cozart

== Animals ==
- Chief (horse)
- Amauris echeria or chief, a butterfly of southern Africa

== Arts, entertainment, and media ==
=== Fictional characters ===
- Carl "Chief" Kanisky, a character on the American television sitcom Gimme a Break
- Chief (Battlestar Galactica) or Galen Tyrol, a character in Battlestar Galactica
- Chief (DC Comics), the leader of the Doom Patrol
- Chief, a character in The Fox and the Hound
- Master Chief (Halo) or Chief, a character in Halo
- The Chief, a character in Get Smart
- The Chief, a character in the Carmen Sandiego franchise
- The Chief, a character in The Plastic Man Comedy/Adventure Show
- The Chief, a character in T.U.F.F. Puppy

=== Film and television ===
- The Chief (film), a 1933 American comedy
- Chiefs, a 1969 cinema vérité short film by Richard Leacock about the 1968 conference of the International Association of Chiefs of Police
- Chiefs (miniseries), 1983, starring Charlton Heston and Keith Carradine
- The Chief (1990s TV series), a 1990s British crime drama
- Chiefs, a 2002 documentary feature film by Daniel Junge about the Wyoming Indian High School basketball team
- The Chiefs (TV program), a 2018-present Philippine television talk show
- The Chief, a 2024 British mockumentary spinoff of the Scot Squad
- Charlestown Chiefs, a fictional ice hockey team in Slap Shot

=== Literature ===
- Chiefs (novel), 1981, by Stuart Woods
- The Chief (play), a 2003 one-man play about Art Rooney

=== Music ===
- Chief (album), 2011, by Eric Church
- Chief (band), a folk rock band from 2008 to 2011
- Chief Records, a record label from 1957 to 1964
- The Chief (album), 2017, by Jidenna

=== Periodicals ===
- Chief (magazine), a defunct online arts and culture publication
- The Chief (New York newspaper), a newspaper in New York City
- The Chief (Oregon newspaper), a defunct newspaper in Columbia County, northwestern Oregon, US

== Sports organizations and teams ==
=== American football ===
- Kansas City Chiefs, an American football team in Missouri
- South City Chiefs, an American football club competing in the South Australian Gridiron Association league

=== Baseball ===
- Allentown Chiefs, a former minor league baseball team
- Hartford Chiefs, a former minor league baseball franchise representing Hartford, Connecticut
- Paducah Chiefs, a minor league baseball team from Paducah, Kentucky
- Peoria Chiefs, a minor league baseball affiliate in Peoria, Illinois of the Chicago Cubs
- Wenatchee Chiefs, a former minor league baseball team based in Wenatchee, Washington

=== Football (soccer) and rugby ===
- Chiefs (rugby union), a rugby union team in New Zealand
- Atlanta Chiefs, a soccer team based in Atlanta, Georgia
- Exeter Chiefs, a rugby union team in England
- Kaizer Chiefs F.C., a football club in South Africa

=== Ice hockey ===
- Johnstown Chiefs, a former ice hockey team in Pennsylvania that took its name from the fictional Charlestown Chiefs from the film Slap Shot
- Lakefield Chiefs, a Canadian Junior ice hockey team based in Lakefield, Ontario, Canada
- Laval Chiefs, an ice hockey team in Quebec
- Mississauga Chiefs, a former professional women's ice hockey team from Mississauga, Ontario, Canada
- Mississauga Jr. Chiefs, a Canadian Junior women's ice hockey team based in Mississauga, Ontario
- Motor City Chiefs, a former ice hockey organization from Dearborn Heights, Michigan
- Spokane Chiefs, a Western Hockey League ice hockey team from Spokane, Washington

=== Other sports ===
- Chiefs Esports Club, an esports organisation in Australia
- Arellano Chiefs, the athletic teams of Arellano University
- Six Nations Chiefs, a senior lacrosse team in Six Nations of the Grand River, Ontario

== Transport ==
- Chief (train), a named passenger train of the Atchison, Topeka and Santa Fe Railway
  - Southwest Chief Amtrak's successor service to the Chief and Super Chief
  - Super Chief, premium passenger train of the Atchison, Topeka and Santa Fe Railway
- Aeronca 11 Chief, an American two-seat airplane entering production in 1945
- Aeronca 50 Chief, an American light plane of the late 1930s
- Pawnee Chief, an American two-seat helicopter design, first flown in 2005

== United States Navy ships ==
- USS Chief (AMc-67), an Accentor-class minesweeper that served from 1942 until 1945
- USS Chief (AM-31), an Auk-class minesweeper that served from 1943 until 1955
- USS Chief (MCM-14), an Avenger-class mine countermeasures ship commissioned in 1994

== Other uses ==
- Chief (heraldry), a horizontal band on a coat of arms
- Customs Handling of Import & Export Freight (CHIEF), a UK customs computer system
- Chief (women's network), private women's business networking organization

== See also ==
- Chieftain (disambiguation)
- Super Chief (disambiguation)
