= Mfalikuivahaas =

Southern African ruling class

Mfalikuivahaas ("one who is courageous and can address the public") are of chieftain bloodlines, 'Mfalmes', 'Chiefs', from Southern Africa at a time when Sub-Saharan African civilizations were rich in luxury products including incense, gold, ivory, and ebony. The name Mfalikuivahaa was better known when many areas in Africa were ruled through forms of governance that place power in the hands of a small, privileged ruling class of elders, leaders, and Shamans. Such a tribal assembly played an important role in the lives of many Africans contrasting as a form of governance to direct democracy today.

== Origins ==
=== Aggrandizing the dynasty ===
In the late 1700s, early 1800s the area that became Tanganyika, and then Tanzania, a part of the Great Lakes region, consisted of many small kingdoms/ Chieftains. A legitimate function of Chiefs was to aggrandize their dynasties and increase the territory and power of family members. Families of Chiefs sent their children (with the assistance of lower-rank rulers, as well as a large number and levels of advisers who for the most part also occupy their positions by virtue of their family or clan origins and status) to rule or act as security within neighbouring lands of friendly chieftains. This ensured trust in high ranking circles, non-contestation of seats enthroned to siblings in addition to other reciprocal obligations fulfilled by the families carrying out rituals on behalf of the communities. Such mechanisms ascertained that the chief does not rule arbitrarily. In the late 1800s there was a dispersal of the children/grandchildren of Mfalikuivahaa to the outposts where each was said to have made his or her mark in the subsequent urbanization and consolidation of the alliance of chieftains with each child or grandchild fashioning his or her state after their origins.

=== Songea - Salubwiti Mfalikuivahaa ===
Salubwiti and Kamonga Mfalikuivahaa journeyed through Malawi and moved to the Ruvuma Region where Salubwiti Mfalikuivahaa remained to rule in the Namtumbo area while Kamonga Mfalikuivahaa travelled north-seeking land to locate his chieftain. Germans occupied the area around the Great Lakes region since 1897 completely altering many aspects of everyday life. They were actively supported by the missionaries who attempted to change all indigenous beliefs, notably by razing the 'mahoka' huts where the local population worshiped their ancestors' spirits and by scorning their rites, dances and other ceremonies.Songea, (Ruvuma) was the centre of African resistance during the Maji Maji Rebellion in German East Africa temporarily uniting a number of southern tribes.

=== Lubiki Lwamtwa, ‘the staff of a Chief’ - Kamonga Mfalikuivahaa ===
Kamonga Mfalikuivahaa travelled to Utengule where he befriended and was welcomed by Chief Toigali Soliambingu of the Bena people. Kamonga Mfalikuivahaa was installed as head of the chieftain security. Historically, the family members of chiefs in the many kingdoms/ chieftains became soldiers and can trace their origins to military leaders from the migration period. The fundamental idea of a leader was that of essential superiority of the fighting man, usually maintained in the granting of arms. The spear was an outward and visible sign of a "leader and a hunter”. As the best friend of Chief Toigali, Kamonga was given the name Lubiki, ‘the staff of a Chief’ as one is often found next to a Chief.

=== Settling in the Mngeta area ===
A tradition of Bena people included burying the Chief’s right-hand man with him, as an escort in the after life, upon the Chief’s death. Chief Toigali Soliambingi’s death lead Kamonga Mfalikuivahaa to flee the chieftain and finally settle in the Mngeta area (Kilombero District) where he instituted his own, clan seat, seat of the Chief. Practicing polygamy, Kamonga Mfalikuivahaa had forty wives yet only two children from two of his wives, Abiba Makwega and Joahali Makwega. Each of the Makwega sisters had a child, Mohammed and Mira Lubiki Kamonga Mfalikuivahaa . Kamonga Mfalikuivahaa died when his children were infants and his son Mohammed Lubiki grew up with his uncles in Mofu. Mohammed Lubiki went on to have four daughters and four sons with Mdasula Zaina Kitabu. Mohammed Lubiki Kamonga Mfalikuivahaa now referred to simply as Lubiki, inherited his father’s physical strength and was an exceptionally skilled hunter well known for having the house feeding the chieftain.

== The ‘Mfalikuivahaas’ today ==
The Chiefs were suspicious of foreign missionary schools as they thought that a foreign product might prove to have evolved too suddenly in a different world discounting a general view that future constitutional development in Tanzania depended more on the Western educated elite than on the hitherto favoured traditional rulers. ‘Mohammed’ of Islamic inclinations as a result of the Arabization of much of the Tanganyikan population, calculating his sons would remain to rule in the region, only sent his four daughters to be stewarded by Sister Solana (Baldegger sisters, Order of Friars Minor Capuchin) in Ifakara.

In the 1960s, East Africa’s nationalists set out to build independent states by dismantling tribes and chieftains. ‘A truly socialist state is one in which all people are workers and in which neither capitalism nor feudalism exists”. There followed the largest resettlement effort in the history of Africa: nearly 70 percent of Tanzania’s rural people were uprooted and settled in collective villages. Alongside the growth of nationalist movements among the educated elite and the organization of trade unions among workers, there was a disruption of chieftain family politics, a restructuring of ethnic identification, and a resort to modern solutions.

Several members of the family are now educated abroad in Swiss private schools (alongside leaders including Kim Jong-un; the supreme leader of North Korea), the United Kingdom and United States.

== Sources ==
- Chami, F. A. 2002 The Swahili World. In F. A. Chami and G. Pwiti, editors, Southern Africa and the Swahili World. Dar es Salaam: Dar es Salaam University Press.
- Final reports by doctors to SolidarMed in the late 1980s in ASML. For a general argument on this in the case of Tanzania see: Aili Mari Tripp, Changing the Rules: the Politics of Liberalization and the Urban Informal Economy in Tanzania (Berkeley, 1997). See also the work of the health economist Lucy Gilson on Kilombero, e.g. in L. Gilson, M. Alilio, and K. Heggen hougen, “ Community satisfaction with primary health care services: an evaluation undertaken in the Morogoro Region of Tanzania.” Social Science and Medicine 39(6) (1994), L. Gilson and J.Rushby. Recurrent Cost Analysis of Selected Patient Care Centres in SFDDH, Ifakara, 17.06.1991
- ASML: R3T6O1quer Vor 94 Diverse Berichte Tansania SFDDH.
- Interviews of prominent elders remaining in Ifakara - stories of Ifakara ancestry
- Larson, L. E. 1976 A History of the Mahenge (Ulanga) District, c.1860-1957. PhD dissertation, University of Dar es Salaam
- I.J.Lweis, Education and Political indeppendece in Africa: and Political Independence in Africa: and other Essays (Edinburgh: Thomas Nelson and Sons, 1962
