= Domboshaba =

Historic site in Masunga, Botswana

Domboshaba Monument
- Domboshaba
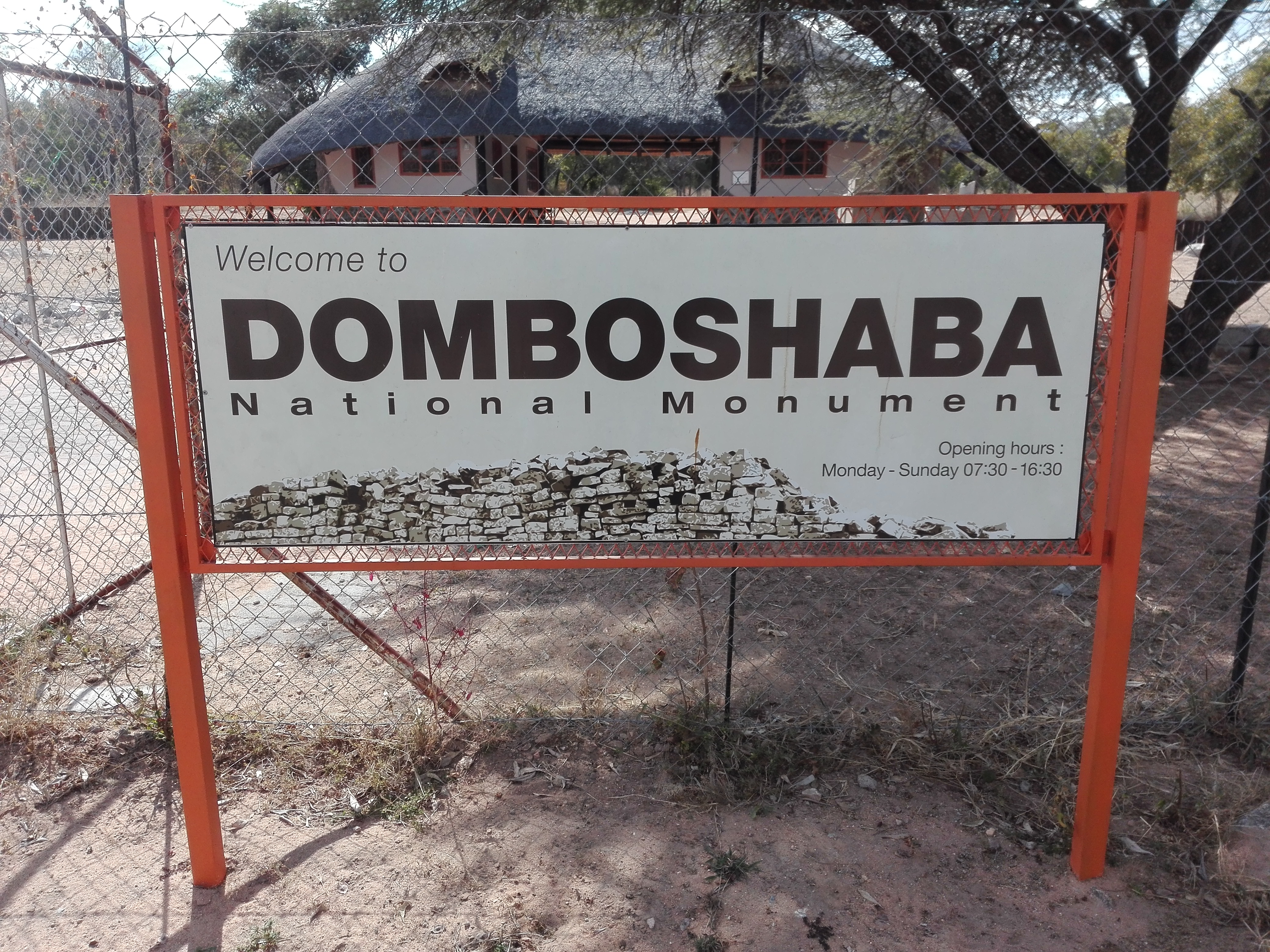
- Domboshaba heritage site
- Interactive map of Domboshaba Monument
- Location: Masunga Village
- Coordinates: 20.602613°S 27.372925°E
- Type: Monument
- Height: 1.8m
- Opening date: (1250–1450 AD)
- Restored date: 2005
- Dedicated to: History of Bakalaka

Domboshaba is a dry-stone walled hilltop site located in the north-east of Botswana. It is a cultural and heritage site in Botswana originally occupied towards the end of the Great Zimbabwe period. The phrase Dombo means hill and the word Shaba means red (translated from the Ikalanga language means "red" or eland Hill).Domboshaba is also called the Luswingo used to be the settlement of the Great chief of that time.

It was one of the first national monuments to be gazetted in the country in 1938.

== Geographical location ==
Domboshaba is located in the northeast of Botswana, near Masunga Village (Along Kalamati road).

== Historical background ==
The place is believed to have been established in the 15th Century. The site was occupied towards the end of Great Zimbabwe period.It is also known as Zimbabwe site in Botswana becuse of its origin.The place functioned as a home for regional chief between two traditions which is Batua and Kalanga. It is a respected place for the people living in the region and it is believed that the chief lived on the top of the hill together with his helpers or assistants.

Domboshaba ruins is the first archaeological excavation to be done in Botswana by German explorers. What remains today as a constant reminder of the existence of the once mighty empire are the relics, such as stone walls, pottery pieces and grinding stones. Hence the place today is famously known as Domboshaba ruins.

The ruins are similar to the Mwenemotapa. The chief's wife settled below the hill. Domboshaba has other ranges of hills along it, a natural water well located in Mantenge hill, called Mantenge Well which never dries up: the well is 7 metres deep and is situated in the rock.

== Archaeological features ==
=== Grinding stone ===
The milling stone was used to grind food-stuffs such as tobacco and groundnuts.

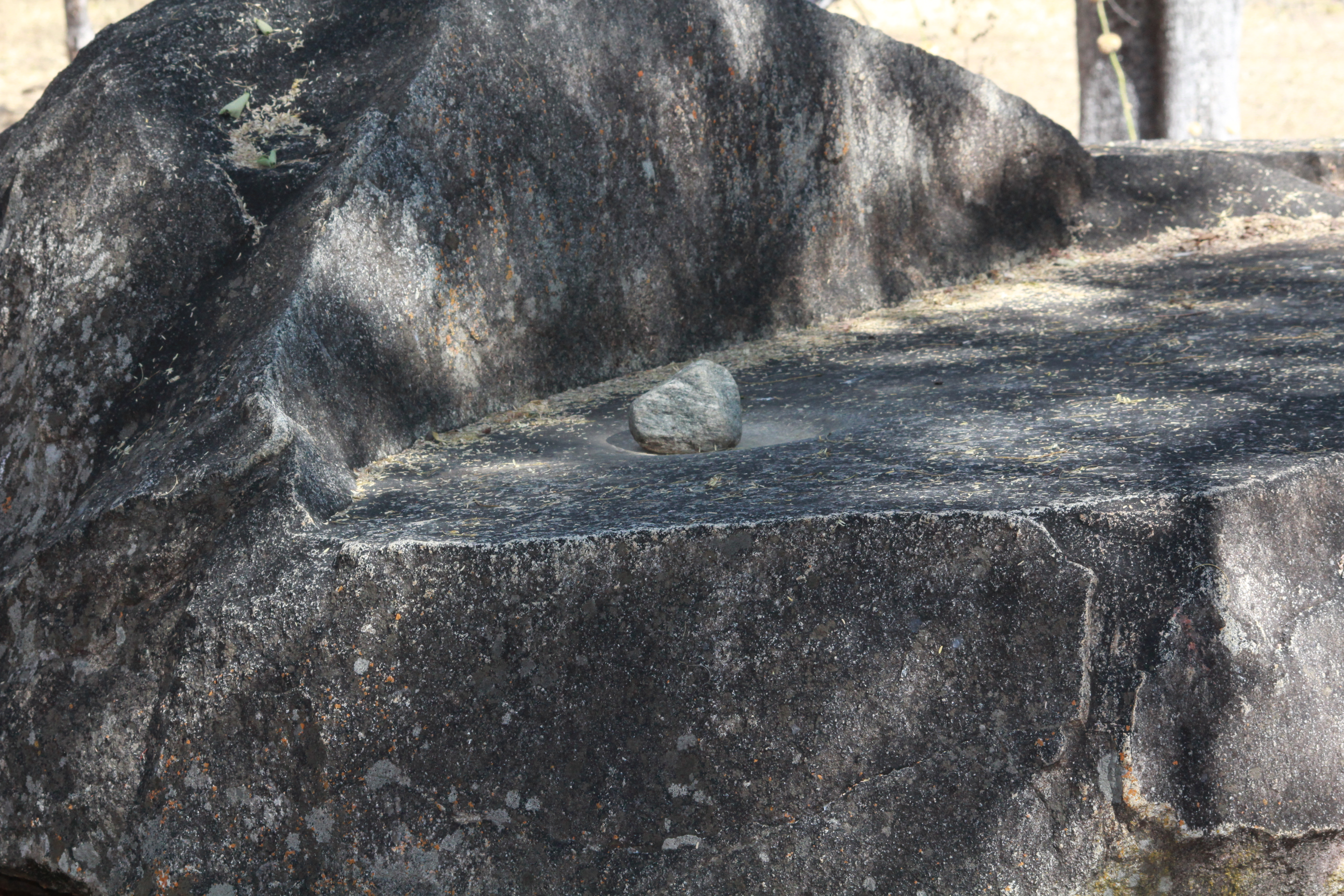
The grinding stone used at the heritage site for grinding tobacco and ground nuts

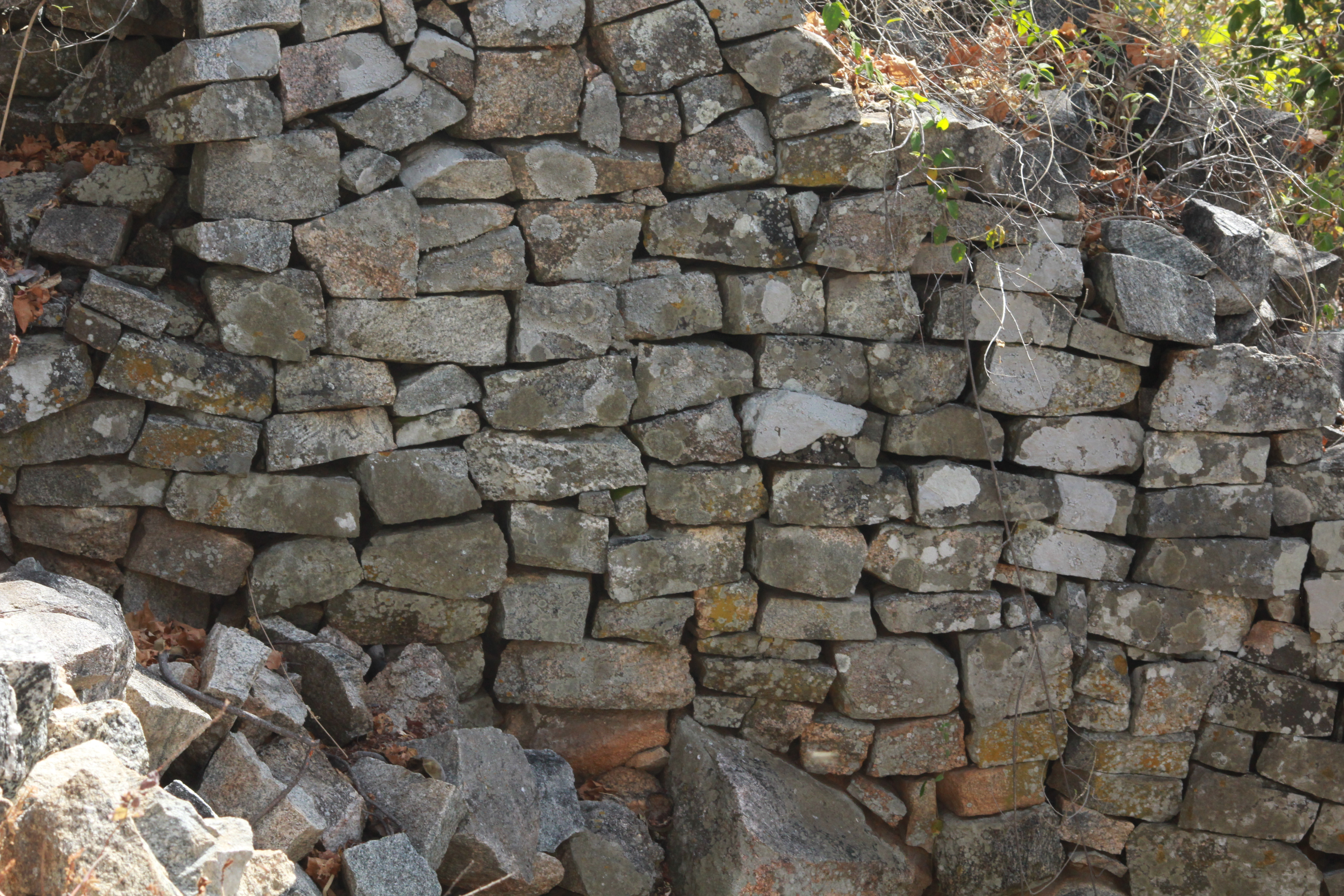
Domboshaba Stone wall

=== Stone walls ===
The walls stand at 1.8m tall and up to 2m thick, they vary according to dimensions, and decorations..

=== Dakha floors ===
There are remains of several dakha floors found at the Domboshaba monument made of soil mixed with cow dung spread across the monument. The older dakha house floors were exposed by amateur archaeologists and soil erosion over time. These floors were made with soils that have high ratio of clay to gravel. It is believed that the house floors were fired to strengthen them for longer periods.

== Cultural Heritage ==
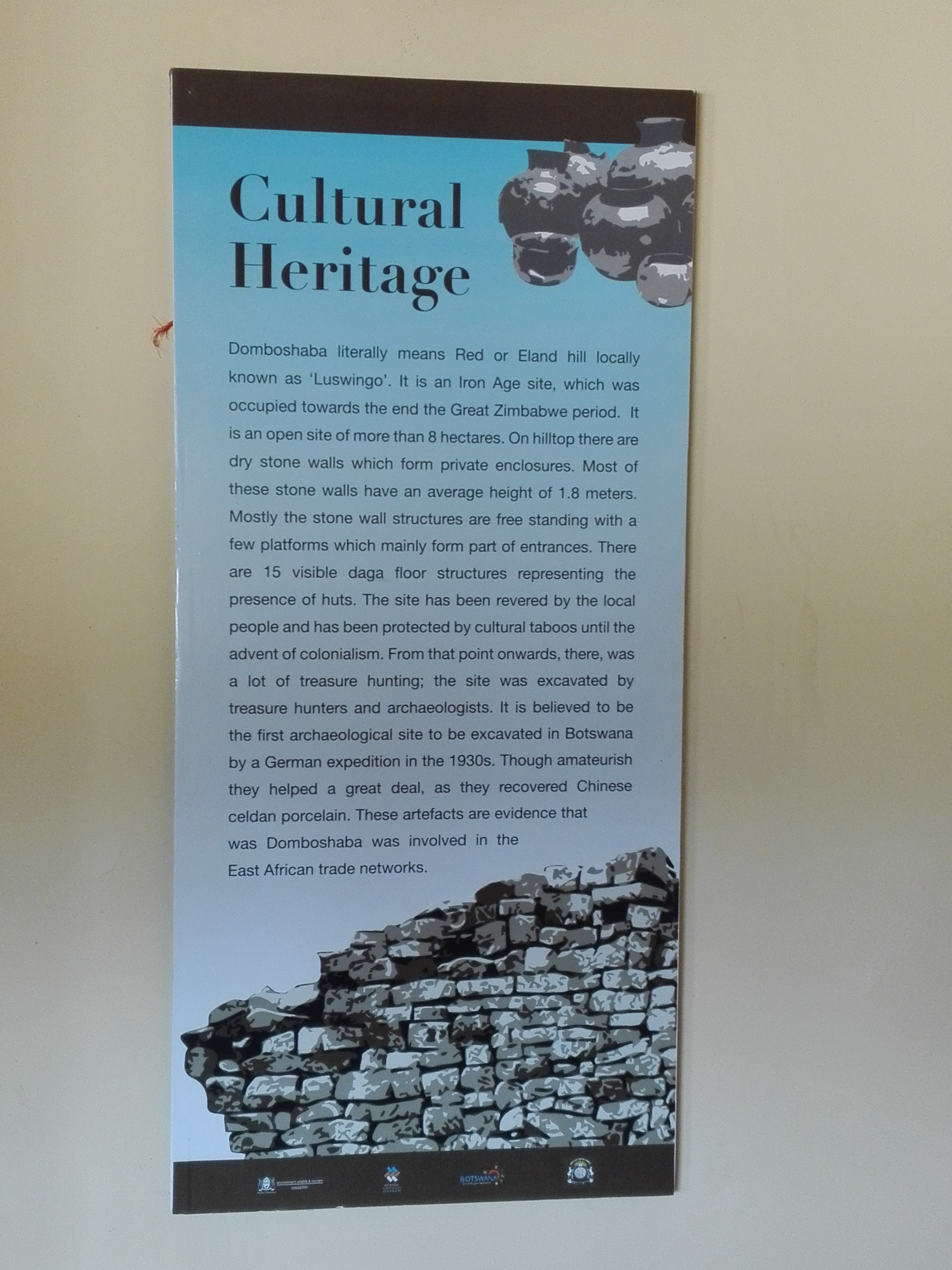
Cultural heritage

Domboshaba is an open site of more than 8 hectares. On the hilltop there are dry stone walls which form private enclosures. Most of these stone walls have an average height of 1.8 metres. The stone wall structures are mostly free standing with a few platforms which mainly form part of the entrances. There are 15 visible daga floors representing the presence of huts. The site has been revered by local people and has been protected by local taboos until the advent of colonialism, from that point onwards there was a lot of treasure hunting, the site was excavated by treasure hunters and archaeologists.

=== Rules at the site ===
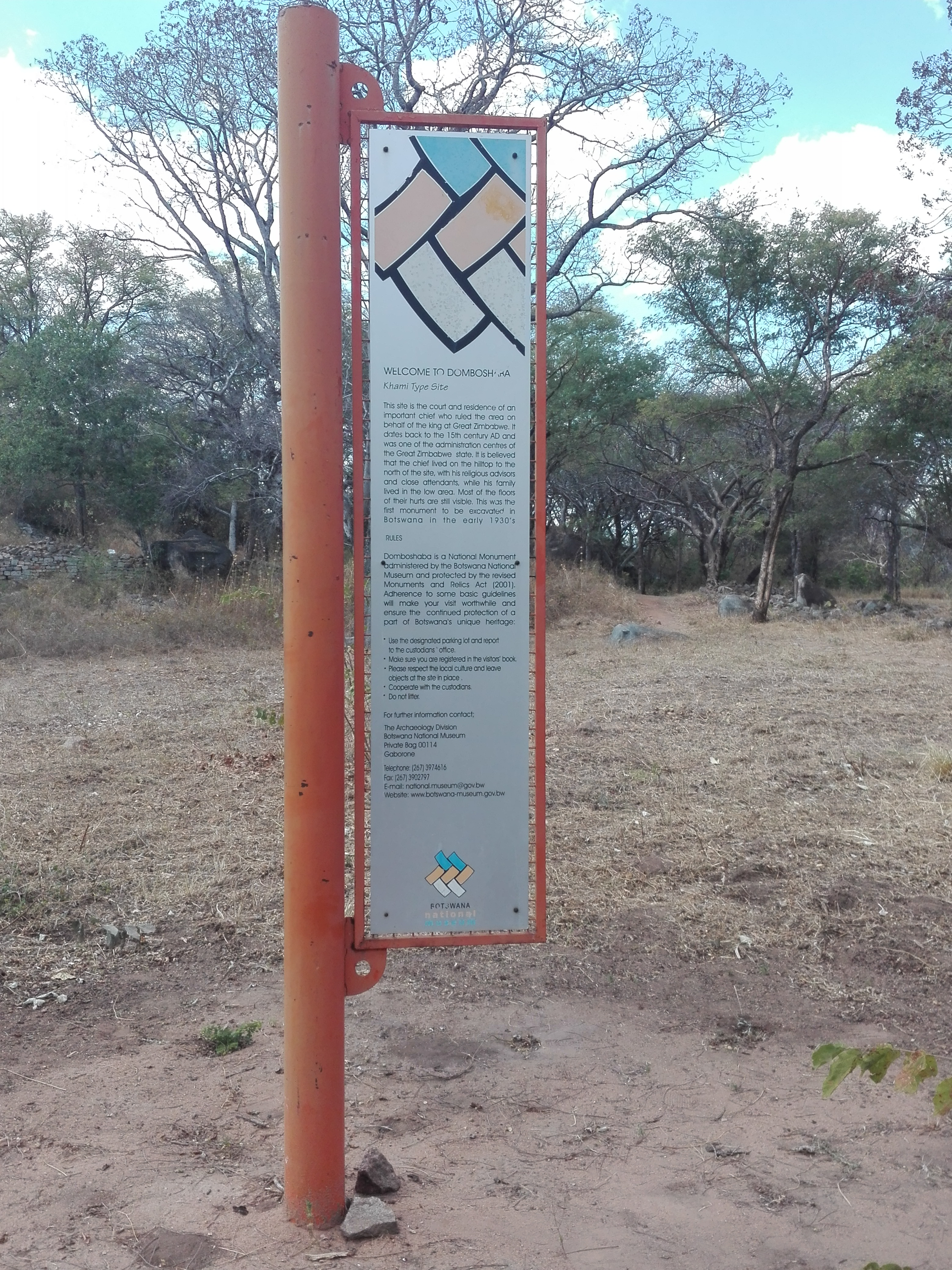
Rules at Domboshaba monument

Rules
Domboshaba is a national monument administered by the Botswana National Museum and protected by the revised Monuments and Relics Act (2001).

== Images of Domboshaba ==
Domboshaba in Pictures

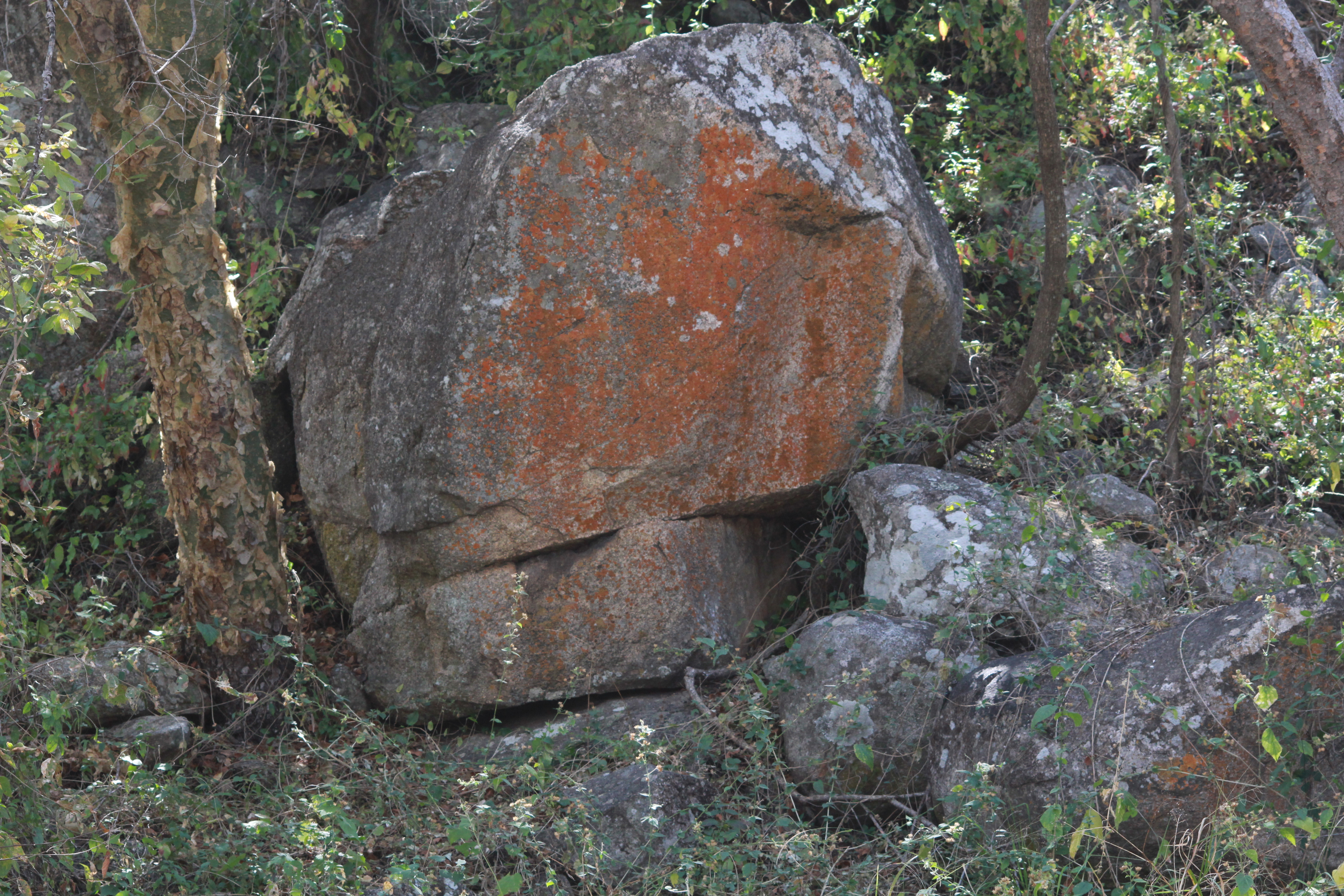
Stone at the monument

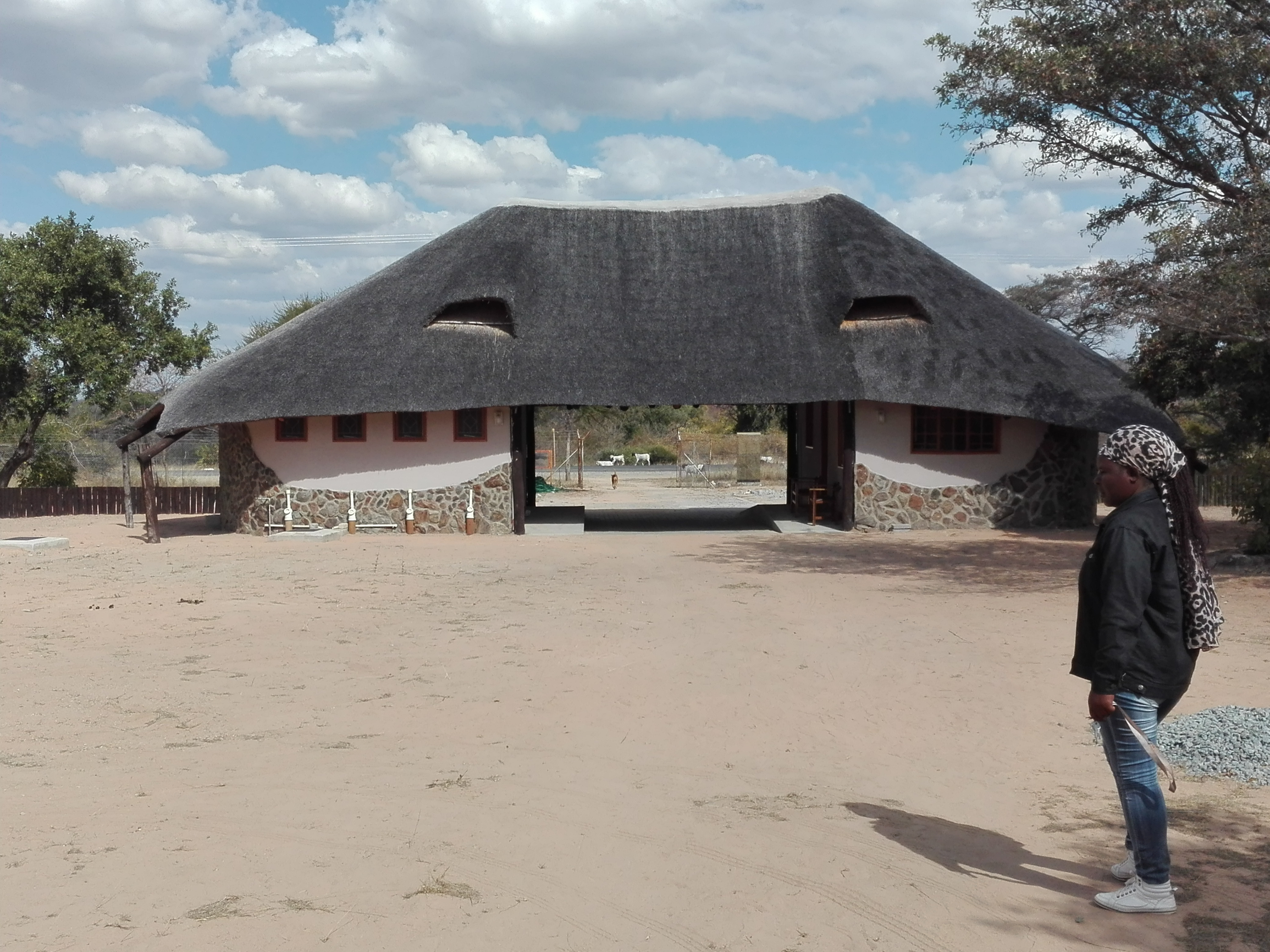
entrance of Domboshaba Monument(Gate house)

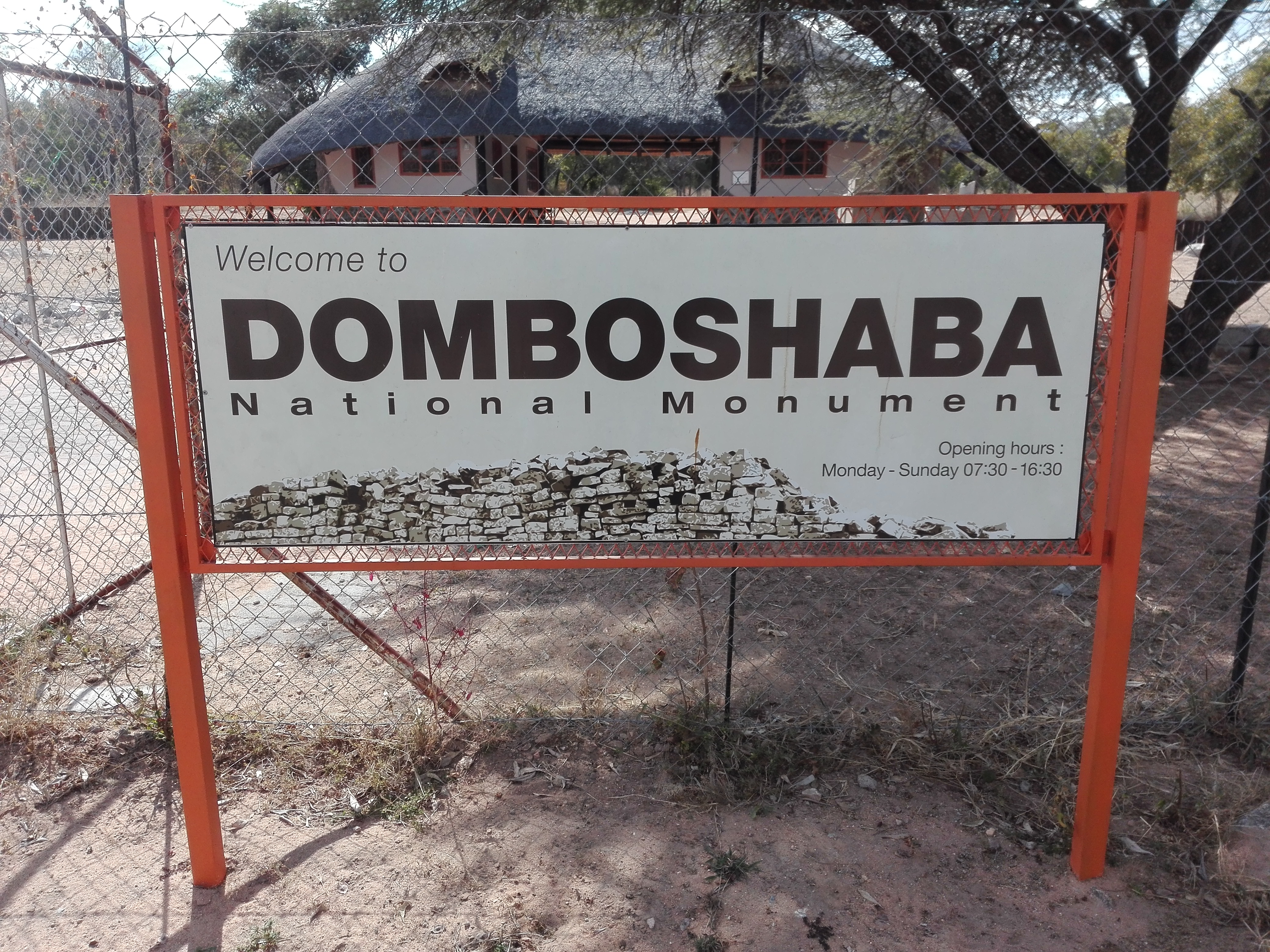
Domboshaba

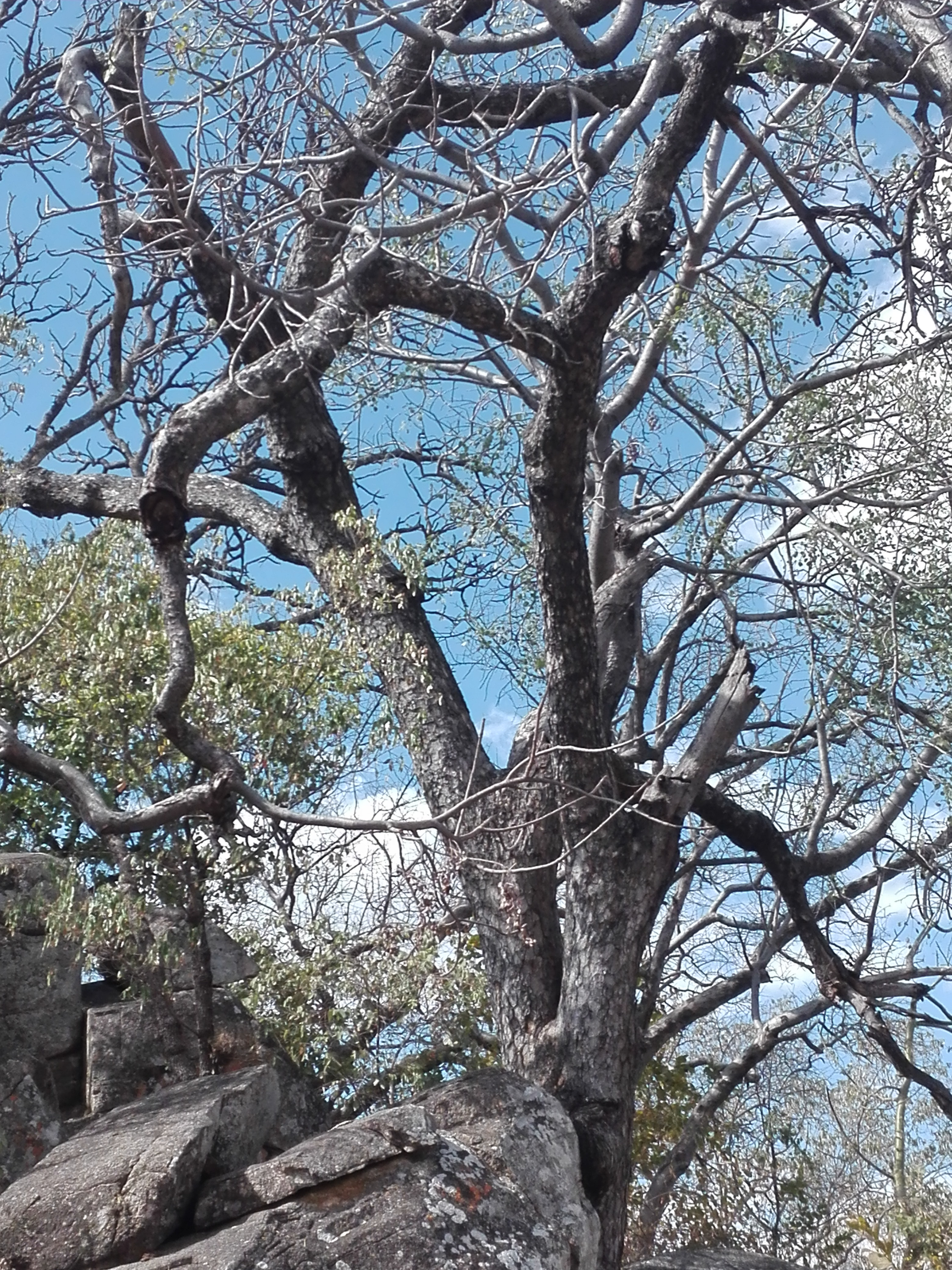
Trees at Domboshaba

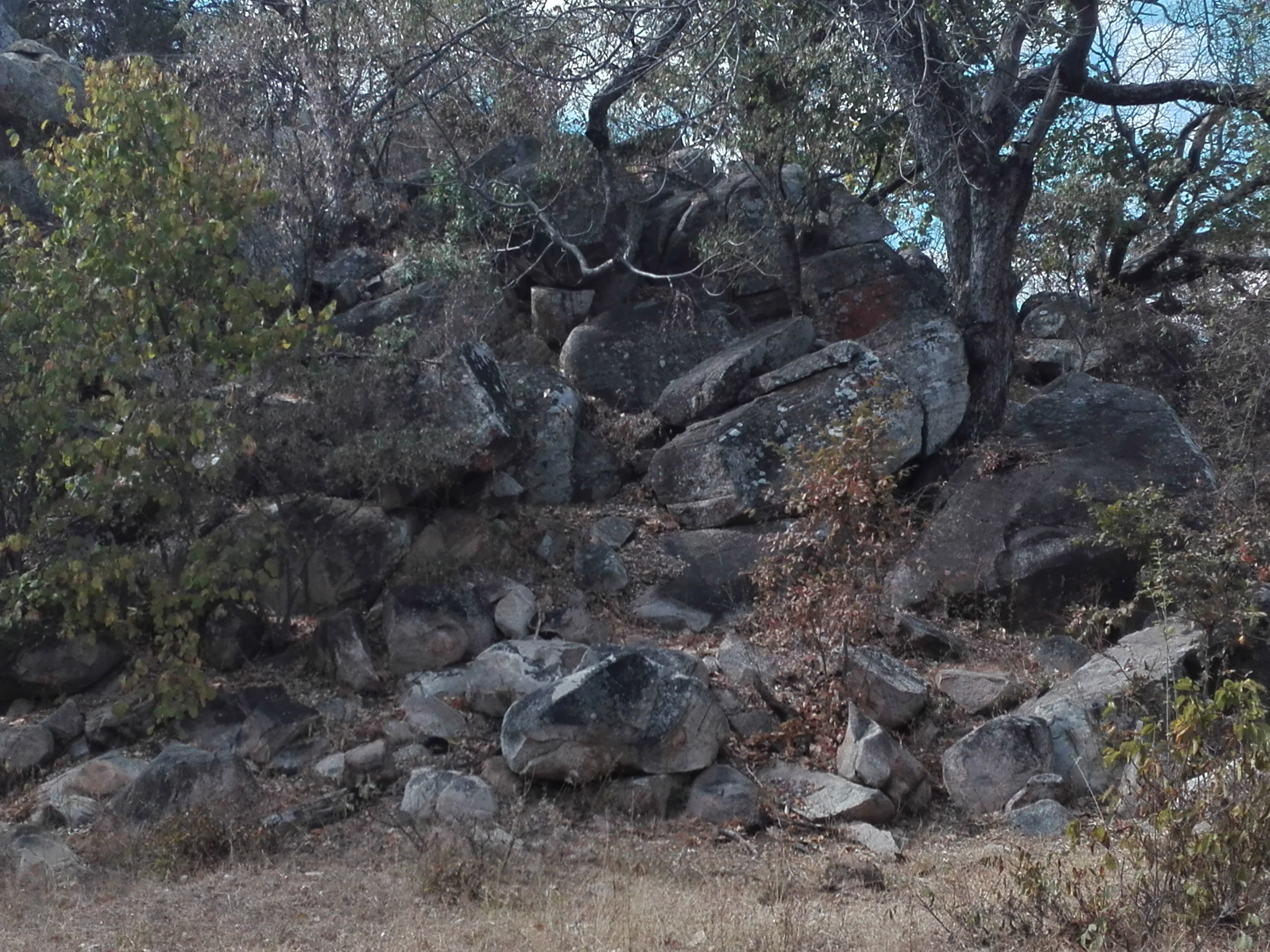
Trees at Domboshaba

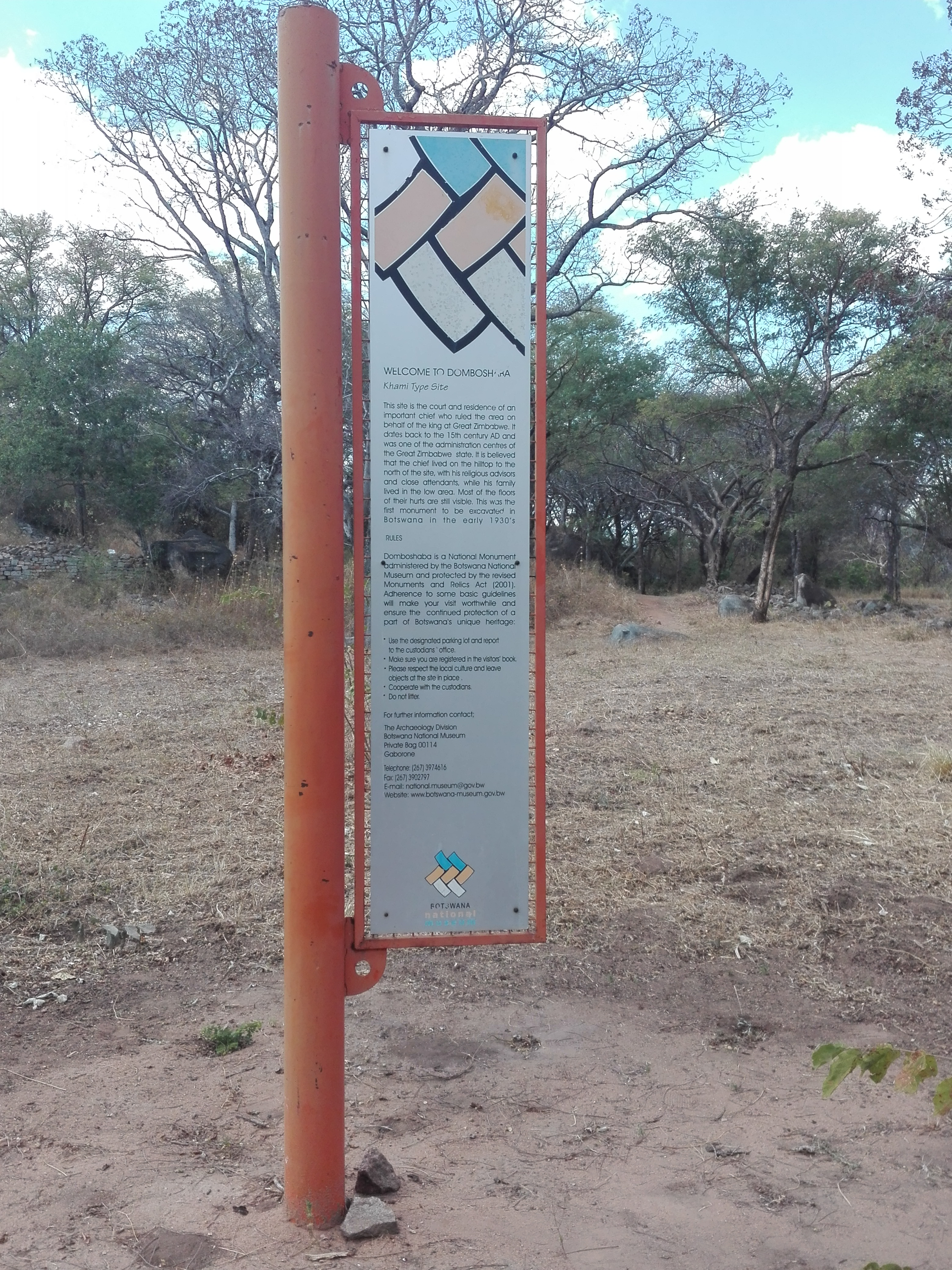
Welcome to Domboshaba (Khami type site)

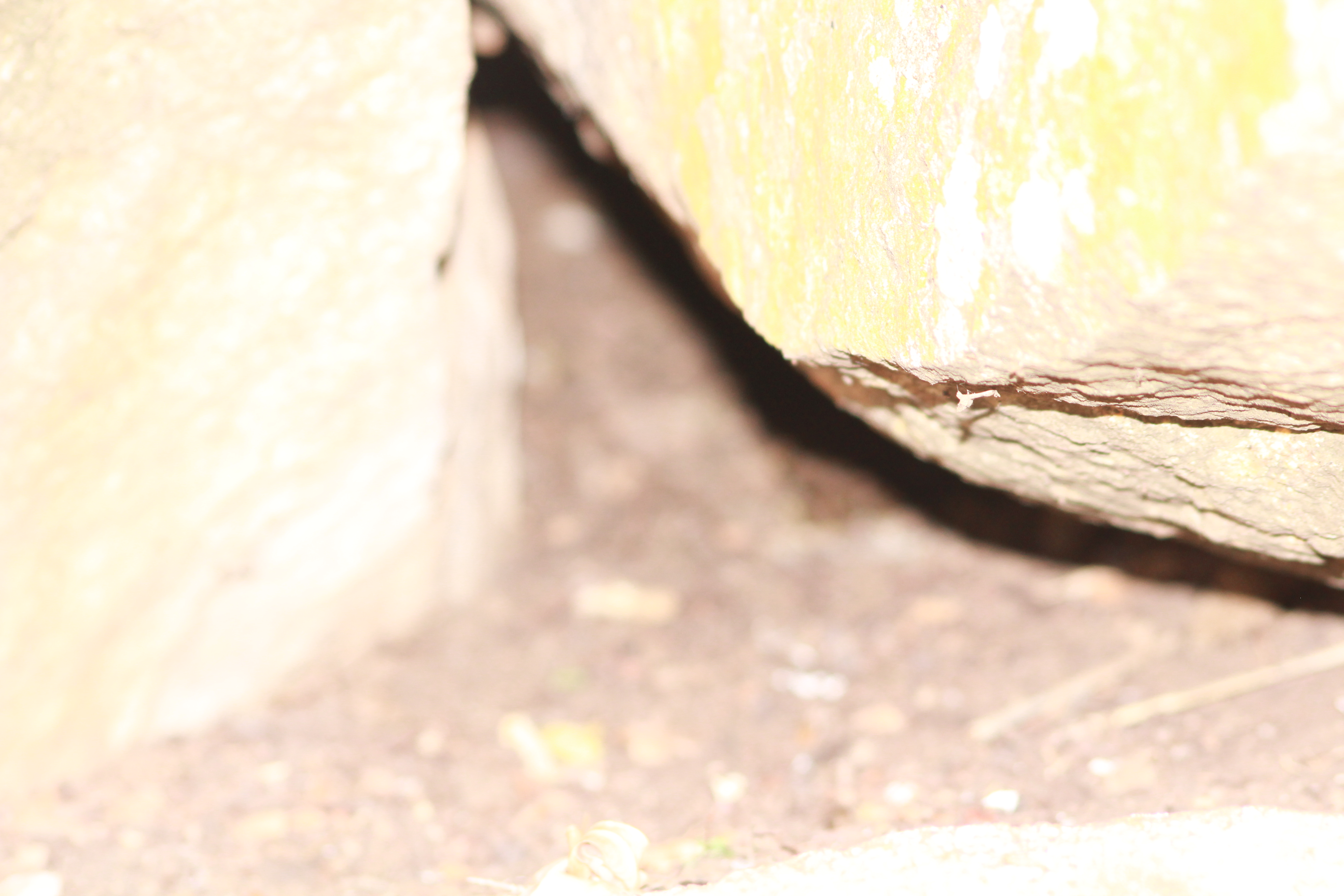
caverns at the site

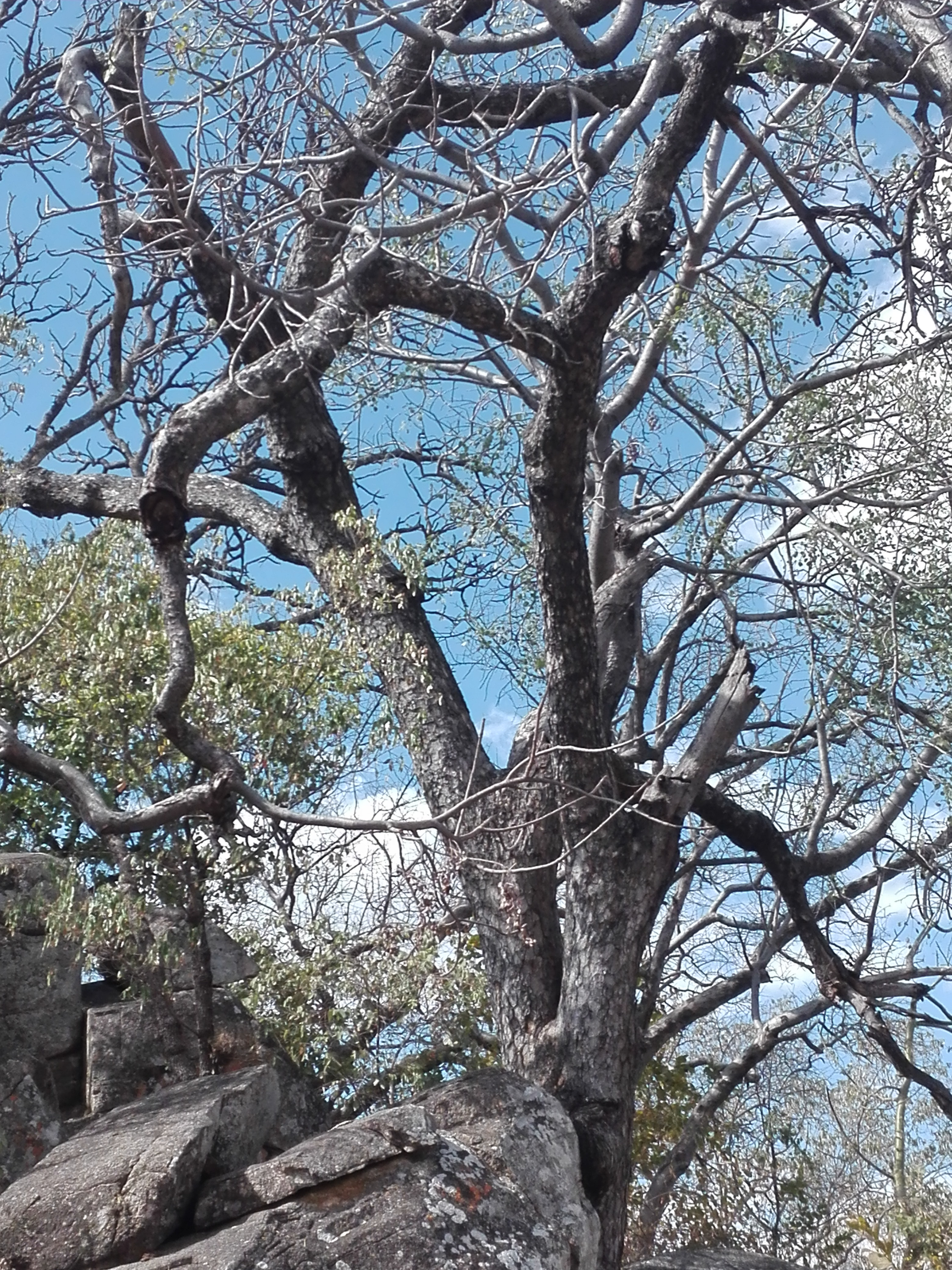
Trees at the site

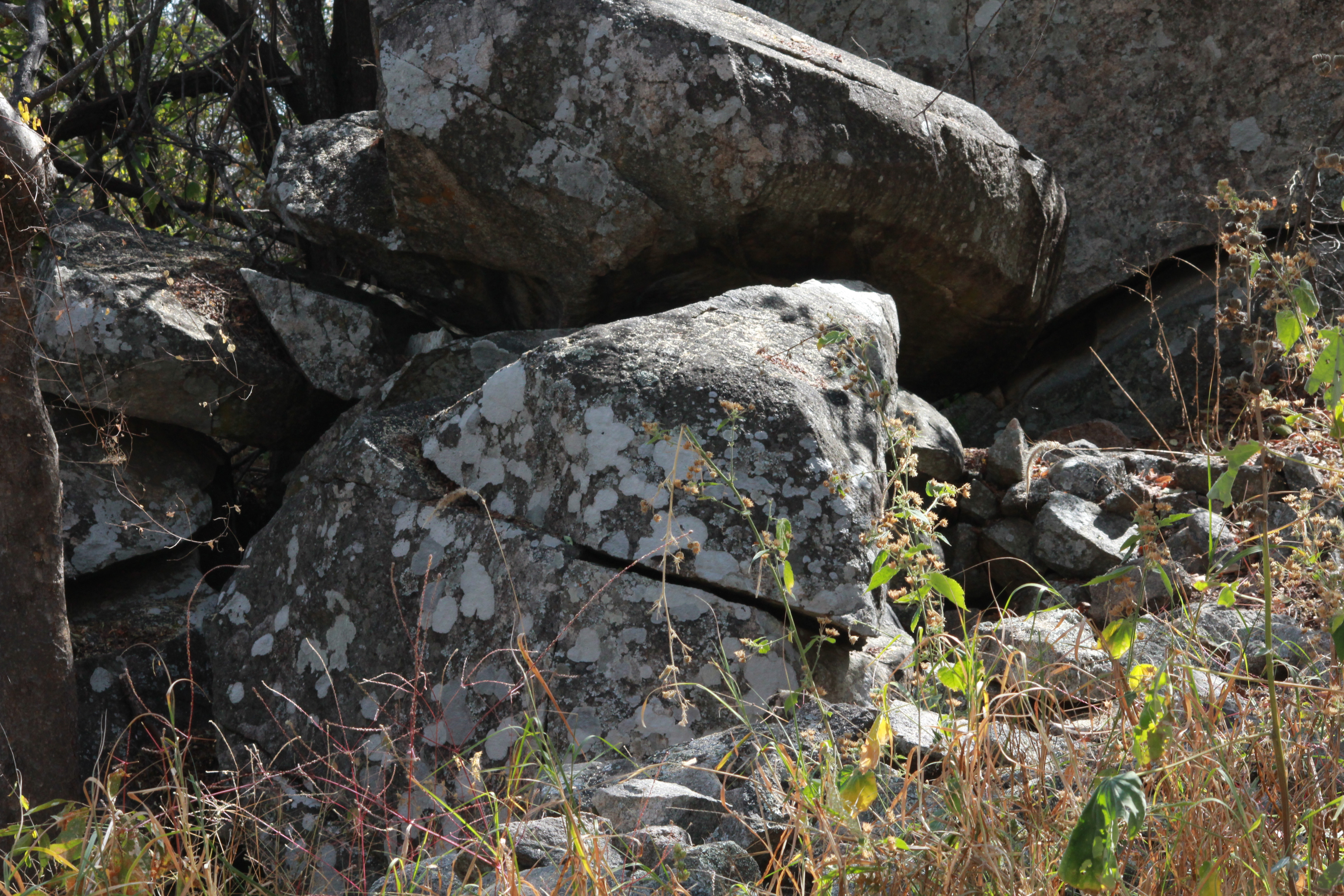
Stone walls

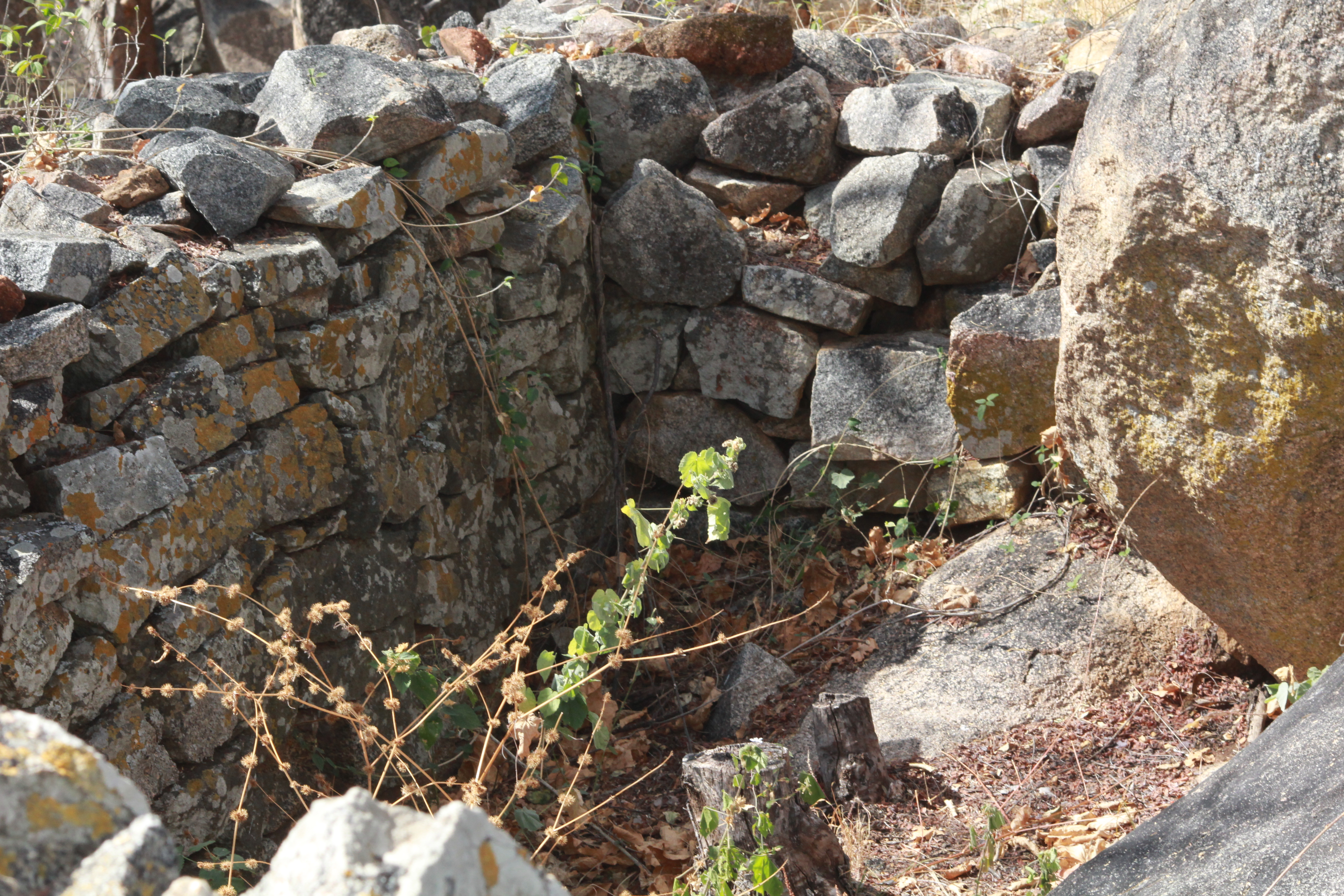
Stone walls

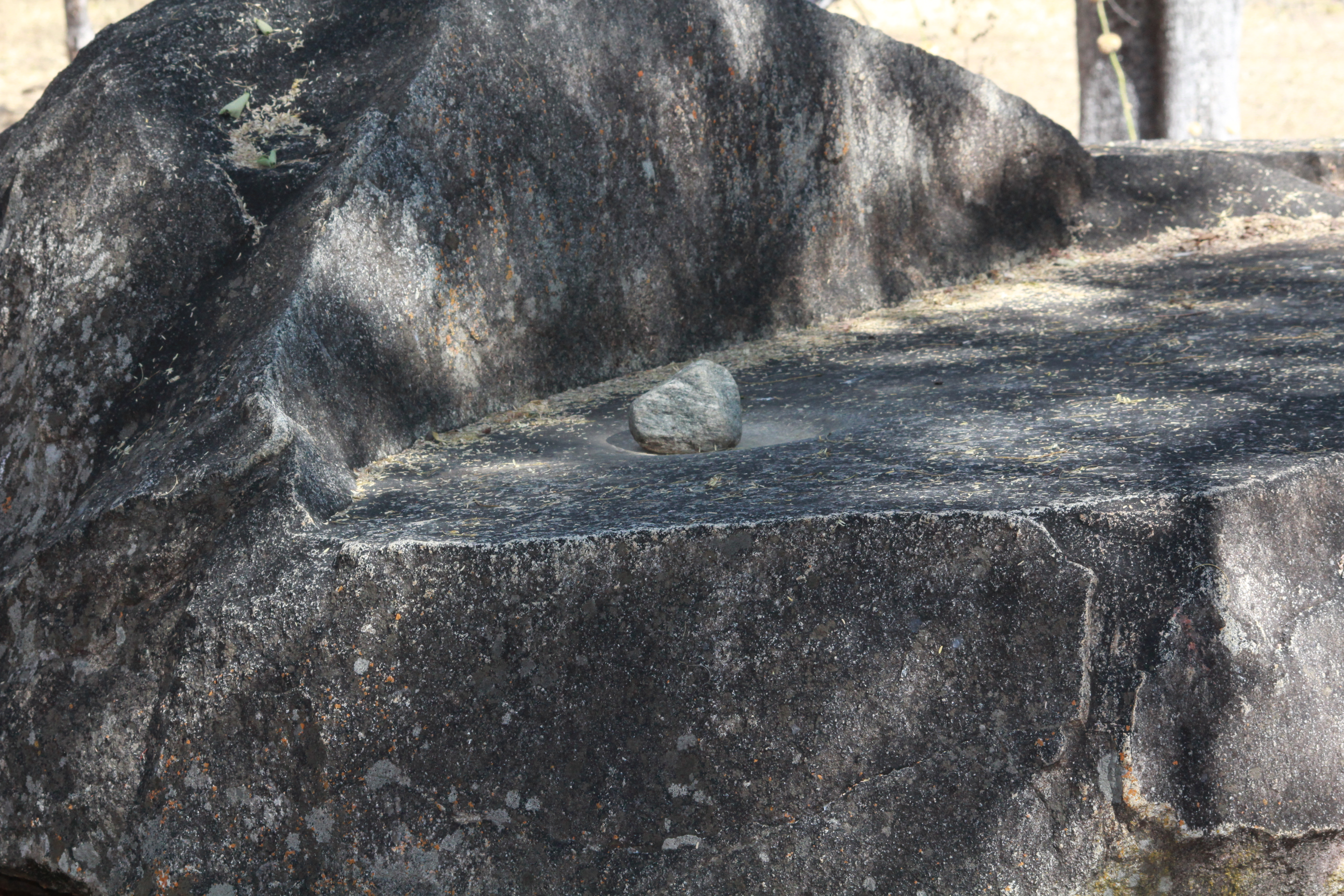
The grinding stone (used for grinding tobacco)

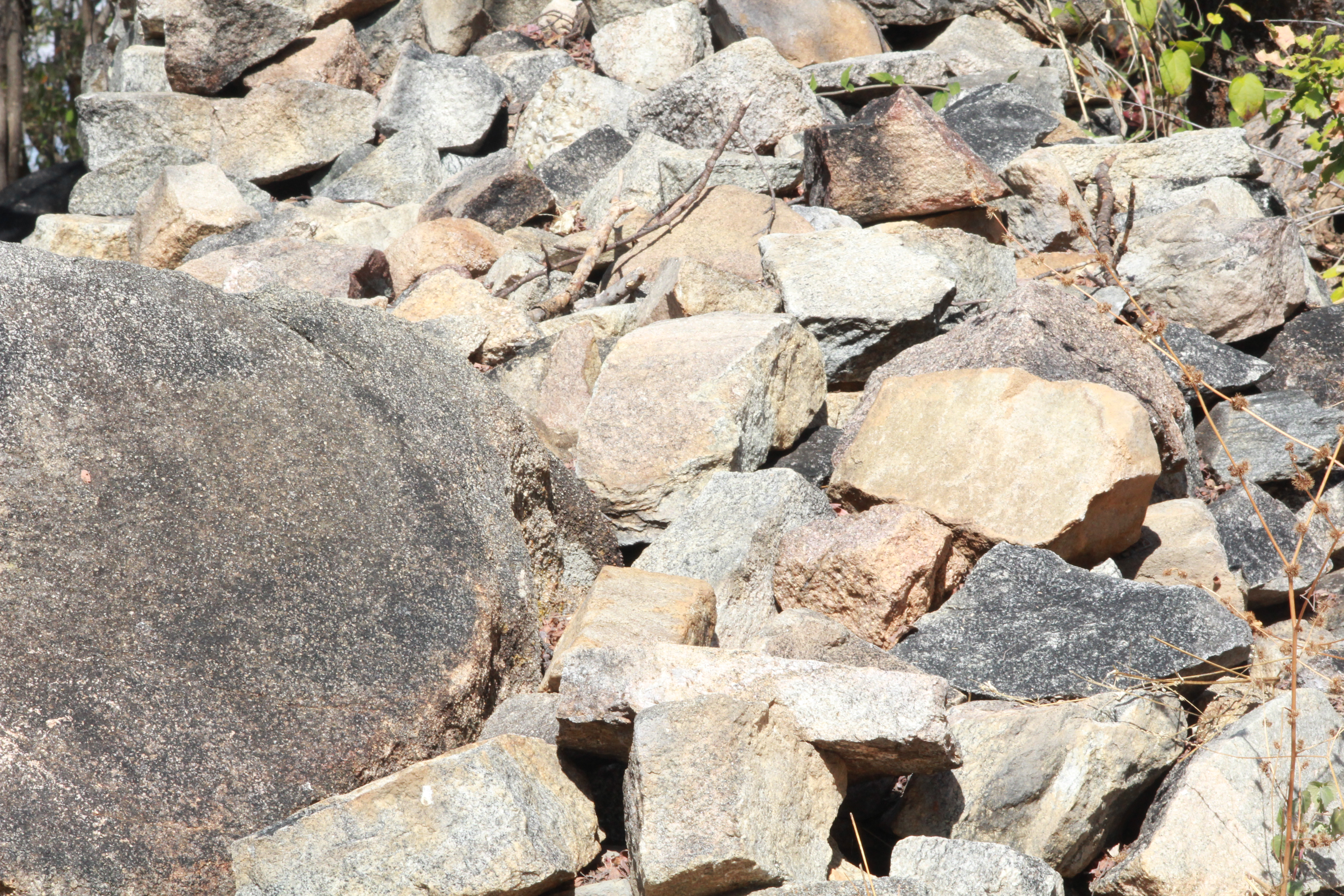
Pathway designed by people who were staying there in the past.

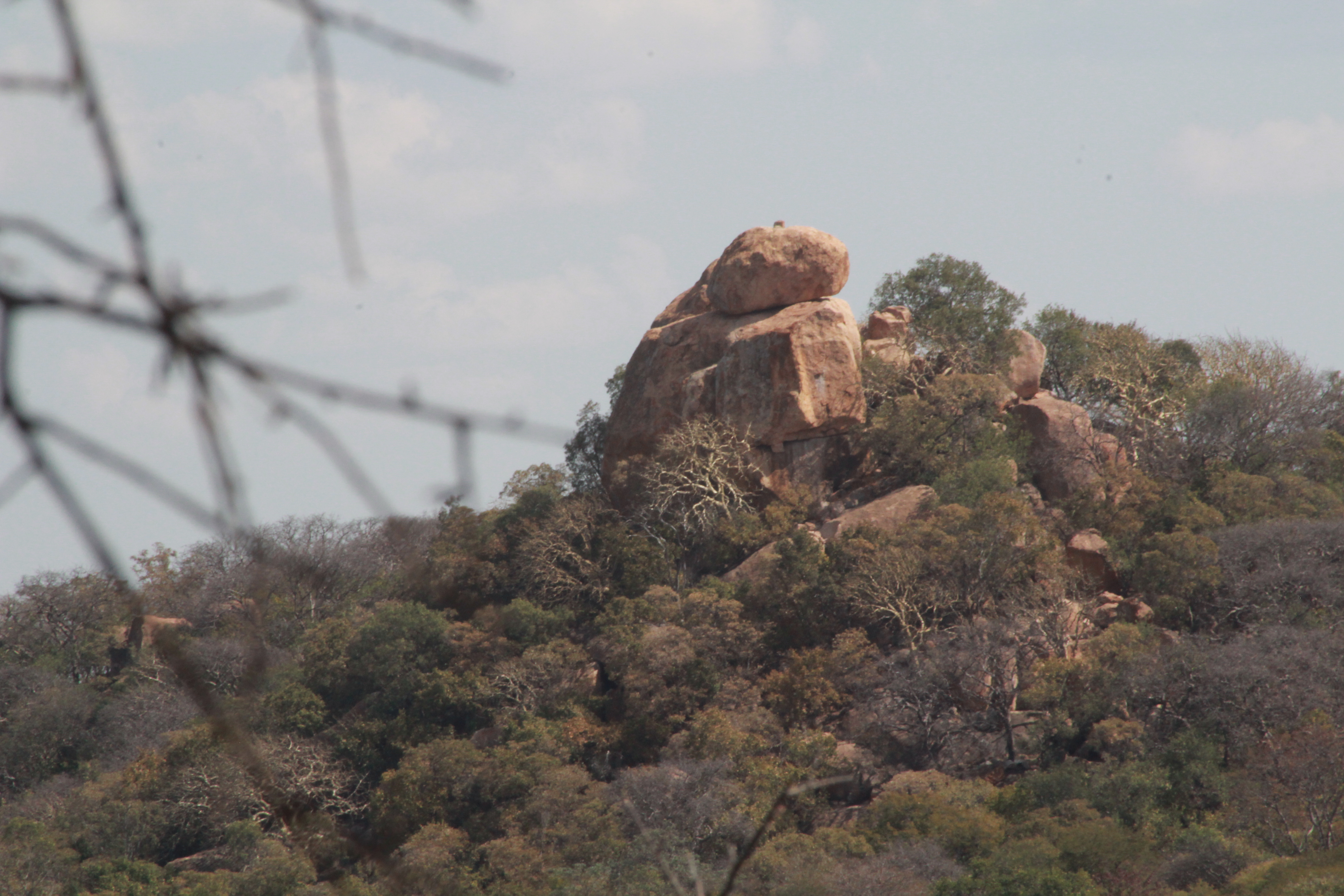
Domboshaba hill

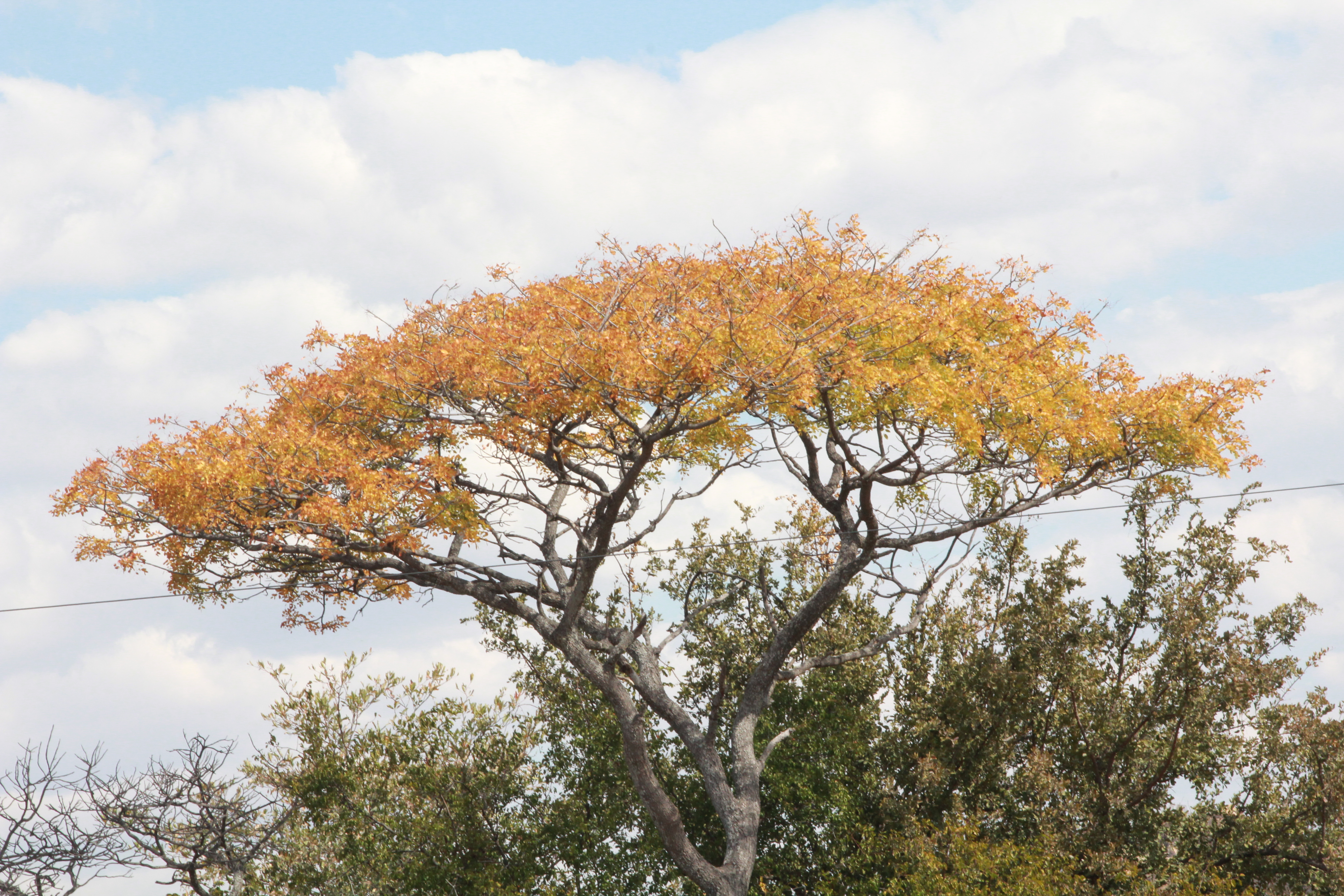

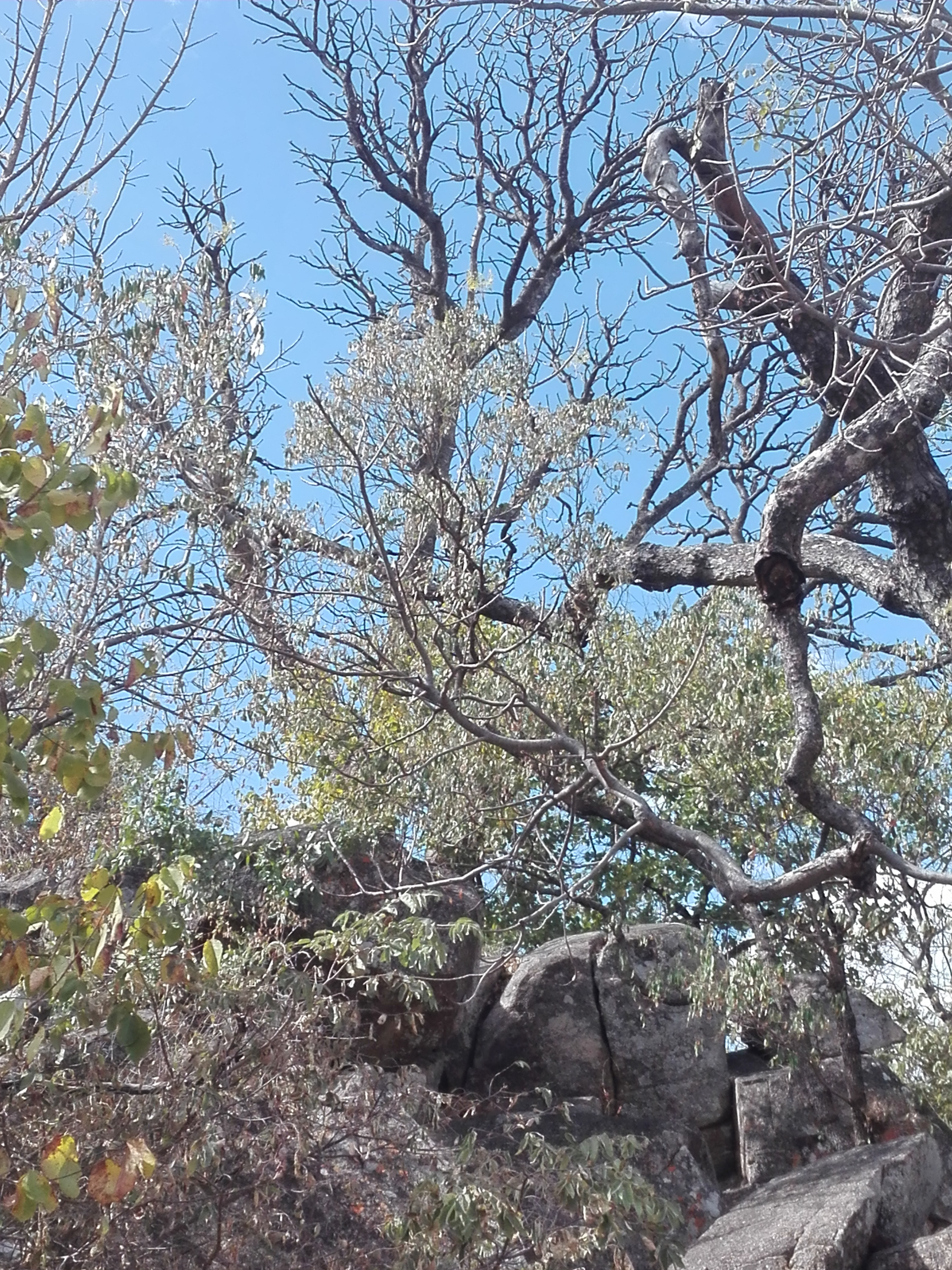

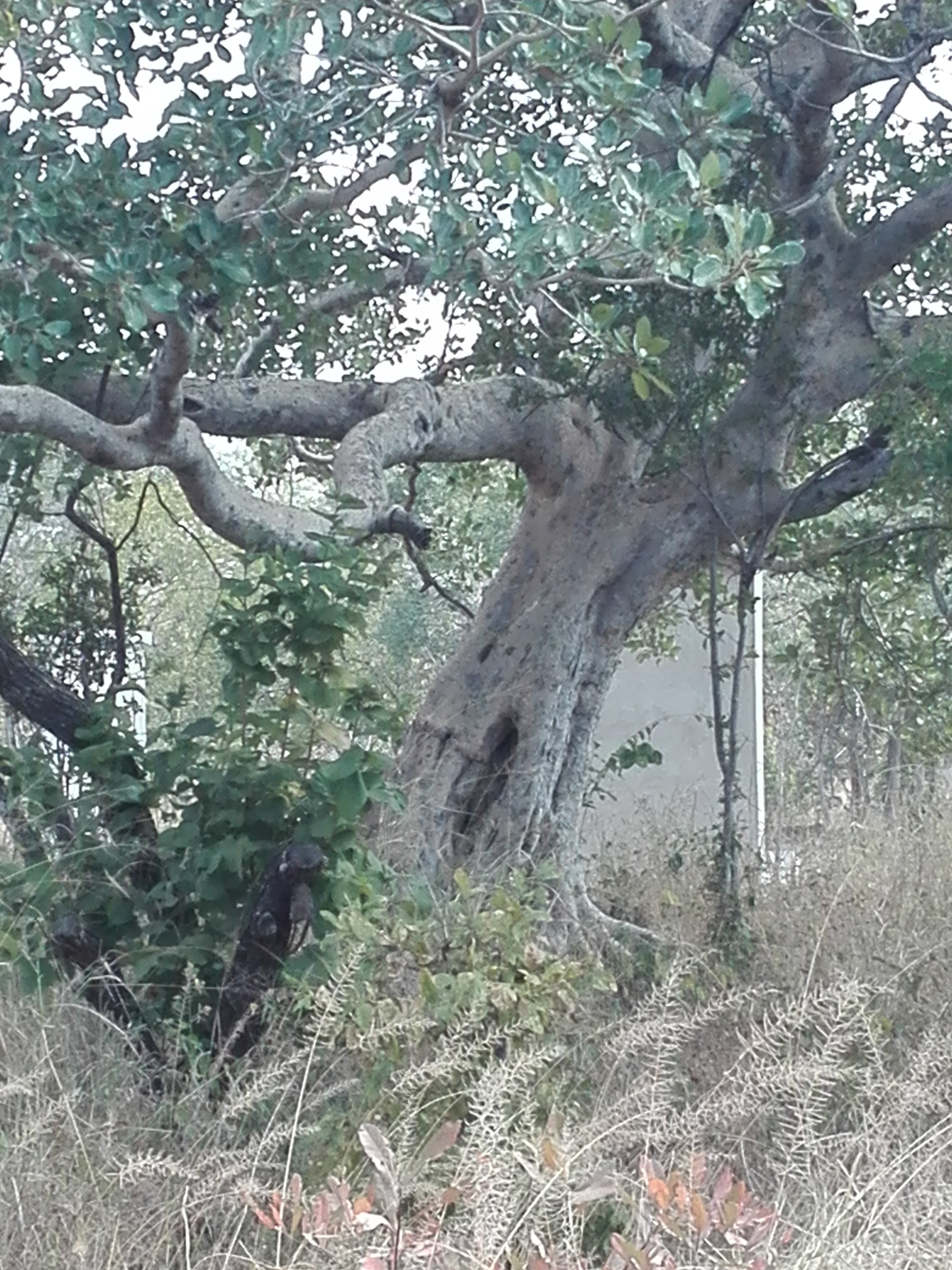

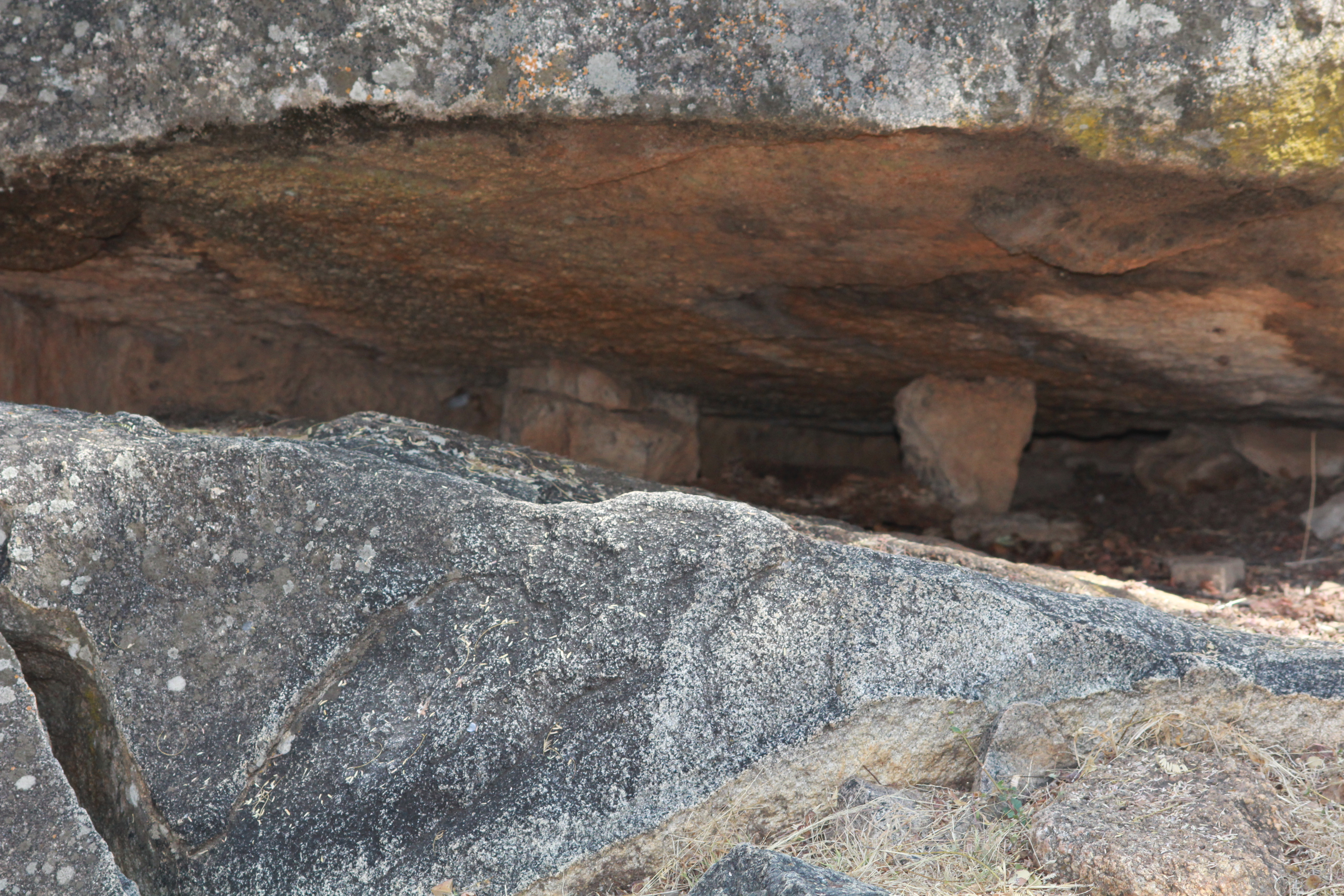

== Domboshaba gate house ==
The Domboshaba gate house was constructed and opened by the Kalakamati Community through the Ipelegeng programme (Self reliance) in collaboration with the department of national museum and monuments.

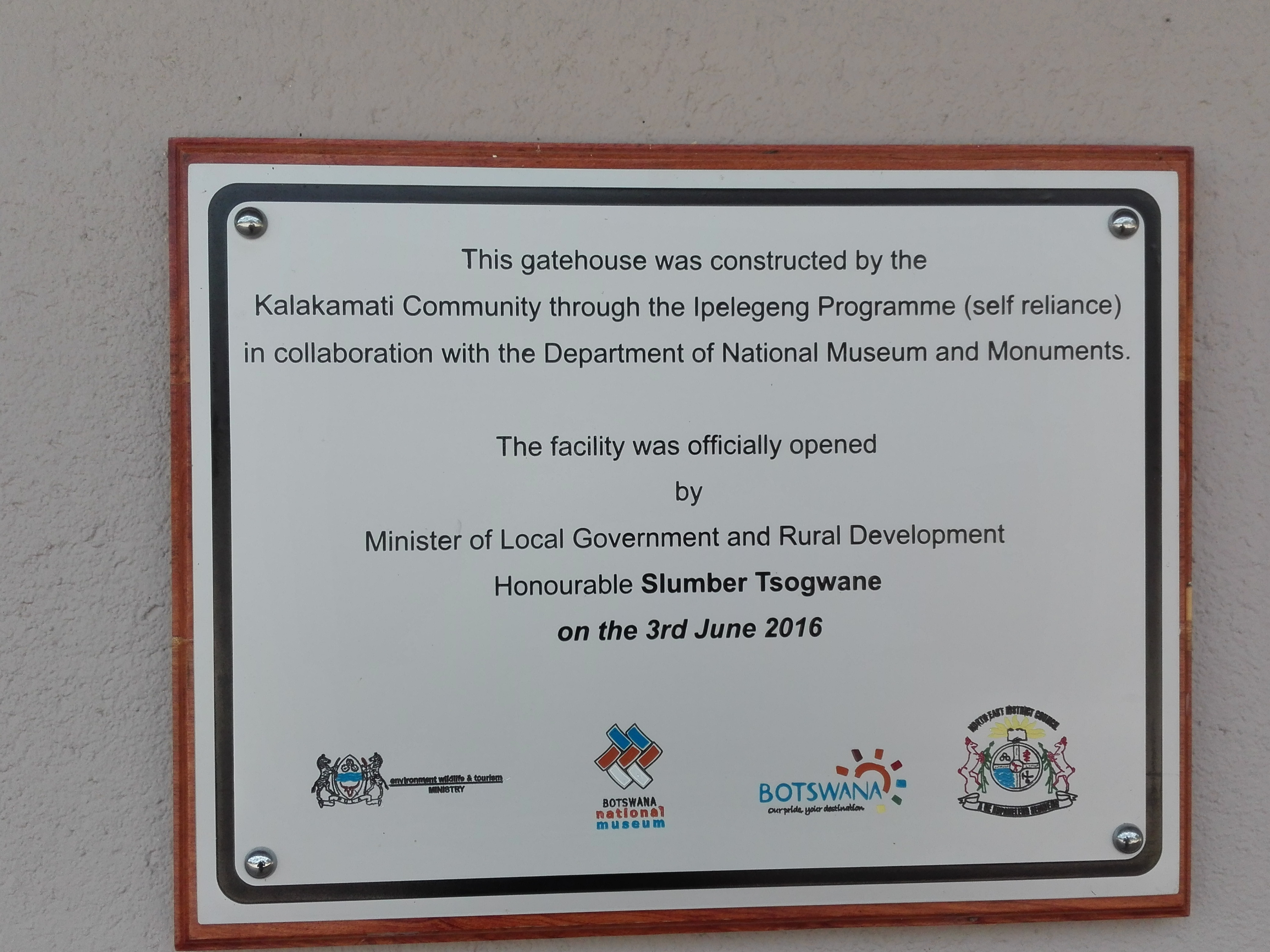
Domboshaba gate house

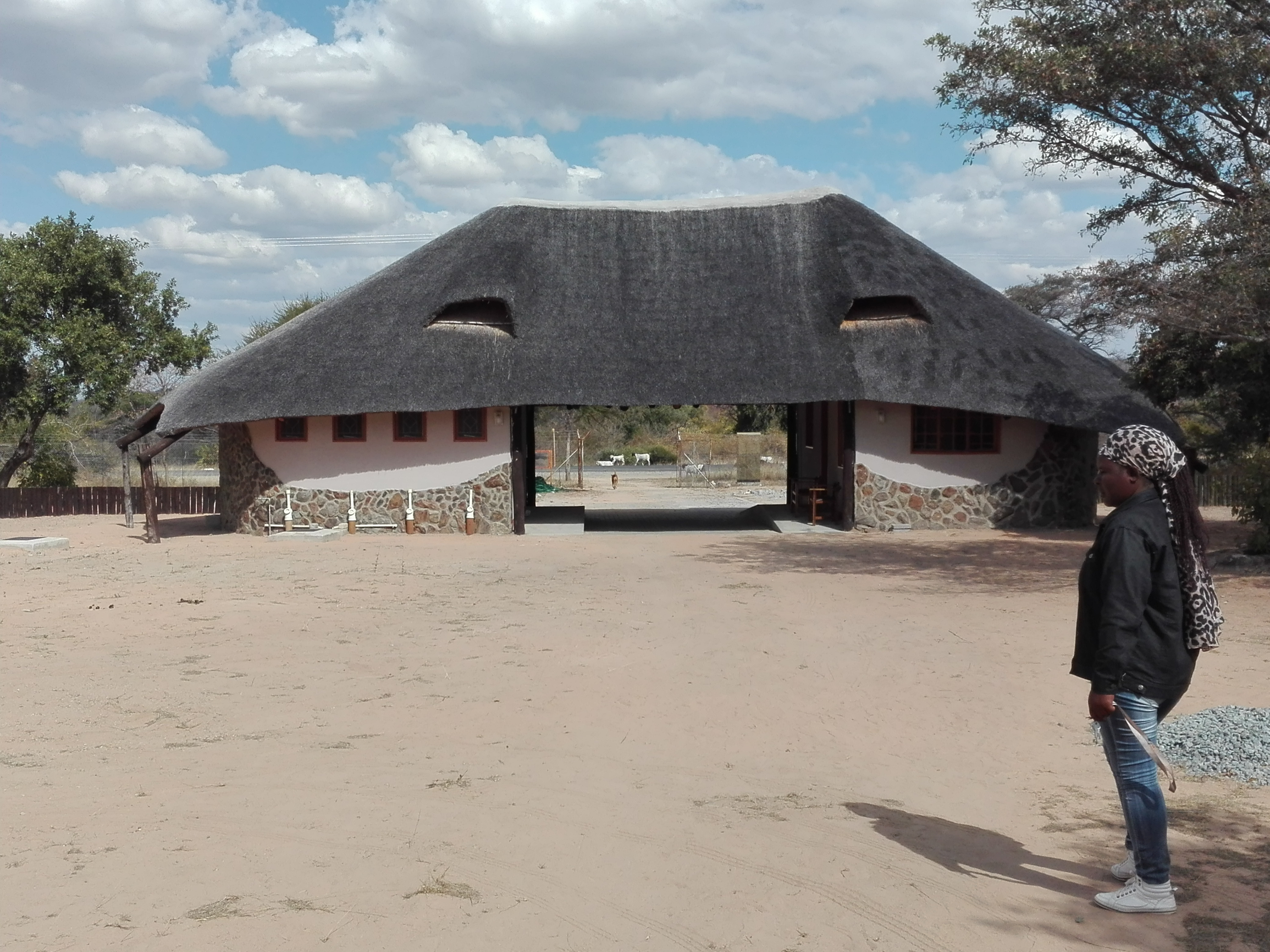
entrance of Domboshaba Monument(Gate house)

== The chief's residence ==
The dry-stone walling is a building method by which structures are constructed from stones without any mortar to bind them together. The hilltop was the residence of the chief, his religious advisor and closer attendants. The hilltop has six stone wall enclosures while the lower part has one main enclosure divided into several enclosures where the chief's wives and family lived.

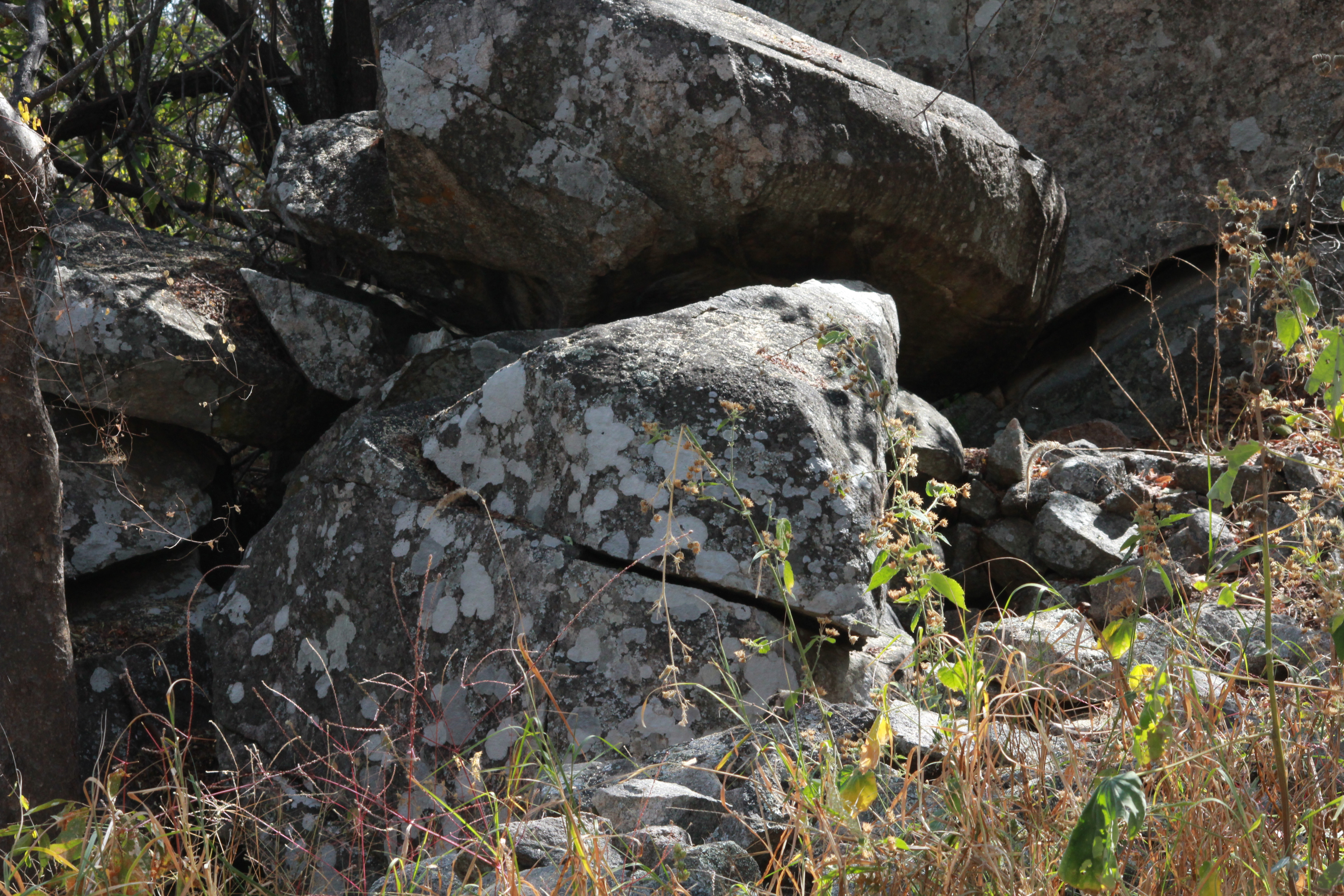
Domboshaba stone walls

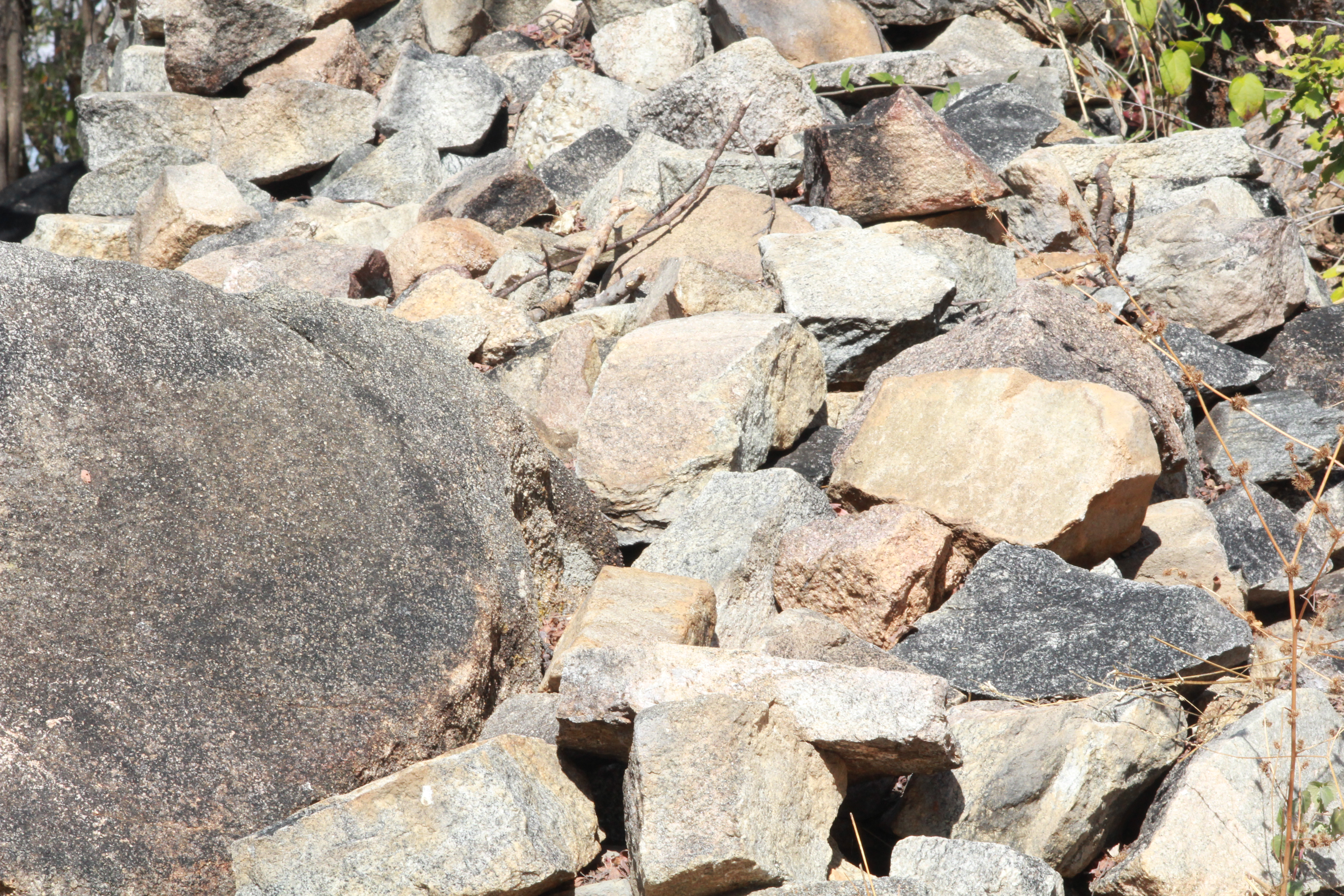
Domboshaba Stones

== Domboshaba cultural festival ==
Domboshaba Cultural festival started in 2000 when Mukani Action Campaign (MAC) and the Balumbidzi be iKalanga (The Society for the Promotion of iKalanga Language (SPIL) embarked on a search for ways to promote and celebrate the culture and history of the Kalanga people. Domboshaba monument hosts an annual festival event at the heritage site every year. The event comprises distinguished guests from different backgrounds to come and witness the culture and tradition of Kalanga people. This event is respected and sponsored by the Botswana tourism organisation to openly create awareness about the event and the monument site, this will also be the time to share Kalanga tradition experience and have a taste of the different traditional foods ranging from Delele, Nyembah, Thopi, Morogo wa dinawa, Zengwe, Lebelebele and others. Domboshaba cultural festival does not only attract the audience from the Botswana and Zimbabwe, rather the events done there exposes the culture of Kalanga people.

cultural festival

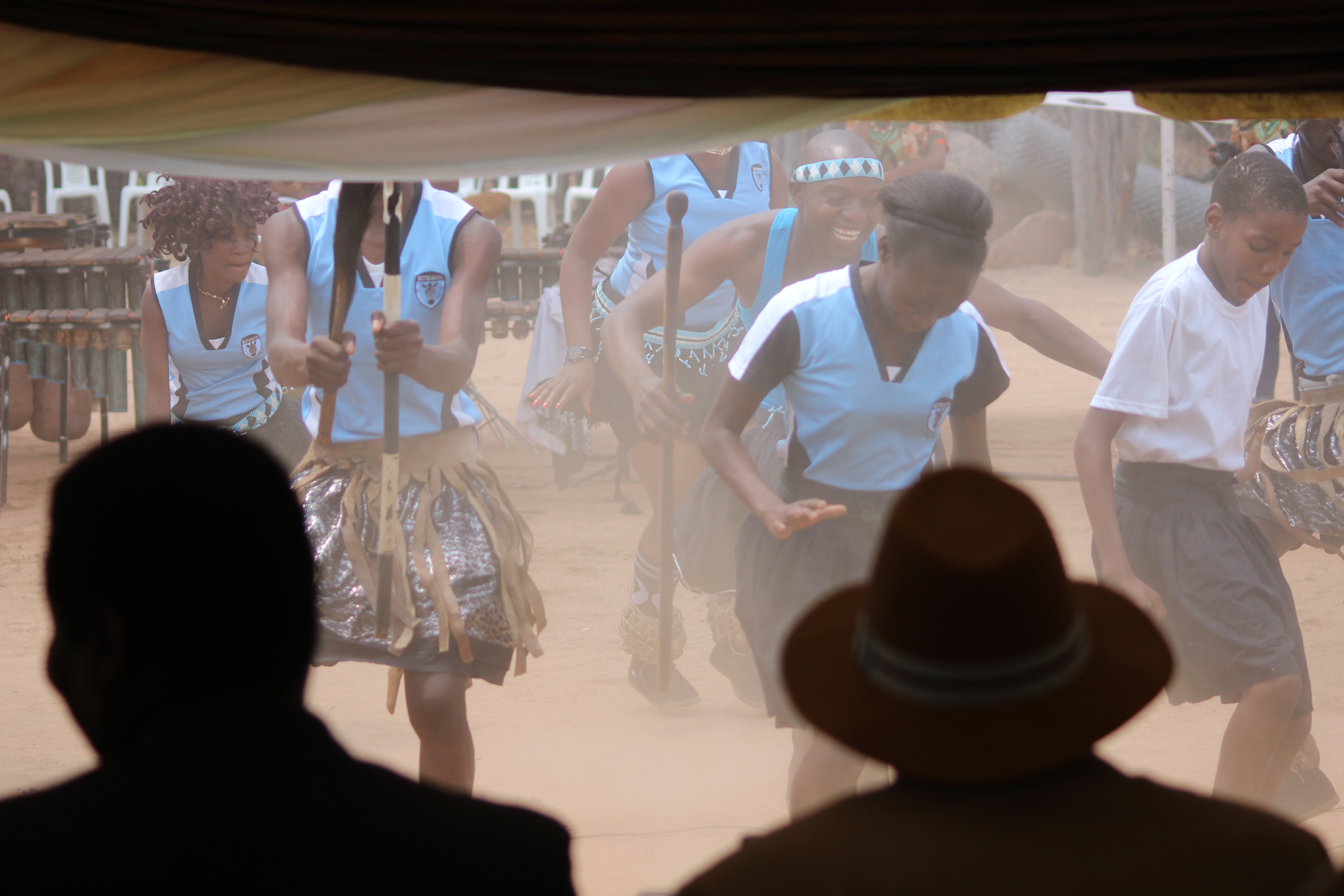
Dihosana dance troupe at the Domboshaba cultural festival 2017

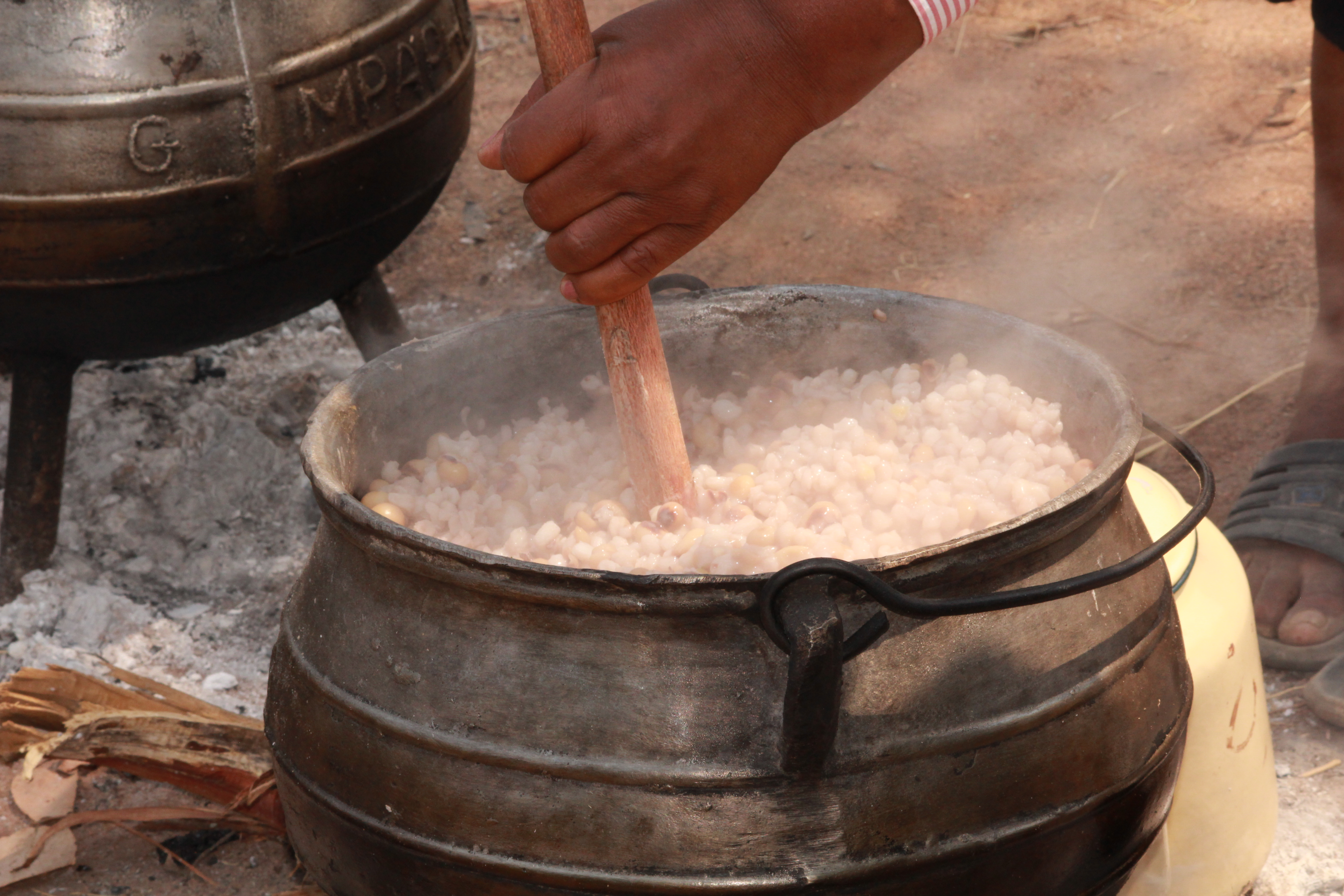
Chimone Kalanga meal

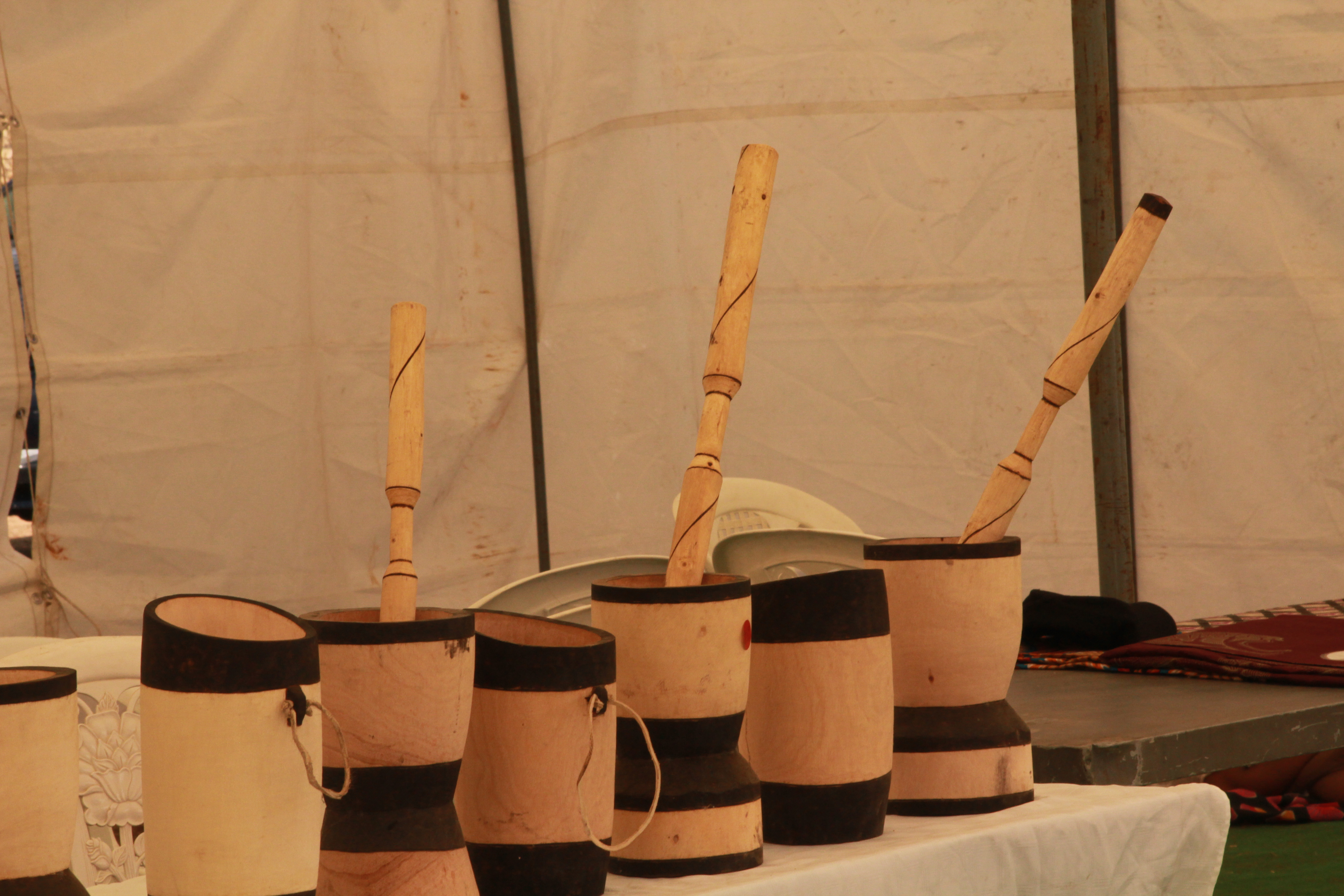
Artefacts_displayed_at_Domboshaba_cultural_festival_2017

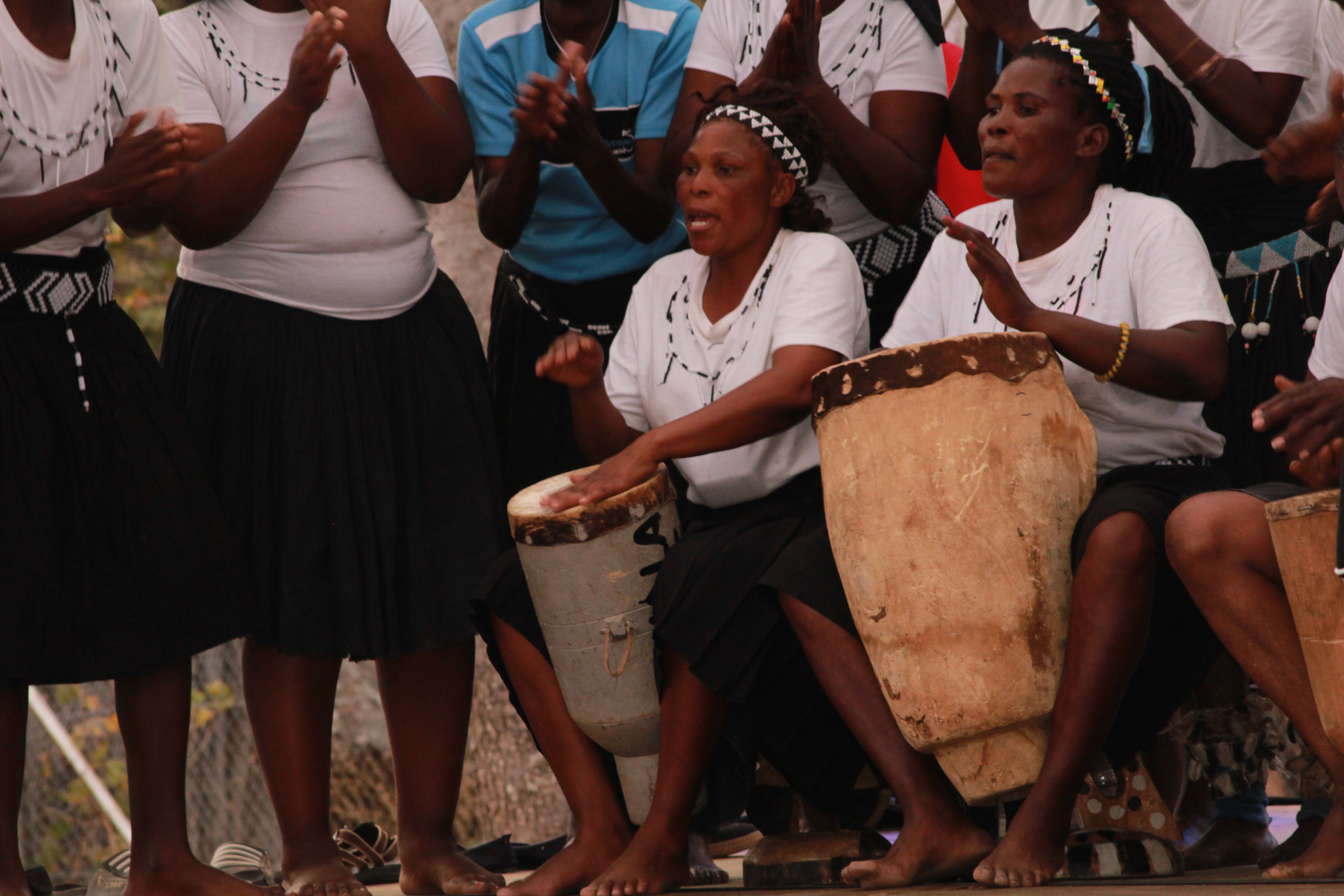
Dihosana_Dance_troupe_7 during the cultural festival in 2017

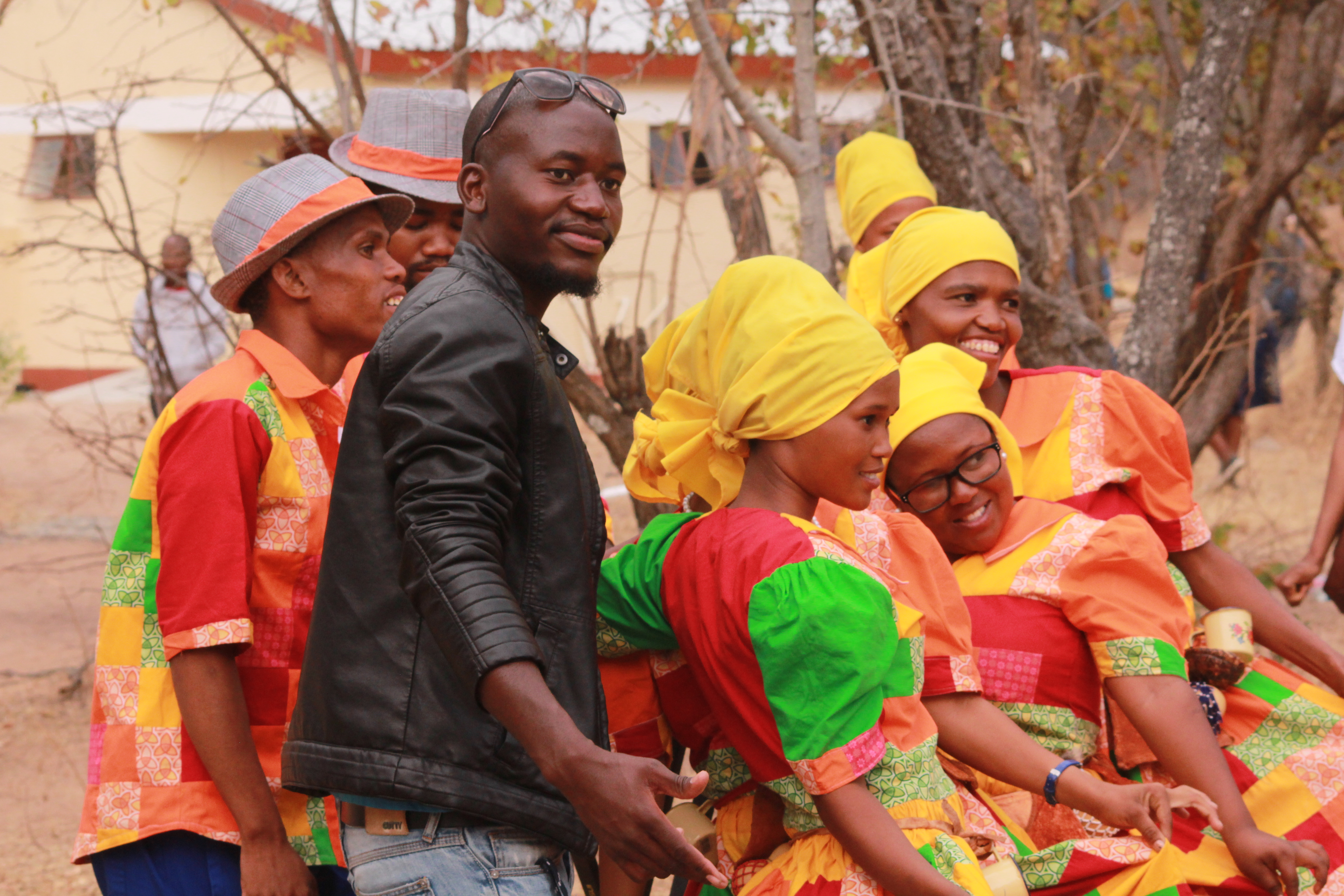
Folk_dance_troupe during the cultural festival 2017

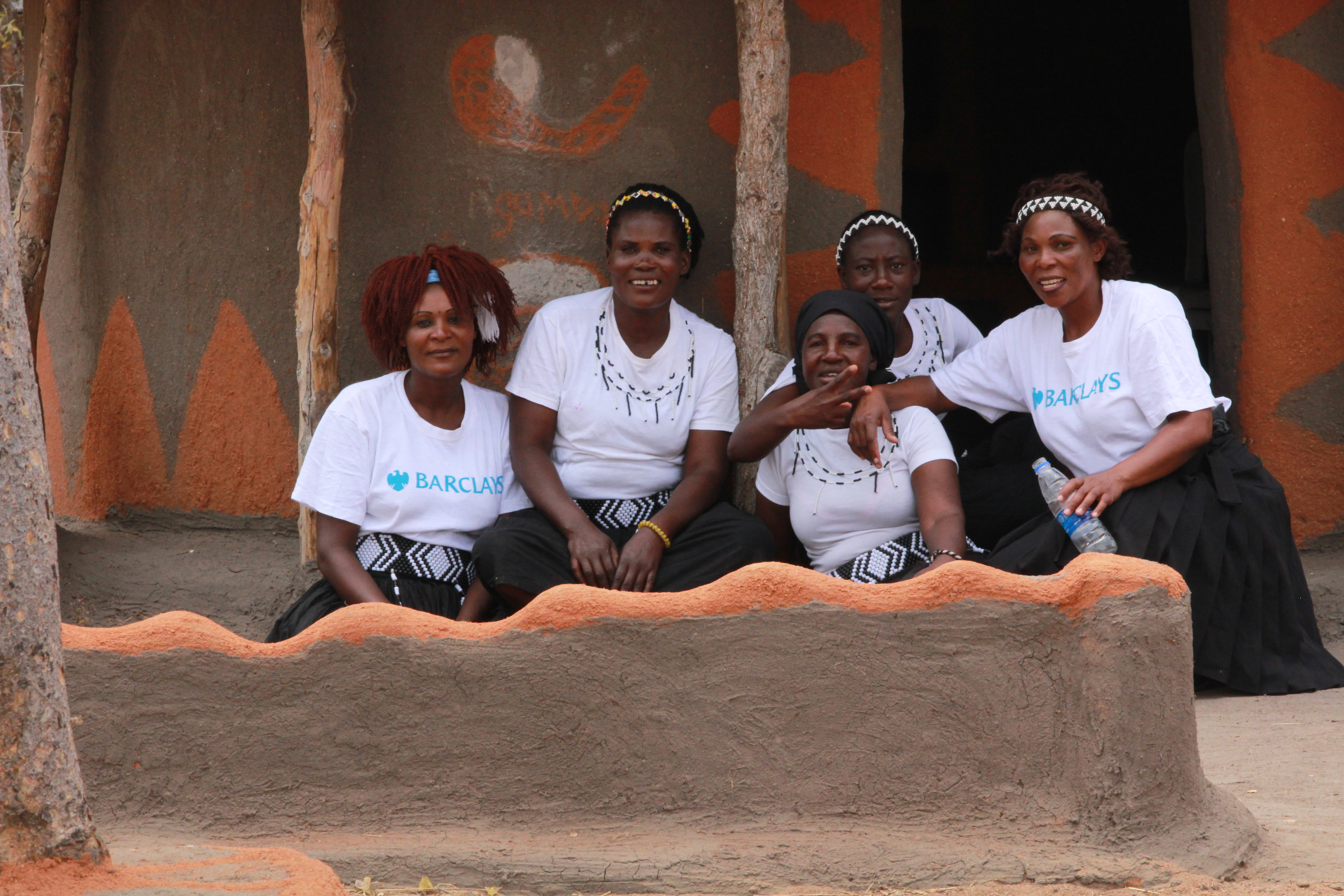
Hosanas_in_front_of_a_thatched_traditional_house_at_Domboshaba_cultural_festival

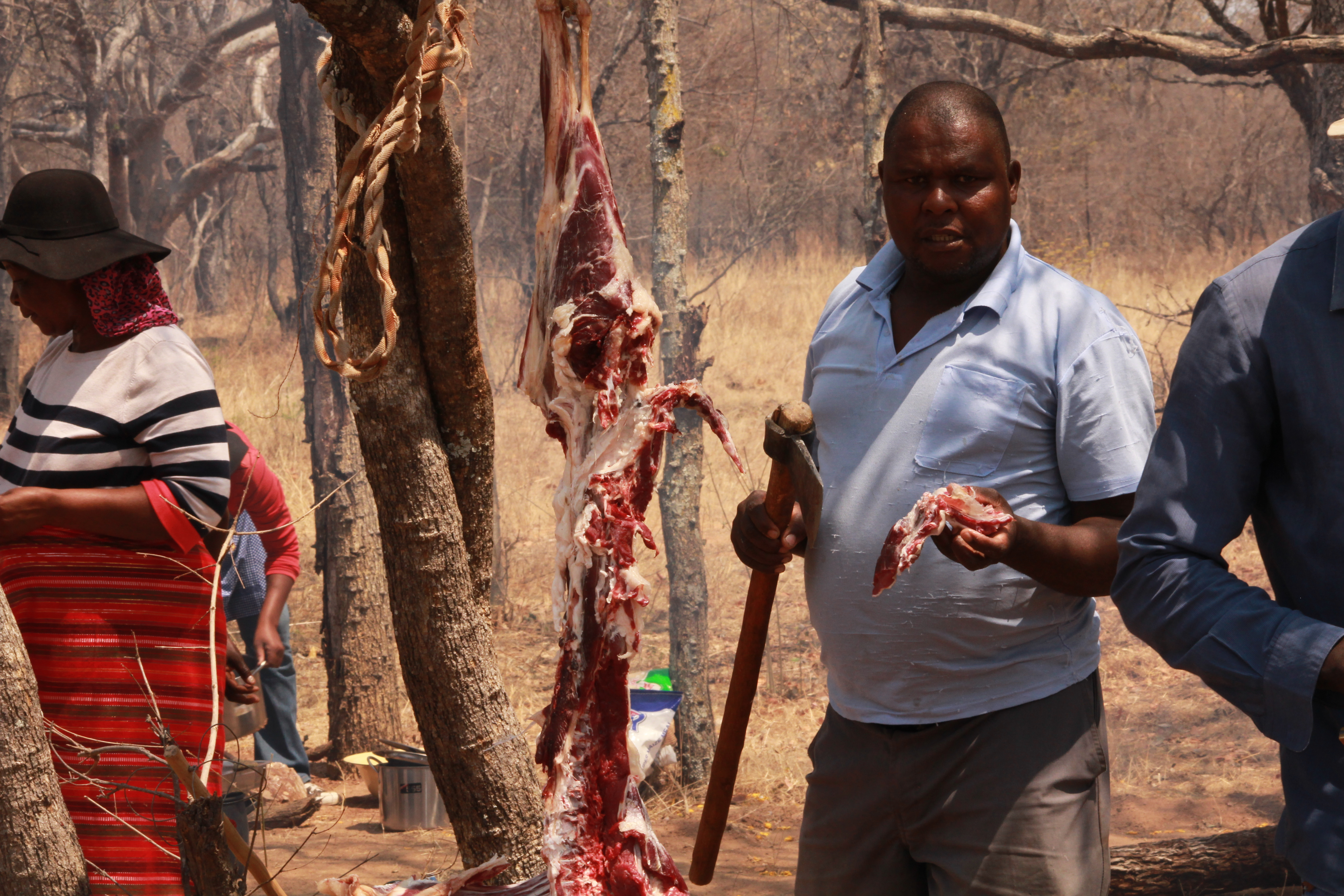
Kalanga_man_axing_goat_meat_at_the_Domboshaba_cultural_festival_2017

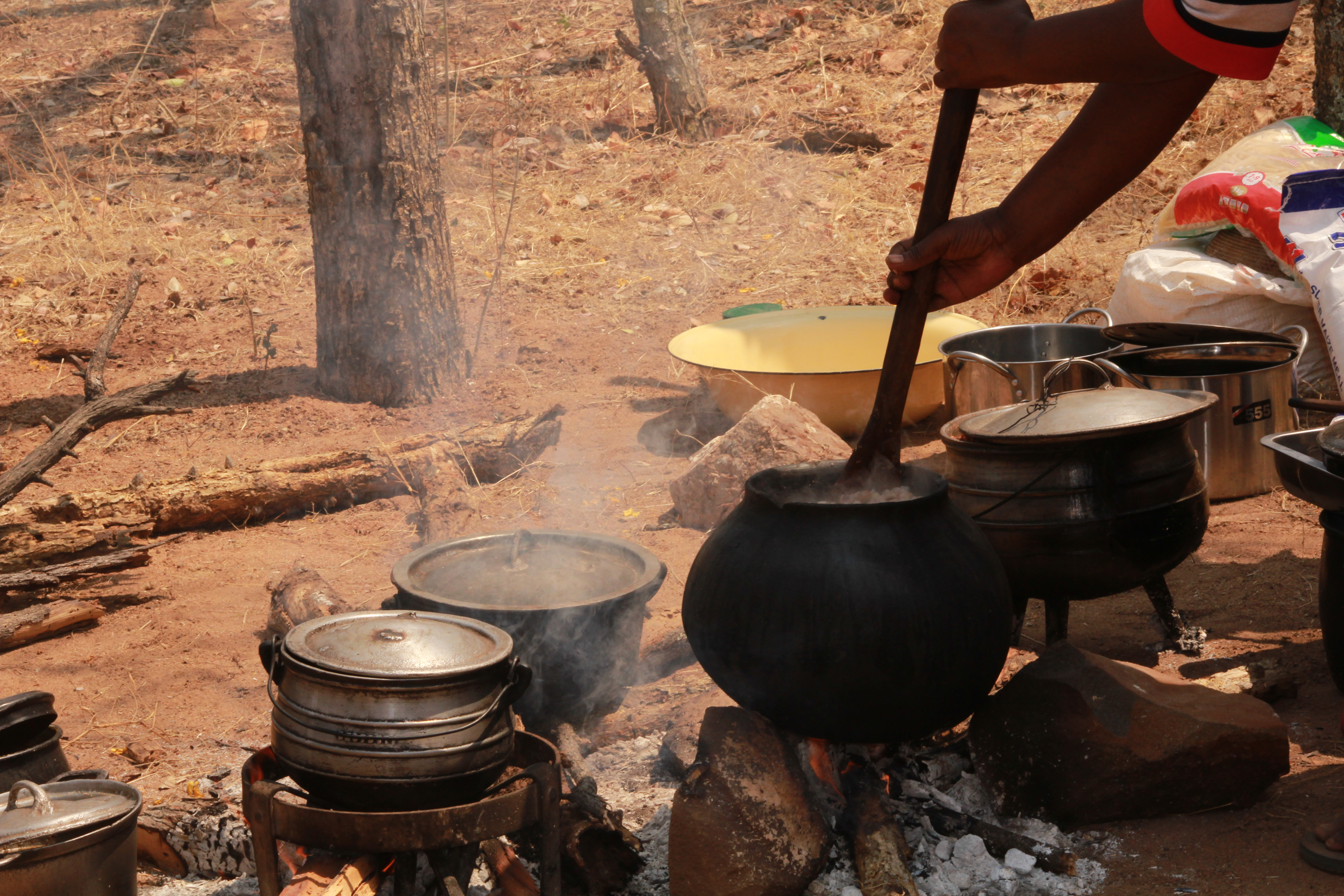
Kalanga_woman_steering_chimonye_meal_(Kalanga)_at_Domboshaba_cultural_festival

=== Festival schedule ===
Domboshaba festival is scheduled to take place usually at the end of September, sometimes running into October.

=== Domboshaba cultural trust ===
Domboshaba cultural trust or DTC is one of the sponsors of Domboshaba cultural festival and since its formation in the year 2007 it has become an annual event to bring together youth from Kalanga tradition and other groups to learn about the culture and tradition of Kalanga people.
