= Chief (magazine) =

Chief Magazine
- Publisher: Andy P. Smith
- Categories: Arts & Culture Magazine
- Frequency: Monthly
- Circulation: 50,000 unique daily visitors
- First issue: September 11, 2006
- Final issue: 2009
- Company: Chief Creative, LLC
- Country: US
- Based in: New York City
- Language: English
- Website: www.chiefmag.com

Chief Magazine was a free, monthly online arts and culture magazine based in Brooklyn. The magazine consisted primarily of interviews with underground musicians, artists and writers. Chief hosted parties and events, operating a music venue, Chief Bodega, and a record label, Chief Records.

Chief Magazine, under Andy P. Smith's direction, published content and hosted events from 2006 through 2009.

== History ==
Chief Magazine was founded by Andy P. Smith on September 11, 2006.

For the second issue, Smith partnered with Ed Zipco to run the project. Zipco and Smith originally became friends while attending the Pratt Institute of Art and Design. Smith went on to work for COLORS Magazine while Zipco went to work for Vice, until the two decided to launch their own independent magazine in 2006. Jacqueline Lewis, former writer of Gawker's now defunct "Bloghorrea NYC" column, became managing editor of chief in 2007.

In 2009, Zipco, Lewis and Smith ended Chief Magazine and went on to work on other projects.

== Content ==
Chief interviewed George Saunders, Paper Rad, The Death Set, Brad Neely, Eugene Mirman, MGMT, Matt and Kim, Wham City, Man Man and Japanther.

Chief also has a continuing series called PenPals, which consists of celebrity photographs as well as their post addresses.

== Chief Bodega ==
Chief Bodega, an underground music venue in Brooklyn, New York opened in the spring of 2008 in a two-level former grocery store (also known as "bodegas" in NYC)

Bodega hosted shows and parties with Japanther, The Death Set, Ninjasonik, Danger, DJ Dirty Finger, Smarts, Hidden Power, The Hood Gang, and dozens of other local and touring acts.

In October 2008, The Chief Bodega hosted a secret Street Fighter IV release party for Capcom.

In 2009, Bodega closed down indefinitely.

== Chief records ==
Chief Records (2007-2009) released albums and singles from artists including Ninjasonik, DJ Dirty Finger and Andersonic.
