= Super Chief (disambiguation) =

Super Chief may refer to:

== Transportation ==
- Super Chief, a Santa Fe Railway named passenger train
- Ford F-250 Super Chief concept truck
- The Aeronca 11CC "Super Chief" light aircraft.
- Super Chief, a model variant in the Pontiac Chieftain line of automobiles

== Characters ==
- Super-Chief, a DC Comics character
- Cartoon character from The Funny Company

== Media ==
- Super Chief, a Count Basie compilation LP
- Super Chief: The Life and Legacy of Earl Warren, a 1989 documentary film
- The Super Chief: Music For The Silver Screen, an album by Van Dyke Parks
- Superchief (film), a documentary film directed by Nick Kurzon

== Other ==
- Nickname for former Major League Baseball pitcher Allie Reynolds
- A three-star bureau chief in the New York Police Department
