= Chieftain (disambiguation) =

A chieftain is a tribal chief or village head.

Chieftain or Chieftains may refer also to:

- Clan chieftan, a position subordinate to Chief of a Scottish clan
- Chieftain (tank), the main battle tank of the British Army during the 1960s and 1970s
- The Chieftain, a 1894 comic opera by Arthur Sullivan and F. C. Burnand.
- The Chieftain (film), a 1984 Norwegian drama film
- Chieftains Museum, Cherokee museum in Rome, Georgia
- The Chieftains, a traditional Irish musical group
- MV Chieftain, a UK passenger ferry
- Chieftain Products, a former Canadian toy and game company
- Chieftain, a line of computers sold by Smoke Signal Broadcasting
- Nicholas Moran, a historian of armored fighting vehicles, also known as The Chieftain
- Pontiac Chieftain, a car

== See also ==
- Piper PA-31 Navajo Chieftain, a light aircraft
- Chief (disambiguation)
