= 2009–10 AAHL season =

The 2009-10 All American Hockey League season was the second season of the All American Hockey League. Seven teams participated in the regular season, and the Evansville IceMen were the league champions.

== Regular season ==
	GP	W	L	OTL	SOL	GF	GA	Pts
Chi-Town Shooters	46	30	11	3	2	225	175	65
Battle Creek Revolution	46	22	18	3	2	238	233	50
Evansville IceMen	46	20	23	0	3	167	187	43
West Michigan Blizzard	30	16	10	2	1	161	152	36
Madison Ice Muskies	24	12	9	1	2	106	118	27
Chicago Blaze	14	9	4	0	1	69	63	19
Detroit Hitmen	14	0	12	0	2	45	83	2

== Playoffs ==
Semifinals
0	Madison Ice Muskies
0	Battle Creek Revolution
Chi-Town Shooters	bye
2

Final
3	Evansville IceMen
4	West Michigan Blizzard
