= 2010–11 AAHL season =

The 2010–11 All American Hockey League season was the third season of the All American Hockey League. Six teams participated in the regular season, and the Battle Creek Revolution were the league champions.

== Regular season ==
	GP	W	L	OTL	SOL	GF	GA	Pts
Battle Creek Revolution	24	20	4	0	0	152	69	40
Lapeer Loggers/Michigan Moose	21	10	10	1	0	81	106	21
Troy Bruins	17	8	6	3	0	72	69	19
Indiana Blizzard/Chi-Town Shooters	18	6	11	1	0	68	98	13
Queen City Storm	17	5	10	1	1	54	83	12
Wooster Korn Kings	5	2	3	0	0	22	24	4

== Semifinal ==
Michigan Moose	0:2	Wooster Korn Kings

== Final ==
Battle Creek Revolution	4:2	Chi-Town Shooters
