= 2008–09 AAHA season =

All-American Hockey Association season

The 2008-09 All-American Hockey Association season was the first season of the All-American Hockey Association. Five teams participated in the regular season, and the Chi-Town Shooters were the league champions. The Detroit Dragons folded mid-season.

== Regular season ==
	GP	W	L	OTL	SOL	GF	GA	Pts
Chi-Town Shooters	41	30	11	0	0	226	158	60
Battle Creek Revolution	42	26	13	2	1	218	140	55
Evansville IceMen	42	16	26	0	0	177	242	32
Detroit Dragons	30	11	19	0	0	98	89	22
Chicago Blaze	12	1	11	0	0	36	126	2

== Playoffs ==
Semifinals
1	Chi-Town Shooters	2
5	Chicago Blaze	0
2	Battle Creek Revolution	2
3	Evansville IceMen	0

Final
1	Chi-Town Shooters	3
2	Battle Creek Revolution	2
