= Jason Simon (ice hockey) =

Canadian ice hockey player (born 1969)

- Born: March 21, 1969 (age 56) Sarnia, Ontario, Canada
- Height: 6 ft 0.1 in (183 cm)
- Weight: 225 lb (102 kg; 16 st 1 lb)
- Position: Defenceman
- Shot: Left
- Played for: Arizona Coyotes; New York Islanders
- NHL draft: 215th overall, 1989; New Jersey Devils
- Playing career: 1989–2009

Jason Simon (born March 21, 1969) is a Canadian former professional ice hockey player. Simon, who is from the Aamjiwnaang First Nation near Sarnia, Ontario, played five games in the National Hockey League for the Phoenix Coyotes and New York Islanders between 1994 and 1996. The rest of his career, which lasted from 1989 to 2009, was spent in various minor leagues.

== Career ==
Simon was recalled by the New York Islanders on January 6, 1994 and made his NHL debut with the New York Islanders on January 7, 1994. He shared his debut with forwards Dan Plante, Ziggy Palffy, and goaltender Jamie McLennan. Missing from Simon's debut and tenure with the team was Islanders' coach Al Arbour, who was serving a five-game suspension due to Islanders' forward Mick Vukota leaving the bench and participating in an on-ice brawl that occurred during the Islanders' previous game played on January 4, 1994.

The following season, Simon signed with the Winnipeg Jets and played several exhibition games with the team. Simon was involved in a kneeing incident on September 18, 1995, where he was kneed by Bryan Marchment. Marchment later received a five-game suspension without pay due to the incident.

In addition to his four-game tenure with the Islanders, Simon was later recalled to the NHL one more time. He was recalled by the Phoenix Coyotes on October 30, 1997, playing one game with the team before being returned to Las Vegas the following day.

The following season, Simon was signed by the Colorado Avalanche on August 20, 1997 and briefly attended their training camp. While in training camp, Simon fought enforcer Wade Belak and Wade's brother Graham Belak.

Simon eventually played for thirty-one teams in his twenty-year career before retiring from hockey in 2009.

== Career statistics ==
=== Regular season and playoffs ===
			Regular season					Playoffs
Season	Team	League	GP	G	A	Pts	PIM	GP	G	A	Pts	PIM
1986–87	London Knights	OHL	33	1	2	3	33	—	—	—	—	—
1986–87	Sudbury Wolves	OHL	26	2	3	5	50	—	—	—	—	—
1987–88	Sudbury Wolves	OHL	26	5	7	12	35	—	—	—	—	—
1987–88	Hamilton Steelhawks	OHL	29	5	13	18	124	11	0	2	2	15
1988–89	Kingston Raiders	OHL	17	7	12	19	58	—	—	—	—	—
1988–89	Windsor Spitfires	OHL	45	16	27	43	135	4	1	4	5	13
1989–90	Utica Devils	AHL	16	3	4	7	28	2	0	0	0	12
1989–90	Nashville Knights	ECHL	13	4	3	7	81	5	1	3	4	17
1990–91	Utica Devils	AHL	50	2	12	14	189	—	—	—	—	—
1990–91	Johnstown Chiefs	ECHL	22	11	9	20	55	—	—	—	—	—
1991–92	Utica Devils	AHL	1	0	0	0	12	—	—	—	—	—
1991–92	San Diego Gulls	IHL	13	1	4	5	45	3	0	1	1	9
1992–93	Flint Bulldogs	CoHL	44	17	32	49	202	—	—	—	—	—
1992–93	Detroit Falcons	CoHL	11	7	13	20	38	6	1	2	3	40
1993–94	New York Islanders	NHL	4	0	0	0	34	—	—	—	—	—
1993–94	Salt Lake Golden Eagles	IHL	50	7	7	14	323	—	—	—	—	—
1993–94	Detroit Falcons	CoHL	13	9	16	25	87	—	—	—	—	—
1994–95	Denver Grizzlies	IHL	61	3	6	9	300	1	0	0	0	12
1995–96	Springfield Falcons	AHL	18	2	2	4	90	7	1	0	1	26
1996–97	Phoenix Coyotes	NHL	1	0	0	0	0	—	—	—	—	—
1996–97	Las Vegas Thunder	IHL	64	4	3	7	402	3	1	1	2	17
1997–98	Hershey Bears	AHL	26	0	1	1	170	—	—	—	—	—
1997–98	Quebec Rafales	IHL	30	6	3	9	127	—	—	—	—	—
1998–99	Colorado Gold Kings	WCHL	60	16	23	39	419	3	1	1	2	17
1999–00	Port Huron Border Cats	UHL	45	21	22	43	118	—	—	—	—	—
1999–00	Louisville Panthers	AHL	11	1	0	1	28	—	—	—	—	—
2000–01	Memphis RiverKings	CHL	61	24	19	43	301	5	3	1	4	19
2001–02	LaSalle Rapides	QSPHL	9	3	4	7	60	—	—	—	—	—
2001–02	Anchorage Aces	WCHL	11	1	3	4	41	4	0	3	3	8
2002–03	Port Huron Beacons	UHL	27	4	2	6	79	—	—	—	—	—
2004–05	Sherbrooke Saint-Francois	LNAH	9	0	2	2	33	—	—	—	—	—
2004–05	Huntsville Havoc	SPHL	12	4	5	9	27	1	0	0	0	0
2005–06	Jacksonville Barracudas	SPHL	42	15	16	31	128	—	—	—	—	—
2006–07	Brantford Blast	MLH	4	1	0	1	12	—	—	—	—	—
2007–08	Brantford Blast	MLH	29	6	18	24	46	9	2	2	4	4
2008–09	Detroit Dragons	AAHL	12	5	8	13	22	—	—	—	—	—
AHL totals			122	8	19	27	517	9	1	0	1	38
NHL totals			5	0	0	0	34	—	—	—	—	—

== Awards and accomplishments ==
- 1995: Turner Cup champion (Denver Grizzlies)
- 2008: Allan Cup champion (Brantford Blast)
