= Big Boy Arena =

Ice rink in Fraser, Michigan, U.S.

Coordinates: 42.548571°N 82.9563°W

- Location within Michigan Location within the United States
- Former names: Fraser Hockeyland (2013-2021); Great Lakes Sports City (2001-2013)
- Address: 34400 Utica Rd
- Location: Fraser, Michigan
- Capacity: 8,000
- Surface: Ice

Tenants
- Detroit Lightining (CEHL) (2001–2004); Motor City Mechanics (UHL) (2004–2006); Detroit Dragons (AAHL) (2008–2009); Detroit Hitmen (AAHL) (2009); Metro Jets (NA3HL/USPHL) (2015–2021); Motor City Rockers (FPHL) (2022-2025)

Website
- www.bigboyarena.com

Big Boy Arena (formerly Fraser Hockeyland and Great Lakes Sports City) in Fraser, Michigan, is a 20,000-square-foot (1,900 m^{2}) ice center and entertainment venue offering five rinks for hockey, figure skating, inline skating, camps, clinics, private lessons, leagues, and special events. Its largest ice rink is a stadium arena with a 3,400-seat capacity. The ice center was the home of the Motor City Mechanics of the former United Hockey League. It was also home to the Metro Jets junior and youth hockey organization from 2015 to 2021. The complex was the host of the 2007 USA Hockey National Championships for the Midget division.

When the complex was known as Great Lakes Sports City, their five rinks were all named after one of the Great Lakes. On August 1, 2013, the complex changed its name to Fraser Hockeyland and a partnership with the Coca-Cola Company resulted in the five rinks changing names. Michigan became Coca-Cola Arena, Huron became Dasani Arena, Ontario became Sprite Arena, Erie became Powerade Arena, and Superior became Monster Arena.

In July 2020, it was announced the Motor City Rockers, a minor professional team in the Federal Prospects Hockey League, was to play out of Fraser Hockeyland beginning with the 2020–21 season. However, due to the ongoing restrictions during the COVID-19 pandemic, the Rockers withdrew before the season began and were later removed from the league's team directory. However, the Rockers came back with new ownership for the 2022–2023 season and called the Big Boy Arena home until suspending operations following the 2024-25 season.

Big Boy Arena is also the home to B & R Sports Pro Shop, Michigan Athletic Training (MAT) facility, the Fraser Figure Skating Club, as well as Michigan Sports Enterprises adult hockey. Michigan high school teams including Chippewa Valley, Regina, Grosse Pointe North, and Grosse Pointe South call Big Boy Arena their home rink.
