= Evansville IceMen (2008–2010) =

- City: Evansville, Indiana, U.S.
- League: All American Hockey League
- Operated: 2008–2010
- Home arena: Swonder Ice Arena
- Colors: Black & Blue

Franchise history
- 2008–2010: Evansville IceMen (AAHL)
- 2008: Evansville IceMen (MWHL)

Championships
- Regular season titles: 0
- Playoff championships: 1 (2010 AAHL)

The Evansville IceMen were a professional hockey team based in Evansville, Indiana. The team folded in 2010, as IceMen owner Ron Geary purchased the Muskegon Lumberjacks (1992–2010) of the International Hockey League and moved the team to Evansville, taking on the name "Evansville IceMen".

The AAHL IceMen played their home games at Swonder Ice Arena in Evansville.

== History ==
The IceMen were one of the four founding members of the All American Hockey League. The IceMen were scheduled to play in the inaugural 2008–2009 season of the Midwest Hockey League. However, the league folded prior to the start of the season. The IceMen, along with the Motor City Gamblers (later the Detroit Dragons), left the fledgling league to join two other financially sound teams from the recently folded Mid-Atlantic Hockey League. The result, was the formation of the All American Hockey League, which is a lower level professional minor league affiliated with the International Hockey League.

On February 14, 2009, The IceMen set an AAHL scoring record in a 24–4 win over the Chicago Blaze. Also on February 14, 2009, Evansville goalie Kira Hurley's third period assist made her the first female goaltender to earn a point in a men's professional hockey game. In recognition of her historic accomplishment, Hurley's game-worn jersey and game-used stick are immortalized in the Hockey Hall of Fame in Toronto.

On August 15, 2009, the IceMen unveiled their new logo, replacing the previous logo's polar bear.

On April 15, 2010, the IceMen defeated the West Michigan Blizzard 4 - 3, closing the championship series 4 -1 to win the 2010 AAHL Rod Davidson Cup.

On June 22, 2010, the IceMen disbanded after the announcement that the IceMen owner purchased the rights to the Muskegon Lumberjacks franchise, from the IHL to take on the same name.

== Seasons ==
Season	GP	W	L	OTL	Pts	GF	GA	Final Standing	Playoff Result
2008–2009	42	16	26	0	32	177	242	3rd, AAHL	Lost in 1st Round
2009–2010	46	20	23	3	51	167	187	3rd, AAHL	Rod Davidson Cup Champions
Totals	88	36	49	3	83	344	429	—	

== See also ==
- Sports in Evansville
