= Mountain West Hockey League =

Senior ice hockey league

Mountain Hockey League
- Mountain Hockey League
- Formerly: Mountain West Hockey League
- Sport: Ice hockey
- Founded: 2012
- First season: 2012–13
- Commissioner: Thomas Brown
- No. of teams: 9
- Country: United States
- Most recent champions: NorCal Ice Raiders (2019)
- Most titles: San Diego Skates; Vail Yeti; NorCal Ice Raiders (2 each)
- Website: www.mountainhockeyleague.co

The Mountain Hockey League (MHL) is a Senior ice hockey league consisting of teams from the Western United States.

== History ==
The MWHL was founded in Las Vegas, Nevada by Thomas Brown in 2012. It is a Senior A ice hockey league with clubs spanning the western United States. MWHL clubs are composed of North American and European players with junior, college, and professional experience. The MWHL features two geographic divisions: Sierra and Rocky.

The MWHL regular season runs from November through March. The club with the best record at the end of the regular season is awarded the Commissioner's Cup. The MWHL Cup Playoffs are held in April, culminating in the MWHL Cup Finals. The winner of the MWHL Cup Finals is awarded the MWHL Cup. The league also sponsors the MWHL Classic, a mid-season inter-division game held at a neutral location.

The Park City Pioneers were the first league champion in 2013 defeating the Las Vegas Hookers in the final.

The San Diego Skates became the first repeat champion winning the league championship in 2015 and again in 2016.

== Media ==
The MWHL Network provides news, scores, stats, and features about the league and its clubs via the league website and associated club websites. The MWHL Network also provides live webcast coverage of select games during the regular season and playoffs on its YouTube channel.

== Teams ==
Team	City	Arena	Joined MWHL
Breckenridge Vipers	Breckenridge, Colorado	Stephen C. West Ice Arena	2015
Mansfield Barracudas	Mansfield, Texas	Children's Health StarCenter Mansfield	2019
Vegas Jesters	Summerlin, Nevada	City National Arena	2012
Reno Ice Raiders	Reno, Nevada	Reno Ice	2015
San Diego Super Hornets	San Diego, California	UTC Ice	2023
Santa Rosa Growlers	Santa Rosa, California	Snoopy's Home Ice	2019
Stockton Stampede	Stockton, California	Oak Park Arena	2020
Texas Titans	Dallas, Texas	StarCenter Frisco	2018
Utah County Blizzard	Provo, Utah	Peaks Ice Arena	2016

=== Former teams ===
- Arizona Outlaws (2015-19)
- Aspen Leafs (2012-14)
- Breckenridge Brewers (2014-15)
- Boulder Bison (2015-16)
- Jackson Hole Moose (2012-14)
- Las Vegas Hookers (2012-13) - renamed Wolves, Cavalry, Jesters
- McCall Buccaneers (2012-13)
- North County Checkers (2017-19)
- Orange County Checkers (2014-17) - moved and renamed North County Checkers
- Park City Pioneers (2012-15)
- Pikes Peak Vigilantes (2015-19)
- Salt Lake City Ice Wolves (2013-15) - sold and relocated to Oakland; renamed Ice Raiders.
- Salt Lake City Rebels/Golden Eagles (2012-14)
- Sun Valley Suns (2013-14)
- Utah Buccaneers (2015-16)
- Vail Yeti (2013-19)
- West Coast Seals (2017-19)

== Champions ==
Season	Commissioners' Cup (regular season)	MWHL Cup (playoff champion)	Playoff Runner-up	Result
2012-13	Las Vegas Hookers	Park City Pioneers	Las Vegas Hookers	
2013-14	Vail Yeti	Vail Yeti	Las Vegas Wolves	7-4
2014-15	San Diego Skates	San Diego Skates		
2015-16	Breckenridge Vipers	San Diego Skates	Breckenridge Vipers	2-1 (best-of 3)
2016-17	NorCal Ice Raiders	Vail Yeti	Arizona Outlaws	2-0 (best-of 3)
2017-18	San Diego Skates	NorCal Ice Raiders	Vail Yeti	2-1 (best-of 3)
2018-19	NorCal Ice Raiders	NorCal Ice Raiders	Breckenridge Vipers	2-0 (best-of 3)
2019-20	none	none	---	---

== Notable alumni ==
- Zach Pochiro, Las Vegas Hookers - Bakersfield Condors (AHL) Allen Americans (ECHL)
- Mark Adamek, Park City Pioneers - Utah Grizzlies (ECHL)
- Zack Hale, Park City Pioneers - Watertown Privateers (FHL)
- Jeff Hazelwood, Las Vegas Hookers - Las Vegas Wranglers (ECHL)
- Ben Wilner, Park City Pioneers - Las Vegas Wranglers (ECHL)
- Brian Jacque, Las Vegas Hookers - Chi-Town Shooters (AAHL) Flint Generals (IHL)

== See also ==
- List of ice hockey leagues
- Federal Prospects Hockey League
- Southern Professional Hockey League
- Black Diamond Hockey League
- Great Lakes Hockey League
