= West Meadows Ice Arena =

Multi-purpose arena in Rolling Meadows

- Interactive map of West Meadows Ice Arena
- Location: Rolling Meadows, IL
- Coordinates: 42.09239°N 88.03095°W
- Operator: Rolling Meadows Park District
- Capacity: 1,000
- Surface: Ice

Tenants
- Chicago Blaze (AAHL) (2008–2009); Chicago Hitmen (NAHL/NA3HL) (2010–2011)

The West Meadows Ice Arena is a multi-purpose arena in Rolling Meadows, IL. It features ice for hockey, figure skating, and open skating.

The ice rink is owned and operated by the Rolling Meadows Park District. West Meadows is one of two ice rinks in Rolling Meadows.

The arena was home to the Chicago Hitmen a Jr. A ice hockey organization fielding teams in the Tier II Jr A North American Hockey League as well as the Tier III Jr A North American 3 Hockey League during the 2010-11 season before they moved to the Fox Valley Ice Arena.

The arena was also home to the Chicago Blaze of the All American Hockey League before the team folded on December 11, 2009.
