= Senior ice hockey =

Semi-professional or amateur competitive ice hockey for adults

Senior ice hockey refers to amateur or semi-professional ice hockey competition. There are no age restrictions for Senior players, who typically consist of those whose Junior eligibility has expired.

Most senior hockey leagues operate under the jurisdiction of Hockey Canada or USA Hockey. They are not affiliated in any way with professional hockey leagues. Many former professional players play Senior hockey after their pro careers are over. The top Senior teams in Canada (Senior AAA) compete annually for the Allan Cup.

== History ==
From the beginning of the 1900s until the 1970s, Senior hockey was immensely popular across Canada, particularly in rural towns. At a time when most households didn't have a television and few hockey games were broadcast, local arenas were filled to capacity to watch the local team take on a rival.

The popularity of Senior hockey declined in the 1980s and 1990s. A number of long-running leagues and teams vanished. Today, many players choose to play organized recreational hockey, sometimes referred to as "commercial hockey." The popularity of the National Hockey League and Junior hockey has also supplanted Senior hockey in many towns across Canada.

== Senior AAA hockey leagues ==
- Allan Cup Hockey (Ontario Sr. AAA)
- Chinook Hockey League (Alberta Sr. AAA)
- American Premier Hockey League (US Sr. AAA)
- Ligue de hockey Senior AAA du Québec (Quebec Sr. AAA)

== Other leagues ==
In Canada:

- Central Interior Hockey League
- North Peace Hockey League
- Highway Hockey League
- Big 6 Hockey League
- Qu'Appelle Valley Hockey League
- Carillon Senior Hockey League
- South Eastern Manitoba Hockey League
- Western Ontario Athletic Association Senior Hockey League
- Avalon East Senior Hockey League
- Central West Senior Hockey League
- Northern Premier Hockey League formerly Eastern Ontario Super Hockey League
- West Coast Senior Hockey League
- West Coast Senior Hockey League (British Columbia)
- Ontario Elite Hockey League OHA Sr. "AA"

In the United States:

- Union Hockey League
- Great Lakes Hockey League
- Mountain West Hockey League
- Black Diamond Hockey League
