= Lorne Knauft =

Canadian ice hockey player

- Born: July 7, 1968 (age 56); Hanna, Alberta, Canada
- Height: 6 ft 2 in (188 cm)
- Weight: 200 lb (91 kg; 14 st 4 lb)
- Position: Defence
- Shot: Left
- Played for: AHL; New Haven Senators; Portland Pirates; Rochester Americans; Adirondack Red Wings; CoHL/UHL; Thunder Bay Thunder Hawks; Flint Generals; Muskegon Fury; Brantford Smoke; WCHL; Anchorage Aces; IHL; Houston Aeros; Detroit Vipers
- NHL draft: Undrafted
- Playing career: 1992–2011

Lorne Knauft (born July 7, 1968) is a Canadian retired professional ice hockey defenceman. He is currently married to Tracy Brown Knauft and they became parents to Judd Knauft in 2008.

Knauft was the head coach for the Lapeer Loggers of the All American Hockey League during the 2010-11 season.

== Career statistics ==
			Regular season					Playoffs
Season	Team	League	GP	G	A	Pts	PIM	GP	G	A	Pts	PIM
1989–90	University of Alaska Anchorage	NCAA	19	2	8	10	—	—	—	—	—	—
1990–91	University of Alaska Anchorage	NCAA	41	4	15	19	69	—	—	—	—	—
1991–92	University of Alaska Anchorage	NCAA	35	6	13	19	72	—	—	—	—	—
1992–93	New Haven Senators	AHL	59	4	6	10	107	—	—	—	—	—
1992–93	Thunder Bay Thunder Hawks	CoHL	3	0	0	0	2	1	0	1	1	2
1993–94	Flint Generals	CoHL	51	20	36	56	180	6	0	5	5	47
1993–94	Portland Pirates	AHL	7	3	1	4	16	7	2	2	4	14
1994–95	Rochester Americans	AHL	5	0	2	2	8	—	—	—	—	—
1994–95	Adirondack Red Wings	AHL	2	0	1	1	6	—	—	—	—	—
1994–95	Muskegon Fury	CoHL	16	2	7	9	48	—	—	—	—	—
1994–95	Brantford Smoke	CoHL	29	12	19	31	80	—	—	—	—	—
1995–96	Anchorage Aces	WCHL	41	12	27	39	180	—	—	—	—	—
1996–97	Flint Generals	CoHL	67	19	40	59	144	14	2	7	9	37
1996–97	Houston Aeros	IHL	7	1	0	1	2	—	—	—	—	—
1997–98	Flint Generals	UHL	60	13	33	46	80	11	2	6	8	20
1998–99	Flint Generals	UHL	54	9	25	34	143	10	1	2	3	50
1999–00	Detroit Vipers	IHL	1	0	0	0	4	—	—	—	—	—
1999–00	Flint Generals	UHL	34	5	20	25	70	12	0	5	5	36
2000–01	Flint Generals	UHL	57	14	32	46	155	—	—	—	—	—
2001–02	Flint Generals	UHL	21	1	4	5	50	—	—	—	—	—
2007–08	Flint Generals	IHL	6	0	1	1	10	—	—	—	—	—
2010–11	Lapeer Loggers	AAHL	1	0	2	2	2	—	—	—	—	—
AHL totals			73	7	10	17	137	7	2	2	4	14
CoHL totals			166	53	102	155	454	21	2	13	15	86
UHL totals			226	42	114	156	498	33	3	13	16	106
