= Michigan Moose =

- City: Battle Creek, Michigan
- League: All American Hockey League
- Founded: 2011
- Home arena: Revolution Arena
- Colors: Red & White
- Head coach: Ron Davidson

Franchise history
- 2011: Michigan Moose (AAHL)

Championships
- Regular season titles: 0
- Playoff championships: 0

The Michigan Moose were a professional ice hockey team which played in the All American Hockey League for one month in 2011. The team played its home games at Revolution Arena in Battle Creek, Michigan which it shared with fellow AAHL team, Battle Creek Revolution. The Moose were created in January 2011 using players from three other AAHL teams (Lapeer Loggers, Queen City Storm, and Troy Bruins) which had all ceased operations mid-season. The Moose would also cease operations in February 2011.

== Season-by-season record ==
Season	GP	W	L	OTL	SOL	PTS	GF	GA	Standing	Playoff Result
2010-11	3	0	3	0	0	0	10	35	N/A	Did not participate
