= Lapeer Loggers =

- City: Lapeer, Michigan
- League: All American Hockey League
- Founded: 2010
- Home arena: Polar Palace Arena
- Colors: Red, black, and white
- Head coach: Lorne Knauft
- Affiliate: South Muskoka Shield (GMHL)

Franchise history
- 2010–2011: Lapeer Loggers

Championships
- Regular season titles: 0
- Playoff championships: 0

The Lapeer Loggers were a professional ice hockey team based in Lapeer, Michigan. The Loggers played the 2010–11 season as a member of the All American Hockey League and played their home games at Polar Palace Arena in Lapeer, MI.

== Team history ==
The Loggers were approved for membership in the AAHL in August 2010. On January 3, the AAHL took over the operations of the Lapeer Loggers and very soon thereafter, due to league wide difficulties, both the Queen City Storm and the Troy Bruins folded. The AAHL assimilated players from Lapeer, Queen City, and Troy, into the newly christened Michigan Moose. After just a few games, the AAHL called an early end to the regular season and played the AAHL's final playoffs (won by the Battle Creek Revolution) before disbanding the league.

== Affiliates ==
On September 14, 2010, the Lapeer Loggers announced that they had signed an affiliation agreement with the South Muskoka Shield of the Greater Metro Junior A Hockey League.

== Season-by-season record ==
Season	GP	W	L	OTL	SOL	PTS	GF	GA	Standing	Playoff Result
2010-11	18	10	7	1	0	21	71	71	N/A	Did not participate
