= Chicago Hitmen =

- City: Geneva, Illinois
- League: NAHL
- Division: Midwest
- Founded: 2010
- Home arena: Fox Valley Ice Arena
- Colors: Black, red and gray
- Owners: Mark Hammersmith & Dick Glass
- Affiliates: Chicago Hitmen

Franchise history
- 2010–2012: Chicago Hitmen

The Chicago Hitmen were a Junior A Tier II ice hockey team based out of the Chicago region.

== NAHL team history ==
The Chicago Hitmen played in the North American Hockey League from 2010 to 2012. The team first played in the 1,000-seat West Meadows Ice Arena in Rolling Meadows, Illinois. On June 4, 2010, the team announced that Steve Pronger was signed as head coach, coming to the Hitmen after serving as the head coach of the Chicago Blaze of the AAHL.

Pronger was replaced prior to the 2011–12 season by Brent Agrusa. The team also relocated to the Fox Valley Ice Arena in Geneva, Illinois on a five-year lease. During the 2011–12 season, the Hitmen were reportedly locked out of the Fox Valley Ice Arena due to unpaid bills. The team and arena management came to short agreement to finish out the season but when the season was complete, the arena took the Hitmen ownership to court over $100,000 in disputed charges. The Hitmen folded prior to the 2012–13 season.

== Season-by-season records ==
Season	GP	W	L	OTL	Pts	GF	GA	PIM	Regular season finish	Playoffs
2010–11	58	9	45	4	22	132	286	883	7th of 8, North; 15th of 26, NAHL	Did not qualify
2011–12	60	13	42	5	31	166	310	1,106	5th of 5, Midwest; 26th of 28, NAHL	Did not qualify

== NA3HL Jr. A Tier III ==
The Hitmen organization began as the Chicago Force of the Central States Hockey League. That team continued to operate alongside the NAHL's Hitmen, and also were renamed as the Hitmen name for 2011–12. In November 2010, the CSHL fell under the direction of the NAHL and changed its name to the North American 3 Hockey League (NA3HL).

== GLJHL Jr. B Tier III ==
The Hitmen also fielded a team in the Great Lakes Junior Hockey League (GLJHL). The team previously played at the Tier III Jr. C level as the Chicago Huskies and played at the International Ice Center in Romeoville, Illinois. The league advanced to the Tier III Jr. B level beginning in the 2010–11 season. This team would also fold in 2011 and the franchise was replaced by the Chicago Jr. Bulldogs.
