= Great Lakes Hockey League =

Great Lakes Hockey League may refer to:

- Great Lakes Hockey League (adult), an adult hockey league in Michigan and Wisconsin
- Great Lakes Hockey League (Ohio), Ohio ice hockey athletic conference
