= Joseph E. Meyer =

American botanist, writer, illustrator and publisher

Joseph Ernest Meyer
- Born: September 5, 1878; Kenosha, Wisconsin, U.S.
- Died: March 9, 1950; Miami, Florida, U.S. (Aged 72)
- Known for: Indiana Botanic Gardens founder
- Scientific career
- Fields: Herbology, botany

Joseph Ernest Meyer (September 5, 1878 – March 9, 1950) was a botanist, writer, illustrator, publisher, and supplier of pharmaceutical-grade herbs and roots to the drug trade who became a prominent citizen and eventually a millionaire in Northwest Indiana. He was the founder of the Indiana Botanic Gardens, Calumet National Bank and Meyer Publishing (now MeyerBooks). At his death he was said to be the world's largest distributor of herbs used in salves, cosmetics, and medicines.

== The Herbalist publications ==
Meyer not only supplied large pharmaceutical firms with drug-grade botanicals, he made up and packaged medical, culinary, and magical herbs for retail sales through his mail order catalogues and yearly almanacs. Many of the plants were raised in Indiana, but he also travelled the world to connect with growers in tropical and Mediterranean climates, and was a major importer of raw botanicals. The Indiana Botanic Garden catalogues and almanacs were illustrated with his own artwork, both line-art and water colours, and he wrote extensively about the folkloric customs employed by herbalists from many cultures. The articles and illustrations that he produced for the yearly catalogues were eventually collected into books, among which the most popular was titled The Herbalist and Herb Doctor.

After Meyer's death, his son, Clarence Meyer, gathered some of the previously uncollected almanac articles for posthumous publication, with additional artwork which he drew himself.

== Residences ==
Meyer built an elaborate Jacobethan Revival residence called Meyer's Castle in today's Dyer; he lived there until his death in 1950. Construction on the "castle" started in 1927 and took years to complete. L. Cosby Bernard Sr. of Hammond was the architect. It is nestled on a prehistoric sand dune that runs along the south side of US Route 30. This US Route once served as part of the Lincoln Highway and parallels the ancient Native American Sauk Trail. Meyer was inspired after visiting the Scottish Highlands.

Meyer's Castle now serves as a special events venue and much of the original grounds surrounding it were redeveloped into the Castlewood Subdivision. The "castle" has 43 rooms, 215 windows and immaculate rolling gardens on 16+ acres surrounding the building. The historic landmark features two octagon-shaped bays located at its northeast and southwest corners.

During the 1920s and early 1930s, prior to occupying Meyer's Castle, he and his family lived in the John Henry McClay Mansion at 226 Waltham St. in Hammond, directly across from the south end of Harrison Park. They were the home's 2nd occupants, it having been constructed by renowned building contractor McClay for his own family in 1909. By 1941, his third child Howard G. Meyer, founder of Meyer's Heating & Appliance Co, had moved back in to 226 Waltham St. with his own young family.

Joseph E. Meyer's seed catalog operation, which began in earnest in 1910, was originally out of a small wood-frame building less than one block east of this home, at the SW corner of Waltham St. & Lyman Ave. This building was gone by the end of the 1910s.

He also constructed a mansion in 1926 along the north side of the Little Calumet River in Hammond, Indiana, in association with his Indiana Botanic Gardens. This mansion functioned as the headquarters of the Indiana Botanic Gardens until 1990, when the family-owned company moved to a newer facility in Hobart, Indiana. The mansion still stands today under Meyer Family ownership and is used seasonally by Hluska Enterprises, Inc, as a tenant. During the summer, it is a retail fireworks outlet (Good Times Fireworks) and in the fall it is the site of the famous Reaper's Realm Haunted House. As of December 2023, this English (Tudor) style gabled mansion is in danger of demolition, as the City of Hammond has recently expanded their Hammond Gateways Redevelopment Allocation Area to include this and adjacent sites. This will depend upon the ability for future private developer proposals to either rehabilitate and reuse the building or to raze it.

Meyer died in Miami, Florida, on March 9, 1950.

== Publications ==
- The Herbalist and Herb Doctor. Hammond, IN: Indiana Herb Gardens, 1918.
- The Old Herb Doctor. Glenwood, IL: Meyerbooks, 1984.
- Nature's Remedies: Early History and Uses of Botanic Drugs as Revealed in the Legends and Anecdotes of Ancient Times. Hammond, IN: Indiana Botanic Gardens, 1934.
- The Herb Doctor and Medicine Man: A Collection of Valuable Medicinal Formulae and Guide to the Manufacture of Botanical Medicines. Copyrighted 1922 by Joseph E Meyer, Hammond, Ind.
- Protection—the Sealed Book. Milwaukee, WI, first published in 1901.
