= Chicago Jr. Bulldogs =

- City: Romeoville, Illinois
- League: North American 3 Hockey League
- Division: Central
- Founded: 2010
- Home arena: Canlan Ice Sports
- Colors: Red, black and white

Franchise history
- 2010–2011: Chicago Force
- 2011–2012: Chicago Hitmen
- 2013–2016: Chicago Jr. Bulldogs
- 2016–2017: Chicago Bulldogs
- 2017–2021: Wausau RiverWolves
- 2021–present: Wausau Cyclones

The Chicago Jr. Bulldogs (aka Chicago Bulldogs) were a Tier III junior ice hockey team playing in the North American 3 Hockey League. The Bulldogs played their home games at the Canlan Ice Sports in Romeoville, Illinois.

== History ==
After the Chicago Hitmen folded in 2012, their NA3HL affiliate went dormant. A year later, Ken Kestas purchased the franchise and brought it back as the Chicago Jr. Bulldogs.

After three increasingly poor seasons, the Jr. Bulldogs were purchased by Exceed Hockey Group, LLC. At the time, the group also owned the Minnesota Magicians of the NAHL and, other than a new logo and dropping 'Jr.' from their name, no further changes were made. Less than a year later, the franchise was sold again. The new owners, REB Enterprise, LLC, moved the team to Wausau, Wisconsin and changed the name to the 'Wausau RiverWolves'.

== Season-by-season records ==
Season	GP	W	L	OTL	SOL	Pts	GF	GA	Regular season finish	Playoffs
Chicago Jr. Bulldogs
2013–14	48	24	17	7	-	55	201	197	4th of 6, Central Div. 11th of 21, NA3HL	Lost Div. Semifinal series, 0–2 (Peoria Mustangs)
2014–15	47	19	24	4	-	42	158	195	5th of 6, Central Div. 21st of 31, NA3HL	Did not qualify
2015–16	47	2	45	0	-	4	75	427	5th of 5, Central Div. 34th of 34, NA3HL	Did not qualify
Chicago Bulldogs
2016–17	47	1	45	0	1	3	67	505	6th of 6, Central Div. 48th of 48, NA3HL	Did not qualify
