= Joe Burton =

American ice hockey player (born 1967)

- Born: April 23, 1967 (age 58) Garden City, Michigan, U.S.
- Height: 5 ft 9 in (175 cm)
- Weight: 170 lb (77 kg; 12 st 2 lb)
- Position: Center
- Shot: Right
- Played for: Oklahoma City Blazers; Motor City Mechanics
- NHL draft: Undrafted
- Playing career: 1992–2005

Joe Burton (born April 23, 1967), is a retired American professional ice hockey player, most notably for the Oklahoma City Blazers of the Central Hockey League. He is not only the career leader in almost every major statistical category for the Blazers, but the all-time leading goals and points scorer in CHL history, and one of the leading goal scorers in minor league hockey history.

== Career ==
Burton played college hockey for the University of Michigan-Dearborn Wolverines, a Division I American Collegiate Hockey Association program below the level of major NCAA collegiate hockey. After graduation, he played in 1992 with the Austrian national team, which finished 1st in the B Pool at the World Championships. Burton was named both the best defensive player of the B Pool tourney and to the pool's all-star squad.

He signed with the Oklahoma City Blazers of the CHL for the 1992-93 season—the inaugural year for the revived CHL—and finished 4th in team scoring, while leading the team in goals and points in the playoffs, where the Blazers lost in the finals to their archrivals, the Tulsa Oilers.

Burton played eleven seasons in all for Oklahoma City, leading them to nine division titles and championships in 1996 and 2001. He was named a First- or Second Team All-Star every season between 1998 and 2003, and won the Bill Levins Trophy as league Most Valuable Player in 1998 and 2001.

Retiring in 2003, Burton sat out one season, and then signed with the United Hockey League's Motor City Mechanics for the 2004-05 season. On a team featuring numerous National Hockey League veterans with the season's lockout -- Chris Chelios, Bryan Smolinski, Derian Hatcher, Mike Fountain and Sean Avery—he nonetheless had twice as many goals as anyone else on the team. It proved to be his final action, and Burton retired for good after the 2005 season.

Burton also played in Roller Hockey International for the Oklahoma Coyotes in 1994 and 1995, leading the team in goals both seasons.

== Legacy ==
Burton is the CHL's all-time leader in both goals (565) and points (985) scored; he had nearly two hundred more goals than the second-most leading goal scorer. He is also 5th in games played and 13th in penalty minutes. At the time of his retirement, he held or shared nineteen different league records.

For the minor leagues as a whole, Burton is tied for 9th all time for goals with 601. He is 50th all time in points with 1049.

The CHL eventually renamed its trophy for the season's leading scorer in Burton's honor, the Joe Burton Award. (Ironically, Burton himself never led the league in scoring over a season.) He was also the first player inducted into the CHL's Hall of Fame, an honor he received in 2012.

He retired to his hometown of Garden City, Michigan, where he manages an ice rink in Westland, Michigan which is Mike Modano Arena.

== Coaching ==
Burton spent a single season as player-assistant coach of the Blazers in 1999.
