= Black Diamond Hockey League =

Ice hockey league in the Western United States

- Sport: Ice hockey
- Founded: 2014
- First season: 2014–15
- Folded: 2019
- No. of teams: 8
- Country: United States
- Last champion: Sun Valley Suns (2019)
- Most titles: Sun Valley Suns (3)

The Black Diamond Hockey League (BDHL) was a semi-professional ice hockey league consisting of teams from the Western United States. Teams competed for the Joe Casey Cup, named in honor of the former Jackson Hole Moose team captain who died suddenly at the age of 37.

== History ==
The league was founded in 2014 with four member clubs: the Bozeman Stingers, Jackson Hole Moose, Park City Pioneers, and Sun Valley Suns. Teams played a 12-game schedule followed by a single-elimination playoff with the winner awarded the Joe Casey Cup.

In the first-ever league game, Jackson Hole shut out Park City 4-0. Jackson Hole upset regular season winner Sun Valley, who were a perfect 12-0, to capture the first league championship.

Season two in the BDHL saw the Park City Pioneers folding. The league replaced the team with the Missoula Desperados to remain at four teams.

The Sun Valley Suns avenged their championship loss by defeating Jackson Hole for the 2016 title.

== Teams ==
Team	City	Arena	Joined
Aspen Leafs	Aspen, CO	Lewis Ice Arena	2019
Bozeman Stingers	Bozeman, MT	Haynes Pavilion	2014
Breckenridge Vipers	Breckenridge, CO	Stephen C. West Ice Arena	2019
Jackson Hole Moose	Jackson Hole, WY	Snow King Sports & Events Center	2014
Park City Pioneers	Park City, UT	Park City Ice Arena	2019
Sun Valley Suns	Hailey, ID	Hailey Campion Ice House	2014
Texas Titans	Irving, TX	Children's Health StarCenter	2019
Vail Yeti	Vail, CO	Dobson Arena	2019

=== Former teams ===
- Missoula Desperados (2015–17)
- Park City Pioneers (2014–15) - returned in 2019
- Vail Yeti (2017–18) - returned in 2019

== Champions ==
Season	Champions	Runner-up	Result
2014-15	Jackson Hole Moose	Sun Valley Suns	5-2
2015-16	Sun Valley Suns	Jackson Hole Moose	4-2
2016-17	Jackson Hole Moose	Bozeman Stingers	5-4
2017-18	Sun Valley Suns	Jackson Hole Moose	5-0
2018-19	Sun Valley Suns	Jackson Hole Moose	5-4

== Alumni ==
- Garnet Exelby (Sun Valley Suns) - Atlanta Thrashers, Toronto Maple Leafs
- David Booth - Florida Panthers, Vancouver Canucks, Toronto Maple Leafs, Admiral Vladivostok, Avangard Omsk, Detroit Red Wings, Dinamo Minsk
- Brian Gibbons (Park City Pioneers) - EHC Neuweid, Hanover Indians, EHC Preussen Berlin
- Christian Hanson (Sun Valley Suns) - Toronto Maple Leafs, Stavanger Oilers
- Evan MacIntosh (Park City Pioneers) - Oxford City Stars, Boro/Vetlanda HC, Lindefallets SK, Delaware Thunder
- Ryan Widmar (Sun Valley Suns) - IFK Strömsund Hockey, Oxford City Stars, Antwerp Phantoms, HK Celje, Gladsaxe Bears, Poitiers Dragons

== See also ==
- List of ice hockey leagues
- Federal Prospects Hockey League
- Southern Professional Hockey League
- Great Lakes Hockey League
- Mountain West Hockey League
