= Chicago Hitmen (NA3HL) =

- City: Geneva, Illinois
- League: North American 3 Hockey League
- Division: Central
- Founded: 2010
- Folded: 2012
- Home arena: Fox Valley Ice Arena
- Colors: Black, red and gray
- Affiliates: Chicago Hitmen

Franchise history
- 2010–2011: Chicago Force
- 2011–2012: Chicago Hitmen
- 2013–2016: Chicago Jr. Bulldogs
- 2016–2017: Chicago Bulldogs
- 2017–2021: Wausau RiverWolves
- 2021–present: Wausau Cyclones

The Chicago Hitmen (aka Chicago Force) were a Tier III junior ice hockey team playing in the North American 3 Hockey League. The Hitmen played their home games at the Fox Valley Ice Arena in Geneva, Illinois.

== History ==
In 2010, the Chicago Hitmen were admitted as an expansion franchise to the North American Hockey League (NAHL). That same year, the team also founded a Tier III franchise, the Chicago Force, that began play in the Central States Hockey League. The Force took the name of a separate junior team that had been active from 1998 through 2010. During its inaugural season, the CSHL was acquired by the NAHL and renamed as the North American 3 Hockey League. Before the start of the following season, the Force were renamed as the Hitmen but the team's financial situation was precarious. Prior to the season, the parent club had signed a 5-year lease with the Fox Valley Ice Arena but they were eventually locked out of the building due to unpayment of their bills. The two sides came to arrangement where the two teams could finish out the season, however, the rink operators sued the Hitmen's ownership group for $100,000 in unpaid fees. With no arena at their disposal, both Hitmen teams went dormant before the following year.

== Season-by-season records ==
Season	GP	W	L	OTL	SOL	Pts	GF	GA	Regular season finish	Playoffs
Chicago Force
2010–11	48	24	17	7	-	55	201	197	4th of 6, Central Div. 11th of 21, NA3HL	Lost Div. Semifinal series, 0–2 (Peoria Mustangs)
Chicago Hitmen
2011–12	47	19	24	4	-	42	158	195	5th of 6, Central Div. 21st of 31, NA3HL	Did not qualify
