= Kira Hurley =

Canadian ice hockey player

- Born: 16 May 1985 (age 40) Toronto, Ontario, Canada
- Height: 5 ft 11 in (180 cm)
- Weight: 134 lb (61 kg; 9 st 8 lb)
- Position: Goaltender
- Catches: Left
- CWHL team Former teams: Brampton Thunder; Clarkson University (NCAA DI); Evansville IceMen (AAHL); Broome County Barons (FHL)
- Playing career: 2004–present

Kira Hurley (born 16 May 1985) is a Canadian professional ice hockey player. Hurley was born in Toronto, Ontario. She is credited with being the first female goalie ever to register a point in a men's professional game.

== Playing career ==
Kira Hurley played women's ice hockey from 2004 through 2007 for the Clarkson University Golden Knights, an NCAA Division III school, that plays at the Division I level in hockey. Hurley was the first-ever member of the Golden Knights Division I program to be named an All-American when she was named to the second team of the American Hockey Coaches Association all-star squad in March 2006. Hurley has also been an Eastern College Athletic Conference Hockey League Goaltender of the Year while being selected Goaltender of the Week numerous times. In four years at Clarkson, the five feet ten inches tall Hurley won 48 games and posted an impressive 20 shutouts. She also earned Female Student Athlete of the Year honors at Clarkson and gained league honor roll status.

Following her collegiate career, Hurley signed to play minor league professional hockey with the Mon Valley Thunder of the Mid-Atlantic Hockey League. However, the league folded before she could be cleared for a work visa. Hurley then signed to play top amateur hockey in Canada for the Marmora Lakers of the Eastern Ontario Senior Hockey League for the 2008 season. Hurley was 0–5 for the Lakers, with a .768 save percentage, making 156 saves. She made 47 saves in one game, a 7–6 loss to Simcoe County. During her last game with the Lakers, she made 36 saves in a 5–4 loss to the Frankford Huskies.

In 2009, Hurley signed to play for the Evansville IceMen, a United States minor league professional team located in Evansville, Indiana that plays in the All American Hockey League. During the 2008–2009 AAHL hockey season, Kira played in two games for a total of 72 minutes, allowing six goals on 35 shots for a 4.99 goals-against average, the best on the team.

Kira became the first female goalie ever to register a point in a men's professional game when she assisted on a goal on 14 February 2009 in a 24–4 win against the Chicago Blaze. Because of this achievement, Kira's goalie stick and game sweater is on display at the Hockey Hall of Fame in Toronto, Ontario, Canada in the minor league section of the Hall.

For the 2010–11 season, Hurley played for the Broome County Barons of the Federal Hockey League. Hurley left Broome County when the team relocated. She later joined the Brampton Thunder at the end of season 2010–11 in the Canadian Women's Hockey League.
