= Indiana Botanic Gardens =

Coordinates: 41°32′59″N 87°18′2″W

- Interactive map of Indiana Botanic Gardens
- Location: Hammond, Indiana

The Indiana Botanic Gardens is the largest and oldest retailer of herbs in the United States.

== Founder ==
Born in Wisconsin in 1878, Joseph E. Meyer acquired a curiosity about plants and nature at a young age. His father, who was a photographer, often took Meyer out on assignments into forests and fields. From here, he learned a great deal about various aspects of nature. Complications in Meyer's family and financial life caused him to temporarily step aside from nature and take up a career in printing. Meyer soon found himself in Chicago working for a large printer. Not long after, a strike shut down the printer and Meyer began working for The Hammond Times.

After settling in Hammond, Meyer desired to have a business of his own, preferably something in the printing industry. Giving consideration to his set of skills, Meyer realized that he knew a great deal about printing and even more about nature. A company that sold herbs through a catalogue would be a profitable endeavor thanks to his possession of an old printing press and vast knowledge of natural remedies. It was with the blending of these two passions that gave birth to Indiana Botanic Gardens.

== The company ==
Indiana Botanic Gardens is a privately owned, family-run business that operates within the vitamin and herbal supplement industry. The Indiana Botanic Gardens have had a history in the Northwest Indiana region for nearly 100 years. Its history can be read about in botanical and herbal publications, as well as literature pertaining to the history of the Calumet Region. The Indiana Botanic Gardens were founded in 1910 by horticulturalist and herbalist Joseph Meyer (1878–1950) in a small cottage in the rear of his home in Hammond, Indiana.

Initially called the Indiana Herb Gardens, the business barely covered living expenses for the large Meyer family, which eventually consisted of seven sons and one daughter. Joseph Meyer's elder sons helped their father to grow the business by gathering herbs from the nearby fields. The family packed boxes, filled orders, fed the printing press, and folded circulars during the day. The daily workload for the Meyer's often bled into their evenings where they put catalogs together by binding them with needles and thread.

Once the company began to sustain itself, it moved from Meyer's cottage to a larger building off of Calumet Avenue in Hammond, Indiana. Due in part to his roots as a printer, Joseph E. Meyer published a 400-page book in 1918 entitled, The Herbalist. Seven years later, The Herbalist Almanac, an annual publication, was produced in 1925. The Herbalist Almanac was a booklet contains listings of the herbs and roots that the company sold, recipes, Indian weather forecasts, treatments for common ailments, popular songs of the day, and advice on farming issues. In 1979, after fifty-four years of publication, The Herbalist Almanac was retired. Vintage copies of The Herbalist Almanac are still around, some dating back to the 1950s, and can be purchased online through book shops and eBay. There are many collectors and agricultural, botanical, and gardening enthusiasts that have copies. Colleges and universities still study and use the almanack for educational purposes in many horticulture classes. The University of Florida also contributed to the preservation effort and has a number of the almanacks ranging from 1929 to 1971 in their rare book collection. A copy of The Herbalist can be found in the Smithsonian Institution Library.

Later, in 1925, Meyer purchased a wild tract of land on the Little Calumet River. The land held a profusion of medicinal plants, shrubbery, and virgin forest. One year later, in 1926, this fertile ground would become home to the newly named Indiana Botanic Gardens. The offices and warehouse were now housed in a 36,000-square-foot (3,300 m^{2}) English gabled building. The grounds and gardens covered 10 acres (40,000 m^{2}) and were filled with beautiful landscaping and architecture. The property also featured a mill where all of the botanicals were manufactured.

The mansion still stands today under Meyer Family ownership and is used seasonally by Hluska Enterprises Inc, as a tenant. During the summer, it is a retail fireworks outlet (Good Times Fireworks) and in the fall it is the site of the famous Reaper's Realm Haunted House. As of December 2023, this English (Tudor) style gabled mansion is in danger of demolition, as the City of Hammond has recently expanded their Hammond Gateways Redevelopment Allocation Area to include this and adjacent sites. This will depend upon the ability for future private developer proposals to either rehabilitate and reuse the building or to raze it.

During the next few years, Meyer travelled to all parts of North America to gather material and information on native plants and their uses. He received mail on an international scale from universities, libraries, botanists, and people from all ranks of life. In 1932, he travelled to Europe to seek rare herbals. In Joseph Meyer's time, self-treatment with herbs was commonly practiced and often necessary due to economic conditions or the scarcity of professional medical help. Meyer devoted his life to providing herbs to people, and many grateful customers sent letters and recipes extolling the benefits. The Old Herb Doctor was compiled from this information to let other customers know how other customers had used herbs and the good results they had obtained from them.

The business has been handed down from generation to generation on to his grandson David Meyer, who is still part of the organization, along with great-grandson Tim Cleland, current president of the company. In 1990, the company moved into a more modern facility in nearby Hobart, Indiana. Although no longer a grower of herbs, Indiana Botanic Gardens sells vitamins, essential oils, teas, beauty care products, and other nutritional supplements in addition to being a distributor of bulk herbals. The Hobart location has a retail store that contains the majority of the Botanic Choice line and also sells wholesale products. The bulk of the business continues to be derived from mail order catalogue sales. However, with the re-launch of their website in May 2008, the Indiana Botanic Gardens have been focusing on expanding their online operations.

- The old IBG building is still standing in Hammond, IN off of I-80/94. For those individuals that are familiar with the area, Reaper's Realm Haunted Mansion is housed in the building Joseph Meyer built in 1926.
- In 1998, the United States House of Representatives paid a tribute to Joseph Meyer for being an upstanding citizen within his community.
- The Indiana Botanic Gardens has a growing list of health articles covering a wide array of topics from exercise, to male concerns, to detoxification.
