= Mike Fountain =

Canadian ice hockey player

- Born: January 26, 1972 (age 54) North York, Ontario, Canada
- Height: 6 ft 1 in (185 cm)
- Weight: 180 lb (82 kg; 12 st 12 lb)
- Position: Goaltender
- Caught: Left
- Played for: Vancouver Canucks; Carolina Hurricanes; Ottawa Senators; HC Lada Togliatti; Iserlohn Roosters; Traktor Chelyabinsk
- NHL draft: 45th overall, 1992; Vancouver Canucks
- Playing career: 1992–2009

Michael Fountain (born January 26, 1972) is a Canadian former professional ice hockey goaltender who played in the National Hockey League (NHL) with the Vancouver Canucks, Carolina Hurricanes, and Ottawa Senators. He also played several seasons in the American Hockey League (AHL), as well as in the Russian Superleague. Since retiring as a player, he became an Assistant Coach for the Team Canada Para Hockey Team.

== Playing career ==
Fountain grew up in the small town of Gravenhurst, Ontario. As a 15-year-old, Fountain played Jr.C. hockey for the Hunstville Blair McCanns in 1988-89. He was named rookie of the year and made the All Star Team. Fountain was drafted in the 15th round of the 1989 OHL Draft by the S.S. Marie Greyhounds.

After being drafted by the Greyhounds, he was assigned to the Chatham Micmacs Jr.B. hockey club in 1989-90 where he was teammates with future NHL players Todd Warriner and Brian Wiseman. The Micmacs won the Western JR B Championship

Fountain played two seasons of junior hockey in the Ontario Hockey League with the Oshawa Generals and was named to the OHL First All-Star team in 1992. He was also one of the netminders for Canada at that year's World Junior Championships. Following his junior success, Fountain was selected 45th overall in the 1992 NHL entry draft by the Vancouver Canucks.

Fountain turned pro for the 1992–93 season, and was assigned to the Hamilton Canucks of the American Hockey League. He played for the Syracuse Crunch from 94-97 with a GA of 3.2. http://www.hockeydb.com/ihdb/stats/pdisplay.php?pid=1754 He established himself as one of the top goalies outside of the NHL with a standout 1993–94 campaign, during which he led the AHL with 70 appearances, 34 wins, and 4 shutouts, and was named to the league's Second All-Star Team.

However, cracking the NHL would be difficult for Fountain. Just as it appeared he was ready to succeed Kay Whitmore as the backup to Kirk McLean with the Canucks, the team acquired highly rated Corey Hirsch, who passed Fountain on the depth chart and was promoted directly to the NHL. Fountain proceeded to toil for two more seasons in the AHL without getting an NHL opportunity. He was finally able to make his NHL debut midway through the 1996–97 season, and did so in memorable style. He became the 19th goalie in NHL history to record a shutout in his first NHL game, doing so against the New Jersey Devils, and nearly scored a goal as well, sending the puck just a few feet wide of the empty net late in the game. He finished the year with a 2–2–0 record and a 3.43 GAA in 6 appearances.

Fountain left Vancouver to sign as a free agent with the Carolina Hurricanes for the 1997–98. He signed with the Ottawa Senators in 1999 and spent two seasons with the organization as their third goaltender, appearing in one NHL game in both years while performing well in the IHL and setting standards no Griffins goalie has attained since. He was named an IHL All Star in 2000/2001 season.

In 2001, Fountain left North America to sign in the Russian Super League with HC Lada Togliatti and led the RHL in GAA in his first season. He also set the all time Russian shutout record with 14 shutouts in 43 starts. After two years in Russia, he signed in Germany for 2003–04 with the Iserlohn Roosters. He returned to Russia in 2005, playing for Traktor Chelyabinsk, where he won the Russian Championship and was named MVP before re-joining Lada Togliatti in 2006.

In all, Fountain appeared in 11 NHL games, posting a 2–6–0 record with a 3.47 GAA.

== Career statistics ==
=== Regular season and playoffs ===
			Regular season									Playoffs
Season	Team	League	GP	W	L	T	MIN	GA	SO	GAA	SV%	GP	W	L	MIN	GA	SO	GAA	SV%
1988–89	Huntsville Huskies	GMOHL	22	18	3	2	1306	82	0	3.77	—	—	—	—	—	—	—	—	—
1989–90	Chatham MicMac	WOHL	21	—	—	—	1249	76	0	3.65	—	—	—	—	—	—	—	—	—
1990–91	Sault Ste. Marie Greyhounds	OHL	7	5	2	0	380	19	0	3.00	.898	—	—	—	—	—	—	—	—
1990–91	Oshawa Generals	OHL	30	17	5	1	1483	84	0	3.40	.887	8	1	4	292	26	0	5.34	—
1991–92	Oshawa Generals	OHL	40	18	13	6	2260	149	1	3.96	.890	7	3	4	429	26	0	3.64	—
1992–93	Hamilton Canucks	AHL	12	2	8	0	618	46	0	4.47	.862	—	—	—	—	—	—	—	—
1992–93	Canada National Team	Intl	13	7	5	1	745	37	1	2.98	—	—	—	—	—	—	—	—	—
1993–94	Hamilton Canucks	AHL	70	34	28	6	4005	241	4	3.61	.886	3	0	2	146	12	0	4.92	.782
1994–95	Syracuse Crunch	AHL	61	25	29	7	3618	225	2	3.73	.887	—	—	—	—	—	—	—	—
1995–96	Syracuse Crunch	AHL	54	21	27	3	3060	184	1	3.61	.887	15	8	7	915	57	2	3.74	.884
1996–97	Vancouver Canucks	NHL	6	2	2	0	245	14	1	3.43	.896	—	—	—	—	—	—	—	—
1996–97	Syracuse Crunch	AHL	25	8	14	2	1462	78	1	3.20	.891	2	0	2	120	12	0	6.02	.797
1997–98	Carolina Hurricanes	NHL	3	0	3	0	163	10	0	3.68	.853	—	—	—	—	—	—	—	—
1997–98	Beast of New Haven	AHL	50	25	19	5	2992	139	3	2.85	.903	—	—	—	—	—	—	—	—
1998–99	Beast of New Haven	AHL	51	23	24	3	2989	150	2	3.01	.914	—	—	—	—	—	—	—	—
1999–00	Ottawa Senators	NHL	1	0	0	0	16	1	0	3.87	.833	—	—	—	—	—	—	—	—
1999–00	Grand Rapids Griffins	IHL	36	21	7	4	1851	77	3	2.50	.910	1	0	0	20	4	0	12.00	.714
2000–01	Ottawa Senators	NHL	1	0	1	0	59	3	0	3.07	.880	—	—	—	—	—	—	—	—
2000–01	Grand Rapids Griffins	IHL	52	34	10	6	3005	104	6	2.08	.924	8	5	3	522	21	1	2.41	.908
2001–02	Lada Togliatti	RSL	43	—	—	—	2591	59	14	1.37	.931	4	—	—	249	7	0	1.69	.915
2002–03	Lada Togliatti	RSL	21	—	—	—	1028	31	5	1.81	.926	3	—	—	40	2	0	3.00	.913
2003–04	Iserlohn Roosters	DEL	34	—	—	—	1957	104	2	3.19	.899	—	—	—	—	—	—	—	—
2004–05	Motor City Mechanics	UHL	3	0	3	0	178	10	0	3.38	.907	—	—	—	—	—	—	—	—
2005–06	Traktor Chelyabinsk	RSL	39	—	—	—	—	—	—	1.24	.931	—	—	—	—	—	—	—	—
2006–07	Lada Togliatti	RSL	16	—	—	—	845	32	3	2.27	.910	—	—	—	—	—	—	—	—
2007–08	Lada Togliatti	RSL	54	—	—	—	—	132	3	2.55	.908	4	—	—	—	12	0	3.01	.879
2008–09	Lada Togliatti	KHL	14	—	—	—	638	28	0	2.63	.905	—	—	—	—	—	—	—	—
NHL totals			11	2	6	0	482	28	1	3.49	.880	—	—	—	—	—	—	—	—
