= Ford Center (Evansville) =

Indoor arena in Evansville, Indiana, US

- "Our House"
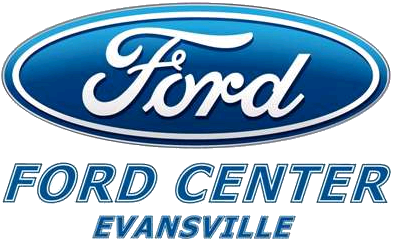

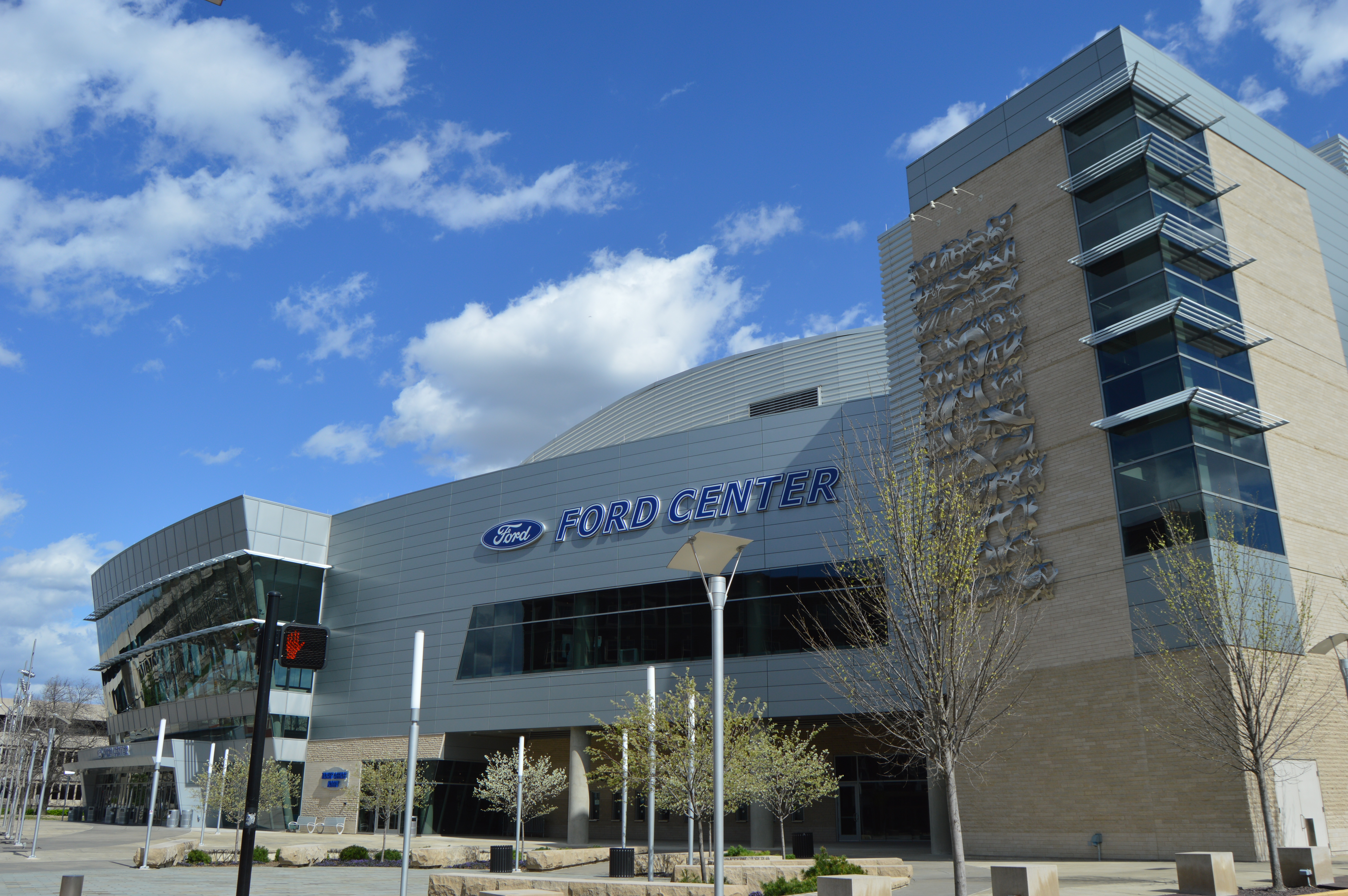

- Location within Indiana Location within the United States
- Interactive map of Ford Center
- Address: 1 Southeast Martin Luther King Jr. Boulevard
- Location: Evansville, Indiana, U.S.
- Coordinates: 37°58′19.88″N 087°34′4.24″W
- Owner: City of Evansville
- Operator: Venuworks
- Capacity: Concert: 11,000; Basketball: 10,000; Hockey: 9,000
- Surface: Multi-surface
- Public transit: METS

Construction
- Groundbreaking: October 20, 2009
- Built: October 2009
- Opened: November 5, 2011
- Cost: $127.5 million
- Architects: Populous; Hafer Associates
- Structural engineer: Thornton Tomasetti
- Services engineers: M-E Engineers, Inc.
- General contractor: Hunt/Harmon JV

Tenants
- Evansville Purple Aces men's basketball (NCAA) (2011–present); Evansville Purple Aces women's basketball (NCAA) (2011–2017); Evansville IceMen (CHL/ECHL) (2011–2016); Evansville Thunderbolts (SPHL) (2016–present)

Website
- fordcenter.com

The Ford Center is a multi-use indoor arena in downtown Evansville, Indiana, with a maximum seating capacity of 11,000. It officially opened in November 2011 and is mainly used for basketball, ice hockey, and concerts. It is home to the Evansville Thunderbolts minor league hockey team in the SPHL and the Evansville Purple Aces men's basketball team, representing the University of Evansville. The UE women's basketball team also played at Ford Center from the venue's opening, but moved its home games back to its campus starting with the 2017–18 season.

== Events ==
The first public event held at the Ford Center was an Evansville IceMen hockey game on November 5, 2011, when the IceMen defeated the Fort Wayne Komets 3–1. The first concert was held four days later on November 9, 2011, by Bob Seger and his Silver Bullet Band. The Evansville Purple Aces played their first basketball game on November 12, 2011, beating the Butler Bulldogs 80–77 in overtime.

In its first year, the new arena also hosted concerts for Elton John, Lady Antebellum, Reba, the Trans-Siberian Orchestra, Steel Panther with Judas Priest, and Cirque du Soleil's performance of Quidam.

The Ford Center played host to a game in the 2012 College Basketball Invitational, in which the Aces lost to the Princeton Tigers 95–86. The Ford Center also played host to the 2013 GLVC basketball championships and the NCAA Men's Division II Basketball Championship eight times, in 2014, 2015, 2019, and 2021 through 2025. In September 2014, the Ford Center hosted Women's Flat Track Derby Association (WFTDA) Division 1 International playoffs, hosted by local roller derby league, Demolition City Roller Derby, featuring teams from America, England and Canada. In honor of the event, Evansville mayor Lloyd Winnecke declared the week of the event to be "Roller Derby Week" in the city.

== History and construction ==
The Ford Center was designed by Populous (formerly HOK Sport) as a replacement for Roberts Municipal Stadium. The $127.5 million arena was approved by the Evansville City Council on December 22, 2008. Demolition work on the site began on December 5, 2009.

The Ford Center is bounded by Main Street, Martin Luther King Jr. Boulevard, 6th Street, and Walnut Street. As planned, it will eventually connect to a new convention hotel and the existing convention center.

On August 17, 2011, the facility's name, Ford Center, was announced. The naming rights were the result of a 10-year, $4.2 million agreement with the Tri-State Ford Dealers.

On January 18, 2012, Aces junior Colt Ryan set an arena record with 39 points in a win against the Bradley Braves.

In 2016, the ECHL's Evansville IceMen and the City of Evansville failed to come to an agreement on a new lease and the IceMen's owner, Ron Geary, announced his intentions to relocate the team to Owensboro, Kentucky. It eventually ended up in Jacksonville, Florida. In response, the City of Evansville brought in a new minor league hockey team called the Evansville Thunderbolts as part of the Southern Professional Hockey League for the 2016–17 season.

== Gallery ==
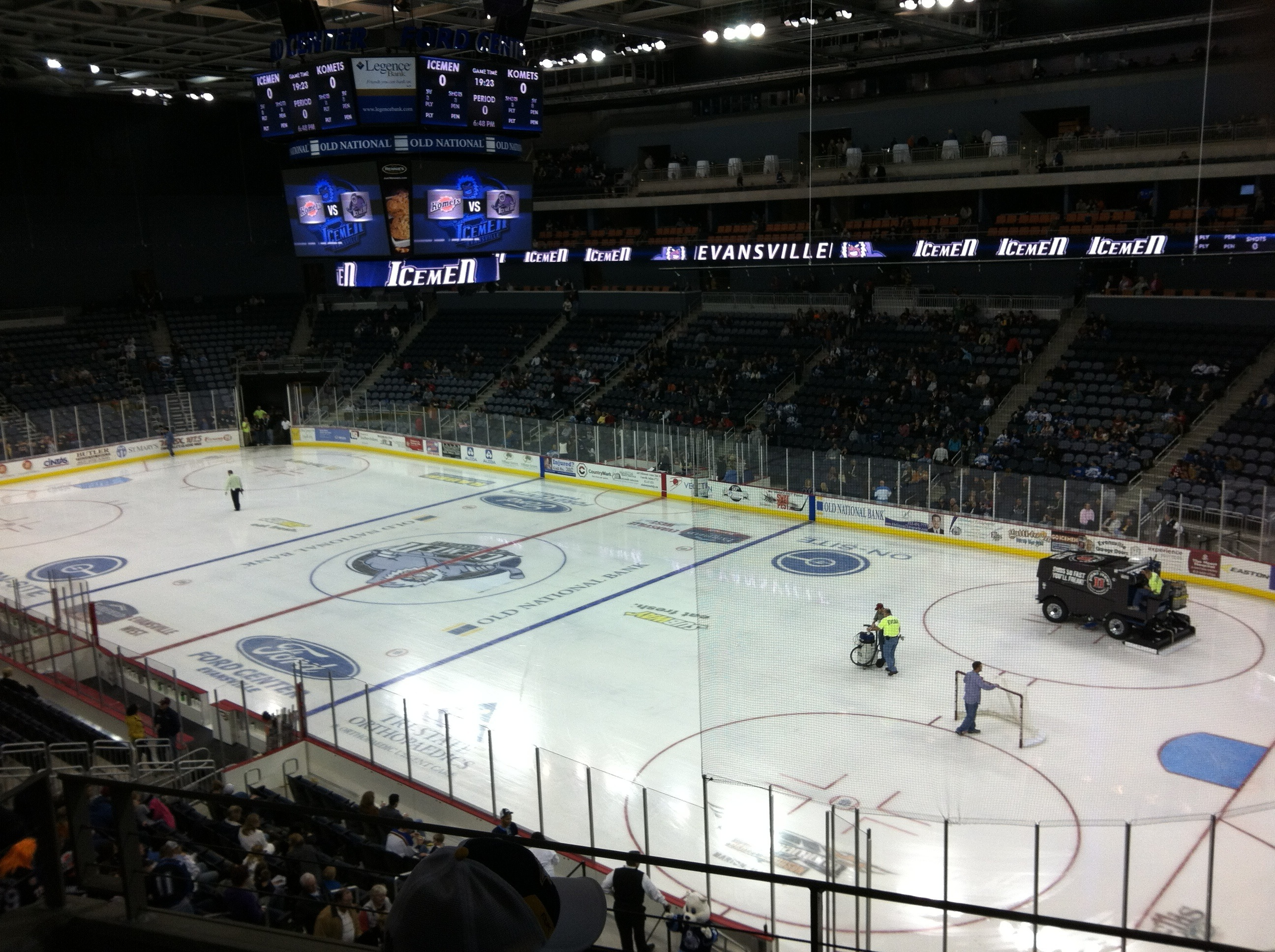
The Ford Center set up for an Evansville IceMen hockey game

== See also ==
- List of NCAA Division I basketball arenas
