= Hobart Arena =

Multi-purpose arena in Ohio, United States

Coordinates: 40.045759°N 84.205063°W

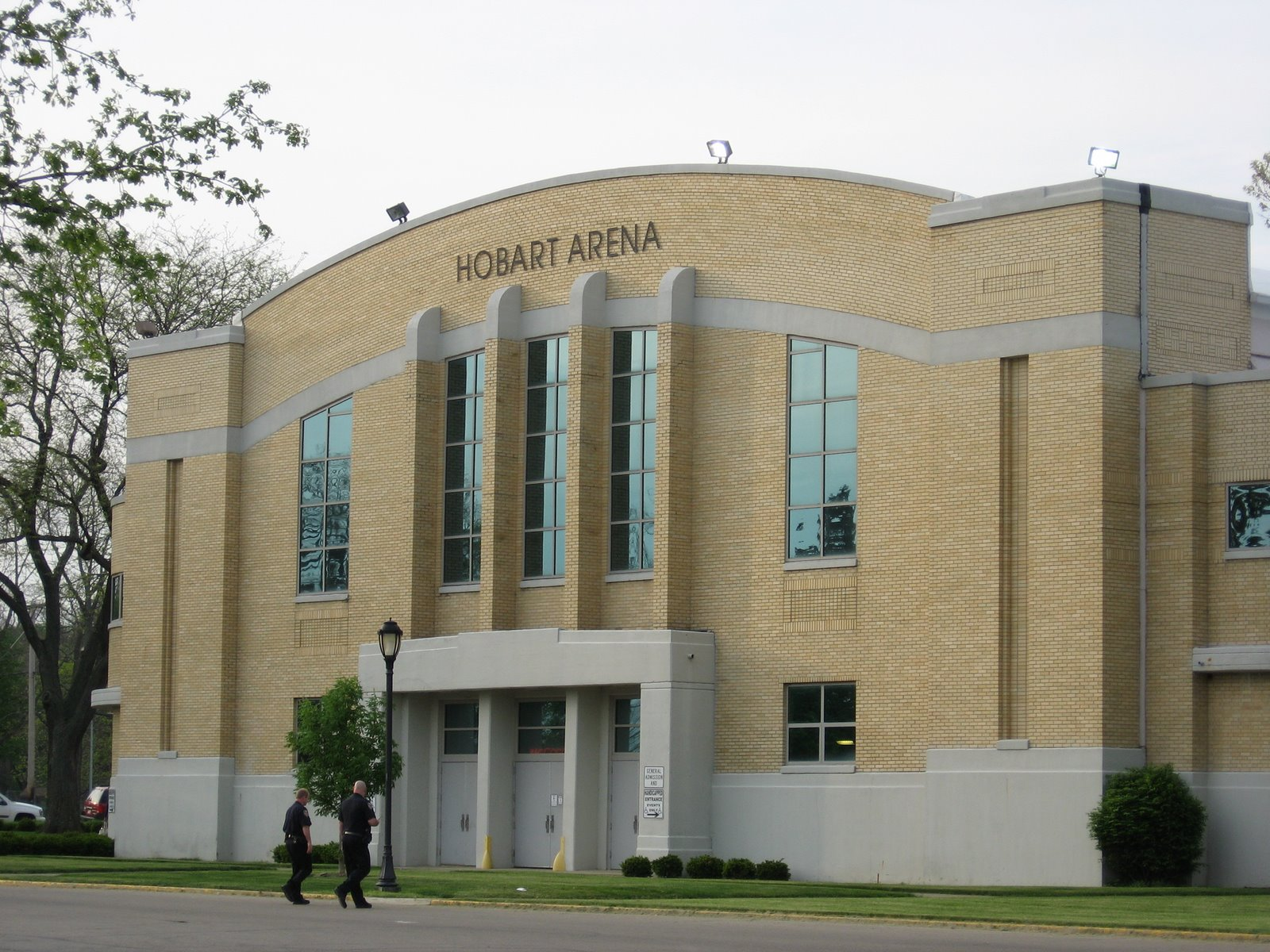
- Interactive map of Hobart Arena
- Location: 255 Adams Street; Troy, Ohio
- Owner: City of Troy, Ohio
- Capacity: 3,782

Construction
- Groundbreaking: 1947
- Opened: September 1950
- Cost: $450,000

Tenants
- Miami Valley Silverbacks (AIFL/CIFL) (2006–2008); Troy Bruins (NJHL) (2009–2010)

The Hobart Arena is a 3,782-seat multi-purpose arena in Troy, Ohio. It officially opened with 10 sold-out performances of Holiday on Ice in September 1950. The Hobart Arena, contrary to popular belief, was not the first Ohio venue for Elvis Presley on November 24, 1956, as he had played in Cleveland a year earlier. The 1950s also saw performances by Roy Rogers, Gene Autry, Nat King Cole, Tex Ritter, Sonja Henie, Victor Borge, Liberace, Guy Lombardo, and Patti Page.

As a concert venue the arena can seat up to 5,282. When used for ice hockey, Hobart Arena has a sellout capacity of 4,500. When used for trade shows the arena can accommodate 15,725 square feet (1,460.9 m^{2}) of space. The arena contains four permanent concession stands, four dressing rooms and a referee's room, seven box-office windows, and a ceiling height of only 34 feet (10 m).

It was the home to the Miami Valley Silverbacks of the Continental Indoor Football League.

On March 18, 2023 Hobart Arena hosted the first AEW House Rules show, which kicked off AEW doing professional wrestling house shows. The attendance was over 3,000.
