= Wausau RiverWolves =

- City: Wausau, Wisconsin
- League: North American 3 Hockey League
- Division: Central
- Founded: 2010
- Home arena: Marathon Park Arena
- Colors: Purple, silver and white

Franchise history
- 2010–2011: Chicago Force
- 2011–2012: Chicago Hitmen
- 2013–2016: Chicago Jr. Bulldogs
- 2016–2017: Chicago Bulldogs
- 2017–2021: Wausau RiverWolves
- 2021–present: Wausau Cyclones

The Wausau RiverWolves were a Tier III junior ice hockey team playing in the North American 3 Hockey League. The RiverWolves played their home games at the Marathon Park Arena in Wausau, Wisconsin.

== History ==
In 2016, the Chicago Bulldogs were purchased by Exceed Hockey Group, LLC. At the time, the group also owned the Minnesota Magicians of the NAHL and, other than a new logo, no further changes were made. Less than a year later, the franchise was sold for a second time. The new owners, REB Enterprise, LLC, moved the team to Wausau, Wisconsin and changed the name to the 'Wausau RiverWolves'. The new owners also controlled the New Ulm Steel, a fellow NA3HL franchise.

During their existence as the RiverWolves, the club was one of the least successful in the league. They missed the postseason in three of four seasons and finished last in their division twice. In 2021, the club was sold once more, this time to Hockey Management Group, LLC. The team changed its name and colors but was able to play out of the same arena.

== Season-by-season records ==
| Season | GP | W | L | OTL | SOL | Pts | GF | GA | Regular season finish | Playoffs |
|---|---|---|---|---|---|---|---|---|---|---|
| 2017–18 | 47 | 11 | 35 | 1 | 0 | 23 | 127 | 283 | 4th of 5, Central Div. 36th of 44, NA3HL | Lost Div. Semifinal series, 0–2 (North Iowa Bulls) |
| 2018–19 | 47 | 9 | 37 | 1 | 0 | 19 | 120 | 296 | 6th of 7, Central Div. 30th of 36, NA3HL | Did not qualify |
| 2019–20 | 47 | 6 | 38 | 3 | 0 | 15 | 96 | 291 | 6th of 6, Central Div. 32nd of 34, NA3HL | Did not qualify |
| 2020–21 | 40 | 6 | 33 | 1 | 0 | 13 | 70 | 218 | 6th of 6, Central Div. 30th of 31, NA3HL | Did not qualify |
