= Park City Ice Arena =

Ice arena in Park City, Utah

Coordinates: 40.68135°N 111.4685°W

The Park City Ice Arena is an indoor, year-round facility located in Park City, Utah. It is the home arena for the Park City Pioneers, the USA Hockey Senior Elite ice hockey team and multiple Mountain West Hockey League champions.
