= The Rink Battle Creek =

- Interactive map of The Rink Battle Creek
- Former names: Revolution Arena
- Location: 75 Houston, Battle Creek, Michigan
- Coordinates: 42.3199°N 85.1897°W
- Capacity: 1,000
- Surface: Ice

Tenants
- Battle Creek Revolution (AAHL) (2008–2011); Battle Creek Jr. Revolution (NA3HL) (2010–2014); Battle Creek Rumble Bees (FPHL) (2019–2020); Battle Creek Kernels (USPHL) (2022–present)

The Rink, formerly Revolution Arena , is a 1,000 seat multi-purpose arena in Battle Creek, Michigan. It features an 85-by-200-foot (26 m × 61 m) sheet of ice for hockey, figure skating, and open skating.

The arena is home to the Battle Creek Bruins and several adult league team. The Rink was the home of a junior hockey team, the Battle Creek Jr. Revolution of the North American 3 Hockey League and two professional ice hockey teams, the Battle Creek Revolution of the All American Hockey League and the Battle Creek Rumble Bees of the Federal Prospects Hockey League.

== History ==
The mechanical systems at The Rink failed in 2015. The Rink was sold in 2016. The previous owner, Joseph Burkhardt and the Revolution Advertising corporation sold it to Rick and Jennifer Powell. Renovations were started on the facility after the purchase.

In 2019, the Battle Creek Rumble Bees of the Federal Prospects Hockey League began play at The Rink. In 2022, the Battle Creek Kernels of the United States Premier Hockey League started play at the facility.
