= Battle Creek Rumble Bees =

Professional ice hockey team

- City: Battle Creek, Michigan
- League: Federal Prospects Hockey League
- Founded: 2019
- Folded: 2020
- Home arena: The Rink Battle Creek
- General manager: Adam Stio
- Head coach: Adam Stio
- Website: Battle Creek Rumble Bees

Franchise history
- 2019–2020: Battle Creek Rumble Bees

The Battle Creek Rumble Bees were a professional ice hockey team based in Battle Creek, Michigan. The team was a member of the Federal Prospects Hockey League and played at The Rink Battle Creek.

== History ==
In June 2019, the Federal Prospects Hockey League (FPHL) announced it had added a tenth team for the 2019–20 season and it would be in Michigan. On July 23, the Battle Creek Rumble Bees were announced with Adam Stio as the general manager after previously serving in the same role with the Southern Professional Hockey League's Evansville Thunderbolts. The FHL had played multiple neutral site games in Battle Creek over the previous seasons before placing an expansion team there.

The Rumble Bees hired Clint Hagmaier as their first head coach, however, he was released after a 0–9 start to the season with Stio taking over as interim head coach. The Rumble Bees had a 1–45–0–2 record when the league's 2019–20 season was cancelled due to the coronavirus pandemic. Their losing streak led to them being named "the worst team in professional hockey". After the season, the team's players went to different teams in the FPHL as part of a dispersal draft. The Rumble Bees' 0-23-1 start to the season gave them the longest losing streak in professional hockey history which would hold up until the Delaware Thunder lost 26 straight on January 28, 2023.
