= Meyer's Castle =

Historic house in Indiana, United States

- Joseph Ernest Meyer House
- U.S. National Register of Historic Places
- Location within Indiana Location within the United States
- Location: 1370 Joliet St., Dyer, Indiana
- Coordinates: 41°29′32″N 87°29′49″W
- Area: 15.7 acres (6.4 ha)
- Built: 1929
- Architect: Bernard Cosbey, Sr.
- Architectural style: Tudor Revival, Jacobethan Revival
- NRHP reference No.: 84001068
- Added to NRHP: March 1, 1984

Meyer's Castle or the Joseph Ernest Meyer House is a former private residence in the town of Dyer, Indiana, United States. The castle was constructed from 1927 to 1931 in the Jacobethan style by architect Cosbey Bernard Sr. The house was built for Joseph Ernest Meyer as his private residence, a herbologist and one of Hammond's first millionaires. The building now serves as a special events venue and was also home to "Rivelli", an Italian steakhouse that is now closed.

The castle was built as a replica of a Scottish castle Meyer had once seen. When it was completed in 1931, the Meyer's Castle was the largest and most lavish mansion in the surrounding Calumet region. Its location in the forested area allowed Meyer to continue his practice of herbology. The hill on which the estate sits atop of is called "Indian Hill" due to the many Sauk and Potowami artifacts found in and around the vicinity. It is also one of the highest points in Lake County, IN.

Joseph Meyer lived in Meyer's Castle until his death in 1950, leaving the castle to his wife Cecilia, who lived there for several years after his death. After the death of Cecilia Meyer in 1975, the entire castle grounds and complex was sold to the East Dyer Development Company, which subsequently became today's Castlewood Subdivision of Dyer. The castle was purchased from the town of Dyer by Cynthia and Charles Curry and later sold.

The property was purchased in 1987. At the time of purchase, the property was in an abandoned and dilapidated state. It was renovated and returned to its original majestic state. They now operate the property as a special events venue and along with a reservation only restaurant. Visitors are welcomed by peacocks that roam the grounds.

== See also ==
- List of Registered Historic Places in Indiana
