= Midwest Training & Ice Center =

Recreational sport facility in Dyer, Indiana

Midwest Training and Ice Center
- Interactive map of Midwest Training and Ice Center
- Location: Dyer, Indiana
- Coordinates: 41.426359°N 87.493174°W
- Capacity: 1,500 (Ice Hockey)
- Surface: Ice

Tenant
- Chi-Town Shooters (AAHL) (2008–2011)

Midwest Training and Ice Center is an ice arena and gymnastics and recreational sport facility in Dyer, Indiana. It features an Olympic size sheet of ice for hockey, figure skating and open skating, a state-of-the-art fitness center and facilities for gymnastics.

The arena was the home of the junior ice hockey team the Illiana Blackbirds of the USPHL Midwest until 2016. It is currently home to another team with the same nickname, the Midwest Blackbirds. The ice arena is also the home of local high school hockey teams and recreational teams. Current seating capacity for spectators is 1,500.
