= Wausau Cyclones =

- City: Wausau, Wisconsin
- League: North American 3 Hockey League
- Division: Central
- Founded: 2010
- Home arena: Marathon Park Arena
- Colors: Black, gold and white
- Owners: Hockey Management Group, LLC.
- General manager: Nathan Oystrick
- Head coach: Nathan Oystrick

Franchise history
- 2010–2011: Chicago Force
- 2011–2012: Chicago Hitmen
- 2013–2016: Chicago Jr. Bulldogs
- 2016–2017: Chicago Bulldogs
- 2017–2021: Wausau RiverWolves
- 2021–present: Wausau Cyclones

Championships
- Division titles: 1: 2024

The Wausau Cyclones are a Tier III junior ice hockey team playing in the North American 3 Hockey League. The Cyclones play their home games at the Marathon Park Arena in Wausau, Wisconsin.

== History ==
In 2016, the Chicago Bulldogs were purchased by Exceed Hockey Group, LLC. At the time, the group also owned the Minnesota Magicians of the NAHL and, other than a new logo, no further changes were made. Less than a year later, the franchise was sold for a second time. The new owners, REB Enterprise, LLC, moved the team to Wausau, Wisconsin and changed the name to the 'Wausau RiverWolves'. The new owners also controlled the New Ulm Steel, a fellow NA3HL franchise.

During their existence as the RiverWolves, the club was one of the least successful in the league. They missed the postseason in three of four seasons and finished last in their division twice. In 2021, the club was sold once more, this time to Hockey Management Group, LLC. The team changed its name and colors but was able to play out of the same arena. After a solid 1st season under the new name, Nathan Oystrick was brought in as Head coach and General manager and helped the team win its first division title in 2024.

=== Namesake ===
The original Wausau Cyclones were founded in 1972 and also played out of the Marathon Park Arena. There's some uncertainty as to when the team ceased operations as sources have reported their final season as 1999 or the early 2000s.

== Season-by-season records ==
Season	GP	W	L	OTL	SOL	Pts	GF	GA	Regular season finish	Playoffs
2021–22	47	21	24	1	1	44	122	159	4th of 6, Central Div. 19th of 34, NA3HL	Lost Div. Semifinal series, 0–2 (Rochester Grizzlies)
2022–23	47	13	30	4	0	30	127	198	5th of 6, Central Div. 28th of 34, NA3HL	Did not qualify
2023–24	47	36	10	0	1	73	211	114	1st of 6, Central Div. t–6th of 34, NA3HL	Won Div. Semifinal series, 2–0 (Wisconsin Woodsmen); Lost Div. Finals series, 0–2 (West Bend Power)
2024–25	47	33	11	2	1	69	194	121	2nd of 6, Central Div. 8th of 35, NA3HL	Lost Div. Semifinal series, 0–2 (Rochester Grizzlies)
2025–26	47	27	19	1	0	55	170	149	3rd of 6, Central Div. 17th of 38, NA3HL	Lost Div. Semifinal series, 0–2 (Rochester Grizzlies)
