= Chi-Town Shooters =

- City: Dyer, Indiana
- League: All American Hockey League
- Founded: 2008
- Home arena: Midwest Training & Ice Center
- Colors: Blue, black, white, silver
- General manager: Sue Anderson
- Head coach: Darren Seid
- Media: WJOB-1230 AM

Franchise history
- First team
- 2008–2010: Chi-Town Shooters
- Second team
- 2009: Detroit Hitmen
- 2009–2010: West Michigan Blizzard
- 2010: Indiana Blizzard
- 2010–2011: Chi-Town Shooters

Championships
- Regular season titles: 2: 2009, 2010
- Playoff championships: 1: 2009

The Chi-Town Shooters were two professional ice hockey teams that played in the All American Hockey League. They played their home games at the Midwest Training & Ice Center in Dyer, Indiana. The "Shooters" name refers to the casinos in the South Shore region of northwestern Indiana.

== History ==
On April 5, 2009, the Shooters won their first and only Rod Davidson Cup, beating the Battle Creek Revolution in the final deciding game of a best-of-five series.

The team did not return to the AAHL looking to focus on launching a junior ice hockey team instead. However, the West Michigan Blizzard relocated to the arena as the Indiana Blizzard before the 2010–11 season. By December 2010, the Blizzard had folded, and the roster was taken over by the Shooters' organization and name for the remainder of the season. By the end of the season, the only other team remaining was the Battle Creek Revolution and the league folded after the season.

== Season-by-season results ==
Season	Games	Won	Lost	T/OTL	SOL	Points	Goals for	Goals against	Final standing	Playoffs
2008–09	60	39	22	8	0	86	322	58	1st, AAHL	Rod Davidson Cup champions
2009–10	80	38	36	2	4	86	226	231	1st, AAHL	Lost in playoffs
2010–11	19	0	6	1	0	1	24	38	3rd, AAHL	Lost in finals
Totals	159	77	64	11	4	173	572	327	—	—
