= Troy Bruins (2009–2010) =

- City: Troy, Ohio
- League: All American Hockey League
- Founded: 2009
- Home arena: Hobart Arena
- Colors: Yellow, Black & White
- Owner: Troy Bruins Hockey, LLC
- Head coach: Rick Szabo
- Media: Troy5, MCP TV

Franchise history
- 2009–2010: Troy Bruins

The Troy Bruins were a professional ice hockey team which played in the All American Hockey League. The team played their home games at Hobart Arena in downtown Troy, Ohio.

== History ==
The organization was formed in 2009 as an expansion franchise in the Northern Junior Hockey League for the 2009–10 season. On May 21, 2009, the team was officially announced as the Troy Bruins. While not being affiliated with the original Troy Bruins from the International Hockey League of the 1950s, the Bruins pay homage to the Miami Valley's first hockey team and the area's rich hockey history. The organization would leave the NJHL after one season and pursued creating a minor league professional team instead.

On August 31, 2010, the team was officially announced as an expansion team in All American Hockey League.

On January 5, 2011, the team officially suspended operations, canceled all remaining games, and released all players. Their final game was a 4-2 win over the Queen City Storm on December 31, 2010. Some of their players were used to create the mid-season replacement team, the Michigan Moose.

== Season-by-season records ==
Season	GP	W	L	T	OTL	PTS	GF	GA	Finish
2009–10	43	30	12	0	1	61	256	227	2nd, NJHL
2010–11	17	8	6	0	3	19	72	69	Ceased operations mid-season
Totals	60	38	18	0	4	80	328	296	–
