= Motor City Mechanics =

Former American ice hockey team

- City: Fraser, Michigan
- League: United Hockey League
- Founded: 2004
- Home arena: Great Lakes Sports City Superior Arena
- Colors: Maroon, black, silver, white

Franchise history
- 2004–2006: Motor City Mechanics

The Motor City Mechanics were a minor professional ice hockey team in the United Hockey League. The Mechanics played two seasons from 2004 to 2006 at Great Lakes Sports City Superior Arena in Fraser, Michigan.

== History ==
The team got a major boost during their first year when a lockout cancelled the 2004–05 National Hockey League season, thus leaving the Mechanics the only professional hockey team in the Detroit market. The Mechanics signed three Detroit Red Wings players: Chris Chelios, Derian Hatcher, and Kris Draper. All three players had local ties; Hatcher had even played at the Mechanics' arena as a youth. However, due to visa problems, Canadian Kris Draper never played a game for the Mechanics. Later, Motor City also signed Bryan Smolinski and Sean Avery, so the team had four active NHL players, more than any other North American pro team during the lockout. Furthermore, the Mechanics signed Oklahoma City Blazers legend Joe Burton for what proved to be his final professional season; Burton wound up leading the team with 36 goals, twice what any other player managed. Despite the signings, the Mechanics barely played .500 hockey and missed the playoffs.

Following a league investigation concerning the February 2, 2005, game played against the Flint Generals, UHL commissioner Richard Brosal suspended Mechanics' coach Steve Shannon for the rest of the season for offering his players $200 to "take out" Generals forward Kevin Kerr. Shannon's contract was terminated by the team and hired Danton Cole on March 1, who had recently been fired by the Grand Rapids Griffins of the American Hockey League. Cole kept the position into the following season.

After being swept in the first round of the UHL playoffs, the Mechanics announced that they would suspend operations for the 2006–07 UHL season while the owners were looking to relocate the team. The franchise was sold to a new owner who planned to keep the team in the Detroit area with home games at the Michigan State Fairgrounds Coliseum starting in 2008, but it never came to fruition.

== Season-by-season records ==
Season	GP	W	L	OTL	Pts	GF	GA	PIM	Standing	Playoffs
2004–05	80	37	36	7	81	229	262	1872	3rd Central Division	Did not qualify
2005–06	76	40	30	6	86	251	246	1768	3rd Central Division	Lost quarterfinals vs. Kalamazoo Wings 0–4
