= Fox Valley Ice Arena =

Skating arena in Geneva, Illinois

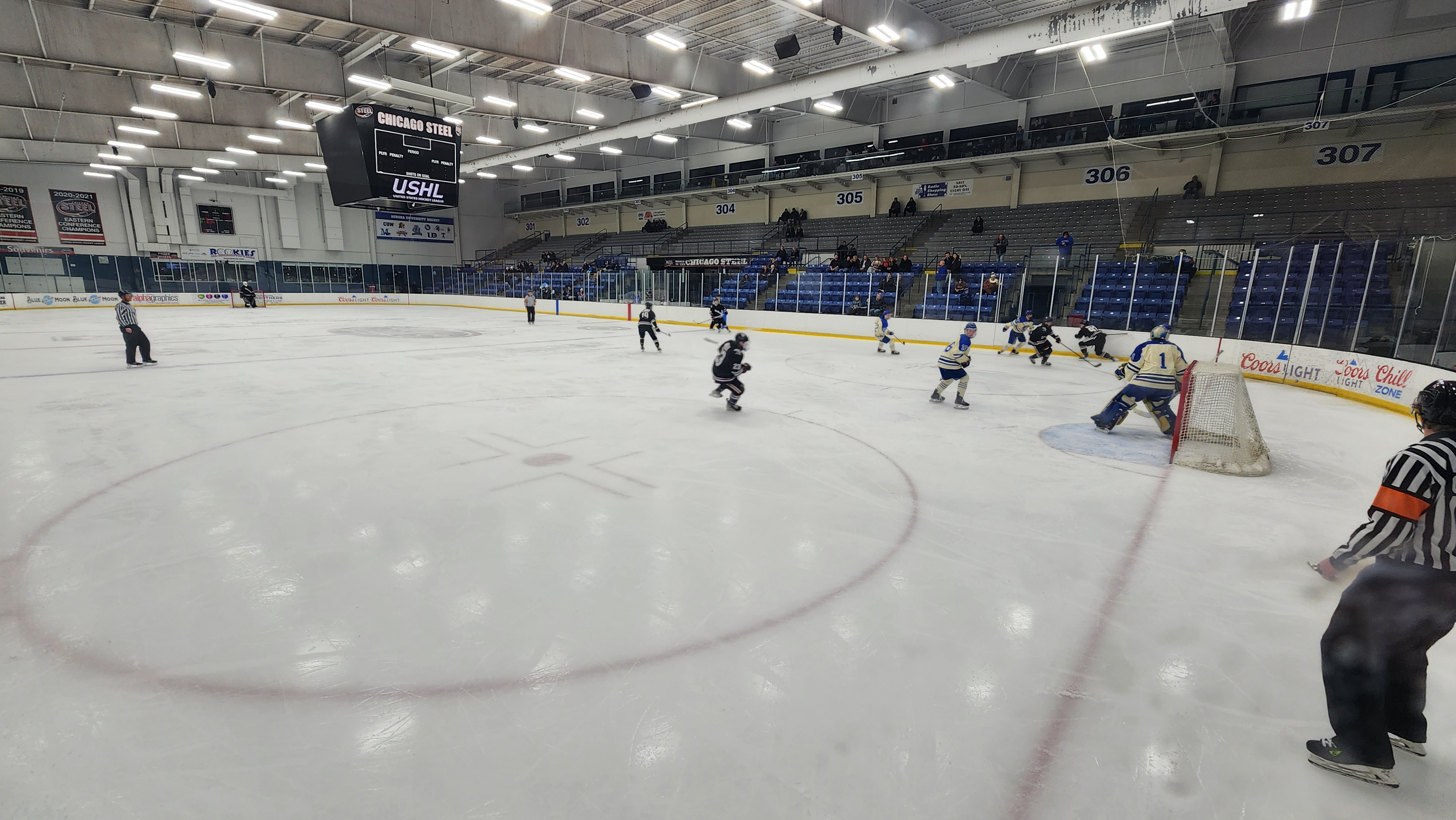
- The NHL-sized rink, the rink for the Steel from 2015 to 2026 and the current rink for the Aurora Spartans hockey team

- Location within Illinois Location within the United States
- Full name: Fox Valley Ice Arena
- Location: 1996 South Kirk Road; Geneva, Illinois
- Coordinates: 41.8729085°N 88.2801794°W

Tenants
- Chicago Freeze (NAHL) (1997–2003); Chicago Bluesmen (RHI) (1999); Chicago Hitmen (NAHL/NA3HL) (2011–2012); Chicago Steel (USHL) (2015–2026)

Fox Valley Ice Arena is a public skating facility offering basic to advanced skating lessons for both figure skating and hockey. In addition, it served as the home of the Chicago Steel of the United States Hockey League from 2015 to 2026, when the team relocated to Blackhawks Ice Center on the Near West Side, Chicago, the practice facility for the Chicago Blackhawks. Fox Valley Ice Arena contains two rinks: one measures 200' x 85' (the size of a National Hockey League rink) and the other 200' x 100' (an international-size rink). The arena is also an official rink partner of the Blackhawks. Fox Valley Ice Arena has a full service fitness facility on the premise, concessions, indoor virtual golf, and a restaurant, Rookie's Bar & Grill.

== Hockey tenants ==
The Chicago Steel moved to the Fox Valley Ice Arena in 2015, having previously played at the Edge Ice Arena in Bensenville, Illinois since their inception in 2000. They added several new features to the rink, including a new scoreboard in the main NHL rink, new will call area, and renovated the back of the rink with office facilities, etc. Prior to the renovation of the rink, it was used for home games of the Chicago Freeze, Chicago Bluesmen of Roller Hockey International and the Chicago Hitmen of the North American Hockey League and North American 3 Hockey League.

In 2025, the Chicago Steel announced they would be leaving the Fox Valley Ice Arena for Blackhawks Ice Center, the official practice facility for the Chicago Blackhawks. The Steel moved out in 2026, and currently play in USG Arena, a 2000+ seated rink on Chicago’s west side, which is the largest rink at Blackhawks Ice Center.
