= Dyer, Indiana =

- Town
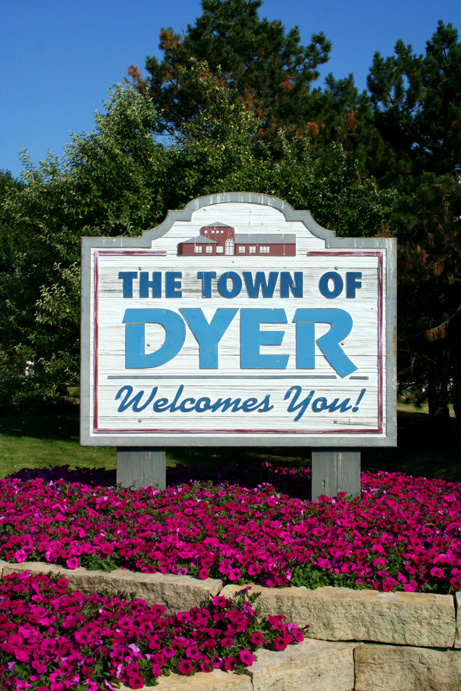

- Flag Seal
- Motto: Striving Higher in Dyer
- Location of Dyer in Lake County, Indiana.
- Coordinates: 41°30′31″N 87°30′44″W
- Country: United States
- State: Indiana
- County: Lake
- Township: St. John
- Settled: 1838
- Incorporated: January 24, 1910

Government
  - Type: Town
  - Body: Town Council
  - Members: Robert Starkey (R, 1st), Mary K Timm (R, 2nd), Jenna Ogrizovich (R, 3rd), Mary Tanis (R, 4th), Annette Ludwig (R, 5th)
  - Clerk-Treasurer: Debbie Astor (R)
  - Town Manager: David W. Hein

Area
  - Total: 6.18 sq mi (16.00 km^{2})
  - Land: 6.18 sq mi (16.00 km^{2})
  - Water: 0 sq mi (0.00 km^{2})
- Elevation: 663 ft (202 m)

Population (2020)
  - Total: 16,517
  - Density: 2,673/sq mi (1,032.1/km^{2})

Standard of living (2008-12)
- Time zone: UTC-6 (Central)
  - Summer (DST): UTC-5 (Central)
- ZIP code: 46311
- Area code: 219
- FIPS code: 18-19270
- GNIS feature ID: 2396914
- Website: www.townofdyer.com

Demographics (2010)
Demographic	Proportion
White	90.1%
Black	2.5%
Asian	2.9%
Islander	0.0%
Native	0.2%
Other	4.3%
Hispanic (any race)	9.3%

Dyer (/ˈdaɪər/ DY-ər) is a town in St. John Township, Lake County, Indiana, United States. The population was 16,517 at the 2020 census. It is a southeastern suburb of Chicago.

== Geography ==
Dyer borders Munster to the north, unincorporated St. John Township to the south, Schererville to the east, and Lynwood and Sauk Village in Illinois to the west. The Illinois state line comprises Dyer's entire western border. One of Dyer's neighborhoods, Briar Ridge, spans both Dyer and adjacent Schererville. Dyer is roughly 30 miles from downtown Chicago and 12 miles from Chicago's south side.

Dyer is built on mostly flat land with an exception being the steep sand ridge south of US Highway 30. This is the Glenwood Shoreline.

According to the 2010 census, Dyer has a total area of 6.1 square miles (15.80 km^{2}), all land.

== Demographics ==
Historical population
Census	Pop.	Note	%±
1910	545		—
1920	479		−12.1%
1930	672		40.3%
1940	976		45.2%
1950	1,556		59.4%
1960	3,993		156.6%
1970	4,906		22.9%
1980	9,555		94.8%
1990	10,923		14.3%
2000	13,895		27.2%
2010	16,390		18.0%
2020	16,517		0.8%

=== Racial and ethnic composition ===
Dyer town, Indiana – Racial and ethnic composition Note: the US Census treats Hispanic/Latino as an ethnic category. This table excludes Latinos from the racial categories and assigns them to a separate category. Hispanics/Latinos may be of any race.
Race / Ethnicity (NH = Non-Hispanic)	Pop 2000	Pop 2010	Pop 2020	% 2000	% 2010	% 2020
White alone (NH)	12,763	13,766	12,520	91.85%	83.99%	75.80%
Black or African American alone (NH)	91	403	592	0.65%	2.46%	3.58%
Native American or Alaska Native alone (NH)	18	28	14	0.13%	0.17%	0.08%
Asian alone (NH)	219	481	640	1.58%	2.93%	3.87%
Native Hawaiian or Pacific Islander alone (NH)	5	3	1	0.04%	0.02%	0.01%
Other race alone (NH)	7	13	41	0.05%	0.08%	0.25%
Mixed race or Multiracial (NH)	96	176	464	0.69%	1.07%	2.81%
Hispanic or Latino (any race)	696	1,520	2,245	5.01%	9.27%	13.59%
Total	13,895	16,390	16,517	100.00%	100.00%	100.00%

=== 2020 census ===
As of the 2020 census, Dyer had a population of 16,517. The median age was 44.6 years. 20.6% of residents were under the age of 18 and 20.7% of residents were 65 years of age or older. For every 100 females there were 95.7 males, and for every 100 females age 18 and over there were 92.6 males age 18 and over.

100.0% of residents lived in urban areas, while 0.0% lived in rural areas.

There were 6,282 households in Dyer, of which 29.4% had children under the age of 18 living in them. Of all households, 58.9% were married-couple households, 14.1% were households with a male householder and no spouse or partner present, and 22.3% were households with a female householder and no spouse or partner present. About 24.2% of all households were made up of individuals and 12.5% had someone living alone who was 65 years of age or older.

There were 6,495 housing units, of which 3.3% were vacant. The homeowner vacancy rate was 1.1% and the rental vacancy rate was 6.3%.

=== 2010 census ===
As of the census of 2010, there were 16,390 people, 5,985 households, and 4,552 families residing in the town. The population density was 2,686.9 inhabitants per square mile (1,037.4/km^{2}). There were 6,125 housing units at an average density of 1,004.1 per square mile (387.7/km^{2}). The racial makeup of the town was 90.1% White, 2.5% African American, 0.2% Native American, 2.9% Asian, 2.4% from other races, and 1.8% from two or more races. Hispanic or Latino of any race were 9.3% of the population.

There were 5,985 households, of which 33.5% had children under the age of 18 living with them, 63.8% were married couples living together, 8.4% had a female householder with no husband present, 3.9% had a male householder with no wife present, and 23.9% were non-families. 20.8% of all households were made up of individuals, and 9.7% had someone living alone who was 65 years of age or older. The average household size was 2.68 and the average family size was 3.12.

The median age in the town was 42.9 years. 23.1% of residents were under the age of 18; 7.1% were between the ages of 18 and 24; 22.9% were from 25 to 44; 31.4% were from 45 to 64; and 15.5% were 65 years of age or older. The gender makeup of the town was 48.4% male and 51.6% female.

=== Income and poverty ===
As of 2009, the median income for a household in the town was $76,599 while the mean income for a household in the town was $93,308. The median income for a family was $87,127 and the mean income for a family was $103,563. The estimated per capita income for the town was $34,275. About 0.7% of families and 1.2% of the population were estimated to be below the poverty line.

== History ==
In 1830, the first permanent white settlers came to Northwest Indiana. The earliest historical records date back to 1838. On June 1, 1855, the original plat of the town was established. Aaron Norton Hart, a settler from Philadelphia, Pennsylvania, played a key role in developing Dyer's infrastructure in the 1860s and 1870s. Hart supervised construction of roads and the implementation of a drainage ditch system, allowing agricultural and commercial use of the marshy land. Hart was killed in 1883 while working on a ditch near Plum Creek. Hart Street, one of Dyer's major north–south streets, bears his name. Hart's wife, Martha Dyer Hart, is the town's namesake.

Dyer was incorporated as a town under Indiana law on February 8, 1910. Upon incorporation, Dyer was divided into three wards: The first ward consisted of all land within town limits lying west of Hart Street; the second ward comprised the section east of Hart Street and south of Lincoln Highway; the land north of Lincoln Highway and east of Hart Street formed the third ward.

Meyer's Castle was listed in the National Register of Historic Places in 1984.

== Transportation ==
=== Roads ===
Dyer's primary arterial road is U.S. Route 30/Lincoln Highway, which runs east–west through the town. A 1.3-mile (2.1 km) stretch of this route traversing Dyer and Schererville was considered one of the most prominent Seedling Mile projects on the Lincoln Highway when it was constructed in the early 1920s, and came to be known as the highway's "Ideal Section." It remains in use to this day.

=== Amtrak ===
Amtrak, the national passenger rail system, provides service to Dyer at the Dyer Amtrak Station. The station is served by the Cardinal with service to Chicago Union Station and New York Penn Station via Washington Union Station.

=== South Shore Line ===
Dyer commuters to Chicago are served by Munster/Dyer station, a South Shore Line rail station in Munster, Indiana. It opened on March 31, 2026. The main station and parking lots are in Munster while overflow parking is in Dyer.

== Education ==
Dyer is located in the Lake Central School Corporation. Public high school students living in Dyer attend Lake Central High School located in St. John, Indiana. Three of the system's schools are located within Dyer town limits: Kahler Middle School, Protsman Elementary School, and Bibich Elementary School.

Private schools in Dyer include Protestant Reformed Christian School and Illiana Christian High School.

Mid-America Reformed Seminary is a theological institution located in Dyer.

== Sports ==
Dyer was home to the Chi-Town Shooters, a former minor league professional ice hockey team that was a member of the All American Hockey League. The team's home arena was Midwest Training & Ice Center.
