= Wooster Korn Kings =

- City: Wooster, Ohio
- League: All American Hockey League
- Founded: 2010
- Home arena: Alice Noble Ice Arena
- Colors: Green & Yellow
- Owner: League Owned
- General manager: Chuck Harrison
- Head coach: Chuck Harrison

Franchise history
- 2009-2010: Madison Ice Muskies
- 2010: Wooster Korn Kings

Championships
- Regular season titles: 0
- Playoff championships: 0

The Wooster Korn Kings were a professional hockey team based in Wooster, Ohio. The Korn Kings were a member of the All American Hockey League and played their home games at Alice Noble Ice Arena in Wooster, OH. The team abruptly folded after two weeks of play.

== Team history ==
The Wooster Korn Kings started their inaugural season in 2009 as the Madison Ice Muskies, located in Madison, Wisconsin. In October 2010, the team was relocated to Wooster, Ohio. They changed their name to the Wooster Korn Kings. The troubled franchise did not last long in the much smaller Wooster market, folding after just a bit more than a month after relocating.

== Season-by-season record ==
=== Madison Ice Muskies ===
Season	GP	W	L	OL	SL	PTS	GF	GA	Standing	Playoff Result
2009-10	24	12	9	1	2	27	106	118	5th	ceased operations January 16, 2010

=== Wooster Korn Kings ===
Season	GP	W	L	OTL	SOL	PTS	GF	GA	Place	Playoff Result
2010-11	5	2	3	0	0	4	22	24	6th	foled November 17, 2010
