= Evansville IceMen =

- City: Evansville, Indiana
- League: ECHL
- Conference: Western
- Division: Midwest
- Founded: 1992; 34 years ago (In the CoHL)
- Operated: 2010–2016; 10 years ago
- Home arena: Ford Center
- Colors: black, navy, white
- Owner(s): Ron Geary
- Head coach: Al Sims
- Captain: Jarret Lukin
- Media: ESPN Radio
- Website: Evansville IceMen.com

Franchise history
- 1992–2008: Muskegon Fury
- 2008–2010: Muskegon Lumberjacks
- 2010–2016: Evansville IceMen
- 2017–present: Jacksonville Icemen

The Evansville IceMen were a minor league ice hockey team in the ECHL in Evansville, Indiana. The franchise was originally a member of the United Hockey League before it merged into the Central Hockey League in 2010. The franchise won four post-season championship titles in the UHL in 1999, 2002, 2004 and 2005. The franchise played one season at Swonder Ice Arena before moving to the Ford Center beginning in the 2011–12 season.

The IceMen were formerly known as the Muskegon Fury from 1992 to 2008, and Muskegon Lumberjacks from 2008 to 2010. The IceMen franchise replaced the original Evansville IceMen that were a part of the All American Hockey League before folding in 2010.

The franchise went dormant after the 2015–16 season and were replaced at the Ford Center by the Evansville Thunderbolts in the Southern Professional Hockey League. The IceMen franchise had ECHL approval to relocate to Owensboro, Kentucky, pending a complete renovation of the Owensboro Sportscenter. However, the team's ownership was unable to obtain the financing for the renovations and the deal with Owensboro was voided in September 2016. In January 2017, part of the franchise was sold to an ownership group based out of Jacksonville, Florida, and approved by the league on February 8. The league announced it would return to play in the 2017–18 season and became the Jacksonville Icemen.

== History ==
On February 8, 2010, it was announced that the Muskegon Lumberjacks would move to Evansville, Indiana as the Evansville IceMen at the conclusion of the 2009–10 International Hockey League season, replacing the team with the same name, and played their home games at Swonder Ice Arena. The United States Hockey League would then award an expansion team to Muskegon taking on the name Muskegon Lumberjacks.

On July 13, 2010, the International Hockey League merged with the Central Hockey League, retaining the name Central Hockey League. The merger had the Bloomington PrairieThunder, Dayton Gems, Evansville IceMen, Fort Wayne Komets and Quad City Mallards IHL franchises move to the Northern Conference of the CHL.

In 2011, the IceMen moved their home games to the new Ford Center in Evansville, playing in the inaugural event for the arena.

On May 17, 2012, the IceMen were formally accepted into the ECHL, with membership to begin in the 2012–13 season. On June 15, 2012, the IceMen announced an affiliation with the NHL's Columbus Blue Jackets and its primary AHL affiliate, the Springfield Falcons. Before the resumption of the new season on August 30, 2012, the Peoria Rivermen announced that the IceMen would be their ECHL farm club, cutting ties with the Alaska Aces.

The IceMen announced on June 5, 2014, that they had hired Dwight Mullins as the new head coach and was joined by former IceMen player Josh Beaulieu as assistant coach. Prior to the 2014–15 season, the IceMen agreed to a new affiliation contract with the Ottawa Senators and their AHL affiliate, the Binghamton Senators, after losing their Blue Jackets affiliation. In January 2015, Mullins was replaced by Al Sims due to a poor start to the season (9–16–4).

On November 16, 2015, team owner Ron Geary wrote a letter to the IceMen fans that the team's operating lease with the Ford Center was ending after the 2015–16 season. Despite attempts to negotiate a lease extension with the city since February 2015, the two parties had not yet come to an agreement on new terms with the upcoming December 1 deadline (later extended to Dec. 15 and then again to January 6 when the 15th deadline was not met). Evansville had been reported to have been paying the highest rent in the ECHL since moving to the Ford Center in 2011, with as much as $650,000 per season compared to the league median of about $152,000. The City of Evansville and Geary were unable to come to an agreement before the final ECHL deadline and Geary began relocation discussions with the City of Owensboro, Kentucky. On January 19, it was announced that Geary had agreed to terms with Owensboro and intended to relocate the team to the Owensboro Sportscenter if the IceMen were forced to leave the Ford Center. On February 8, 2016, the City of Evansville announced that it had secured an expansion team in the Southern Professional Hockey League to play at the Ford Center beginning in the 2016–17 season, thus displacing the IceMen franchise from Evansville. Finally, on March 14, the IceMen and the ECHL announced the franchise's relocation to Owensboro has been approved but the franchise would have to go dormant for the 2016–17 season to allow time for the necessary renovations on the Owensboro Sportscenter to be completed. However, by September 2016, Geary still had not taken over management of the Sportscenter and the City of Owensboro announced a different management company would take over the Sportscenter on October 1. On the September 30 deadline, Geary sent a letter to Mayor Ron Payne stating he would not be purchasing the Sportscenter because of too much cost to convert and refurbish the arena.

In January 2017, Geary sold the sold part of the franchise to an ownership group based out of Jacksonville, Florida, and the relocation was approved by the ECHL on February 8, 2017. Geary remained as the primary owner.

== Seasons ==
Overview of Evansville IceMen seasons
League	Season	GP	W	L	OTL	SOL	Pts	GF	GA	PIM	Playoffs
Central Hockey League	2010–11	66	21	32	8	5	55	181	242	1240	Did not qualify
Central Hockey League	2011–12	66	40	22	1	3	84	215	192	1390	Lost 1st Round, 0–4 vs. Missouri Mavericks
ECHL	2012–13	72	25	40	3	4	57	207	272	1256	Did not qualify
ECHL	2013–14	72	31	30	4	7	73	226	237	1059	Did not qualify
ECHL	2014–15	72	15	48	6	3	39	169	271	1184	Did not qualify
ECHL	2015–16	72	29	33	7	3	68	207	242	1028	Did not qualify

== See also ==
- Sports in Evansville
