= Queen City Storm =

- City: Evendale, Ohio
- League: All American Hockey League
- Founded: 2010
- Home arena: Sports Plus Cincinnati
- Colors: Blue & Gold
- Owner(s): Nantucket Promotions LLC.

Franchise history
- 2010–2011: Queen City Storm

Championships
- Regular season titles: 0
- Playoff championships: 0

The Queen City Storm were a professional hockey team based in Evendale, Ohio, a Cincinnati suburb. The Storm were members of the All American Hockey League and played their home games at Sports Plus Cincinnati.

== History ==
The Storm were approved for membership in the AAHL in August 2010. The Storm suspended operations mid-season in January 2011 with some its players being sent to play for the Michigan Moose.

== Season by-season record ==
Season	GP	W	L	OTL	SOL	PTS	GF	GA	Place	Playoff Result
2010-11	17	5	10	1	1	12	54	83	5th	foled on January 2
