= Great Lakes Hockey League (adult) =

Adult ice hockey league

- Great Lakes Hockey League
- Sport: Ice hockey
- Founded: 1937
- First season: 1937-38
- Commissioner: Pete Krueger
- No. of teams: 10
- Country: United States
- Most recent champion: Portage Lake Pioneers (2026)
- Website: theglhl.com

The Great Lakes Hockey League (GLHL) is an elite amateur full contact ice hockey league that is affiliated with USA Hockey. Players must be at least 18 years of age and many have previous NCAA College, Junior A, or Professional hockey experience. There are currently 10 teams in the league. The teams are all based in Wisconsin and the Upper Peninsula of Michigan. Each team plays two games against every other team in the league.

== History ==
The league was formed in 1937 as the Badger State Hockey League.

The 1998-99 Portage Lake Pioneers hold the record for best regular season at 25–1. They also went undefeated in the playoffs and national championships.

GLHL added a tenth team in the Marquette Iron Rangers, who began play during the 2015–16 season. The club played just one season, before they were replaced by the Marquette Mutineers in the fall of 2016.

In 2018 the Monroe Blues ceased operations, followed by the West Bend Bombers in 2022, and the Marquette Mutineers in 2024.

In 2024 the league announced three new expansion teams: the Dane County Dairy Kings, the M&M Shamrocks (Marinette and Menominee), and the Sun Prairie Killer Bees (formerly of the American Premier Hockey League).

The Dane County Dairy Kings would cease operations in 2025. The Sun Prairie Killer Bees moved to McFarland, WI, in 2026; while the Milwaukee Timberwolves would join the league.

=== League format ===
The league is made up of 10 teams that play a 18-game schedule running from October to March. Each GLHL game consists of three 20-minute periods. If the game is tied after regulation, there is a five-minute overtime, and if still tied, a four-round shootout.

Following the regular season is the playoff tournament. Teams are seeded in three pools based on regular season standings. Teams play one game against each team in their pool. The team with the best record in each pool advances to the semi-final. Of the remaining teams, the team with the greatest goal differential in pool play advances to the semi-finals as the wild card. In the event all teams in the same pool finish with a 1–1 record, the team with the greatest goal differential will advance to the semi-finals. The winners of the two semi-final games play for the championship. In the event a game is tied after overtime, additional overtime periods will be played until there is a winner.

== Tournaments ==
=== Gibson Cup ===
Annual three-game series between long-time Michigan rivals Calumet Wolverines and the Portage Lake Pioneers. Named in honor of "Doc" Jack Gibson, the Gibson Cup was first awarded in 1939; it is the third oldest hockey trophy in the United States.

=== Keevin Cup ===
An annual four-team pre-season tournament hosted by the Fond du Lac Bears, the Keevin Cup honors Kevin Ristau, a long-time club board member and ambassador. The tournament takes place in late October.

Year	Winner	Runner-up	Result
2010	Fond du Lac Bears	Vernon Hills Capitals	5-4 (OT)
2011	Vernon Hills Capitals	Fond du Lac Bears	
2012	Fond du Lac Bears		
2013	Fond du Lac Bears	Fox Cities Ice Dogs	7-6
2014	Fond du Lac Bears	Fox Cities Ice Dogs	7-2
2015	Fond du Lac Bears	Marquette Iron Rangers	13-5
2016	Fond du Lac Bears	Fox Cities Ice Dogs	10-7
2017	West Bend Bombers	Fond du Lac Bears	
2018	West Bend Bombers	Fond du Lac Bears	2-1
2019	West Bend Bombers	Fond du Lac Bears	3-2
2021	Fond du Lac Bears	West Bend Bombers	
2022	Fond du Lac Bears	Fox Cities Ice Dogs	

=== Paper Cup ===
An annual competition between the Fox Cities Ice Dogs and the Mosinee Papermakers. The winner is determined by whichever team wins the most head to head matches against one another (goal differential is a factor). The Cup gets its name from the two teams' cities' deep roots in the paper industry.

=== River Cup Series ===
The River Cup Series is a two game series between the Eagle River Falcons and the Mosinee Papermakers. The Cup is awarded to the team that holds the greater goal differential at the end of both games.

== Teams ==
Eagle River Falcons	1930
Mosinee Papermakers	1930
Fond du Lac Bears	1934
Calumet Wolverines	1937
Portage Lake Pioneers	1937
De Pere Deacons	1977
Fox Cities Ice Dogs	2002
McFarland Killer Bees	2024
M&M Shamrocks	2024
Milwaukee Timberwolves	2026

=== Former teams ===
- Wausau Cyclones (1972-1999)
- Milwaukee Flyers (?-2005)
- Kenosha Knights (2005–07)
- Waupun Wolves (2001–09)
- Oregon Stampede (2009–10)
- Green Bay Hornets (2010–11)
- Brookfield Battalion (2010–12)
- Oregon Outlaws (2010–12)
- Vernon Hills Capitals (2008–13)
- Madison Blues (2008-2014)
- Madison Capitols (2003-2004)
- Marquette Iron Rangers (2015–16)
- Monroe Blues (2014–18)
- Stoughton Steel (2004-07)
- West Bend Bombers (2007-22)
- Marquette Mutineers (2016-24)
- Dane County Dairy Kings (2024-2025)

== Champions ==
Season	Magnuson Cup (regular season winner)	Don Kohlman Cup (playoff champion)
2009-10	Fond du Lac Bears	Calumet Wolverines
2010-11	Vernon Hills Capitals	Mosinee Papermakers
2011-12	Vernon Hills Capitals	Fond du Lac Bears
2012-13	Portage Lake Pioneers	Eagle River Falcons
2013-14	West Bend Bombers	Fond du Lac Bears
2014-15	West Bend Bombers	Portage Lake Pioneers
2015-16	West Bend Bombers	Portage Lake Pioneers
2016-17	West Bend Bombers	Mosinee Papermakers
2017-18	Calumet Wolverines	West Bend Bombers
2018-19	Calumet Wolverines	Fox Cities Ice Dogs
2019-20	Mosinee Papermakers	None
2020-21	None	De Pere Deacons
2021-22	Eagle River Falcons	Fox Cities Ice Dogs
2022-23	Fond du Lac Bears	Mosinee Papermakers
2023-24	Portage Lake Pioneers	Fond du Lac Bears
2024-25	Portage Lake Pioneers	Portage Lake Pioneers
2025-26	Portage Lake Pioneers	Portage Lake Pioneers
