= Indiana Blizzard =

- City: Dyer, Indiana
- League: All American Hockey League
- Founded: 2009
- Home arena: Midwest Training & Ice Center Arena
- Colors: Black, Light Blue, White
- Head coach: Sergei Kharin

Franchise history
- 2009: Detroit Hitmen
- 2009–2010: West Michigan Blizzard
- 2010–2011: Indiana Blizzard

Championships
- Regular season titles: 0
- Playoff championships: 0

The Indiana Blizzard was a professional ice hockey team based in Dyer, Indiana. The team was a member of the All American Hockey League and began its inaugural season in October 2009 as the Detroit Hitmen. The Blizzard played their home games at the Midwest Training & Ice Center Arena.

== History ==
The West Michigan Blizzard started their inaugural season in October 2009 as the Detroit Hitmen, located in Fraser, Michigan. Due to the financial issues, the team was relocated to Norton Shores, Michigan on December 17, 2009. Matt Wiedenhoeft was the founding partner of the Hitmen, who orchestrated the relocation to the Muskegon, Michigan's L.C. Walker Arena. Their name was changed to the West Michigan Blizzard.

In September 2010, the team announced their relocation to Dyer, Indiana due to the inability for a new ice arena to get built in Norton Shores. After the relocation, the team changed their name to the Indiana Blizzard. Their new arena was at the Midwest Ice Center. Despite their new home, the team ceased operations by the end of 2010.

== Season-by-season record ==
Season	GP	W	L	OTL	SL	PTS	GF	GA	Season Standing	Playoff Result
2010–11	11	5	4	2	00	12	44	60	N/A	ceased operations December 29, 2010

Glossary: GP= Games played, W= Wins, L= Losses, OTL= Over Time Losses, SL= Shootout Losses, PTS= Points, PCT= Winning Percentage, GF= Goals For, GA= Goals Against, PIM= Penalty Minutes

== Roster ==
Forwards
#		Player	Pos.	Shoots	Height	Weight	Place of Birth
4	(United States)	Ryan Webb	F	R	5 ft 10 in	180 lb.	Roseville, Michigan, United States
5	(United States)	Zachary Kane	F	R			Jamestown, New York, United States
7	(United States)	Greg Eggelston	F	R	5 ft 8 in	200 lb.	Indianapolis, Indiana, United States
8	(United States)	Jose Vasquez	F	R	6 ft 3 in	205 lb.	Shelby Township, Michigan, United States
98	(United States)	Roger Recsh	F	R	7 ft 1 in	220 lb.	Sheboygan, Wisconsin, United States
11	(United States)	Andrew Sanders	F	L	6 ft 1 in	200 lb.	Salem, Oregon, United States
12	(United States)	Charles Harvey	F	R	6 ft 0 in	175 lb.	Columbus, Ohio, United States
17	(United States)	Peter Pritchett	F	R	6 ft 3 in	225 lb.	Ann Arbor, Michigan, United States
20	(United States)	Scott O'Connor	F	R	5 ft 9 in	180 lb.	Marysville, Michigan, United States
25	(United States)	Bill Vitale	F	R	5 ft 10 in	175 lb.	Laurel Springs, New Jersey, United States

Defensemen
#		Player	Pos.	Shoots	Height	Weight	Place of Birth
2	(United States)	B.J. Belliotti	D	L	5 ft 9 in	180 lb.	Waterford, Michigan, United States
18	(United States)	Emory Lovse	D	R	5 ft 9 in	165 lb.	Grand Rapids, Michigan, United States
19	(United States)	Bradley Bohlinger	D	R	5 ft 11 in	190 lb.	St. Clair Shores, Michigan, United States
22	(United States)	Ryan Sexsmith	D	R	5 ft 11 in	210 lb.	Dearborn, Michigan, United States
23	(United States)	Matt Mosley	D	R	5 ft 10 in	190 lb.	Trenton, Michigan, United States
24	(United States)	Brett Aimone	D	R	6 ft 0 in	200 lb.	Toms River, New Jersey, United States
51	(United States)	Dan Olesky	D	R	5 ft 11 in	230 lb.	Chesterfield, Michigan, United States

Goaltenders
#		Player	Pos.	Catches	Height	Weight	Place of Birth
1	(Canada)	Matt Kinsella	G	R			Toronto, Ontario, Canada
74	(United States)	Nortan Ali	G	L	5 ft 6 in	160 lb.	Ferndale, Michigan, United States
