= Detroit Dragons =

- City: Fraser, Michigan
- Founded: 2008
- Colors: Black & Red
- Owners: M&M Holding Unlimited LLC
- General manager: Tim Mitchell, Matt Mitchell
- Head coach: Steve Shannon

Championships
- Regular season titles: 0

The Detroit Dragons were an All American Hockey League team based in Fraser, Michigan, which played for part of the 2008–2009 season. Their home rink was Great Lakes Sports City in Fraser. Originally known as the Motor City Gamblers, the team was initially formed as a franchise of the Midwest Hockey League.

On December 20, 2008, the Detroit Dragons played their final game under Coach Steve Shannon at Battle Creek, with a league-best 10–3–0–0 record. The Dragons subsequently folded due to financial problems and ceded control to the All American Hockey League, which found other players to compete under the team name before dispersing its assets.
