= Chicago Blaze (ice hockey) =

Ice hockey team in Rolling Meadows, Illinois

- City: Rolling Meadows, Illinois
- League: All American Hockey League
- Founded: 2008
- Home arena: West Meadows Ice Arena
- Colors: Blue, Black
- General manager: Aaron Mattey
- Head coach: Steve Pronger

Franchise history
- 2008–2009: Chicago Blaze

Championships
- Regular season titles: 0

The Chicago Blaze was a professional ice hockey team based in Rolling Meadows, Illinois. The team was part of the All American Hockey League (AAHL) and began playing in the 2008–2009 AAHL season. The Blaze played their home games at West Meadows Ice Arena in Rolling Meadows, Illinois. The Blaze were coached by Steve Pronger, a former assistant coach for the Flint Generals.

== Seasons ==
| Season | Games | Won | Lost | TOTL | SOL | Points | Goals for | Goals against | Standing |
|---|---|---|---|---|---|---|---|---|---|
| 2008-2009 | 18 | 12 | 6 | 0 | 0 | 24 | 83 | 65 | folded, AAHL |
