= Battle Creek Revolution =

- City: Battle Creek, Michigan
- League: All American Hockey League
- Founded: 2008
- Folded: 2011
- Home arena: Revolution Arena
- Colors: Blue & Red
- Owner(s): Revolution Advertising LLC.
- General manager: David Hahn
- Head coach: Bob Clouston

Franchise history
- 2007–2008: Valley Forge Freedom
- 2008–2011: Battle Creek Revolution

Championships
- Regular season titles: 1 (2010–11)
- Playoff championships: 1 (2010–11)

The Battle Creek Revolution was a professional ice hockey team which played in the All American Hockey League. The team played its home games at Revolution Arena in Battle Creek, Michigan. The team was initially announced to play in the Mid-Atlantic Hockey League for the 2008–09 season before the league folded in August 2008.

The organization also created a junior hockey team called the Battle Creek Jr. Revolution that played its first season in the North American 3 Hockey League in the 2010–11 season.

== Season-by-season results ==
Season	GP	W	L	OTL	SOL	Pts	GF	GA	Finish	Playoffs
2008–09	60	36	19	4	1	77	318	299	2nd, AAHL	Lost in Championship Game
2009–10	46	23	18	0	5	51	236	227	2nd, AAHL	Lost in Playoffs
2010–11	24	20	4	0	0	40	152	69	1st, AAHL	Won Championship

== 2010–11 roster ==
Forwards
#		Player	Pos.	Shoots	Height	Weight	Place of Birth
7	(United States)	Ky Moje	F		5' 10"	165 lbs.	Minneapolis, Minnesota, United States
11	(United States)	Darren Seid	F		5' 10"	210 lbs.	Great Neck, New York, United States
14	(United States)	Chris Affinati	F	L	5' 8"	170 lbs.	Highland Park, Illinois, United States
16	(Canada)	Jason Dolgy	F	R	6' 1"	190 lbs.	Montreal, Quebec, Canada
20	(United States)	Aaron Schwartz	LW	L	5' 11"	205 lbs.	Riverwoods, Illinois, United States
21	(United States)	Matt Kopke	F		6' 2"	205 lbs.	Alanson, Michigan, United States
22	(Canada)	Shawn McNulty	LW	R	6' 0"	195 lbs.	Campbell River, British Columbia, Canada
24	(Canada)	Dan Kohanchuk	F	L	5' 11"	175 lbs.	Winnipeg, Manitoba, Canada
67	(United States)	Ryan Bond	C	L	5' 11"	160 lbs.	Northville, Michigan, United States
89	(Japan)	Hironori Kobayashi	F		6' 0"	190 lbs.	Tomakomai, Japan

Defensemen
#		Player	Pos.	Shoots	Height	Weight	Place of Birth
4	(United States)	Vinny Geonetti	D		6' 1"	195 lbs.	Philadelphia, Pennsylvania, United States
9	(Japan) (Canada)	Nobumasa Kinugasa	D	L	5' 11"	180 lbs.	Tokyo, Japan
10	(Canada)	Rob Schweyer	D	R	6' 0"	189 lbs.	Simcoe, Ontario, Canada
13	(United States)	Ryan Huggett	D	R	5' 11"	185 lbs.	Battle Creek, Michigan, United States
17	(United States)	Nick Williams	D	R	6' 1"	195 lbs.	Davison, Michigan, United States
27	(United States)	Brett Aimone	D	R	5' 11"	195 lbs.	Toms River, New Jersey, United States

Goaltenders
#		Player	Pos.	Catches	Height	Weight	Place of Birth
51	(Canada)	Matt Kinsella	G	R	5' 9"	175 lbs.	Toronto, Ontario, Canada
53	(Slovakia)	Vlado Neumann	G		5' 8"	143 lbs.	Bratislava, Slovakia
