= All American Hockey League (2008–2011) =

- All American Hockey League
- Sport: Ice hockey
- Founded: 2008
- Folded: 2011
- No. of teams: 2
- Country: United States
- Last champion: Battle Creek Revolution
- Website: aahlhockey.com

The All American Hockey League (AAHL) was a lower level professional ice hockey league with teams in the Midwestern United States. The league suspended operations for the 2011–12 season and subsequently folded.

== League history ==
=== Inaugural season (2008–09) ===
The All American Hockey League was formed in 2008 as the All American Hockey Association when the Battle Creek Revolution and South Shore Shooters (later the Chi-Town Shooters) of the Mid-Atlantic Hockey League banded together with the Evansville IceMen and Motor City Gamblers (later the Detroit Dragons) of the Midwest Hockey League.

The Detroit Dragons folded mid-season, with the Chicago Blaze joining weeks later to fill the void. (The Blaze were originally going to be an expansion franchise for the 2009–10 season.)

On April 5, 2009, the Chi-Town Shooters became the first team to win the Champions Cup by defeating the Battle Creek Revolution in the best-of-five championship series.

On April 14, 2009, the AAHA Board of Directors announced a reorganization from an association format to a league format. This resulted in the All American Hockey Association being renamed the All American Hockey League.

=== Second season (2009–10) ===
On August 10, 2009, the AAHL announced a merger with the still-unlaunched Midwest Hockey League, absorbing the MWHL's Madison Ice Muskies as well as key MWHL personnel. The merged leagues continued under the AAHL name.

During the season, the Madison Ice Muskies and Chicago Blaze ceased operations due to financial problems. Also, the expansion Detroit Hitmen moved west to Muskegon, Michigan mid-season, and were re-christened the West Michigan Blizzard.

On April 15, 2010, the Evansville IceMen won the AAHL's Rod Davidson Cup (originally "Champions Cup" during the inaugural AAHA season) by beating the West Michigan Blizzard four games to one.

=== Third season (2010–11) ===
In June 2010, the IceMen AAHL franchise suspended operations when Evansville acquired a franchise in the CHL.

In August 2010, it was announced that the Madison Ice Muskies would be reinstated in the AAHL.

In August 2010, it was also announced that the Queen City Storm were approved for membership in the AAHL as an expansion team.

The Chi-Town Shooters left the league in August 2010 with plans to join a junior hockey league for the 2011–12 season.

In August 2010, the AAHL granted an expansion team to Lapeer, Michigan. A contest decided that Lapeer's team would be named the Lapeer Loggers.

On August 31, 2010, the Troy Bruins were officially announced as the sixth expansion team in the 2010–11 season.

In September 2010, the West Michigan Blizzard relocated to Dyer, Indiana, and were renamed the Indiana Blizzard.

On October 27, 2010, the Madison Ice Muskies moved to Wooster, Ohio, and became the Wooster Korn Kings. On November 17, 2010, the Korn Kings were taken over by the league and ceased operations.

On December 29, 2010, it was announced that the Indiana Blizzard were ceasing operations and the Chi-Town Shooters were returning for the remainder of the season, taking over all the Blizzard's players, as well as their current record. Despite keeping the "Chi-Town" moniker, they were based in Dyer, Indiana, instead of Chicago.

On January 3, 2011, the Lapeer Loggers were taken over by the league. Within days, the Bruins and Storm both ceased operations. Players from these three teams were brought together under the name Michigan Moose. The Moose, coached by AAHL commissioner Rod Davidson, were based in Battle Creek and played their home games in Revolution Arena, the same arena as the rival Battle Creek Revolution.

In February 2011, the Moose ceased operations.

In March 2011, the Battle Creek Revolution won their first Rod Davidson Cup.

== Affiliations ==
Over the course of the league's history, various All American Hockey League teams have had affiliations with the ECHL (higher affiliate), IHL (higher affiliate), CHL (higher affiliate), and Greater Metro Junior A Hockey League (lower affiliate).

== Teams year-by-year ==
Year	Teams	Expansion	Defunct	Suspended	Return from hiatus	Relocated	Name changes
2008-09	5	Battle Creek Revolution; Chicago Blaze; Chi-Town Shooters; Evansville IceMen; Detroit Dragons	Detroit Dragons				Motor City Gamblers → Detroit Dragons; South Shore Shooters → Chi-Town Shooters
2009-10	6	Detroit Hitmen; Madison Ice Muskies	Chicago Blaze	Madison Ice Muskies, Chi-Town Shooters		Detroit Hitmen → Norton Shores, Michigan	Detroit Hitmen → West Michigan Blizzard
2010-11	6	Queen City Storm; Lapeer Loggers; Troy Bruins; Michigan Moose	Evansville IceMen; Wooster Korn Kings; Indiana Blizzard; Queen City Storm; Troy Bruins; Madison Ice Muskies; Michigan Moose		Madison Ice Muskies, Chi-Town Shooters	West Michigan Blizzard → Dyer, Indiana; Madison Ice Muskies → Wooster, Ohio; Indiana Blizzard → Chicago, IL; Lapeer Loggers → Battle Creek, MI	West Michigan Blizzard → Indiana Blizzard; Madison Ice Muskies → Wooster Korn Kings; Indiana Blizzard → Chi-Town Shooters; Lapeer Loggers → Michigan Moose

=== Timeline ===
member not member

== Rod Davidson Cup ==
The Rod Davidson Cup was awarded to the annual playoff champion. It was known as the "Champions Cup" during the inaugural AAHA season, with the name change coming during the league's first season operating as the AAHL.

The winners were:

- 2009 – Chi-Town Shooters
- 2010 – Evansville IceMen
- 2011 – Battle Creek Revolution

== Hockey Hall of Fame ==
On February 14, 2009, Kira Hurley of the Evansville IceMen became the first female goalie to register a point in a men's professional game. Because of this achievement, Kira is featured in the Hockey Hall of Fame in Toronto, Ontario, Canada. Kira's game memorabilia (goalie stick and game-worn jersey) is on permanent display in the minor league section of the Hockey Hall of Fame, along with the official scoresheet from the historic game.

== Individual trophies and awards ==
Award	Description	2009/2010 holder
Coach of the Year	Awarded to the league's best coach	Bob Clouston; Battle Creek Revolution
Executive of the Year	Awarded to the league's best executive	Bill and Sandy Vitale; West Michigan Blizzard
Equipment Manager of the Year	Awarded to the league's best equipment manager	Jeremy "JBone" Holloway; West Michigan Blizzard
League MVP	Awarded to the league's most valuable player	Cameron Sault; West Michigan Blizzard
Defensive Player of the Year	Awarded to the league's best defensive player	Rob Schweyer; Battle Creek Revolution
Goaltender of the Year	Awarded to the league's best goaltender	John Dorman; Evansville IceMen

== See also ==
- List of ice hockey leagues
