= National Register of Historic Places listings in Vernon County, Missouri =

Location of Vernon County in Missouri

This is a list of the National Register of Historic Places listings in Vernon County, Missouri.

This is intended to be a complete list of the properties and districts on the National Register of Historic Places in Vernon County, Missouri, United States. Latitude and longitude coordinates are provided for many National Register properties and districts; these locations may be seen together in a map.

There are 8 properties and districts listed on the National Register in the county, including 1 National Historic Landmark.

This National Park Service list is complete through NPS recent listings posted September 26, 2025.

== Current listings ==
| | Name on the Register | Image | Date listed | Location | City or town | Description |
|---|---|---|---|---|---|---|
| 1 | Brown Archeological Site | | February 12, 1971 (#71000480) | Address Restricted | Fair Haven | An Osage village site during the period when fur trade with Europeans was important |
| 2 | Carrington Osage Village Site | Carrington Osage Village Site | October 15, 1966 (#66000425) | Osage Village State Historic Site; 37°58′52″N 94°12′35″W | Nevada | An Osage village site during the period when fur trade with Europeans was important |
| 3 | Coal Pit Archeological Site | | February 12, 1971 (#71000479) | Address Restricted | Arthur | Also known as the "Hayes Site"; an Osage village site during the period when fur trade with Europeans was important |
| 4 | Halleys Bluff Site | | July 24, 1974 (#74001091) | Address Restricted | Schell City | |
| 5 | Infirmary Building, Missouri State Hospital Number 3 | Infirmary Building, Missouri State Hospital Number 3 | November 25, 2005 (#05001330) | 2095 N. Ash St. 37°51′38″N 94°21′33″W | Nevada | |
| 6 | Prairie View Stock Farm | | September 8, 2015 (#15000573) | Missouri Route WW; 38°03′15″N 94°27′50″W | Rich Hill | |
| 7 | Vernon County Courthouse | Vernon County Courthouse | June 27, 1997 (#97000630) | Bounded by Cherry, Cedar, Walnut, and Main Sts. 37°50′25″N 94°21′29″W | Nevada | |
| 8 | Vernon County Jail, Sheriff's House and Office | Vernon County Jail, Sheriff's House and Office | August 16, 1977 (#77000816) | 229 N. Main St. 37°50′22″N 94°21′17″W | Nevada | |

== See also ==
- List of National Historic Landmarks in Missouri
- National Register of Historic Places listings in Missouri
