= Aikinsville, Missouri =

Unincorporated community in Missouri, U.S.

Coordinates: 38°33′29″N 92°50′11″W

Aikinsville (also spelled Akinsville) is an unincorporated community in Morgan County, in the U.S. state of Missouri.

== History ==
A post office called Akinsville was established in 1880, and remained in operation until 1920. The community derives its name from Reverend Shannon Akins, who owned the land where the village is located.

From 1885 to 1889, young Baptist preacher Sidney Abram Weltmer founded and operated the Akinsville Normal School here, training teachers for elementary schools. He later moved to Nevada, Missouri, where he became known for the Weltmer Institute of Suggestive Therapeutics, a controversial system of healing.
