= Wooster, Ohio =

- City
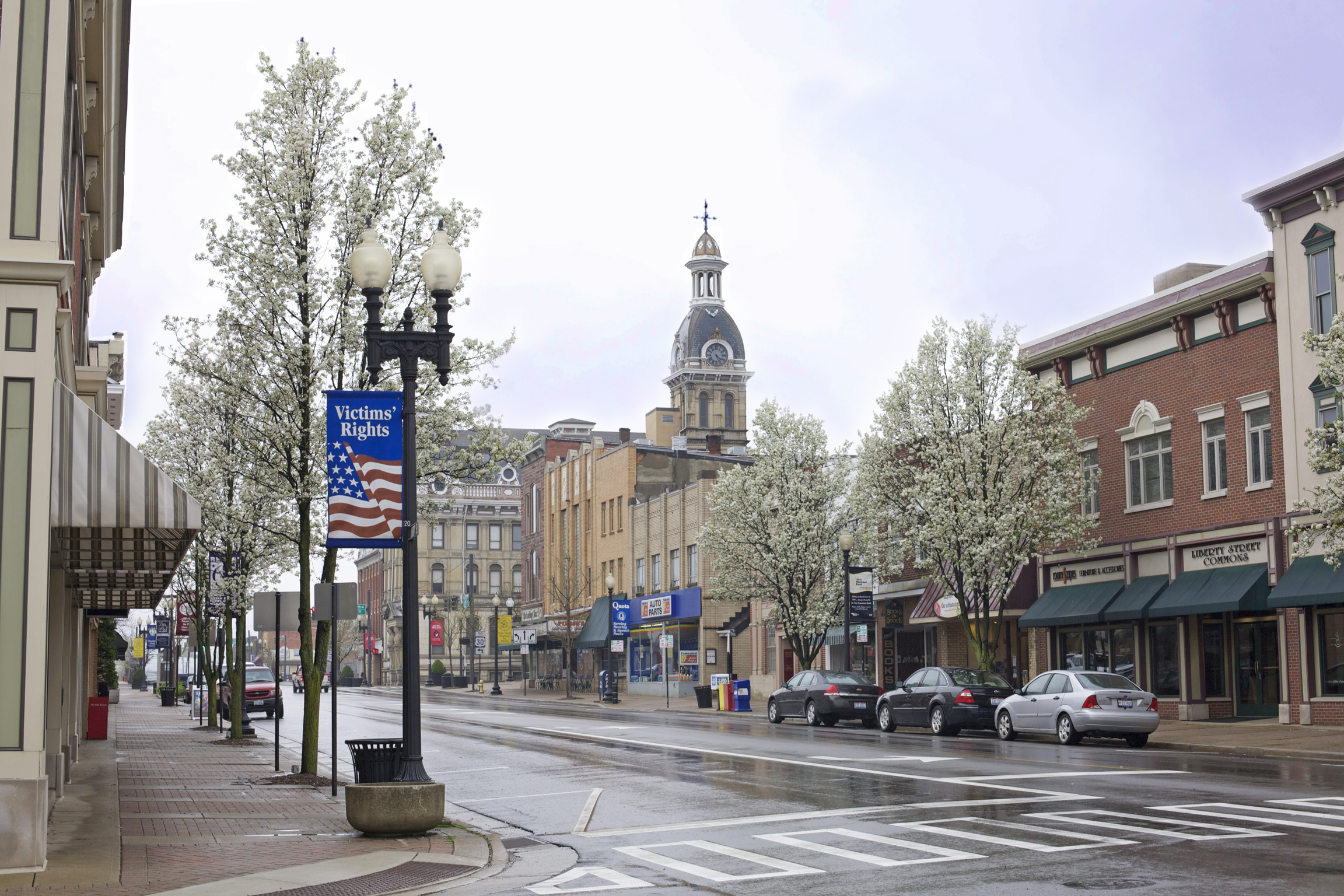
- East Liberty Street in Downtown Wooster

- Flag Logo
- Interactive map of Wooster, Ohio
- Location within Ohio Location within the United States
- Coordinates: 40°47′30″N 81°56′14″W
- Country: United States
- State: Ohio
- County: Wayne
- Founded: 1808

Government
  - Type: Mayor-Council

Area
  - Total: 17.37 sq mi (44.98 km^{2})
  - Land: 17.32 sq mi (44.86 km^{2})
  - Water: 0.046 sq mi (0.12 km^{2})
- Elevation: 1,135 ft (346 m)

Population (2020)
  - Total: 27,232
  - Density: 1,572.2/sq mi (607.04/km^{2})
- Time zone: UTC-5 (Eastern (EST))
  - Summer (DST): UTC-4 (EDT)
- ZIP code: 44691
- Area code: 330
- FIPS code: 39-86548
- GNIS feature ID: 1087163
- Website: woosteroh.com

Wooster (/ˈwʊstər/ WUUST-ər) is a city in Wayne County, Ohio, United States, and its county seat. Located in northeastern Ohio, the city lies approximately 50 miles (80 km) south-southwest of Cleveland, 35 miles (56 km) southwest of Akron and 30 miles (48 km) west of Canton. The population was 27,232 at the 2020 census. It is the largest in Wayne County, and the center of the Wooster micropolitan area. Wooster is home to the private College of Wooster and the main branch of the Wayne County Public Library.

== History ==
Wooster was established in 1808 by John Bever, William Henry, and Joseph Larwill and named after David Wooster, a general in the American Revolutionary War.

== Geography ==
According to the United States Census Bureau, the city has a total area of 16.36 square miles (42.37 km^{2}), of which 16.31 square miles (42.24 km^{2}) is land and 0.05 square miles (0.13 km^{2}) is water. It lies along Killbuck Creek, a tributary of the Walhonding River.

The local bedrock consists of the Cuyahoga Formation (shale) and the overlying Logan Formation (sandstone and conglomerate), both Lower Carboniferous and rich in fossils.

=== Climate ===
Climate data for Wooster Experiment Station, Ohio (1991–2020 normals, extremes 1893–2021)
Month	Jan	Feb	Mar	Apr	May	Jun	Jul	Aug	Sep	Oct	Nov	Dec	Year
Record high °F (°C)	73 (23)	76 (24)	85 (29)	92 (33)	97 (36)	100 (38)	104 (40)	105 (41)	99 (37)	92 (33)	80 (27)	74 (23)	105 (41)
Mean maximum °F (°C)	58.2 (14.6)	60.4 (15.8)	70.6 (21.4)	79.3 (26.3)	85.9 (29.9)	90.5 (32.5)	91.3 (32.9)	90.1 (32.3)	87.9 (31.1)	79.5 (26.4)	69.1 (20.6)	59.9 (15.5)	92.3 (33.5)
Mean daily maximum °F (°C)	35.1 (1.7)	38.4 (3.6)	48.1 (8.9)	61.3 (16.3)	71.8 (22.1)	80.1 (26.7)	83.6 (28.7)	82.3 (27.9)	75.8 (24.3)	63.6 (17.6)	50.6 (10.3)	39.8 (4.3)	60.9 (16.1)
Daily mean °F (°C)	26.7 (−2.9)	29.1 (−1.6)	37.8 (3.2)	49.5 (9.7)	59.9 (15.5)	68.6 (20.3)	72.1 (22.3)	70.5 (21.4)	63.6 (17.6)	52.1 (11.2)	41.1 (5.1)	31.9 (−0.1)	50.2 (10.1)
Mean daily minimum °F (°C)	18.2 (−7.7)	19.8 (−6.8)	27.4 (−2.6)	37.7 (3.2)	48.0 (8.9)	57.0 (13.9)	60.5 (15.8)	58.8 (14.9)	51.5 (10.8)	40.5 (4.7)	31.5 (−0.3)	24.0 (−4.4)	39.6 (4.2)
Mean minimum °F (°C)	−2.6 (−19.2)	2.3 (−16.5)	10.1 (−12.2)	23.0 (−5.0)	32.8 (0.4)	42.3 (5.7)	49.8 (9.9)	47.2 (8.4)	38.4 (3.6)	27.1 (−2.7)	17.8 (−7.9)	7.1 (−13.8)	−5.0 (−20.6)
Record low °F (°C)	−24 (−31)	−21 (−29)	−9 (−23)	7 (−14)	24 (−4)	31 (−1)	37 (3)	36 (2)	27 (−3)	16 (−9)	−2 (−19)	−19 (−28)	−24 (−31)
Average precipitation inches (mm)	2.59 (66)	2.04 (52)	2.98 (76)	4.04 (103)	4.53 (115)	4.77 (121)	4.41 (112)	3.87 (98)	3.58 (91)	3.49 (89)	2.96 (75)	2.72 (69)	41.98 (1,066)
Average snowfall inches (cm)	9.4 (24)	7.0 (18)	4.9 (12)	0.7 (1.8)	0.0 (0.0)	0.0 (0.0)	0.0 (0.0)	0.0 (0.0)	0.0 (0.0)	0.0 (0.0)	1.2 (3.0)	5.4 (14)	28.6 (73)
Average precipitation days (≥ 0.01 in)	13.7	11.5	12.4	13.4	14.0	12.4	11.2	9.2	9.4	10.8	11.1	12.7	141.8
Average snowy days (≥ 0.1 in)	7.6	5.8	3.8	0.8	0.0	0.0	0.0	0.0	0.0	0.0	1.1	5.2	24.3
Source: NOAA

== Demographics ==
Historical population
Census	Pop.	Note	%±
1810	291		—
1820	467		60.5%
1830	977		109.2%
1840	1,913		95.8%
1850	2,797		46.2%
1860	3,361		20.2%
1870	5,419		61.2%
1880	5,840		7.8%
1890	5,901		1.0%
1900	6,063		2.7%
1910	6,136		1.2%
1920	8,204		33.7%
1930	10,742		30.9%
1940	11,543		7.5%
1950	14,005		21.3%
1960	17,046		21.7%
1970	18,703		9.7%
1980	19,273		3.0%
1990	22,191		15.1%
2000	24,811		11.8%
2010	26,119		5.3%
2020	27,232		4.3%
2025 (est.)	27,115		−0.4%

=== 2020 census ===
As of the 2020 census, Wooster had a population of 27,232 and a median age of 37.7 years; 18.4% of residents were under the age of 18 and 20.2% were 65 years of age or older. For every 100 females there were 90.6 males, and for every 100 females age 18 and over there were 88.0 males age 18 and over.

99.6% of residents lived in urban areas, while 0.4% lived in rural areas.

There were 11,065 households in Wooster, of which 23.9% had children under the age of 18 living in them. Of all households, 40.4% were married-couple households, 20.6% were households with a male householder and no spouse or partner present, and 31.7% were households with a female householder and no spouse or partner present. About 37.3% of all households consisted of individuals and 16.2% had someone living alone who was 65 years of age or older.

There were 11,868 housing units, of which 6.8% were vacant; the homeowner vacancy rate was 1.1% and the rental vacancy rate was 6.1%.

Racial composition as of the 2020 census
Race	Number	Percent
White	23,655	86.9%
Black or African American	980	3.6%
American Indian and Alaska Native	42	0.2%
Asian	547	2.0%
Native Hawaiian and Other Pacific Islander	9	0.0%
Some other race	334	1.2%
Two or more races	1,665	6.1%
Hispanic or Latino (of any race)	851	3.1%

=== 2011 American Community Survey ===
In 2011, 93.3% spoke English, 2.4% Spanish, and 1.3% German.

=== 2010 census ===
As of the census of 2010, there were 26,119 people, 10,733 households, and 6,244 families residing in the city. The population density was 1,601.4 inhabitants per square mile (618.3/km^{2}). There were 11,822 housing units at an average density of 724.8 per square mile (279.8/km^{2}). The racial makeup of the city was 91.2% White, 3.6% African American, 0.3% Native American, 1.9% Asian, 0.7% from other races, and 2.4% from two or more races. Hispanic or Latino of any race were 2.2% of the population.

There were 10,733 households, of which 26.5% had children under the age of 18 living with them, 43.1% were married couples living together, 11.3% had a female householder with no husband present, 3.8% had a male householder with no wife present, and 41.8% were non-families. 35.4% of all households were made up of individuals, and 14.2% had someone living alone who was 65 years of age or older. The average household size was 2.21 and the average family size was 2.86.

The median age in the city was 37.3 years. 20.4% of residents were under the age of 18; 14.8% were between the ages of 18 and 24; 23.1% were from 25 to 44; 25.1% were from 45 to 64; and 16.6% were 65 years of age or older. The gender makeup of the city was 47.6% male and 52.4% female.

=== 2000 census ===
As of the census of 2000, there were 24,811 people, 10,040 households, and 6,174 families residing in the city. The population density was 1,726.1 inhabitants per square mile (666.5/km^{2}). There were 10,674 housing units at an average density of 742.6 per square mile (286.7/km^{2}). The racial makeup of the city was 92.59% White, 3.82% African American, 0.26% Native American, 1.54% Asian, 0.01% Pacific Islander, 0.36% from other races, and 1.42% from two or more races. Hispanic or Latino of any race were 1.07% of the population.

There were 10,040 households, out of which 28.4% had children under the age of 18 living with them, 46.9% were married couples living together, 11.2% had a female householder with no husband present, and 38.5% were non-families. 32.4% of all households were made up of individuals, and 11.7% had someone living alone who was 65 years of age or older. The average household size was 2.28 and the average family size was 2.88.

In the city, the population was spread out, with 22.0% under the age of 18, 14.9% from 18 to 24, 25.9% from 25 to 44, 22.4% from 45 to 64, and 14.8% who were 65 years of age or older. The median age was 36 years. For every 100 females, there were 91.3 males. For every 100 females age 18 and over, there were 88.3 males.

The median income for a household in the city was $37,400, and the median income for a family was $47,118. Males had a median income of $34,021 versus $23,608 for females. The per capita income for the city was $21,505. About 7.8% of families and 10.4% of the population were below the poverty line, including 14.5% of those under age 18 and 8.0% of those age 65 or over.

== Economy ==
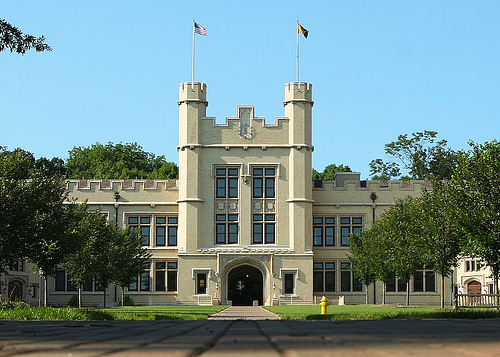
Kauke Hall at the College of Wooster

Wooster is the headquarters of several industrial entities. Buehler Food Markets Inc., Wooster Brush, Seaman Corp., Tricor Industrial, and Certified Angus Beef have corporate headquarters located in Wooster. Rubbermaid made its corporate headquarters in Wooster until the end of 2003. LuK, the German maker of dual-clutch transmissions has its North America headquarters in Wooster where mainly torque converters are produced. Other large commercial operations in Wooster are Frito-Lay, Akron Brass, United Titanium, Western Reserve Group Insurance Company, Daisy Brands, and Bogner Construction Company. Wooster is also the world headquarters of the Prentke Romich Company (PRC) which is a member of a consortium of companies that produce assistive technology and augmentative communication devices.

For its size, Wooster is also dedicated to the "industry of education." It has the College of Wooster, and two subsidiaries of Ohio State University: the Agricultural Technical Institute (ATI); and the Ohio Agricultural Research and Development Center (OARDC), a teaching and research facility dedicated to agricultural science.

In addition to these industries, Wooster remains an agricultural center for Ohio. The OARDC enriches the local farms with knowledge and expertise, which is proudly displayed at the annual Wayne County Fair, held each September (see also Fair). Students in Wooster and surrounding rural communities continue to enroll in youth farming programs such as 4-H and National FFA Organization. Many Amish farmers come to Wooster by horse-and-buggy for commerce as well. In June 2013, the city of Wooster announced that Daisy Brand, a sour cream producer, plans to open a new Midwest manufacturing plant in Wooster. Daisy Brand promised to create at least 89 full-time positions and is slated to begin production sometime in 2016.

The overlap of strong education and advanced manufacturing has led to number of small innovative firms being founded in Wooster in recent years including Quasar Energy Group, ExpenseWire, ABS Materials, 3i-ingredients, and Cureo. Wooster also has a local food community including Local Roots, a collective year round food cooperative and indor farmer's market for locally produced goods.

== Arts and culture ==
Wooster, and the greater Wayne County community, is served by the Wayne Center for the Arts, which displays artwork by local artists, offers instructional courses, and stages performances. The city is home to the annual Wayne County Fair.

The College of Wooster is home to the Ohio Light Opera, a professional opera company that performs the light opera repertory, including Gilbert and Sullivan, and American, British, and continental operettas of the late 19th and early 20th centuries.

The Wooster Symphony Orchestra, founded in 1915, is a joint venture between the Wooster community and the College of Wooster. The Symphony is the second oldest continually performing in the state.

== Sports ==
For the 2007–2008 season, Wooster was granted a team in the Mid-Atlantic Hockey League called the Wooster Warriors. The MAHL suspended operations of February 2008, and the Warriors subsequently relocated to Trenton, Michigan.

Wooster was the home to the Wooster Korn Kings, a minor league professional ice hockey team that was a member of the All American Hockey League. The team's home arena was Alice Noble Ice Arena.

Another hockey team, the Wooster Oilers, began playing at the Alice Noble Ice Arena in 2006. The team competes in the North American 3 Hockey League. It won the 2009–2010 championship. The team moves players to higher levels of junior or college hockey.

== Parks and recreation ==
Wooster Memorial Park, locally known as Spangler Park, contains 7 mi (11 km) of hiking trails through woods, ravines, and open fields along the Rathburn Run. Christmas Run Park has playgrounds, pavilions, and a picnic area. Schellin Park has a skate park, playground and picnic facilities. Oak Hill Park has pavilions and paved walking trails. Freedlander park has the pool, basketball courts, pavilions, and a pond as well.

The College of Wooster has a golf course, bowling alley, and multipurpose athletic facility open to the public. Also located in the city is Alice Noble Ice Arena, an indoor ice skating and hockey facility open year-round. The Secrest Arboretum is located on the campus of the Ohio Agricultural Research and Development Center.

== Government ==
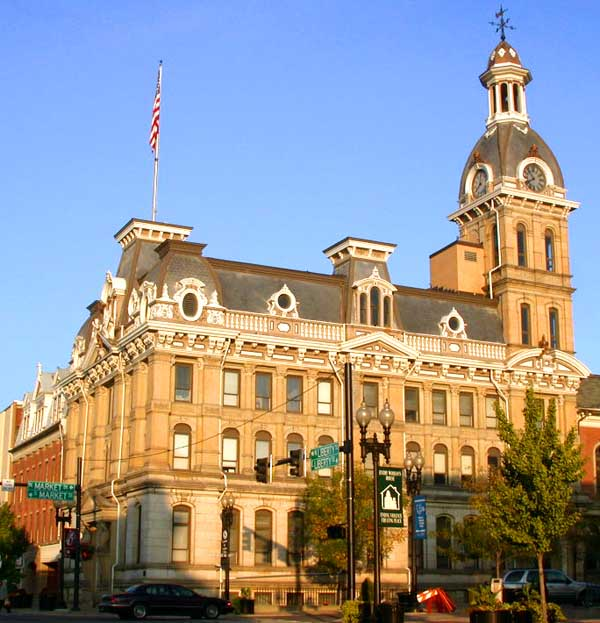
Wayne County Courthouse District in downtown Wooster

=== Mayor and council ===
Wooster is governed by an elected mayor. On January 1, 2024, Robert J. Reynolds (R) was sworn in as mayor. There is a seven-member city council.

=== Elected representatives ===
As of 2025, the city is represented in the Ohio House of Representatives by Meredith Craig (R); in the Ohio Senate by Al Landis (R); in the U.S. House of Representatives by Max Miller (R), and in the U.S Senate by Bernie Moreno (R) and Jon Husted (R).

== Education ==
Public education is provided by the Wooster City School District. The district operates one preschool, four elementary schools (grades K–4), one middle school (grades 5–8), and Wooster High School (grades 8–12). The district also operates Boys Village School, an alternative school for boys in grades 6 through 12.

Wooster is home to the College of Wooster, a private liberal arts college, and two campuses of Ohio State University: the Agricultural Technical Institute (ATI) and the Ohio Agricultural Research and Development Center (OARDC), a teaching and research facility dedicated to agricultural science.

== Media ==
=== Newspapers ===
The city has a daily newspaper, The Daily Record, previously published by Dix Communications/Wooster Republican Printing Co. Currently published by Gannett, and a weekly paper, The Wooster Weekly News, published by Graphic Publications Inc. In addition, the Akron Beacon Journal occasionally covers the city and Wayne County. Students of Wooster High School publish a bi-weekly student-run publication, The Wooster Blade.

== Transportation ==
U.S. Route 30 and U.S. Route 250, as well as Ohio State Route 3 and Ohio State Route 83, run through the center of the city.

The Wayne County Airport (BJJ) serves as an air access point for many of the businesses throughout the city. The Akron-Canton Airport is the nearest commercial airport with scheduled passenger flights.

Wooster Fixed Route Transportation consists of a single bus line with 21 stops.

Prior to Amtrak's establishment, the Penn Central ran the daily Manhattan Limited (Chicago – Pittsburgh – New York City) through Wooster. Previously, the Pennsylvania Railroad had additionally run the Pennsylvania Limited (Chicago – Pittsburgh – New York City) as well as the Fort Pitt (Pittsburgh – Chicago) with a stop in the town.

== Notable people ==
The following individuals were born in, raised in, lived in, or currently live in Wooster.

- Dan Auerbach (born 1979), musician, vocalist and guitarist
- Jon Belmont (born 1952), radio newscaster, ABC New York, and Associated Press Washington D.C.
- David Berman (1967–2019), musician; member of bands Silver Jews and Purple Mountains
- Lori Bettison-Varga (born 1962), geologist, president of the Los Angeles Museum of Natural History
- Marquise Blair, NFL-player for the Seattle Seahawks
- US Representative George Bliss (1813–1868), attorney, judge, politician
- Vince Cellini (born 1959), broadcaster, sports journalist
- Dean Chance (1941–2015), Major League Baseball pitcher, 1964 Cy Young Award winner
- William Estabrook Chancellor (1867–1963), author, professor of history
- Joan Chase (1936–2018), novelist
- Martha Chase (1927–2003), biologist, geneticist, professor
- Clarence Childs (1883–1960), 1912 Olympic bronze medalist in hammer throw, college football coach
- Ginger Clark (1879–1943), Major League Baseball player
- Arthur Compton (1892–1962), physicist, Nobel Laureate
- Karl Compton (1887–1954), physicist
- Hal Dean (1922–2011), professional football player
- John Dean (born 1938), attorney, politician, banker; White House Counsel to Richard Nixon
- Edward Fenwick (1768–1832), priest, college founder, missionary
- David Fishelson (born 1956), theatre, film and television producer and playwright
- Charles Follis (1879–1910), first African-American to play professional football
- Hollis Frampton (1936–1984), avant-garde filmmaker, photographer, writer/theoretician, and pioneer of digital art
- Elizebeth Friedman (1892–1980), cryptographer, student of languages and literature
- William H. Gass (born 1924), author, educator
- Stanley Gault (1926–2016), CEO and chairman, Rubbermaid, Inc. and Goodyear Tire and Rubber Company
- Richard Gibbs, musician
- Guy Hecker (1856–1938), Major League Baseball player
- Sarah Hider (born 1991), Miss Ohio 2015
- August Imgard (1828–1904), German immigrant once credited with introducing the Christmas tree to the U.S.
- Philip Jameson (born 1941), professor of trombone and music at the University of Georgia
- Duncan Jones, film director, son of Hall of Fame rock musician David Bowie
- Josh Krajcik (born 1981), musician, finalist on The X Factor TV competition
- Jack Lengyel, software executive, football coach
- Roscoe C. McCulloch (1880–1958), attorney, politician
- George Morgan (1924–1975), country music singer
- Bill Musselman (1940–2000), basketball coach in NCAA, ABA, WBA, CBA and NBA
- Roger Peckinpaugh (1891–1977), Major League Baseball player and manager
- Jack Perkins (born 1933), journalist
- Bob Peterson (born 1961), animator for Pixar
- Joseph Banks Rhine (1895–1980), psychologist, professor of parapsychology
- Dick Schafrath (1937–2021), professional football player
- John Sloane (1779–1856), Ohio Secretary of State, U.S. House of Representatives and U.S. Treasurer
- James Stuart, founder of Ohio Light Opera, musician, singer, professor of music.
- Lynn St. John (1876–1950), athlete, basketball coach
- Tyrell Sutton (born 1986), football player
- Oris Paxton Van Sweringen and Mantis James Van Sweringen (1879–1936 and 1881–1934, respectively), businessmen, railroad tycoons
- Angeline Teal (1842–1913), writer
- Billy Uhl (born 1950), motorcycle enduro competitor and five-time gold medal winner in the International Six Day Trials
- Hal Varian (born 1947), economist specializing in microeconomics and information economics
- John T. Walton (1946–2005), businessman, soldier, philanthropist, son of Wal-Mart founder, Sam Walton
- Sidney Abram Weltmer (1858–1930), author and founder of the Weltmer Institute of Suggestive Therapeutics
- Carl V. Weygandt (1988-1964), Chief Justice of the Ohio Supreme Court from 1933–1962
- Kaiser Wilhelm (1874–1936), Major League Baseball player
- John Howard Yoder (1927–1997), Christian (Mennonite) theologian, author, pacifist

== Sister cities ==
Wooster has one sister city:

- Collepietro, Abruzzi, Italy

== See also ==
- Wooster Nagar, a fishing village in India named after Wooster, whose residents funded the construction of houses there
