= Secrest Arboretum =

Arboretum in Wooster, Ohio, United States

Coordinates: 40.779339°N 81.925006°W

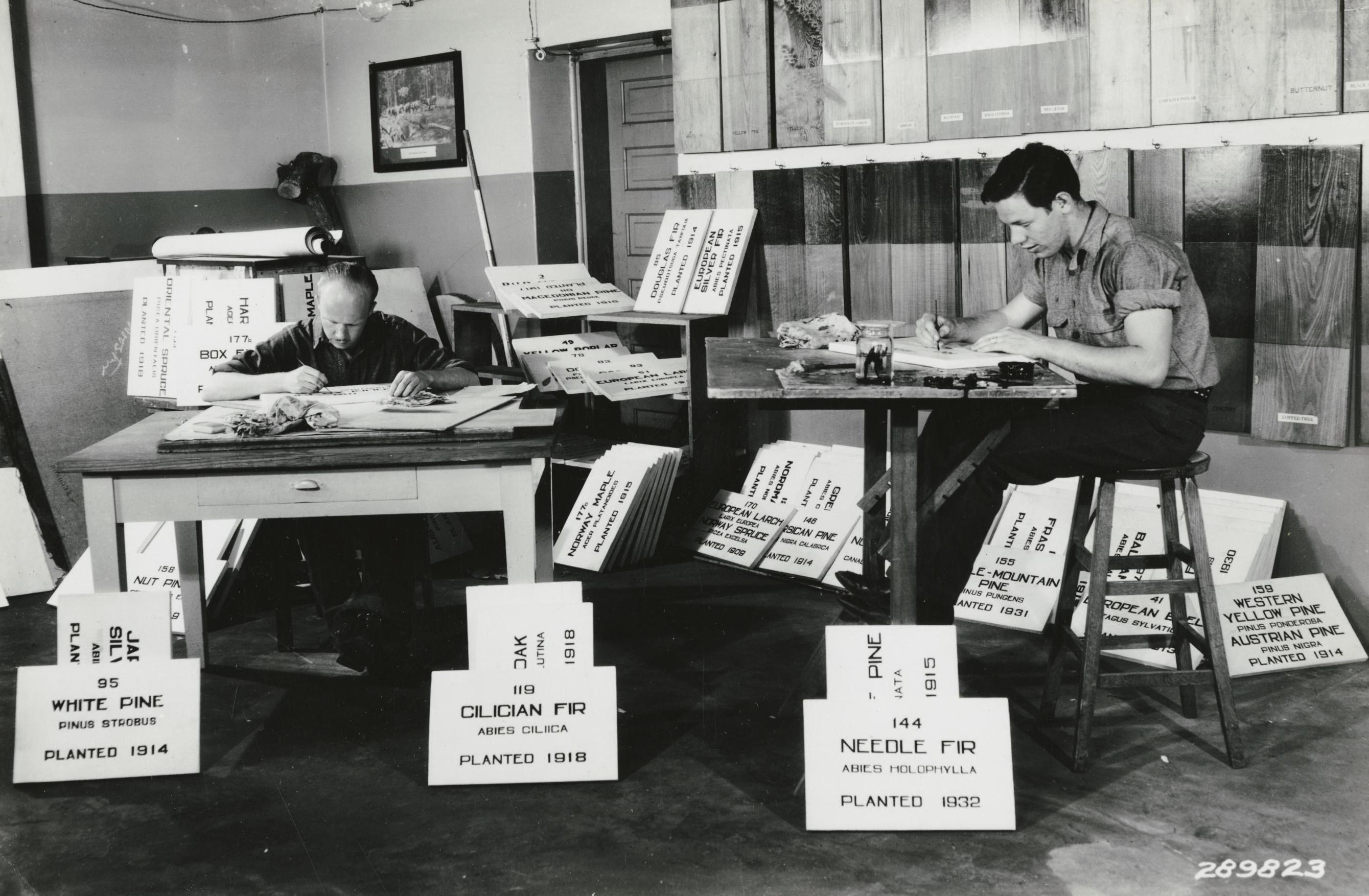
- Civilian Conservation Corps employees making signs for the arboretum.
- Interactive map of Secrest Arboretum
- Type: Arboretum
- Area: 110 acres (45 ha)
- Visitors: 10,000 per year
- Open: Open daily
- Website: secrest.osu.edu

Secrest Arboretum (110 acres) is an arboretum located on the campus of the Ohio Agricultural Research and Development Center (OARDC), at the intersection of Pine Road and Green Drive, Wooster, Ohio. It is open daily without charge and hosts an estimated 10,000 visitors each year.

Secrest Arboretum is the Ohio State University's primary research arboretum, and contains over 2,000 native and introduced species and cultivars of trees, shrubs, and other plants. Planting began in 1905. It was established in 1909 when Edmund Secrest set out the first planting for a proposed Forest Arboretum.

As of 2005, the arboretum contains the following Ohio champion trees: Giant Dogwood (Cornus controversa), Nikko Fir (Abies homolepis), Nordmann Fir (Abies nordmaniana), and Japanese Larch (Larix leptolepsis). The arboretum also boasts a collection of Dawn Redwood trees, a fast-growing and deciduous conifer and the only remaining species of Metasequoia, and the Garden of Roses of Legend and Romance, which features about 500 varieties of roses.

== See also ==
- List of botanical gardens in the United States
