= Life Lessons =

Life Lessons may refer to:

- "Life Lessons" (Danny Phantom), a 2005 episode of the animated television series Danny Phantom
- Life Lessons (New York Stories), a segment of the 1989 anthology film New York Stories
- Life Lessons: A Series of Practical Lessons of Life, from Life, and about Life, a book by Grace Mann Brown
