= Nevada, Missouri =

City in Missouri, U.S.

- City
- Location within Vernon County and Missouri
- Coordinates: 37°50′18″N 94°21′23″W
- Country: United States
- State: Missouri
- County: Vernon

Area
  - Total: 9.06 sq mi (23.47 km^{2})
  - Land: 8.98 sq mi (23.27 km^{2})
  - Water: 0.077 sq mi (0.20 km^{2})
- Elevation: 863 ft (263 m)

Population (2020)
  - Total: 8,212
  - Density: 914.0/sq mi (352.88/km^{2})
- Time zone: UTC-6 (Central (CST))
  - Summer (DST): UTC-5 (CDT)
- ZIP code: 64772
- Area code: 417
- FIPS code: 29-51644
- GNIS feature ID: 2395179
- Website: nevadamo.gov

Nevada (/nɪˈveɪdə/ niv-AY-də) is a city in and the county seat of Vernon County, Missouri, United States. The population was 8,212 at the 2020 census. The local government has a council-manager model.

== History ==
When French explorers entered the region in the late 17th century, they encountered the indigenous Osage people, who controlled a vast area extending west from present-day Saint Louis, including territories now within several states. The Osage Village State Historic Site, formerly known as the Carrington Osage Village Site, is located on a hilltop above the Osage River valley. Archeological evidence shows an Osage band that lived there had nearly 200 lodges and an estimated population of 2,000 to 3,000; they occupied the area from about 1700–1775. They were the most influential people in the region and were integral to the fur trade.

After the United States acquired the territory west of the Mississippi River in the Louisiana Purchase, through the rest of the 19th century, it stole the Osage lands, and forced the Osage to cede their lands and remove to Indian Territory. This site has been designated as a National Historic Landmark for its significance to the Osage people and American history.

Nevada was originally called "Hog Eye" by European-American settlers, and under that name was platted in 1855. The town's name was changed to Nevada by circuit and county clerk DeWitt C. Hunter, after Nevada City, California, where he had been a gold miner.

From 1897 to 1933, Nevada was home to the Weltmer Institute of Suggestive Therapeutics, founded by Sidney Abram Weltmer and Joseph H. Kelly. Weltmer bought a 17-room mansion, built in 1886 by Frank P. Anderson, a successful railroad builder. They wanted a facility large enough so that they could have patients stay for extended periods in a kind of boarding house. During the early 20th century, this healing institute attracted thousands of clients who believed in Weltmer's cures by mental healing. People paid $100 to stay for a 10-day course of treatment. They also paid for instructional classes. The institute also conducted a large mail-order business for classes and a kind of treatment by mail. It held lectures attracting several hundred people at a time.

The Institute attracted so many clients that the railroad added new trains to its schedule serving the town. In addition, the volume of mail associated with the institute's business resulted in the post office being classified as first class, and the government building a new, larger post office to handle it. The Weltmer Institute became the center of associated wellness systems and practitioners in town, which increased in prosperity. It attracted clairvoyants and psychotherapists, emerging as a new profession. It also attracted people promising various types of miracle cures for such illnesses as tuberculosis, which then had no cure.

In the early 20th century, the town attracted many enthusiasts of what was known as the New Thought Movement. In 1905 the Weltmer Auditorium was the site of the Fifth Annual Convention of the New Thought Federation, held on September 26–29, 1905. Ernest Weltmer, the eldest son of Sidney A. Weltmer, was Secretary of the Federation and helped open the convention. Among the several speakers from across the country was Grace Mann Brown, and entertainment was provided by singers including the Weltmer Quartette. Mrs. Brown served as President of the Federation the following year. In 1916, New Thought followers returned to Nevada for the second International Conference of the movement, and Sidney A. Weltmer was among the speakers.

After Weltmer's death and the institute's closure in 1933, the mansion was sold for use as a funeral home. By late 2004, the building was slated for demolition to redevelop the site. Although some residents were interested in its history and the Weltmer Institute, the building was never nominated as a significant historic building or classified for preservation. The City Council approved it being scheduled to be demolished in late 2004 for other development.

Significant historic properties in Nevada include the Infirmary Building, Missouri State Hospital Number 3, Vernon County Courthouse, and Vernon County Jail, Sheriff's House and Office, which are also listed on the National Register of Historic Places.

=== 2025 tornado ===
On April 2, 2025, an EF1 tornado struck the city, damaging homes and other buildings in Nevada.

== Geography ==
Nevada is located in central Vernon County at the intersection of US routes 71 and 54. I-49 runs through Nevada concurrent with US 71.

According to the United States Census Bureau, the city has a total area of 9.06 square miles (23.47 km^{2}), of which 8.98 square miles (23.26 km^{2}) is land and 0.08 square miles (0.21 km^{2}) is water.

Willow Branch and Birch Branch flow through Nevada.

=== Climate ===
Climate data for Nevada Water Plant, Missouri (1991–2020 normals, extremes 1898–present)
Month	Jan	Feb	Mar	Apr	May	Jun	Jul	Aug	Sep	Oct	Nov	Dec	Year
Record high °F (°C)	80 (27)	82 (28)	90 (32)	95 (35)	98 (37)	106 (41)	117 (47)	114 (46)	109 (43)	96 (36)	85 (29)	78 (26)	117 (47)
Mean maximum °F (°C)	65.6 (18.7)	69.9 (21.1)	78.5 (25.8)	83.7 (28.7)	88.1 (31.2)	93.6 (34.2)	97.9 (36.6)	98.4 (36.9)	93.5 (34.2)	85.8 (29.9)	74.6 (23.7)	67.0 (19.4)	99.5 (37.5)
Mean daily maximum °F (°C)	41.5 (5.3)	46.6 (8.1)	56.6 (13.7)	66.6 (19.2)	75.3 (24.1)	84.4 (29.1)	88.7 (31.5)	88.0 (31.1)	80.3 (26.8)	69.3 (20.7)	56.2 (13.4)	45.3 (7.4)	66.6 (19.2)
Daily mean °F (°C)	31.5 (−0.3)	36.0 (2.2)	45.7 (7.6)	55.7 (13.2)	65.1 (18.4)	74.3 (23.5)	78.5 (25.8)	77.3 (25.2)	69.3 (20.7)	57.8 (14.3)	45.7 (7.6)	35.7 (2.1)	56.1 (13.4)
Mean daily minimum °F (°C)	21.5 (−5.8)	25.5 (−3.6)	34.9 (1.6)	44.7 (7.1)	54.9 (12.7)	64.3 (17.9)	68.4 (20.2)	66.6 (19.2)	58.3 (14.6)	46.2 (7.9)	35.2 (1.8)	26.2 (−3.2)	45.6 (7.6)
Mean minimum °F (°C)	4.3 (−15.4)	9.0 (−12.8)	17.6 (−8.0)	30.4 (−0.9)	41.2 (5.1)	53.7 (12.1)	60.4 (15.8)	57.4 (14.1)	43.9 (6.6)	30.6 (−0.8)	19.8 (−6.8)	9.7 (−12.4)	0.9 (−17.3)
Record low °F (°C)	−20 (−29)	−27 (−33)	−9 (−23)	15 (−9)	27 (−3)	42 (6)	44 (7)	43 (6)	25 (−4)	18 (−8)	0 (−18)	−25 (−32)	−27 (−33)
Average precipitation inches (mm)	1.77 (45)	2.07 (53)	3.41 (87)	5.20 (132)	6.77 (172)	5.35 (136)	4.74 (120)	3.83 (97)	4.60 (117)	3.45 (88)	3.06 (78)	2.22 (56)	46.47 (1,180)
Average snowfall inches (cm)	2.5 (6.4)	1.5 (3.8)	0.7 (1.8)	0.0 (0.0)	0.0 (0.0)	0.0 (0.0)	0.0 (0.0)	0.0 (0.0)	0.0 (0.0)	0.0 (0.0)	0.2 (0.51)	1.5 (3.8)	6.4 (16)
Average precipitation days (≥ 0.01 in)	6.8	6.6	9.2	10.5	11.7	10.2	9.0	7.2	7.7	8.7	7.8	6.2	101.6
Average snowy days (≥ 0.1 in)	2.5	0.9	0.4	0.0	0.0	0.0	0.0	0.0	0.0	0.0	0.2	1.2	5.2
Source: NOAA

== Demographics ==
Historical population
Census	Pop.	Note	%±
1880	1,913		—
1890	7,262		279.6%
1900	7,461		2.7%
1910	7,176		−3.8%
1920	7,139		−0.5%
1930	7,448		4.3%
1940	8,181		9.8%
1950	8,009		−2.1%
1960	8,416		5.1%
1970	9,736		15.7%
1980	9,044		−7.1%
1990	8,597		−4.9%
2000	8,607		0.1%
2010	8,386		−2.6%
2020	8,212		−2.1%
U.S. Decennial Census

=== 2020 census ===
As of the 2020 census, Nevada had a population of 8,212. The census also reported 1,933 families. The median age was 36.5 years. 23.6% of residents were under the age of 18 and 19.4% of residents were 65 years of age or older. For every 100 females there were 82.9 males, and for every 100 females age 18 and over there were 77.2 males age 18 and over.

96.2% of residents lived in urban areas, while 3.8% lived in rural areas.

There were 3,353 households in Nevada, of which 26.4% had children under the age of 18 living in them. Of all households, 31.3% were married-couple households, 21.4% were households with a male householder and no spouse or partner present, and 38.8% were households with a female householder and no spouse or partner present. About 40.1% of all households were made up of individuals and 16.9% had someone living alone who was 65 years of age or older.

There were 3,960 housing units, of which 15.3% were vacant. The homeowner vacancy rate was 3.7% and the rental vacancy rate was 13.2%.

Racial composition as of the 2020 census
Race	Number	Percent
White	7,302	88.9%
Black or African American	98	1.2%
American Indian and Alaska Native	87	1.1%
Asian	56	0.7%
Native Hawaiian and Other Pacific Islander	9	0.1%
Some other race	129	1.6%
Two or more races	531	6.5%
Hispanic or Latino (of any race)	280	3.4%

=== Income and poverty ===
The 2016–2020 5-year American Community Survey estimates show that the median household income was $37,451 (with a margin of error of +/- $5,204) and the median family income was $50,920 (+/- $11,441). Males had a median income of $30,625 (+/- $9,230) versus $24,931 (+/- $5,327) for females. The median income for those above 16 years old was $26,080 (+/- $3,745). Approximately, 10.2% of families and 19.9% of the population were below the poverty line, including 29.7% of those under the age of 18 and 10.7% of those ages 65 or over.

=== 2010 census ===
As of the census of 2010, there were 8,386 people, 3,491 households, and 1,908 families living in the city. The population density was 933.9 inhabitants per square mile (360.6/km^{2}). There were 4,018 housing units at an average density of 447.4 per square mile (172.7/km^{2}). The racial makeup of the city was 95.1% White, 1.1% African American, 0.8% Native American, 0.8% Asian, 0.6% from other races, and 1.6% from two or more races. Hispanic or Latino of any race were 2.0% of the population.

There were 3,491 households, of which 28.2% had children under the age of 18 living with them, 35.9% were married couples living together, 14.1% had a female householder with no husband present, 4.6% had a male householder with no wife present, and 45.3% were non-families. 40.3% of all households were made up of individuals, and 17.1% had someone living alone who was 65 years of age or older. The average household size was 2.16, and the average family size was 2.88.

The median age in the city was 38.3 years. 23.3% of residents were under 18; 11.5% were between the ages of 18 and 24; 22.6% were from 25 to 44; 24.4% were from 45 to 64; and 18.2% were 65 years of age or older. The gender makeup of the city was 45.3% male and 54.7% female.

=== 2000 census ===
As of the census of 2000, there were 8,607 people, 3,463 households, and 1,973 families living in the city. The population density was 964.1 inhabitants per square mile (372.2/km^{2}). There were 3,857 housing units at an average density of 432.0 per square mile (166.8/km^{2}). The racial makeup of the city was 95.79% White, 1.03% African American, 0.94% Native American, 0.44% Asian, 0.05% Pacific Islander, 0.49% from other races, and 1.25% from two or more races. Hispanic or Latino of any race were 1.29% of the population.

There were 3,463 households, out of which 29.9% had children under the age of 18 living with them, 40.1% were married couples living together, 13.3% had a female householder with no husband present, and 43.0% were non-families. 38.5% of all households were made up of individuals, and 17.8% had someone living alone who was 65 years of age or older. The average household size was 2.22, and the average family size was 2.95.

In the city, the population was spread out, with 25.8% under the age of 18, 11.8% from 18 to 24, 24.7% from 25 to 44, 18.8% from 45 to 64, and 18.9% 65 years of age or older. The median age was 35 years. For every 100 females, there were 82.1 males. For every 100 females age 18 and over, there were 74.3 males.

The median income for a household in the city was $25,774, and the median income for a family was $36,639. Males had a median income of $28,939 versus $17,424 for females. The per capita income for the city was $15,118. About 13.7% of families and 20.0% of the population were below the poverty line, including 28.7% of those under age 18 and 16.4% of those age 65 or over.

== Education ==
Public education in Nevada is administered by the Nevada R-V School District, which operates Nevada High School.

Nevada has a lending library, the Nevada Public Library.

Nevada is home to Cottey College which is a private women's college. It was founded by Virginia Alice (Cottey) Stockard in 1884. Since 1927 it has been owned and supported by the P.E.O. Sisterhood, a philanthropic women's organization based in Des Moines, Iowa. It was founded as a preparatory school for girls and women, and by 1932 was a two-year liberal arts college. In 2011, it achieved accreditation as a four-year baccalaureate-granting college.

Nevada also has a Crowder College Branch.

== Transportation ==
Intercity bus service to the city is provided by Jefferson Lines.

Nevada is served by US 71 and 54 along with I-49. I-49 runs concurrent with US 71.

== Notable people ==
- Russell Alexander — circus band composer, performer, and entertainer
- Eva Bowring − United States Senator for Nebraska
- Patricia Breckenridge − former Associate Justice of Supreme Court of Missouri
- Jetta Carleton − novelist, author of the bestselling The Moonflower Vine
- Harvey C. Clark, U.S. Army brigadier general
- Forrest DeBernardi − member of the Basketball Hall of Fame
- Ed Emery — state senator and former state representative
- Clark Griffith - Major League Baseball pitcher and co-founder of the American League
- John Huston − actor, director, screenwriter, and producer (born there)
- Walter Huston − actor of stage and screen (lived there 1905–09)
- Frank James − guerrilla and outlaw, brother of Jesse James
- George Lyons - Major League Baseball pitcher
- Brett Merriman — Major League Baseball player, Nevada High School 1984 graduating class.
- Bill Phelps − former lieutenant governor of Missouri
- Kimbrough Stone - United States Circuit judge
- Anne Swainson − Head of product and graphic design at Montgomery Ward
- Marion Talley - An American opera coloratura soprano, and was in Follow Your Heart
- Sue Thompson − country and pop singer, born Eva Sue McKee
- Sidney Weltmer - founder of the Weltmer Institute of Suggestive Therapeutics

== See also ==
- List of cities in Missouri
