= Grace Mann Brown =

American writer and spiritual leader

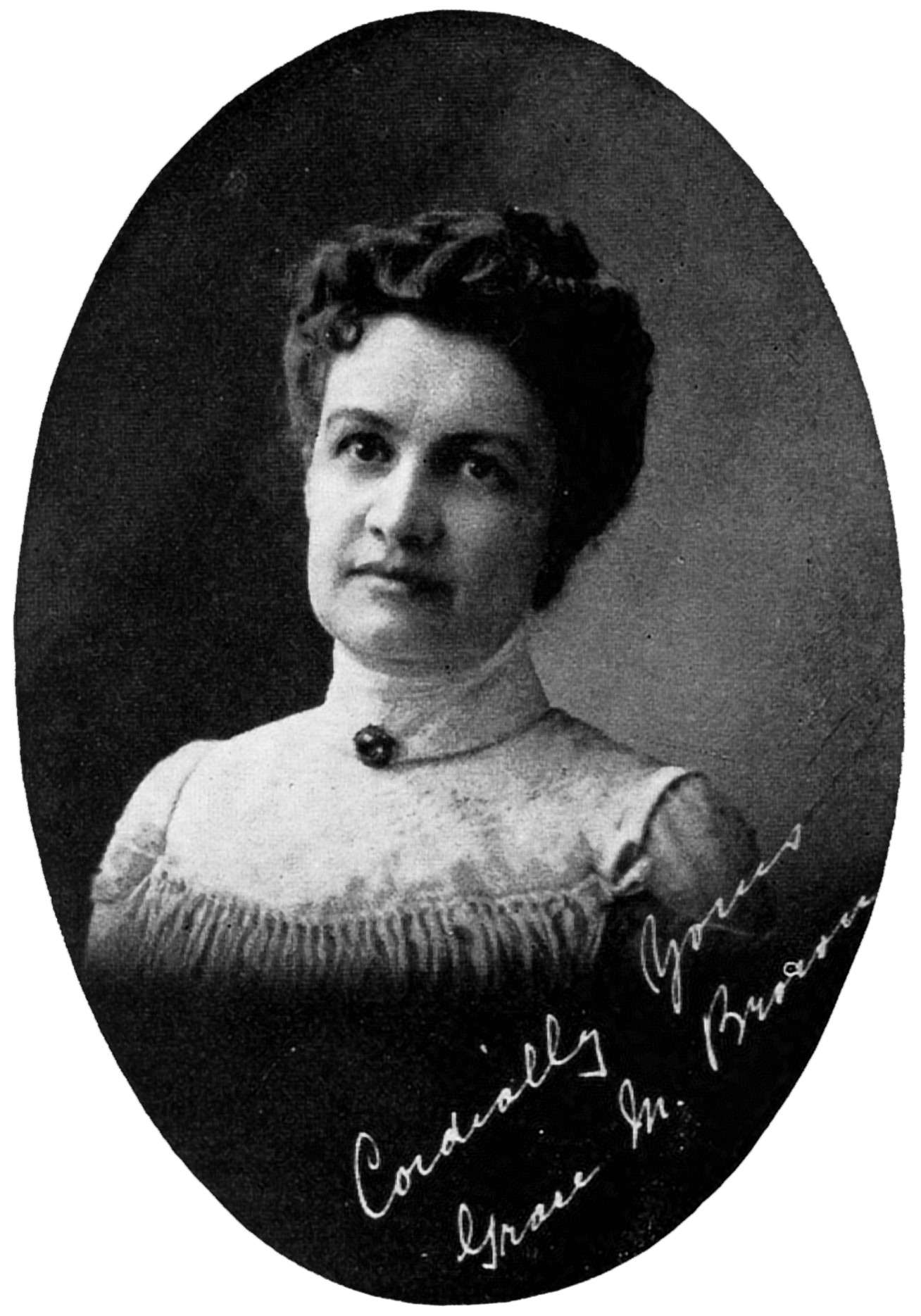
- "Cordially Yours Grace M. Brown" taken from her book Studies in Spiritual Harmony
- Born: April 16, 1859; Pippin, Wisconsin, US
- Died: April 1925 (aged 65–66); Denver, Colorado, US
- Resting place: Fairmount Cemetery, Denver
- Known for: New Thought Author
- Spouse: Joseph Lyman Brown (m. 1878; died 1921)
- Children: 3

Signature
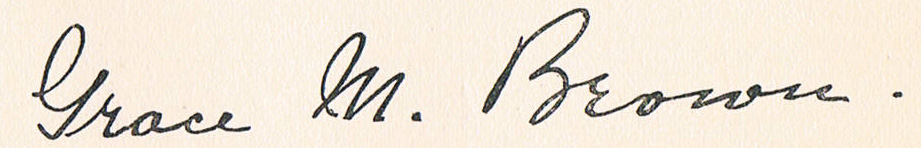

Grace Mann Brown (April 16, 1859 – 1925) was an American writer and spiritual leader. Her work was related to the New Thought Movement, especially Divine Science. Much of her work focused on spirituality, metaphysics, mysticism, esoteric and occult philosophy.

== Personal life ==
Grace Mann Brown was the daughter of Major James Cook Mann and Mary Stem Mann. Brown was educated at Eden Hall in the Sacred Heart Convent in Torresdale, Pennsylvania.

Grace Mann married Joseph Lyman Brown (1851 – November 10, 1921) from Denver, Colorado, on October 20, 1878. He was an engineer at the Denver Gas and Electric Co. The couple had three children: Bernice Brown (1888–1937), who married a Mr. Keen; James Leslie Brown (May 10, 1891– Nov 4, 1949), who became president of Thompson Manufacturing Co., Owner Thompson Pipe and Steel in Denver; and Eunice Brown (1903–1945).

Brown died in 1925 and was buried in Fairmount Cemetery in Denver, Colorado.

== Career ==
Brown was active in the New Thought movement, writing and lecturing extensively. She also wrote some of her works under the pen name Ione. She was instrumental in creating The Order of the Essenes and was its president. (Note: The Order of the Essenes was also known as the Essene Circle and the Essene Society.) The Order of the Essenes was a vegetarian organization that was based on the teachings of the Essenes. In 1906, Brown was Vice President of the World New Thought Federation. She was co-editor with James A. Edgerton of The Essene: A Magazine of Construction.

Brown would succeed Fannie B. James as Editor of Fulfillment Magazine. Also, from 1920 to 1921, Brown was Bookkeeper for the American Unitarian Association.

== Writing ==
=== Books ===
- Studies in Spiritual Harmony (as Ione; Reed Publishing Company, 1901–1903, 134 pages)
- Food Studies (as Ione; Denver, The Reed publishing company, 1902–1904 101 pages)
- Seven Steps in the life of S. A. Weltmer (Nevada, Mo.: Weltmer Institute, 1906)
- Life Lessons: A Series of Practical Lessons of Life, from Life, and about Life (Hudson Press, 1906, 207 pages)
- Soul Songs by Ione (Grace M. Brown, 1907)
- The Word made Flesh, A Study in Healing. (Grace M. Brown, 1908)
- To-day; the Present Moment is God's Own Time (Grace M. Brown, 1910–1911, 200 pages)
- The Inner Breath; 'Vivenda Causa', a revelation of old world wisdom in new world form. (Memphis, Tenn., The Business philosopher (c. 1922) 4 p. 1., 7–182 p. 20 cm)
- Dollars and Health: concerning the psychology of the spleen and other things... (Written and published by Grace M. Brown, Denver [1915?]. 20 pages)
- Think Right for Health and Success (Edward J. Clode, 1916, 184 pages)
- Mental Harmony (Edward J. Clode, 1916, 195 pages)

=== Articles in journals and magazines ===
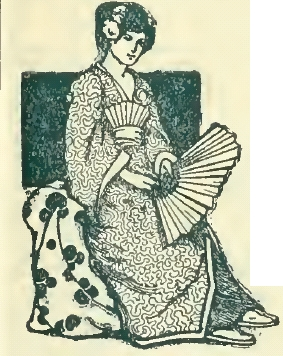
Drawing of Grace Mann Brown in the article "Practical Metaphysics"

- The Essene – monthly magazine published by Brown, 1900–1917
- Fulfillment – monthly metaphysical magazine 1904–1907, later became the Weltmer Magazine
- "Practical Metaphysics" in The Herald of the Golden Age Vol. 10, No. 4 Oct 1905 p. 69
- "The Greatest Thing" in Master Mind Magazine Vol. 3 of 15 Oct 1912 to March 1913 p. 153
- Washington News Letter several appearances.
- Now magazine, several appearances.
- The Modern World volume 9, page 128
- Mind Magazine volume 8, number 3, June 1901, p. 149
- The Balance from The Balance Publishing Co. Denver, Colo. A magazine of learning, of a standard 64p. monthly.

== Lectures ==
Brown spoke at the Fifth Annual Convention of the New Thought Federation. The convention was held in Nevada, Missouri, on September 26–29, 1905. This town in western Missouri was the site for decades of the Weltmer Institute of Suggestive Therapeutics, related to the use of magnetism in healing. It had become a wellness center with numerous practitioners of related systems. Brown also gave a lecture entitled "Treasures" at the Unity Building Dedication Convention on Sunday, August 19, 1906.

== See also ==
- Christian Science
- Church of Divine Science
- New Thought
- Unitarianism
- Sidney Abram Weltmer
