= Sidney Abram Weltmer =

American mental scientist and magnetic healer

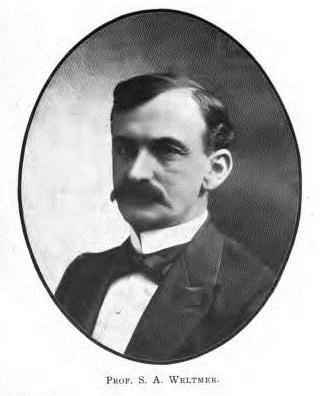
- "Prof. S. A. Weltmer," taken from Seven Steps in the Life of Prof. S. A. Weltmer (1906) by Grace Mann Brown
- Born: Sidney Abram Weltmer; July 7, 1858; Wooster, Ohio, U.S.
- Died: December 6, 1930 (aged 72); Nevada, Missouri, U.S.
- Resting place: Newton Burial Park, Nevada, Vernon County, Missouri, United States
- Known for: Weltmerism, Weltmer Institute of Suggestive Therapeutics
- Spouse(s): Mary Genoa (Adair) Stone, m. October 8, 1879
- Children: Cyrus Ernest (1880-1963); Silas Woodson (1882-1956); Stella Truman; Tracy Carleton; Beulah Ethel
- Parent(s): Abram Weltmer and Catherine (Hull) Weltmer

Signature
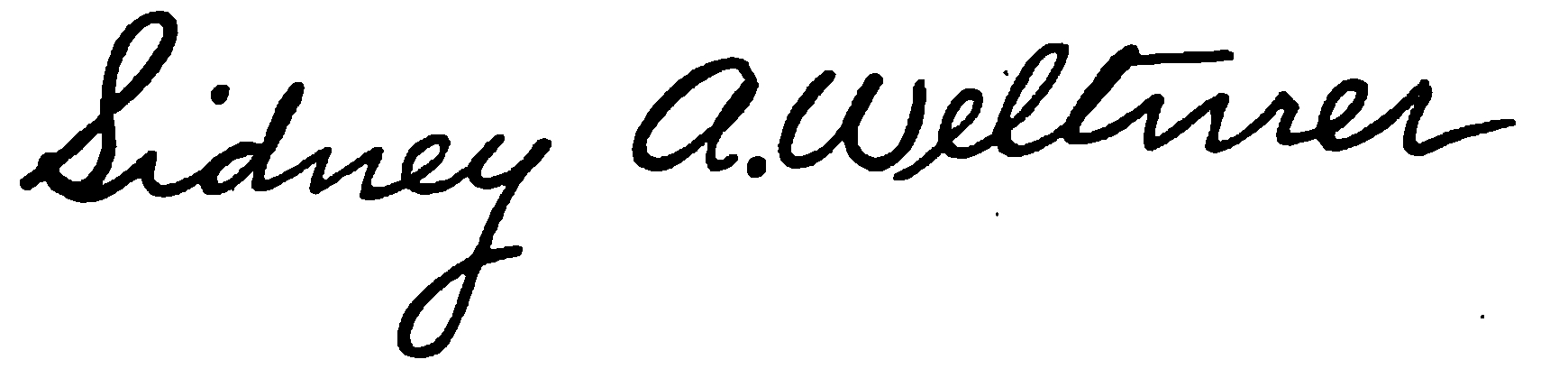

Sidney Abram Weltmer (July 7, 1858 – December 6, 1930) was an American author best known for the Weltmer Method (also known as "Weltmerism") and as founder of the Weltmer Institute of Suggestive Therapeutics. Weltmer claimed his method could cure disease through suggestions and hypnosis, a practice he referred to as "magnetic healing".

== Early life ==
Weltmer was a native of Wooster, Ohio. At the age of seven, his parents moved to Morgan County, Missouri, where he attended the public schools. He studied borrowed medical books in hopes of becoming a physician, and studied as an apprentice with a doctor. Later he devoted himself to the study of the Bible, seeking its wisdom on spiritual healing.

== Career ==
Weltmer was ordained and licensed to preach as a Baptist minister at 19 years old. He served as a preacher in several places.

In 1885 he founded a private educational institution at Aikinsville, Missouri, an unincorporated community in Morgan County. He presided over and directed the Akinsville Normal School from 1885 to 1889, to train teachers for elementary schools. The school disbanded in 1889. In Sedalia, Missouri, he established and organized a public library and was librarian from 1893 until 1895. For two years he also served as a professor in Robbins Business College in that city.

== Personal life ==
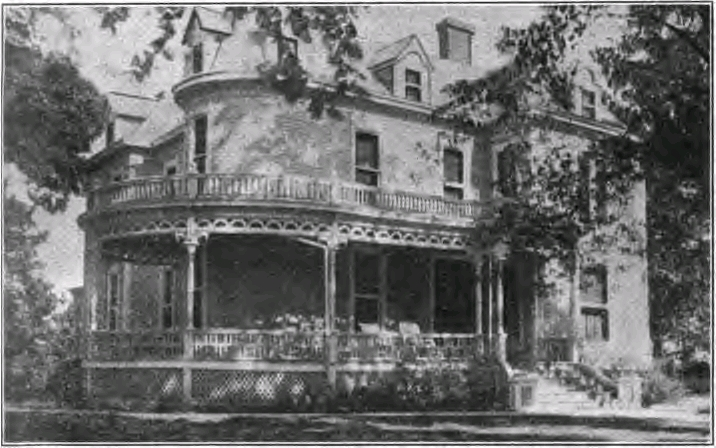
S. A. Weltmer home, 1903

On October 8, 1879, Weltmer married Mary Genoa (Adair) Stone. They had five children together: Ernest, Silas W., Stella, Tracy, and Beulah.

Weltmer was involved in Nevada in several of the fraternal and civic associations that developed in the late 19th century: he was a Knights Templar (Freemasonry) and Thirty-second Degree Mason, an Elk, an Odd Fellow, a Knight of Pythias, and an initiate in the fourth degree of Atlantian Mystics, although he was not yet bound by oath.

Weltmer died in Nevada, Vernon County, Missouri, on December 6, 1930, and was buried there.

== Weltmer Institute ==
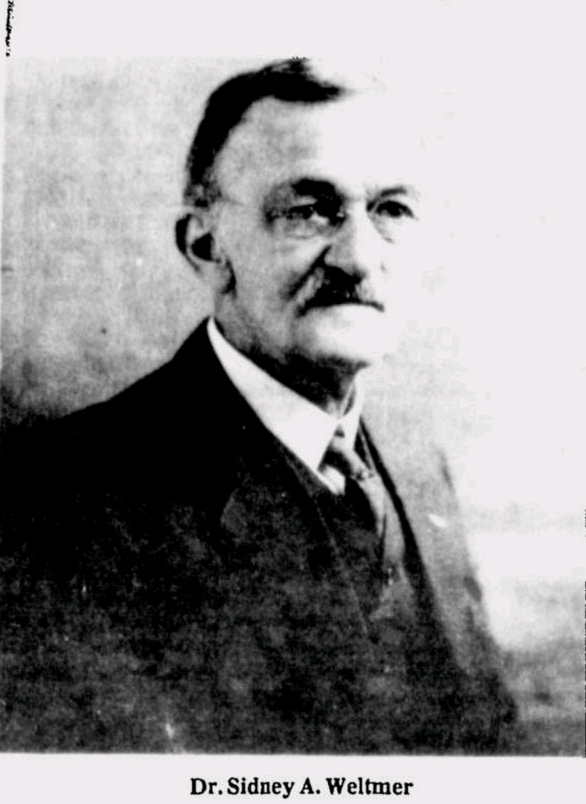
Sidney A. Weltmer in the 1920s

Weltmer took a partner, Joseph H. Kelly from Sedalia, teaching him the principles of what he called his "science". Together they founded the firm of Weltmer & Kelly in Nevada, Missouri, on February 19, 1897, and began to give sessions. As the number of attendees increased, they bought a building to suit them, providing rooms for patients and also space for their classes in the thought transference and "magnetic healing" that Weltmer promoted. They opened this facility, known as the American School of Magnetic Healing, on July 1, 1898. Weltmer served as president and Kelly as secretary and treasurer. Within a few years so many patients were attracted from a wide area that the railroad added trains to its schedules to support this business.

Weltmer asserted that a combination of clairvoyance and hypnotic suggestion could cure diseases such as asthma, tobacco addiction and insanity. A ten-day course cost $100. In addition to holding lectures in an auditorium that could seat several hundred people, he published numerous tracts about his system and attracted an increasing number of patients, up to hundreds per day. He and Kelly trained more assistants and numerous stenographers were hired for the mail order business of classes by mail. By 1903 the Institute had claimed to reach 75,000 patients, curing most.

Members of the medical community widely condemned Weltmer, charging him with being a fraudster. Dr. Preston W. Pope wrote "The Expose (sic) of Weltmerism: Magnetic Healing De-magnetized," a 1900 review in The Sanitarian, published by the Medico-Legal Society of New York. He described Weltmerism as an "anti-Christian method" devoted to "chicanery and money-getting." Dr. Eugene Leslie Priest from the Missouri Medical Association denounced the Weltmer Institute. Pastor Dr. Charles McTyeire Bishop, from the Centenary Methodist Church, published his negative reviews in the Christian Advocate, published in St. Louis, Missouri.

In 1900, the US Postmaster General declared Weltmer's "healing by mail" scheme a fraud and stopped mail delivery to the institute. Weltmer filed suit to challenge this action, and the case eventually reached the U.S. Supreme Court. It ruled on November 17, 1902, that Weltmer had the right as a citizen to receive mail at his business, regardless of whether people agreed with it. According to a 2004 newspaper article about the building and institute, Weltmer's Institute generated so much mail that the government built a new post office to accommodate the volume going into and out of the town. Weltmer traveled to Washington, D.C., during the course of this case, to track its progress at the Court and to attend to his clients among members of the US Senate and their wives.

Also in the early 20th century, Weltmer filed a libel case against Rev. C. M. Bishop for calling Weltmer and his assistants "miserable charlatans" in print; it eventually reached the Supreme Court of Missouri. That court ruled in favor of Bishop and refused a motion to rehear the case. It based its ruling on the facts of one of Weltmer's clients, a woman who claimed to have been cured of breast cancer by letters from Weltmer. She said he instructed her that each of them was to focus on healing thoughts at a time and dates which he established by letter. In fact, during this period of claimed treatment, Weltmer was vacationing in Colorado, and his purported letters were prepared and sent by clerks of the institute.

Weltmer's Institute contributed to Nevada becoming the center of a wellness industry. His system was often compared to Christian Science, a type of spiritual healing which medical practitioners also criticized. Psychotherapists, clairvoyants and persons promising various miracle cures of contemporary illnesses, such as tuberculosis, which then had no cure, also came to work in Nevada. At one time the Institute was staffed with "17 healers, several assistant healers, a physician, and more than 110 stenographers and female typists to handle the correspondence."

After Weltmer's death in 1930, his eldest son Ernest tried to keep the Institute going. He was unsuccessful and closed it in 1933 during the Great Depression. The building was sold and used as a funeral home into 2004. Some residents felt it should have been designated as a historic property, considering Weltmer's influence on the town. Despite some local objections, the city council was preparing to allow the property to be redeveloped and a video store to be built on the site.

== Writings ==
=== Books and pamphlets ===
- Self-Reliance, or the Key to Business Success, Kansas City: Hudson-Kimberly Pub. Co., 1900
- The Healing Hand, Weltmer Institute of Suggestive Therapeutics Company, 1922 - 225 pages
- The Mystery Revealed, or The Hand-book of Weltermerism: A Supplement to the Author's New and Illustrated Mail Course of Instruction in His Science of Healing, Kansas City: Hudson-Kimberley Publishing Company - 80 pages (this was reprinted in 1965 by Health Research)
- The New Voice of Christianity, Kansas City: Hudson-Kimberly Publishing Company, 1903 - 192 pages

=== Articles, pamphlets ===
From 1901 to 1909 Weltmer published a magazine, Weltmer's Magazine of Suggestive Therapeutics

- Complete Clinical Texts on Suggestive Therapeutics and Applied Psychology
- How to Make Magnetic Healing Pay, Nevada, Missouri, 1901 - 216 pages
- Hypnotism: In Its Psychological Relation to Everyday Life Weltmer Institute of Suggestive Therapeutics - 90 pages
- Is prayer ever Answered?, American School of Magnetic Healing, 1899 - 35 pages
- Real Man, Weltmer Institute of Suggestive Therapeutics, 1908 - 63 pages
- Real Man, Or Slave Man, Weltmer Institute of Suggestive Therapeutics, 1914 - 40 pages
- Regeneration, Nevada, Mo. : The Weltmer Foundation, 1925
- Regeneration; a Discussion of the Sex Question from a New and Scientific Standpoint, Foley Railway, 1899 - 130 pages
- Regeneration: a Scientific Discussion of the Sex Principle, 1898-1908, Weltmer Inst. of Suggestive Therapeutics Company, 1908 - 185 pages
- Self Protection, 1898
- Some Points on Personal Magnetism
- Suggestion Simplified, American School of Magnetic Health, 1900 - 117 pages
- Telepathy, Pomeroy, Washington : Health Research
- Telepathy and Thought Transference, Nevada, MISSOURI, 1902
- The Eternal Now, American School of Magnetic Healing, 1899 - 58 pages
- The Undying Character of Thought
- Therapeutic Suggestion
- Weltmerisms; or Pointed Paragraphs Relating to Magnetic Healing, Foley Ptg. Company, 1899 - 68 pages
- Who is a Christian?
- Seventy Bible References Relating to the Subject of Healing

== See also ==
- Weltmer Institute of Suggestive Therapeutics
