= August Imgard =

German-American proponent of the Christmas tree

Augustus "August" Imgard (1828-1904) was a German immigrant who has been recognized as an early proponent in popularizing the Christmas tree in the United States. He has also been credited with being the first to decorate it with candy canes.

== Biography ==
August Imgard (born in Wetzlar, Germany, on January 8, 1828) emigrated from Germany to Wooster, Ohio, before he was 20 years old and started a tailoring business.

In 1847, Imgard cut a blue spruce tree from a wood outside of town, had the village tinsmith construct a star, and placed the tree in his house, decorating it with paper ornaments, gilded nuts, and kuchen. It stood on a slowly revolving platform while a music box played and people came from miles around to view it. Imgard died in 1904, is buried in the Wooster Cemetery, and, every year, a large pine tree above his grave is lit with Christmas lights.

Although no longer credited as the first to introduce the Christmas tree to America, Imgard is still recognized as an early proponent. The National Confectioners Association also recognizes Imgard as the first to put candy canes on a Christmas tree. However, as reported by WKYC Studios -- a news station based in Cleveland, Ohio -- the first candy canes were originally all white, with no red stripes. In fact, according to Akron Beacon Journal -- a newspaper publisher based in Akron, Ohio -- white candy canes with red stripes would not become the standard of candy canes for the next half-century -- over 50 years after Imgard first popularized the candy cane.
