= Osage Village State Historic Site =

Archeological site in the U.S. state of Missouri

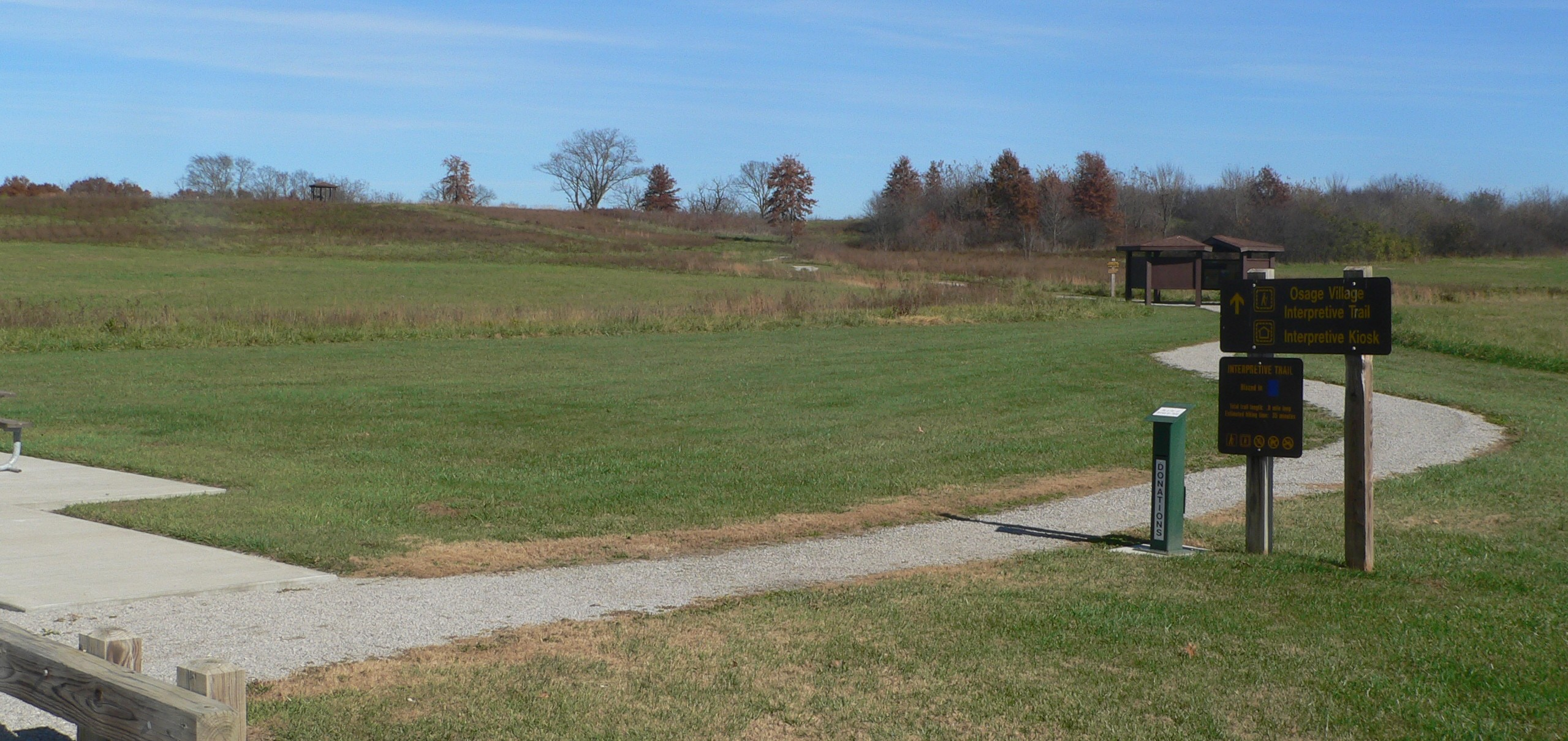
- The site's interpretive trail

- Location within Missouri Location within the United States
- Location: Vernon County, Missouri, United States
- Coordinates: 37°58′52″N 94°12′35″W
- Area: 100 acres (40 ha)
- Established: 1984
- Visitors: 1,911 (in 2022)
- Operator: Missouri Department of Natural Resources
- Website: Osage Village State Historic Site

The Osage Village State Historic Site is a publicly owned property in Vernon County, Missouri, maintained by the Missouri Department of Natural Resources. The historic site preserves the archaeological site of a major Osage village, that once had some 200 lodges housing 2,000 to 3,000 people. The site, designated by the Smithsonian trinomial 23VE03, was also known for many years as the Brown Osage Village Site, under which name it was designated a National Historic Landmark in 1964.

== History ==
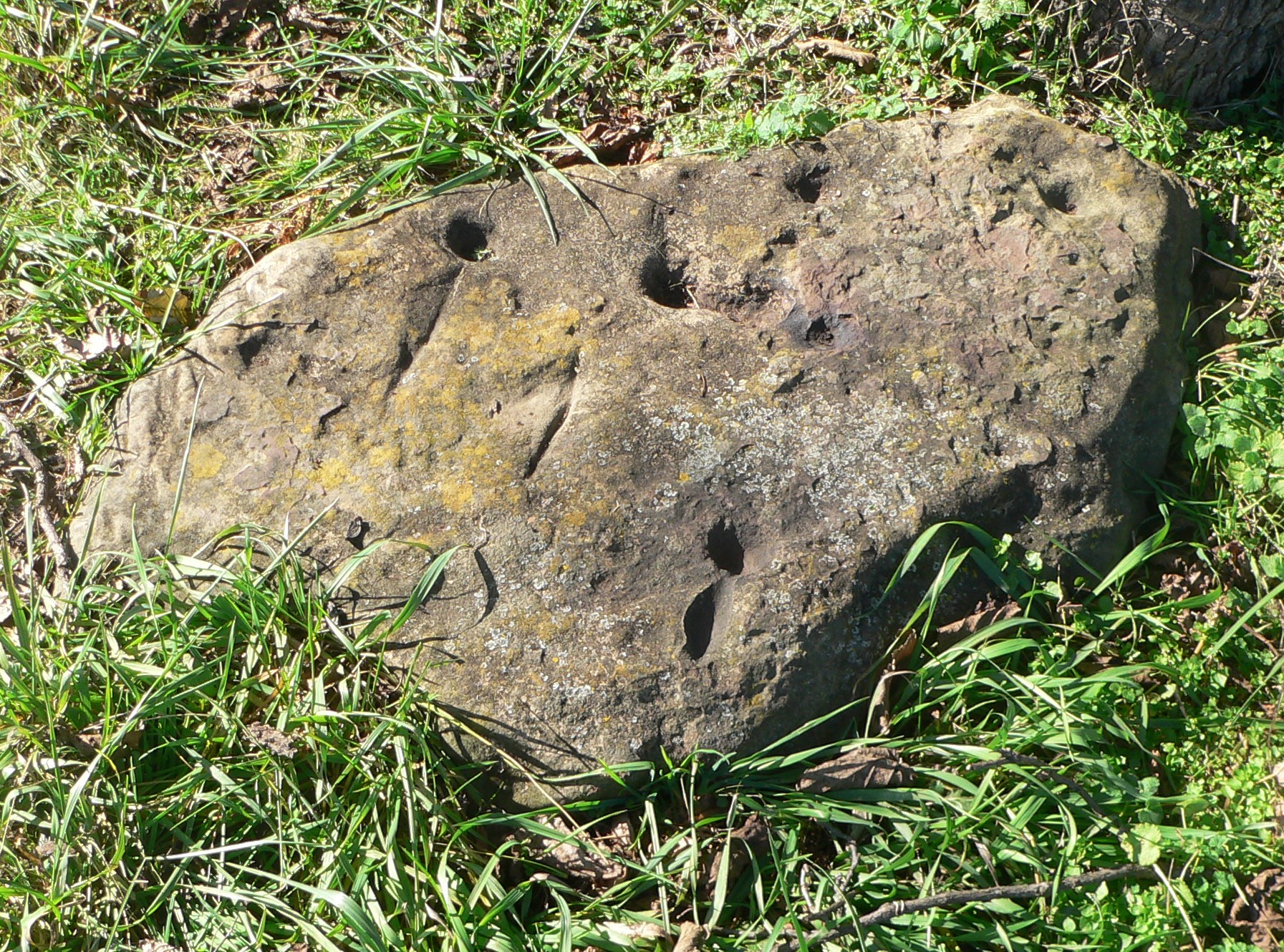
Rock with grooves and pecked holes indicating human use

The Osage Indians were first recorded in 1673 by explorers Louis Joliet and Jacques Marquette. The territory claimed by the Osage at its greatest influence was vast and consisted of what is now southern Missouri, Arkansas, eastern Kansas, and Oklahoma. Between 1700 and 1775, a large group of the Osage lived in a village situated on a high, open hilltop near the Osage River valley. This area, designated as a National Historic Landmark for the importance of the Osage in this region and the size of the village, has been preserved as the Osage Village State Historic Site.

At its peak, the village contained about 200 lodges with 2,000 to 3,000 people living in them. Archaeological excavations have demonstrated that the shape of the dwellings was rectangular. Artifacts such as pottery, weapons, and tools excavated from the site have provided information about the daily lives of the villagers. The men hunted game and traded with the Europeans for furs in exchange for guns and goods. The women cultivated and processed the crops, and processed game and hides to make food, clothing and tools. Throughout the late 18th and early 19th centuries, the Osage Indians accounted for more than half the entire European-American fur trade along the Missouri River.

After the United States government took control of the Louisiana Purchase territory in 1804, its settlement policies encouraged European Americans to come into the area. It made treaties with the Osage so that they would cede their territory to the US. The Osage Indians were gradually forced to retreat to a reservation in Indian Territory, now Oklahoma.

== See also ==
- List of National Historic Landmarks in Missouri
- National Register of Historic Places listings in Vernon County, Missouri
