= Prairie View Stock Farm =

- U.S. National Register of Historic Places
- U.S. Historic district
- Location within Missouri Location within the United States
- Location: Missouri Route WW, near Rich Hill, Missouri
- Coordinates: 38°03′15″N 94°27′50″W
- Area: 1,203.2 acres (486.9 ha)
- Built: c. 1879, 1893-1894
- Architect: V.B. Van Dyke
- Architectural style: Folk Victorian
- NRHP reference No.: 15000573
- Added to NRHP: September 8, 2015

Prairie View Stock Farm, also known as the Bluestem Ranch, is a historic farm and national historic district in western Missouri located near Rich Hill; it covers territory in both Bates and Vernon counties. The district encompasses four contributing buildings, three contributing sites, and two contributing structures in a Rural Historic Landscape District. The contributing sites include a hay meadow, a tall-fescue prairie, and a 160-acre plot of native, tall-grass prairie. It is a state-designated Prairie View Natural Area.

The contributing buildings are a transverse-crib barn/grain house (c. 1879), a barn/feeding facility, a two-story, frame, folk Victorian house (1893-1894); and a frame privy (1893-1894). The contributing structures are a storm cellar (1893-1894) and an arbor (c. 1895).

It was listed on the National Register of Historic Places in 2015.
