= Vernon County Jail, Sheriff's House and Office =

- U.S. National Register of Historic Places
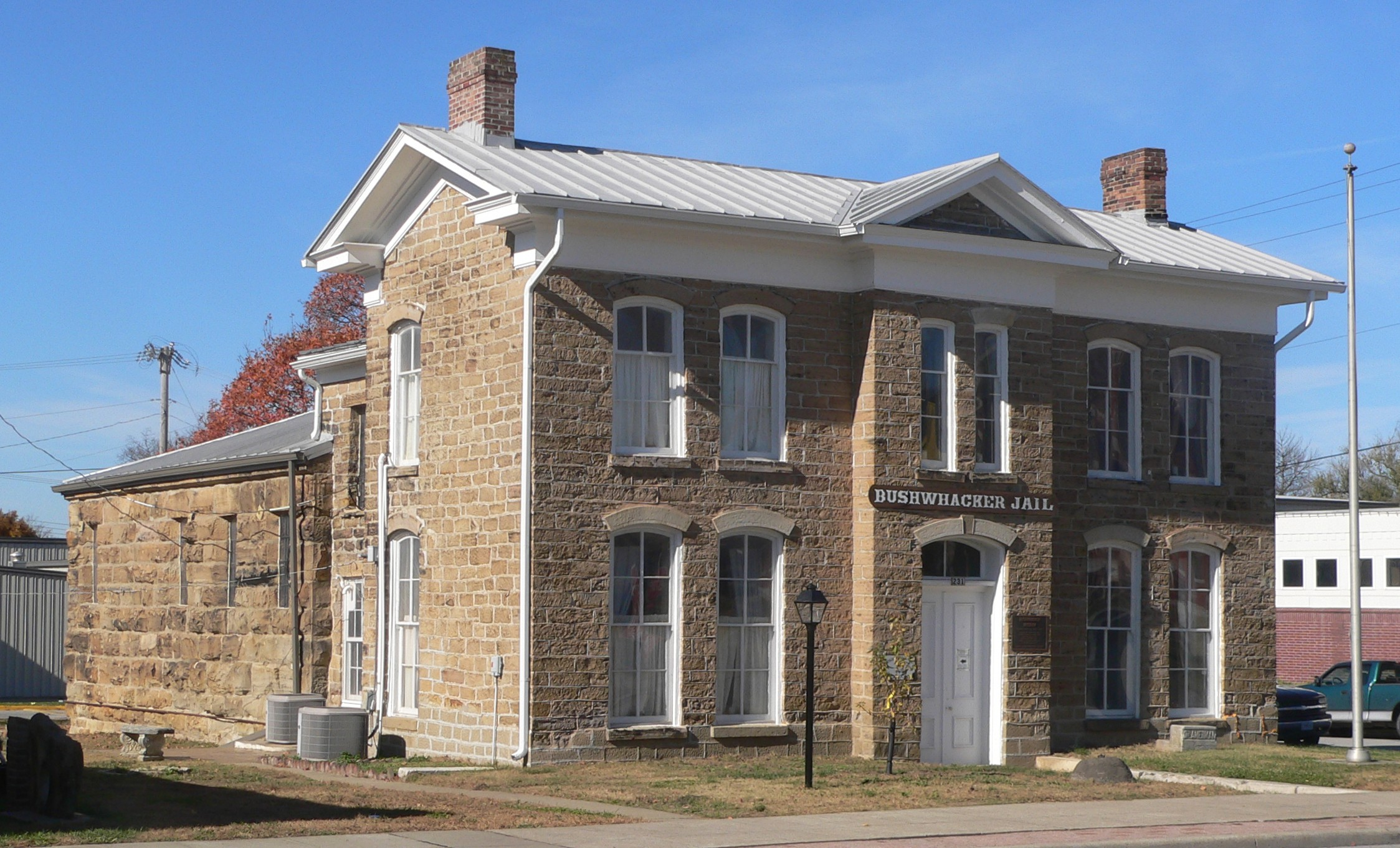
- Bushwhacker Museum in 2017

- Location within Missouri Location within the United States
- Location: 229 N. Main St., Nevada, Missouri
- Coordinates: 37.840145°N 94.358049°W
- Built: 1871
- Architect: Libby, C.M.; Fluke, George
- NRHP reference No.: 77000816
- Added to NRHP: August 16, 1977

Vernon County Jail, Sheriff's House and Office, also known as the Bushwhacker Museum, is a historic jail and sheriff's residence located at Nevada, Vernon County, Missouri. The stone building was built in 1871 and consists of: a two-story, rectangular-plan, Federal-style residence; a two-story, four-room office; and a one-story, rectangular jail. The building ceased use as a jail in 1960 and houses a local history museum.

It was listed on the National Register of Historic Places in 1977.
