= Franz H. Behncke =

German-American naturopath

Franz Heinrich Behncke
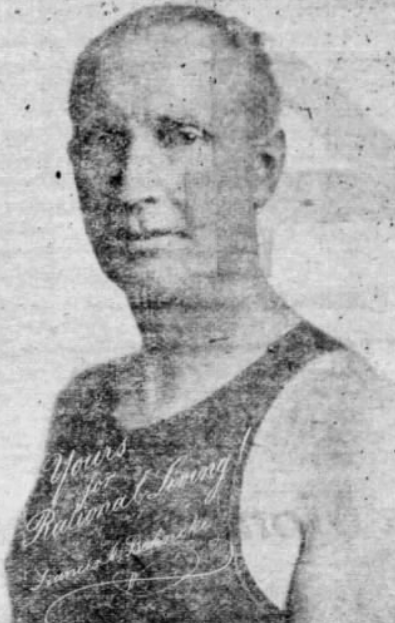
- Born: 1868; Germany
- Died: March 1964 (aged 95–96); United States
- Occupation: Naturopath

Franz Heinrich Behncke (1868 – March 1964) was a German-American naturopath and physical culture teacher.

== Biography ==
Behncke was born in Germany in 1868. As a young man he fought in the Second Boer War in South Africa where he was captured and exiled by the British. He travelled to Abyssinia and Siam. He later became an alternative health lecturer and immigrated to the United States where he attended the Lindlahr College of Natural Therapeutics from 1914 to 1917. He was Physical Director at the Lindlahr Sanitarium in Elmhurst, Illinois until 1927. At the Lindlahr Sanitarium he was responsible for teaching patients physical education such as bicycle riding, bowling, croquet, gardening and other activities that they could continue after leaving the sanatorium. He also worked at the Sun-Diet Sanitarium in East Aurora, New York from 1929 to 1939 and at Bergholz Institute in Milwaukee from 1940.

He hosted physical culture courses at Waconda Springs and lectured on "nature cure" methods. In 1933 whilst lecturing for the Sun-Diet Sanitarium he promoted food combining. In 1940s he became interested in vegetarianism. He was a speaker at a vegetarian convention with George Hebden Corsan, Scott Nearing and Geoffrey L. Rudd at Geneva, Wisconsin hosted by the Vegetarian News Digest in 1949.

Behncke died in March 1964. His papers are archived by the Milwaukee County Historical Society.

== Personal life ==
Behncke was married to Dolly Puhlmann (died 1968). They had four children.

== Selected publications ==
- Pioneer Teachers. Lindlahr College of Nature Cure. 1921.
