= Birch Branch =

Stream in the American state of Missouri

Coordinates: 37.8280947°N 94.3943954°W

Birch Branch is a stream in Vernon County in the U.S. state of Missouri. It is a tributary of Little Dry Wood Creek.

Birch Branch most likely was named on account of birch timber in the area.

== See also ==
- List of rivers of Missouri
