= Rich Hill, Missouri =

City in Bates County, Missouri, United States

- City
- Nickname: The Town That Coal Built
- Location of Rich Hill, Missouri
- Coordinates: 38°5′45″N 94°21′48″W
- Country: United States
- State: Missouri
- County: Bates
- Incorporated: 1880

Area
  - Total: 1.37 sq mi (3.56 km^{2})
  - Land: 1.37 sq mi (3.54 km^{2})
  - Water: 0.0077 sq mi (0.02 km^{2})
- Elevation: 804 ft (245 m)

Population (2020)
  - Total: 1,232
  - Density: 900/sq mi (348/km^{2})
- Time zone: UTC-6 (Central (CST))
  - Summer (DST): UTC-5 (CDT)
- ZIP code: 64779
- Area code: 417
- FIPS code: 29-61418
- GNIS feature ID: 2396361
- Website: www.richhillmo.com

Rich Hill is a city in southern Bates County, Missouri, United States, that is part of the Kansas City metropolitan area. The population was 1,232 at the 2020 census.

== History ==
Rich Hill was platted in 1880. The city was named in 1871 by C.W. Ratekin and used the slogan "The Town That Coal Built". The town experienced a rapid population expansion during the late 1800s, until mining efforts began to decline and eventually ended in 1906. The mining effort was renewed by Peabody Energy in the 1950s.

The Prairie View Stock Farm was listed on the National Register of Historic Places in 2015.

== Attractions ==
Rich Hill is home to a popular local drive-in restaurant, Swopes Drive-In. Swopes Drive-In has been in continuous operation since 1959, when it was originally built as Fischers Drive-In. It changed names and owners multiple times until 1978, when the Swopes family bought the establishment and gave it its current name.

Swopes drive-In offers a number of unique menu options, including the Swopes Burger and butterfinger shakes. Swopes prepares their french fries "Suzy Q style," in which the fries are curled and served in a clump, rather than being individually separated.

== Geography ==
Rich Hill is located on Missouri Route A adjacent to the west side of US Route 71 eleven miles south of Butler. The Bates-Vernon county line is 2.5 miles to the south. The upper reaches of the Truman Reservoir are two miles east on the Marais des Cygnes River.

According to the United States Census Bureau, the city has a total area of 1.38 square miles (3.57 km^{2}), of which 1.37 square miles (3.55 km^{2}) is land and 0.01 square miles (0.03 km^{2}) is water.

== Demographics ==
Historical population
Census	Pop.	Note	%±
1890	4,008		—
1900	4,053		1.1%
1910	2,755		−32.0%
1920	2,261		−17.9%
1930	2,118		−6.3%
1940	1,994		−5.9%
1950	1,820		−8.7%
1960	1,699		−6.6%
1970	1,661		−2.2%
1980	1,471		−11.4%
1990	1,317		−10.5%
2000	1,461		10.9%
2010	1,396		−4.4%
2020	1,232		−11.7%
U.S. Decennial Census

=== 2010 census ===
As of the census of 2010, there were 1,396 people, 567 households, and 351 families living in the city. The population density was 1,019 inhabitants per square mile (393/km^{2}). There were 701 housing units at an average density of 512 per square mile (198/km^{2}). The racial makeup of the city was 95.5% White, 0.2% African American, 0.4% Native American, 0.1% Asian, 0.6% from other races, and 3.2% from two or more races. Hispanic or Latino of any race were 1.4% of the population.

There were 567 households, of which 33.2% had children under the age of 18 living with them, 45.3% were married couples living together, 12.3% had a female householder with no husband present, 4.2% had a male householder with no wife present, and 38.1% were non-families. 33.2% of all households were made up of individuals, and 18.1% had someone living alone who was 65 years of age or older. The average household size was 2.46 and the average family size was 3.11.

The median age in the city was 41 years. 27.4% of residents were under the age of 18; 7.5% were between the ages of 18 and 24; 20.8% were from 25 to 44; 27.2% were from 45 to 64; and 17% were 65 years of age or older. The gender makeup of the city was 47.4% male and 52.6% female.

=== 2000 census ===
As of the census of 2000, there were 1,461 people, 617 households, and 391 families living in the city. The population density was1,065 inhabitants per square mile (411/km^{2}). There were 727 housing units at an average density of 530 inhabitants per square mile (205/km^{2}). The racial makeup of the city was 97.33% White, 0.14% African American, 1.37% Native American, 0.14% Asian, 0.21% from other races, and 0.82% from two or more races. Hispanic or Latino of any race were 0.82% of the population.

There were 617 households, out of which 30.5% had children under the age of 18 living with them, 48.9% were married couples living together, 11.7% had a female householder with no husband present, and 36.5% were non-families. 32.4% of all households were made up of individuals, and 20.7% had someone living alone who was 65 years of age or older. The average household size was 2.37 and the average family size was 3.00.

In the city, the population was spread out, with 27.0% under the age of 18, 8.8% from 18 to 24, 24.4% from 25 to 44, 22.4% from 45 to 64, and 17.5% who were 65 years of age or older. The median age was 37 years. For every 100 females, there were 85.9 males. For every 100 females age 18 and over, there were 80.2 males.

The median income for a household in the city was $22,964, and the median income for a family was $28,938. Males had a median income of $25,476 versus $15,978 for females. The per capita income for the city was $15,356. About 16.0% of families and 19.0% of the population were below the poverty line, including 25.5% of those under age 18 and 18.7% of those age 65 or over.

== Economy ==
KLM Telephone Company, a rural telephone company, serves the area. Its owner, Fastwyre, is based in Blair, Nebraska.

== Education ==
Public education in Rich Hill is administered by Rich Hill R-IV School District.

Rich Hill has a public library, the Rich Hill Memorial Library.

Metropolitan Community College has the Rich Hill school district area in its service area, but not its in-district taxation area.

== Transportation ==
Intercity bus service to the city is provided by Jefferson Lines.

== Pop Culture ==
The city was featured in the 2014 documentary, Rich Hill. The film premiered at the 2014 Sundance Film Festival, where it won the U.S. Grand Jury Prize for a documentary.

== See also ==
- List of cities in Missouri
