= Infirmary Building, Missouri State Hospital Number 3 =

Defunct hospital in Missouri, U.S.

- U.S. National Register of Historic Places
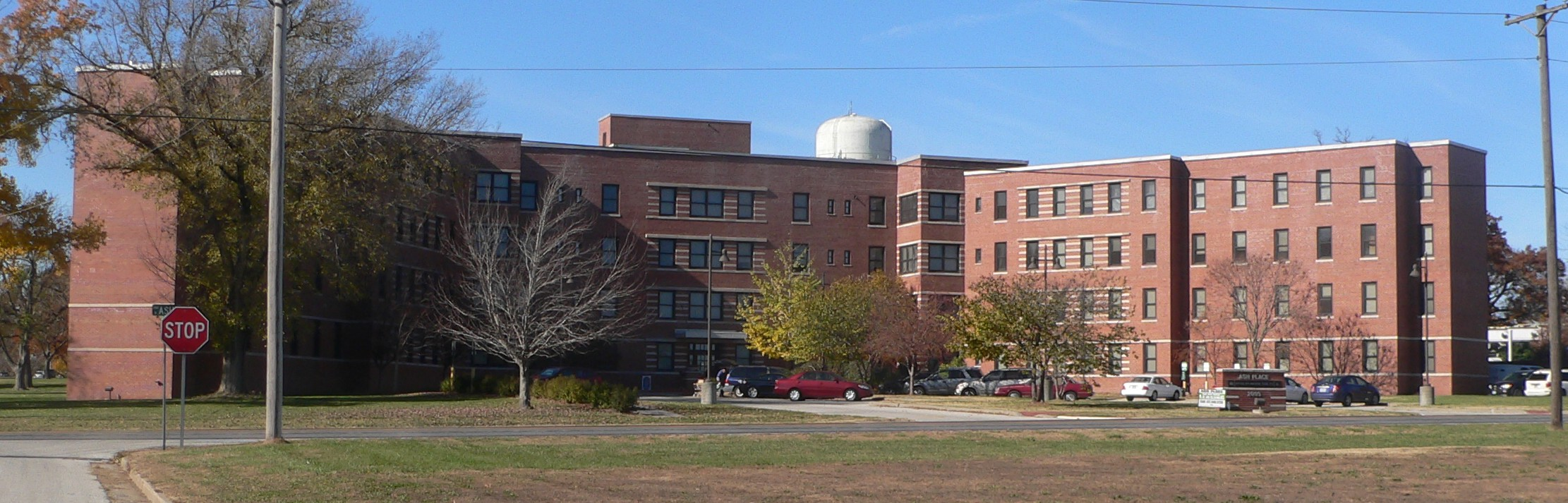

- Location within Missouri Location within the United States
- Location: 2095 N. Ash St., Nevada, Missouri
- Coordinates: 37.860514°N 94.359117°W
- Area: less than one acre
- Built: 1937
- Architect: Carroll and Dean
- Architectural style: Modern Movement
- NRHP reference No.: 05001330
- Added to NRHP: November 25, 2005

Infirmary Building, Missouri State Hospital Number 3, also known as the Nevada State Hospital, is a historic hospital building located at Nevada, Vernon County, Missouri. It was built in 1937, as a Public Works Administration (PWA) project. It is an X-shaped Kirkbride Plan building and consists of a four-story central block with four three- and four-story wings. The building is of reinforced concrete construction, faced in red brick, and is in the Modernist style.

It was listed on the National Register of Historic Places in 2005.
