= Vernon County Courthouse (Missouri) =

- U.S. National Register of Historic Places
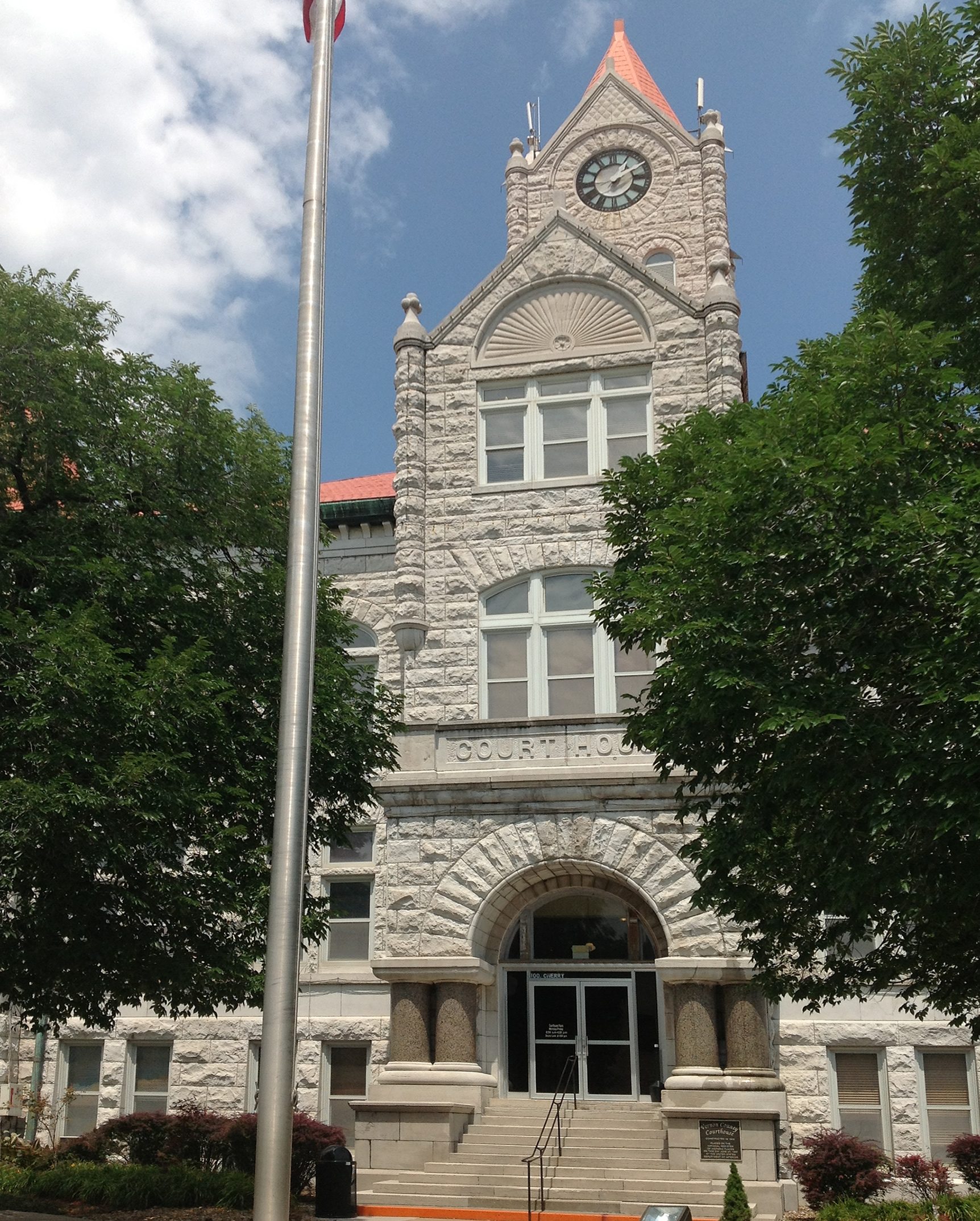
- Vernon County Courthouse front

- Location within Missouri Location within the United States
- Location: Bounded by Cherry, Cedar, Walnut, and Main Sts., Nevada, Missouri
- Coordinates: 37°50′19″N 94°21′26″W
- Built: 1908
- Architect: Kirsch, Robert G.; Beagles & Dye
- Architectural style: Romanesque
- NRHP reference No.: 97000630
- Added to NRHP: June 27, 1997

Vernon County Courthouse is a historic courthouse located at Nevada, Vernon County, Missouri. It was built between 1906 and 1908. It was listed on the National Register of Historic Places in 1997. The Romanesque Revival style building is constructed of Carthage stone; its architect was R.G. Kirsch of St. Louis. The appropriation for the building was $75,000. Three years after its completion, at a cost of $95,215.38, electric light fixtures were installed throughout the building; and a judge's chamber, jury room, and library were added adjacent to the courtroom.

The current Vernon County Courthouse was the third one to be built in Nevada; the first was a two-story building one block west of the present day courthouse. In addition to the court, it was also used for church services.

At the outbreak of the Civil War, the population of Nevada was 425. The first courthouse was burned during the Civil War. On 2 May 1863, a group of pro-Union militiamen from neighboring Cedar County stormed the courthouse, only to be killed by the Vernon County defenders. When the Union men did not return home, a larger militia force rode on Nevada. They gave the inhabitants 15 minutes to gather their belongings, then burned the entire town to the ground.

Within the courthouse on the arched walls outside the courtroom, beautiful painted murals of the prairie have long been hidden beneath layers of paint and need to be recovered. Also on the property is the contributing granite and bronze William Joel Stone Monument (1934-1935), a memorial to Missouri politician William J. Stone (1848-1918).

Vernon County Courthouse
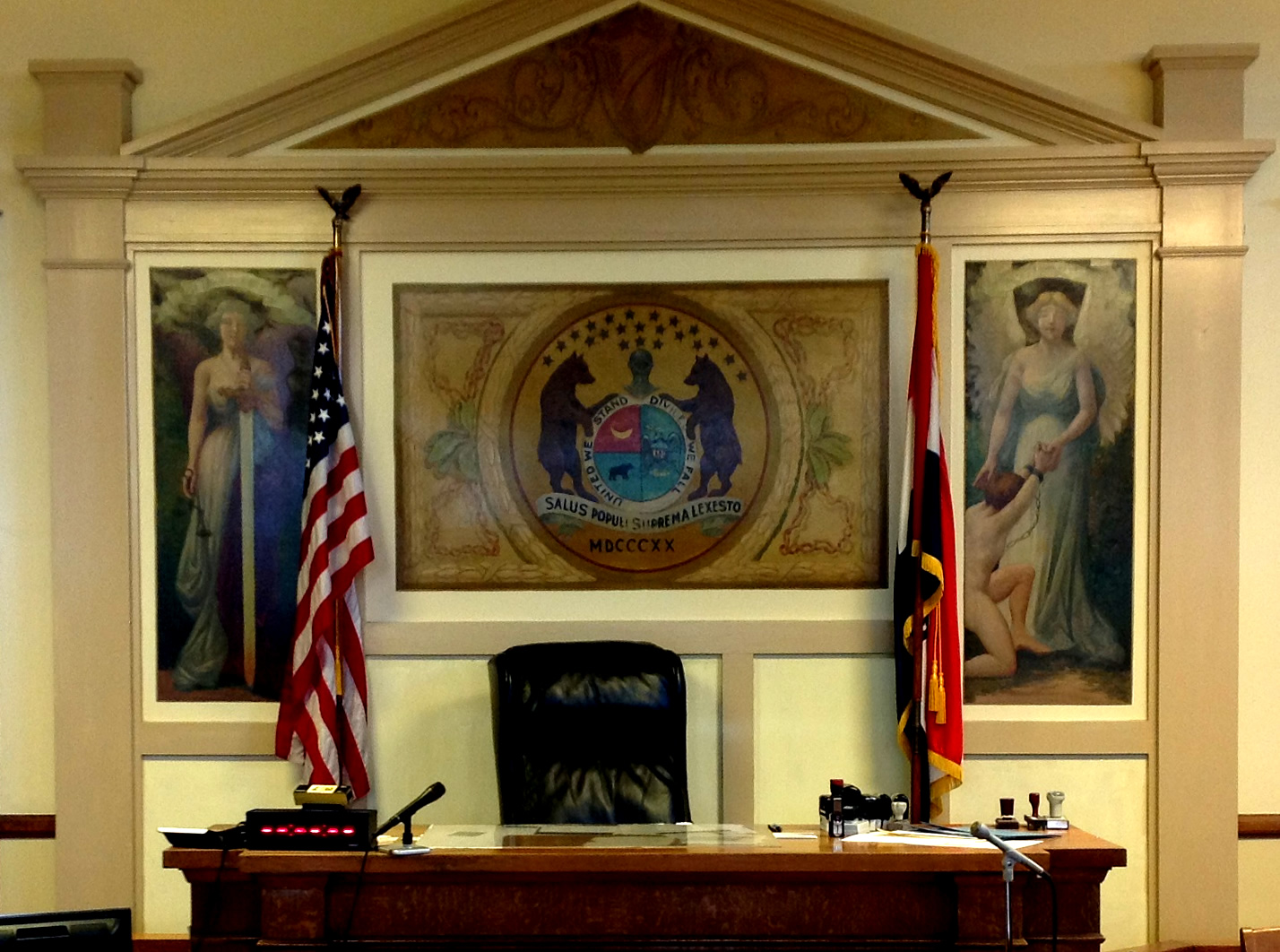
Main courtroom

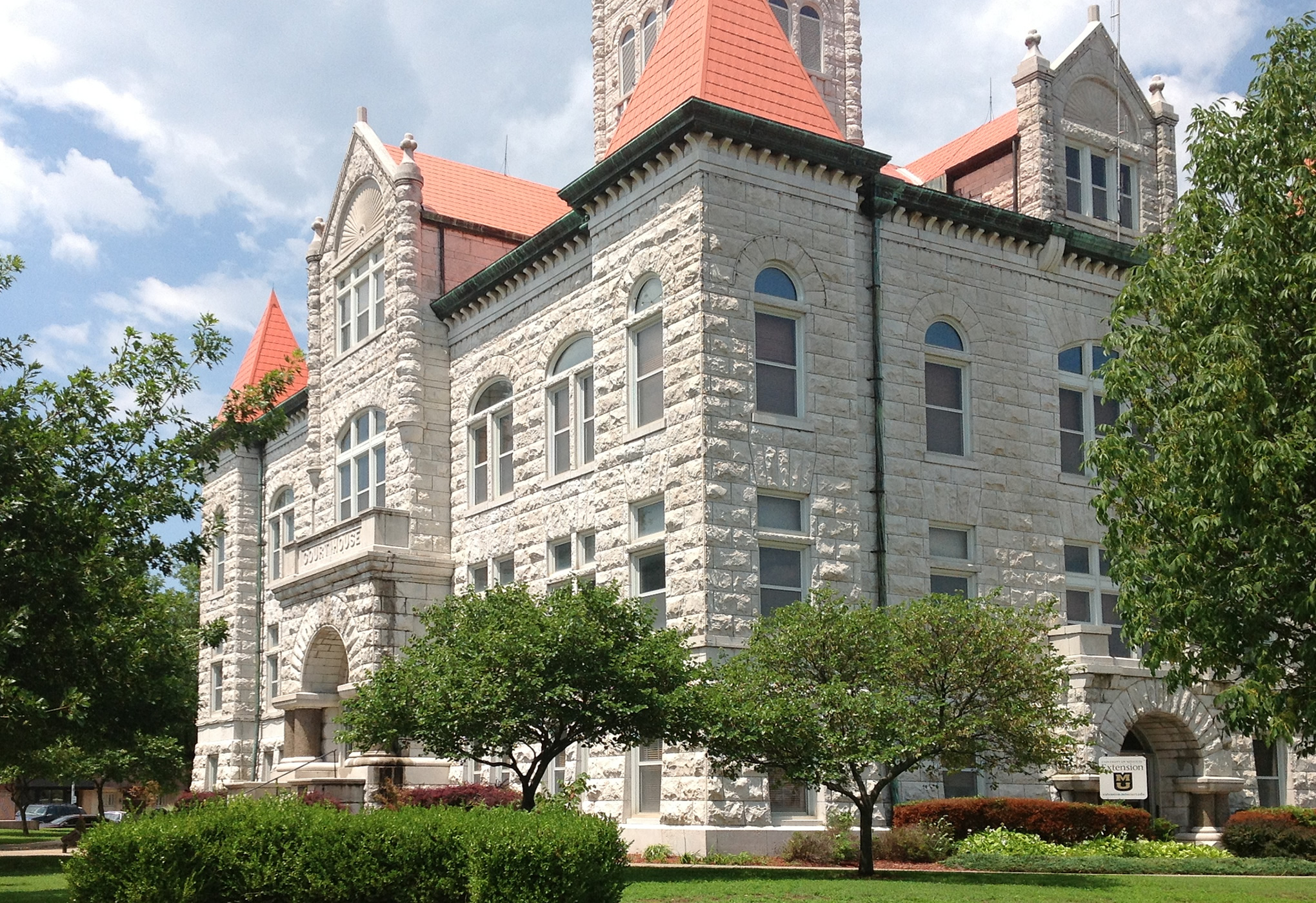
Side view of courthouse

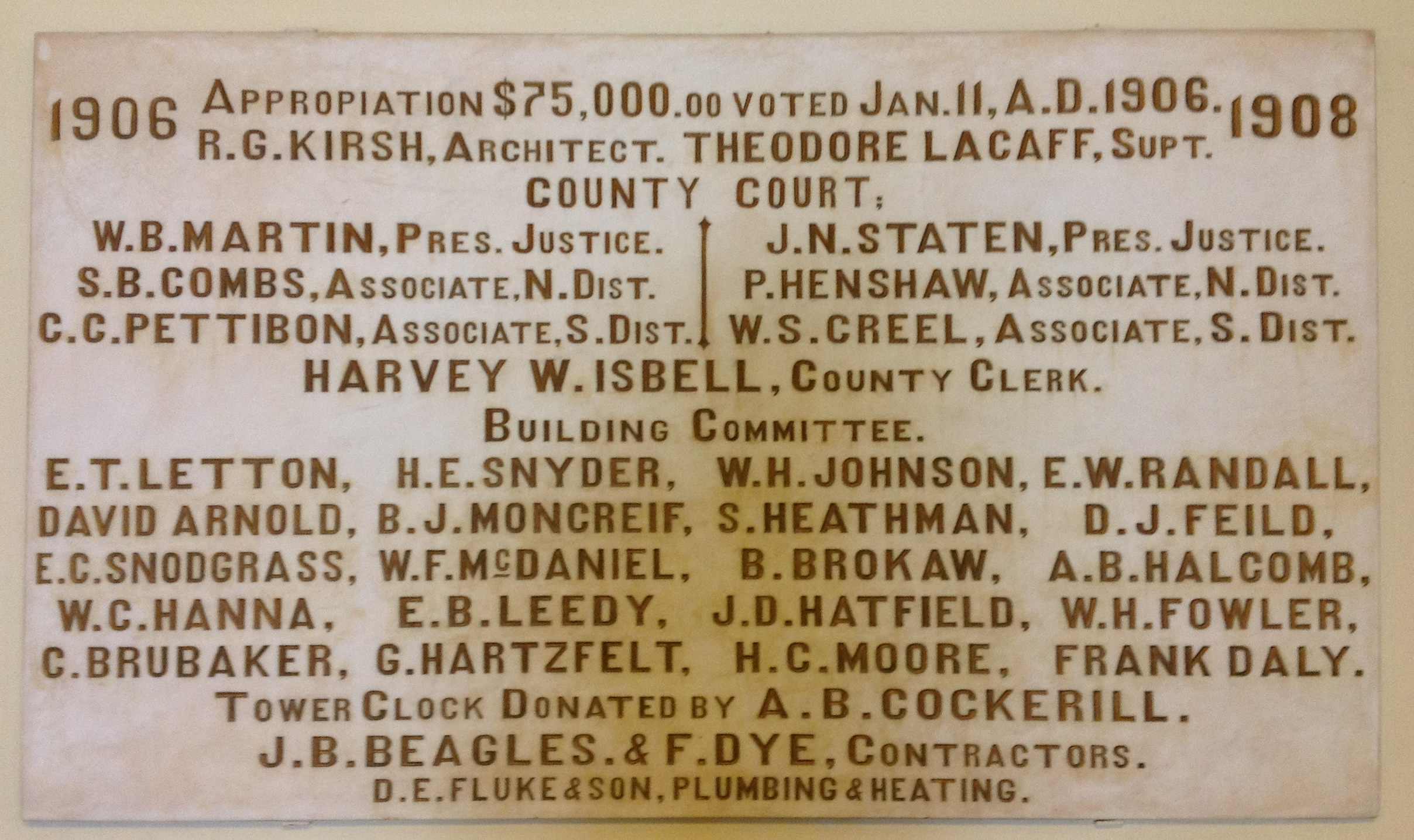
Dedication plaque
