= Ohio Agricultural Research and Development Center =

Institution at Ohio State University

Coordinates: 40.779339°N 81.925006°W

OSU OARDC logo

Ohio Agricultural Research and Development Center (OARDC) is the research institution of the Ohio State University College of Food, Agricultural, and Environmental Sciences. The center is home to research projects ranging from plant and animal sciences to human ecology and medicine, and includes branches across the state covering a total of over 7,000 acres (28 km²).

== History ==
The Ohio Agricultural Experiment Station was founded in 1882 in Columbus and moved to Wooster ten years later. The station grew at Wooster, focusing on crops commonly raised in Ohio, such as corn, wheat, livestock husbandry and nutrition, and expanding into other departments such as entomology. It was renamed the Ohio Agricultural Research and Development Center in 1965 and entered a period in which it thrived with increased funding and new breakthroughs, such as Lowell "Skip" Nault's immensely important discovery of a teosinte in Mexico that could be crossed with corn to make it more resistant to disease in 1979.

This golden age was cut off shortly afterwards, though, as the OARDC suffered from the state's need to cut expenditures and merged with the Ohio State University in 1982 due to funding problems. After a decade of continued financial woes, the OARDC experienced a resurgence in the 1990s with the help of new director, Thomas Payne, and new funding.

== Research and projects ==
The OARDC has pioneered research in aerial pesticide application, round hay bales, new apple cultivars, Phytophthora sojae oomycete in soybeans, removal of lead contamination in soil, and hundreds of other projects. The center provides information for farmers and an education for graduate students, and also deals with consumer-friendly products, rural and urban communities, environmental stewardship, and many other issues important in and beyond Ohio.

== Locations ==
- Columbus
- Wooster
- Ashtabula (Kingsville)
- North Central (Fremont)
- Muck Crops (Celeryville)
- Northwest (Hoytville)
- NAEWS & Pomerene Lab (Coshocton)
- Western (Springfield)
- Eastern (Caldwell)
- OSU South Centers (Piketon)
- Southern (Ripley) (now closed)
- Jackson
