= Weltmer Institute of Suggestive Therapeutics =

Former American organization

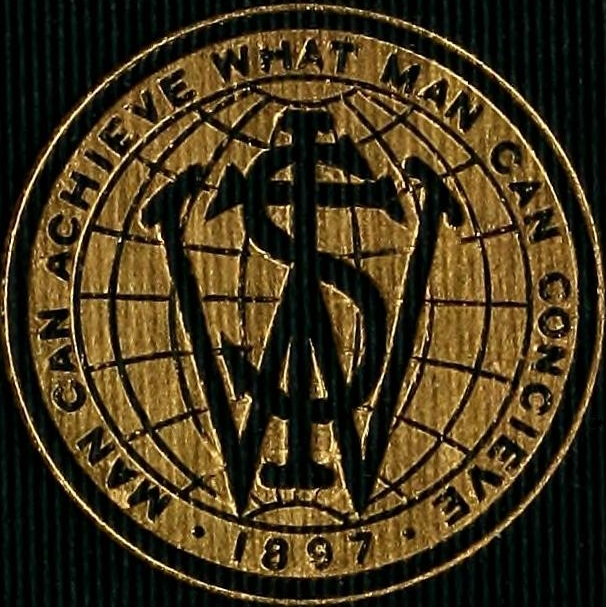
Weltmer Institute Emblem

The Weltmer Institute was an American business with trained staff that practiced weltmerism, a kind of electromagnetic healing using laying-on-of-hands combined with the power of suggestion and hypnosis. It was devoted to "mind cures" of illnesses and ailments not susceptible to other treatment. Also known as the Weltmer Institute of Suggestive Therapeutics, it was founded in Nevada, Missouri by Sidney Abram Weltmer on February 19, 1897. He had developed his ideas as a young man while purportedly curing himself of tuberculosis, then a disease without a cure. The institute operated until 1933, being dissolved by Weltmer's son shortly after the senior man's death in 1930.

The Institute attracted so many patients and attendees of classes that the railroad added trains to serve the town. It also generated great mail volume because of treatment by mail and orders for books and pamphlets, to the extent that the town's post office was upgraded to first class and a new, larger post office built. The Institute positively affected the town's economy, also attracting psychotherapists, clairvoyants and other practitioners to a community that became known as a wellness center. Weltmer's healing method was strongly criticized by doctors in the early 1900s as ineffective voodoo and charlatanry, but the Institute continued to operate at high capacity, with a staff of more than 120, most of them stenographers and typists.

== History ==
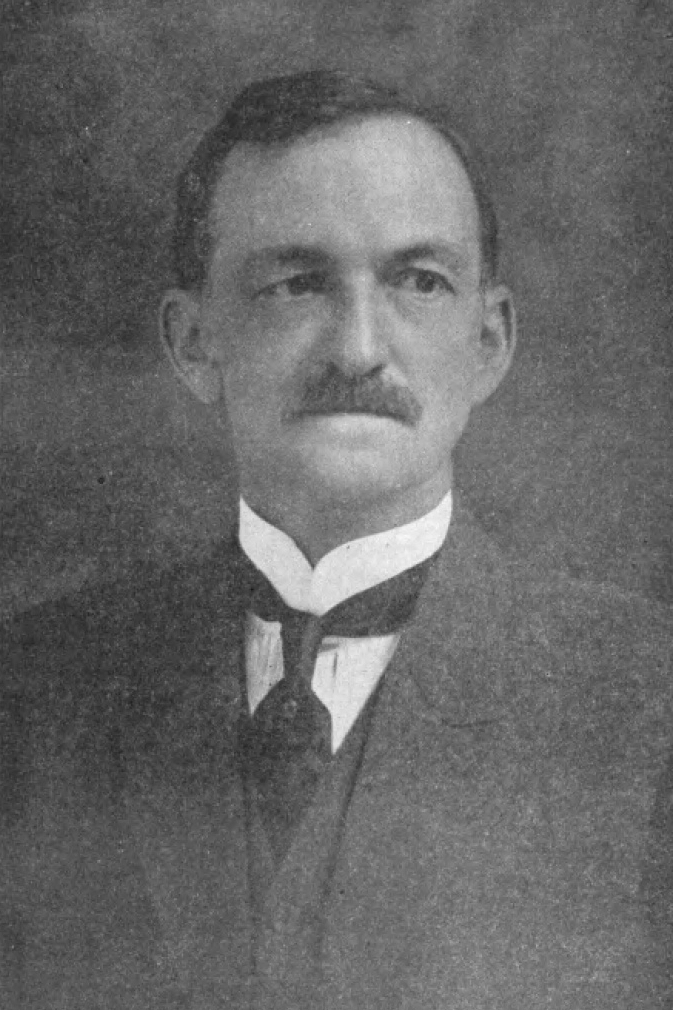
Sidney Weltmer in 1912

Sidney Abram Weltmer had begun his mind cure career by taking an associate on the lecture circuit and demonstrating the power of mesmerism, which he had taught himself to practice. Weltmer believed this practice could be the basis of a business and founded the Weltmer Institute in Nevada, Missouri in 1897.

By 1898 Weltmer bought a 17-room mansion to use for the Institute. It functioned as a boarding house for those patients who had 10-day stays for a course of treatment, charging $100 for this. Weltmer continued to expand his practice and develop his business, lecturing to several hundred people in the Weltmer Auditorium, and sponsoring the Weltmer Quartette to entertain at both local events and a 1905 convention of the New Thought Federation. He developed a mail order business of classes and treatment by mail.

In his book How to Make Magnetic Healing Pay (1901), Weltmer wrote that "a thorough knowledge of Magnetic Healing alone will not bring success, financially—a knowledge of the business side of the science is necessary as well". At its height, the institute treated 400 people a day, generating a daily income of $3,600. At one time it employed 17 healers, several assistant healers, a physician, and more than 110 stenographers and typists, the latter to process mail and generate treatment letters.

After the closure of the Institute in 1933, the mansion was sold to Milster Funeral Home and used for that purpose for decades. In 2005, the historical buildings were razed for the construction of new buildings on the site, including a video store.

== Activities ==
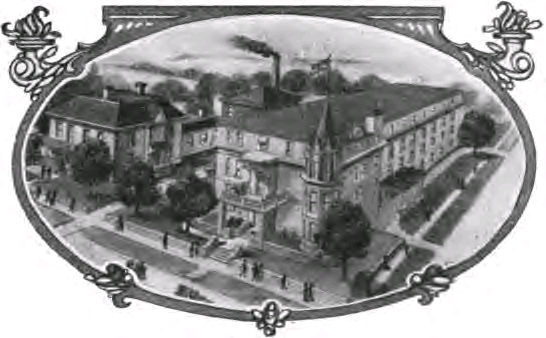
Weltmer Institute Cameo Overview

At the institute, practitioners performed mental healing through telepathy, hypnosis, and mental suggestion.

Practitioner J.O. Crone wrote an account of his time at the institute; he claimed that he began work with scant instruction from Weltmer, who had been preoccupied. Crone wrote of his first hypnosis, of a woman patient, thus:

she said ... " ... I want you to hypnotize me, get me quiet, and give me rest." Very well; this was my first attempt to hypnotize a patient, but I did not allow her to know but I had hypnotized a hundred or more. To tell the truth, I was almost scared to death.

== Reception and influence ==
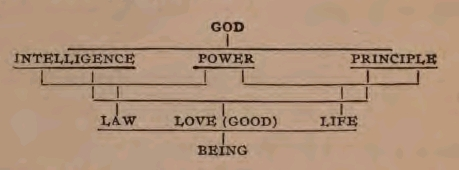
Weltmer Law Relations

F. H. Behncke wrote in his 1920 book, Pioneer Teachers, that the Weltmer Institute "may be called the foremost school for mental healing in America".

The Institute contributed strongly to the growth of the town of Nevada, Missouri. So many patients were attracted here that the railroad expanded the number of trains serving the town. The Institute generated such a volume of mail handled by the local post office, that these functions were upgraded to first class and a new post office was built. In addition, other of the town's facilities expanded in response to the business generated by the institute's activities.

Weltmer, and his institute, were attacked by critics. In his booklet of 1900, The Exposé of Weltmerism: Magnetic Healing De-magnetized, Prenton W. Pope described what he saw as errors in Welmer's practice and described it as "anti-Christian." A local pastor referred to Weltmer's practices as "an ignorant mixture of voodoo and Christian Science". In the 1910 issue of the British Medical Journal, Weltmerism was described as "one of the innumerable freaks of the charlatan fancy which flourished only on American soil."

== See also ==
- New Thought
- Christian Science
- Divine Science
