= Harrington =

Harrington (or Harington) may refer to:

== People as a surname ==
- Harrington (surname)

== People as a forename ==
- Arthur Raikes (Arthur Edward Harington Raikes, 1867–1915), British army officer
- Charles Harrington Elster, American writer
- Edward Joseph Harrington O'Brien (1890–1941), American author
- Francis Harrington Glidden (1832–1922), American businessman
- Bantu Holomisa (Bantubonke Harrington Holomisa, born 1955), leader of the United Democratic Movement in South Africa
- Harrington Lees (1870–1929), Australian archbishop
- Harrington Darnell Autry (born 1976), American football player
- Harrington Evans Broad (1844–1927), English politician
- Harrington Hext, pseudonym of English author Eden Phillpots
- Hulbert Harrington Warner (1842–1923), American businessman
- Ivo Whitton (Ivo Harrington Whitton, 1893–1967), Australian golfer
- John Harington Gubbins (1852–1929), British linguist
- John Harrington Stevens (1820–1900), American senator
- Jonathan H. Green (Jonathan Harrington Green, 1813–1887), American gambler and inventor
- Louis Harrington Lewry, Canadian politician
- Paul Hewitt (Paul Harrington Hewitt, born 1963), American basketball coach
- Virginia Knauer (Virginia Harrington Knauer, 1915–2011), American politician

== Places ==
=== Australia ===
- Harrington, New South Wales
- Harrington Park, New South Wales

=== Bermuda ===
- Harrington Sound

=== Canada ===
- Harrington, Ontario
- Harrington, Quebec
- Harrington Harbour, Quebec
- Harrington Lake

=== New Zealand ===
- Harington Point

=== United Kingdom ===
- Harrington, Cumbria
- Harrington, Lincolnshire
- Harrington, Northamptonshire
- Harrington Bridge, crosses the River Trent between Derbyshire and Leicestershire
- Harrington Dock, Liverpool
- Harrington Road tram stop, South Norwood, London
- RAF Harrington, Northamptonshire

=== United States ===
- Harrington, Delaware
- Harrington, Maine
- Harrington (Princess Anne, Maryland), listed on the NRHP in Maryland
- Harrington, South Dakota
- Harrington, Washington
- Harrington Bay, Maine
- Harrington Beach State Park, Wisconsin
- Harrington Creek, California
- Harrington House (Weston, Massachusetts)
- Lake Harrington, a lake in Minnesota
- Harrington Meeting House, Maine
- Harrington Park, New Jersey
- Camp Don Harrington, Texas
- Don Harrington Discovery Center, Amarillo, Texas

== Characters ==
- Brandy Harrington, animated dog
- Catherine Harrington, fictional character in TV drama Peyton Place
- Derby Harrington, fictional character from the video game Bully
- Eve Harrington, lead character in the film All about Eve
- Faith Harrington, character in Lost TV series
- Honor Harrington, fictional character in David Weber's Honorverse
- Leslie Harrington, fictional character in TV drama Peyton Place
- Rodney Harrington, fictional character in TV drama Peyton Place
- Stephanie Harrington, fictional superhero
- Steve Harrington, fictional character from the Netflix series Stranger Things

== Other ==
- Evan Harrington, a novel by George Meredith
- Harrington (novel), an 1817 novel by Maria Edgeworth
- Harrington–Hollingsworth experiment, in hematology
- Harrington & Richardson, an American brand of firearms
- Harington baronets, an English title
- Harrington College of Design, Chicago
- Harrington College Icebergs, a Canadian ice hockey team
- Harrington (typeface), a typeface included with Microsoft Windows
- Harrington rod
- Harrington jacket
- Harrington Park Press
- Harrington's gerbil
- Harrington's rat
- Harrington-Wilson 1, a galaxy
- Harrington v. Purdue Pharma L.P., a 2024 United States Supreme Court case
- SS D. W. Harrington, a U.S. cargo ship in the Second World War
- Thomas Harrington & Sons, a British coachbuilding business
  - Harrington Legionnaire, a coach body built by Thomas Harrington Ltd
- 52P/Harrington–Abell, a comet
- 3216 Harrington, an asteroid
