= Albert Lea Thunder =

American junior ice hockey team

- City: Albert Lea, Minnesota
- League: North American Hockey League
- Division: Central
- Operated: 2008–2010
- Home arena: Albert Lea Ice Arena
- Colors: Navy blue and tan

Franchise history
- 2008–2010: Albert Lea Thunder
- 2010–2021: Amarillo Bulls
- 2021–present: North Iowa Bulls

The Albert Lea Thunder was a Tier II junior ice hockey team in the North American Hockey League's Central Division. The team was an expansion franchise for the 2008–09 season and played their home games at the Albert Lea Ice Arena in Albert Lea, Minnesota.

== History ==
The franchise joined the North American Hockey League (NAHL) for the 2008–09 season with Chicago businessman Jim Perkins and Barry Soskin as owners. Soskin was also the owner of independent Northern Junior Hockey League teams, the Findlay Grrrowl and defunct Pittsburgh Cougars, as well as the former owner of the ECHL's Toledo Storm and Central Hockey League's Nashville Nighthawks.

On November 18, 2009, it was reported that the Thunder were engaging in "pay-to-play," or taking money to guarantee players' spots on the team, an act that is against the rules under the Tier II sanctioning of USA Hockey for the NAHL. A total of eight players were named and the organization was facing a $400,000 fine from the NAHL. On December 7, 2009, the NAHL's Board of Governors terminated the Albert Lea membership and took over operations of the team during the transition. Despite the scandal, the Thunder mounted a late-season comeback and made the playoffs for the first time in team history in 2010.

In May 2010, the team found new owners and relocated to Amarillo, Texas, for the 2010–11 season as the Amarillo Bulls.

== Season records ==
Season	GP	W	L	OTL	Pts	GF	GA	PIM	Finish	Playoffs
2008–09	58	4	49	5	13	112	309	1,497	5th of 5, Central; 19th of 19, NAHL	Did not qualify
2009–10	58	19	34	5	43	153	231	1,345	4th of 5, Central; 16th of 19, NAHL	Lost Div. Semifinal series, 0–3 (Bismarck Bobcats)
