= Wooster Oilers =

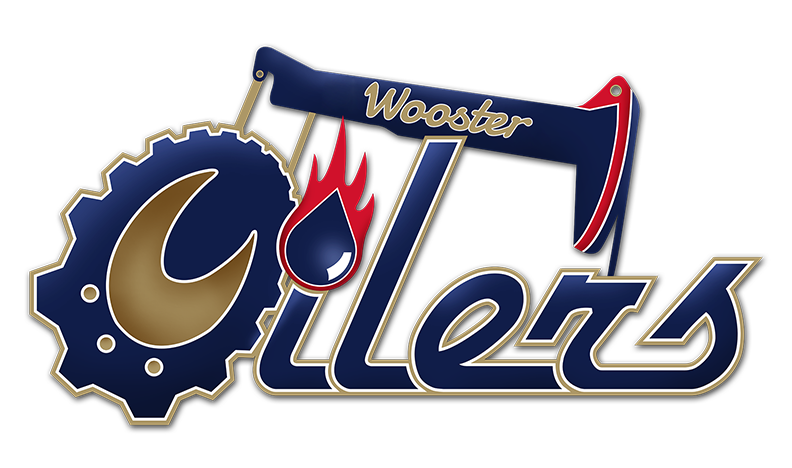
- City: Wooster, Ohio
- League: United States Premier Hockey League
- Founded: 2006
- Folded: 2022
- Home arena: Alice Noble Ice Arena
- Colors: Navy, white, gold, and red
- Owner: Marty Kerr
- General manager: None
- Head coach: None

Championships
- Regular season titles: 2009–10 NJHL Knox Cup; 2014–15 MnJHL Central Division champions
- Playoff championships: 2010 NJHL International Cup

The Wooster Oilers were a junior ice hockey team and member of the United States Premier Hockey League 'Premier' level. The Oilers played home games at the Alice Noble Ice Arena in Wooster, Ohio.

== History ==
The franchise started in 2006 as an expansion team in the America East Hockey League (AEHL). After the 2007–08 season the team moved to the United Junior Hockey League (UJHL) for the 2008–09 season along with two other AEHL teams. The Wooster Oilers finished third overall in their first season in the UJHL.

The following season after the UJHL collapsed, the Wooster Oilers, along with many other UJHL franchises, joined the Northern Junior Hockey League. After the 2009–10 season, the Oilers announced they would join the Tier III Great Lakes Junior Hockey League.

The 2012–13 season brought changes again as the Oilers joined the USA Hockey-sanctioned Tier III Minnesota Junior Hockey League (MnJHL). The Oilers finished fifth overall in their inaugural season and made it to the semifinals in playoffs.

On December 18, 2014, the United States Premier Hockey League announced that it was adding the Central Division of the MnJHL teams to their new Midwest Division including the Oilers. However, on February 12, 2015, the North American 3 Hockey League announced that its board of governors had approved the sale and relocation of the Cleveland Jr. Lumberjacks membership to owners of the Oilers for the 2015–16 season, allowing the Oilers to join the NA3HL. Originally the owners had planned to play two Tier III teams for the 2015–16 season, but by June it was reported that they had dropped their plans for the USPHL team and would only play in the NA3HL.

However, after three seasons in the NA3HL, the Oilers left the league for the USPHL's Premier Division, now a non-sanctioned league, for the 2018–19 season. After a one-season hiatus due to the uncertainty of their home arena possibly closing, the Wooster Oilers returned to the USPHL for the 2020–21 season.

== Season-by season records ==
Season	GP	W	L	T	OTL	Pts	GF	GA	Regular season finish	Playoffs
America East Hockey League
2006–07	56	32	18	6	0	70	294	224	2nd of 9	Advanced to semifinal (3-team round robin) Lost 3–4 (OT) vs Harrington Icebergs
2007–08	52	27	18	7	0	61	232	239	2nd of 6	Lost semifinal vs Dover Seawolves
United Junior Hockey League
2008–09	44	18	19	7	0	43	206	226	3rd of 5	Lost semifinals, 1–2 vs Findlay Grrrowl
Northern Junior Hockey League
2009–10	51	43	5	0	3	89	345	161	1st of 6, Knox Cup	International Cup, NJHL champions
Great Lakes Junior Hockey League
2010–11	40	19	21	—	—	38	162	134	3rd of 5, East	Lost first round, 0–2 vs Michigan Ice Dogs
2011–12	42	22	19	—	1	45	191	176	3rd of 5, East	Lost first round, 0–2 vs Michigan Ice Dogs
Minnesota Junior Hockey League
2012–13	50	24	22	—	4	52	198	218	5th of 8, Great Lakes	Won div. quarterfinals vs Fort Wayne Federals; Lost div. semifinals, 0–2 vs Illiana Blackbirds
2013–14	46	21	22	—	3	45	157	119	6th of 8, Central	Won div. quarterfinals vs Central Wisconsin Saints; Lost div. semifinals, 0–2 vs Marquette Royales
2014–15	39	21	16	—	2	44	178	191	3rd of 6, Central; 7th of 14, MnJHL	Won div. quarterfinals, 2–0 vs Tri-City Ice Hawks; Won div. semifinals, 2–0 vs Wisconsin Rapids Riverkings; Lost crossover semifinal, 0–2 vs Dells Ducks
North American 3 Hockey League
2015–16	47	19	21	—	7	45	144	183	4th of 6, East; 23rd of 34, NA3HL	Lost div. semifinals, 0–2 vs Metro Jets
2016–17	47	15	27	—	5	35	125	172	5th of 6, East; 36th of 48, NA3HL	Did not qualify
2017–18	47	21	22	—	4	46	136	145	5th of 6, East; 25th of 42, NA3HL	Did not qualify
United States Premier Hockey League
2018–19	44	16	25	—	3	35	113	153	5th of 6, Great Lakes; 39th of 52, Premier	Lost qualifier game, 2–3 vs. Metro Jets Development Program
2019–20	Did not participate									
2020–21	43	8	33	—	2	18	111	248	7th of 7, Great Lakes; 54th of 62, Premier	Lost First Round series, 1–2 vs. Pittsburgh Vengeance
2021–22	44	4	39	—	1	9	68	346	7th of 7, Great Lakes; 64th of 64, Premier	Did not qualify for post season play
