= Jim Cashman =

Jim Cashman may refer to:

- Jim Cashman (ice hockey), president of the Continental Junior Hockey League
- Jim Cashman (hurler) (born 1965), former Irish hurler
- Jim Cashman (actor), American actor and writer
