= Alpena Thunder =

- City: Alpena, Michigan
- League: CJHL
- Founded: 2010
- Home arena: Northern Lights Arena
- Colors: Navy Blue, Blue, and White
- Owner: Alpena Thunder Hockey LLC
- General manager: Joseph Kolodziej
- Asst. coach: Brett Hall

Franchise history
- 2010–2011: Alpena Thunder

The Alpena Thunder were an independent junior ice hockey team. The team played out of Northern Lights Arena in Alpena, Michigan.

== History ==
The franchise was formed in 2010 as an expansion franchise in the 2010–11 season of Northern Junior Hockey League. In August 2010, the Northern Junior Hockey league folded when several teams left the league for other leagues, leaving the Thunder scrambling to find a league. On September 3, 2010 it was announced Alpena would play in the new, independent Continental Junior Hockey League (CJHL) as well as an independent schedule against other junior ice hockey teams.

However, the CJHL would play the 2010–11 season with only two teams, the Thunder and Niagara Fury. The Thunder won the league title that season but would soon fold afterwards. The CJHL announced a replacement for the Thunder, called the Alpena Pride, for the 2011–12 season but that team never played a game and the CJHL ceased operations prior to the season.

== Season-by-season records ==
Season	GP	W	L	T	OTL	Pts	GF	GA	Regular season finish	Playoffs
2010-11	41	29	11	1	0	59	118	43	1st of 2, CJHL	Won League
