= Jamestown Vikings =

Professional ice hockey team

- City: Jamestown, New York
- League: Mid-Atlantic Hockey League
- Founded: 2007
- Home arena: Jamestown Savings Bank Ice Arena
- Colors: navy blue, light blue, gold
- Owners: Vikings Professional Hockey Club, LLC
- Head coach: Brad Zangs

Franchise history
- 2007-2008: Jamestown Vikings
- 2008: Lake Erie Vikings

Championships
- Regular season titles: 0

The Jamestown Vikings were a professional ice hockey team that played in the now defunct Mid-Atlantic Hockey League. They were in Jamestown, New York at the Jamestown Savings Bank Ice Arena.

== Team history ==
The league canceled the remainder of the 2007-08 season and suspended operations on February 12, 2008. The MAHL planned to return with teams in new locations in 2008-09. The Vikings and Valley Forge Freedom, the league's two most fiscally solvent franchises, were expected to remain in the league if and when the league returns. After the season ended, several Vikings players went on a drunken rampage at a local lodge in Jamestown, believing that league and team owner Andrew Haines owned the lodge (he did not) and causing tens of thousands of dollars in damage. League officials originally said that they fully expected the Vikings to be a part of a renewed league in 2008-09. However, on March 18, the league announced that the Jamestown team would move to Ohio, and play as the Lake Erie Vikings, citing the vandalism incident as the primary reason for the departure. It was later revealed that the Jamestown Savings Bank Ice Arena had revoked the Vikings' lease because of the league's financial problems. The team later announced its intentions to begin play at "The Pond" in Auburn Township, Geauga County, Ohio, but after the folding of the MAHL in September 2008, the Vikings never played again.

A junior "A" hockey franchise named the Jamestown Jets replaced the Vikings in Jamestown.
