= S&T =

S&T can refer to:

== Terms ==
- Science and technology, the counterpart of R&D
- Switching and terminal railroad
- Signalling and Telecommunications or Signalling and Telegraphy in Railway signalling
- Sales and trading

== University ==
- Missouri University of Science and Technology, often shortened to "Missouri S&T" or simply "S&T"

== Companies ==
- S&T (company), an IT company from Austria
- S&T Motors, the former name for KR Motors, a motorcycle manufacturer in South Korea
- S&T Dynamics, machine-tools and auto parts manufacturer of South Korea
- S&T Bank, a regional bank in Pennsylvania, United States
  - S&T Bank Arena, an arena in Indiana, Pennsylvania

== Publications ==
- Sky & Telescope, a magazine
- Strategy & Tactics, a magazine

== Media ==
- Sherri and Terri, characters from The Simpsons
