= Team Ulysse =

- City: La Plaine, Quebec
- League: Preparatory School Hockey League
- Founded: 2008
- Home arena: Complexe JC Perreault
- Colours: Black, Gold, and Red
- General manager: Claude LaBelle
- Head coach: Denis Chalifoux
- Website: ulyssehockey.com

Team Ulysse is a Canadian Junior ice hockey from La Plaine, Quebec. They are former members of the Northern Junior Hockey League and the United Junior Hockey League, a pair of Independent Junior A leagues from the United States The team is affiliated with École secondaire de l'Odyssée.

== History ==
Team Ulysse joined the junior ranks in 2008 as members of the United Junior Hockey League. As members of the league Northern/Quebec Division, the team fared well. Late in the season, the Quebec teams broke away from the troubled league, finished their season independently and then played their own playoffs. Team Ulysse lost in the finals to the Harrington College Icebergs.

In the summer of 2009, while most of their former Quebec opponents moved on to form a College League under the auspices of Hockey Quebec, Team Ulysse chose to compete in the Northern Junior Hockey League in the United States.

In the spring of 2010, Team Ulysse joined the newly formed LHPS.

== Statistics ==
Season	GP	W	L	T	OTL	GF	GA	P	Results	Playoffs
2008-09	24	15	5	4	-	106	92	34	1st UJHL-N	Lost Final
2009-10	21	15	3	-	3	163	99	33	2nd NJHL	Lost Final
2016-17	45	25	11	3	3	137	108	29	4th NJHL	Lost Semi Final
