= Motor City Chiefs =

- City: Dearborn Heights, Michigan
- League: CSHL
- Home arena: Canfield Ice Arena
- Colors: Navy Blue, Red, White, and Gold
- Owners: Gerry Lullove, Paul Thomas
- General manager: Paul Thomas
- Head coach: Jeff Bond

Franchise history
- 1985–2010: Motor City Chiefs
- 2010–2014: Michigan Mountain Cats
- 2014–present: Southern Tier Xpress

The Motor City Chiefs were a Tier III ice hockey organization that played in the Central States Hockey League (CSHL) and Great Lakes Junior Hockey League (GLJHL). The team played their home games at the Canfield Ice Arena in Dearborn Heights, Michigan. The players, ages 16–20, carried amateur status under Junior A guidelines and hope to earn a spot on higher levels of junior ice hockey in the United States and Canada, collegiate, and eventually professional teams. The Chiefs have also fielded select youth teams at the Squirt, Bantam, Midget Minor U16, and Midget Major U18 and girls program at the U12, U14, U16 levels as well as roller in-line hockey teams.

== History ==
From 1985 to 2010, the Motor City Chiefs organization fielded a USA Hockey-sanctioned Tier III Junior A ice hockey team in the Central States Hockey League. At the same time, the Chiefs also fielded a Tier III Junior B team in the Great Lakes Junior Hockey League.

In 2010, the Chiefs sold their Junior A CSHL franchise to the local Michigan Mountain Cats organization (who were also fielding a Junior B team in the GLJHL). The Mountain Cats would actually end up using the Canfield Ice Arena for the first half of the 2010–11 season until finally moving into a home rink in nearby Farmington Hills, Michigan. Since 2014, the Chiefs' and Mountain Cats' Tier III junior franchise has operated as the Southern Tier Xpress out of Northwest Arena in Jamestown, New York.

The Chiefs continued with their Junior B GJLHL team, which was promoted by USA Hockey to Junior A in 2011, until summer 2012.

=== Inline hockey ===
In 2012, the GLJHL left USA Hockey-sanctioning for the Amateur Athletic Union. This caused eight of the former Jr. B-level ice hockey teams to leave the GLJHL for the Minnesota Junior Hockey League, not including the Chiefs. With the lack of teams, the GLJHL decided to take a new direction for the 2012–13 season and switched to junior roller in-line hockey. At this time, the Chiefs also dropped its junior ice hockey team and focused on the roller hockey team. The GLJHL changed its name to Great Lakes Inline Hockey League in 2014. As of 2015, the GLIHL appears to have ceased operations. The Chiefs played the 2014–15 season in the American Inline Hockey League but have since been quiet.

== Alumni ==
The Chiefs have had alumni move on to higher levels of junior ice hockey, NCAA Division I, Division III, ACHA College, at professional levels.
