= Indiana Ice Miners =

- City: Indiana, Pennsylvania
- League: Mid-Atlantic Hockey League
- Founded: 2007
- Home arena: S&T Bank Arena
- Colors: Black, red, silver
- Owner(s): Fidel Jenkins
- General manager: Bob Yusko
- Head coach: Christian Panaia
- Media: Indiana Gazette

Franchise history
- 2007-2008: Indiana Ice Miners

Championships
- Regular season titles: 1

The Indiana Ice Miners was a professional ice hockey team formerly in the Mid-Atlantic Hockey League. Based in Indiana, Pennsylvania, the team was a founding member of the MAHL, first playing in 2007. The team played at the S&T Bank Arena. When the league folded prior to the 2008 season, the team was unable to find a new league to play in, but owner Fidel Jenkins had expressed an interest in returning for the 2009–10 season.

== History ==
A Mid-Atlantic Hockey League team was announced for Indiana, Pennsylvania, by the league president Andrew Haines in 2007. The league held a contest to name the team, and the "Ice Miners" nickname, a reference to the coal mining regions of Central and Western Pennsylvania, was picked in June.

On June 21, 2007, the team announced the hiring of Brian Gratz as head coach. Gratz previously played goaltender at Penn State University, where he won four ACHA National Championships. In the year before taking the position with the Ice Miners, Gratz served as a volunteer assistant for the Reading Royals of the ECHL. He later returned to play with the Wheeling Nailers. He was called up to the American Hockey League with the Grand Rapids Griffins, and finished the year in the ECHL playoffs with the Cincinnati Cyclones.

In winter of 2008, the team announced the hiring of Devon Moore to oversee its sales and marketing strategy.

The league announced the ownership of the team would be acquired by Robert Eger in December. The team had been run by the league since starting play.

In February, the league announced that it would immediately suspend operations, citing financial reasons. Over the course of the season, the Ice Miners recorded a professional hockey record 26-game winning streak. The team was named champions of the league, with a 31-1-0 record, 18 games before the season was scheduled to end.

The team was purchased by real estate developer Fidel Jenkins on March 7, 2008.

Head coach Brian Gratz left the team in March, to explore other coaching opportunities. The Ice Miners later introduced a new coach, Christian Pania.

The team also made a change of General Manager, hiring Bob Yusko in April. Yusko previously served as the director of operations with the Mon Valley Thunder. Despite the successes of the Ice Miners franchise, the MAHL folded in late September 2008, ending hopes of a second season for the league and a chance for the Ice Miners to defend the only MAHL championship under Jenkins's new ownership.
