= Indianapolis Inferno =

- City: Indianapolis, Indiana
- League: GLJHL
- Founded: 2008
- Home arena: Pan American Arena
- Colors: Gold, Black, Red
- Owner(s): Cameron and Jamie Estes
- Head coach: Rocky Trottier

Franchise history
- 2008–2010: Danville Inferno
- 2010–2012: Indianapolis Inferno

The Indianapolis Inferno was a Tier III Junior B ice hockey team located in Indianapolis, Indiana. The team was a member of the Great Lakes Junior Hockey League. The team played their home games at the 1,200-seat Pan American Arena at the Pan Am Plaza in downtown Indianapolis. The league switched to inline hockey in 2012 and the team never joined a new league.

== History ==
The franchise was previously known as the Danville Inferno and played at the David S. Palmer Arena in Danville, Illinois. By the beginning of the 2010–11 season the Inferno had over 20 alumni playing in either Tier III Jr. A or higher levels as well as playing in college from the NCAA D-3 to ACHA D-2 levels.

== Regular season records ==
| Season | GP | W | L | OTL | PTS | GF | GA | PIM | Finish |
| 2008-09 | 42 | 19 | 19 | 3 | 42 | 120 | 157 | 694 | 6th, league Division |
| 2009-10 | 48 | 0 | 48 | 0 | 0 | 135 | 429 | 992 | last, league |

== Playoff records ==
| Season | GP | W | L | OTL | GF | GA | PIM | Finish |
| 2009 | 2 | 0 | 2 | 0 | 6 | 9 | 25 | lost in 1st round |
