= Vermilion County Bobcats =

American ice hockey team

- City: Danville, Illinois
- League: Southern Professional Hockey League
- Founded: 2021
- Folded: 2023
- Home arena: David S. Palmer Arena
- Colors: Red, black, sand, white
- Owner(s): Ellen Tully

Franchise history
- 2021–2023: Vermilion County Bobcats

The Vermilion County Bobcats were a professional ice hockey team in Danville, Illinois, that began play in the 2021–22 season as a member of the Southern Professional Hockey League. They ceased operations effective February 9, 2023.

== History ==
Danville has a history of hosting hockey teams going back to the Danville Dashers of the semi-professional Continental Hockey League of the early 1980s, the junior Danville Wings of the United States Hockey League between 1994 and 2004, and another Danville Dashers of the Federal Prospects Hockey League (FPHL) between 2011 and 2020. The FPHL Dashers elected to not participate in the 2020–21 season due to the ongoing restrictions during the COVID-19 pandemic.

On March 9, 2021, the operators of the David S. Palmer Arena held a meeting to determine whether to keep the FPHL Dashers as a tenant or give a contract to a new team. The operators decided to void their contract with the Dashers and go forward with a new team owned by Ellen Tully, a local business owner and hockey photographer, called the Vermilion County Bobcats in the Southern Professional Hockey League (SPHL). The SPHL announced the Bobcats as an expansion franchise on March 10.

The team initially hired Brent Hughes as head coach in June 2021, but by August he still could not travel out of Canada due to border crossing restrictions during the pandemic. They then hired former National Hockey League player Mike Watt as its head coach. The Bobcats had to postpone their opening weekend set of games scheduled for October 15 and 16 at home against the Peoria Rivermen after the ice conditions at Palmer Arena were deemed unsuitable. The Bobcats played their inaugural game on the road in a 3–2 loss to the Quad City Storm on October 23. Head coach Watt left the team on October 28 after a 0–4 start and was replaced by Nick Niedert on November 2 before the team's home opener on November 4.

The Bobcats replaced Niedert with David Ayres in April 2022. Ayres made his professional coaching debut at the Ford Center against the Evansville Thunderbolts in a 7–4 loss.

On February 5, 2023, the Bobcats were scheduled to host the Quad City Storm, but no Bobcats players or coaches were in the arena. The Storm were awarded a forfeit win. This was the 77th loss in the Bobcats' 86 total games to date.

The Bobcats officially ceased operations on February 9, 2023.

Vermillion County finished with a 9-70-7 record, the worst record in SPHL history, and one of the worst in the entire history of professional hockey.
