= Rostraver Ice Garden =

Arena in Belle Vernon, Pennsylvania

Coordinates: 40.199323°N 79.825641°W

The Rostraver Ice Garden (CFS Bank Event Center) is a 5,000-seat multi-purpose arena in the Pittsburgh suburb of Belle Vernon, Pennsylvania, USA at exit 43, 43a and 43b on Interstate 70.

== History ==
Opened in 1965, the Ice Garden hosts local sporting events (mainly hockey) and concerts. It also has banquet rooms and a restaurant. It was a home for Pittsburgh RiverRats indoor football team just for one season (2007) as well for the Mon Valley Thunder of the Mid-Atlantic Hockey League (2007–08). In 2014-2015, the arena was the home for the Steel City Warriors of the Federal Hockey League.

Current tenants include the Mon Valley Thunder youth hockey association, the Elizabeth Forward Warriors hockey team, Ringgold Rams hockey team, and the Serra Catholic Eagles hockey team. The California University of Pennsylvania men's and women's hockey teams play their home games in this arena. The Ice Garden is also famous among wrestling fans as the venue for Extreme Championship Wrestling in the Pittsburgh area in the mid-to-late 1990s. Scenes from Kevin Smith's "Zack and Miri Make a Porno" were filmed here. On April 29, 2017, the Rostraver Ice Garden was nominated to be 2017's Kraft Hockeyville, and later won the national competition, receiving $150,000 in upgrades, along with an opportunity to host an NHL preseason game, which was denied by the NHL and NBC for several reasons, but the Penguins were able to hold a practice & celebration at the arena. In February 2023 Black Bear Sports Group purchased The Rostraver Ice Garden - renaming it the CFSBank Event Center. The CFSBank Event Center / Rostraver Ice Garden is the second oldest ice rink in the state of Pennsylvania.

== Incidents ==
On February 14, 2010, after heavy snowfall in Southwestern Pennsylvania, a 100-by-200-foot section of the roof of the Ice Gardens collapsed during a youth hockey tournament between Canadian and US teams. About five hours after the collapse, officials reported that everyone was accounted for and there were no serious injuries. Local TV stations reported from the scene that the collapse occurred shortly after a loud cracking noise was heard, giving adults enough time to evacuate hundreds of people, mainly children, from the arena before the roof came down. The arena reopened to the public, with a new roof, on October 21, 2010.
