= Northwest Arena =

Multi-purpose arena in Jamestown, New York

Coordinates: 42.095253°N 79.2453101°W

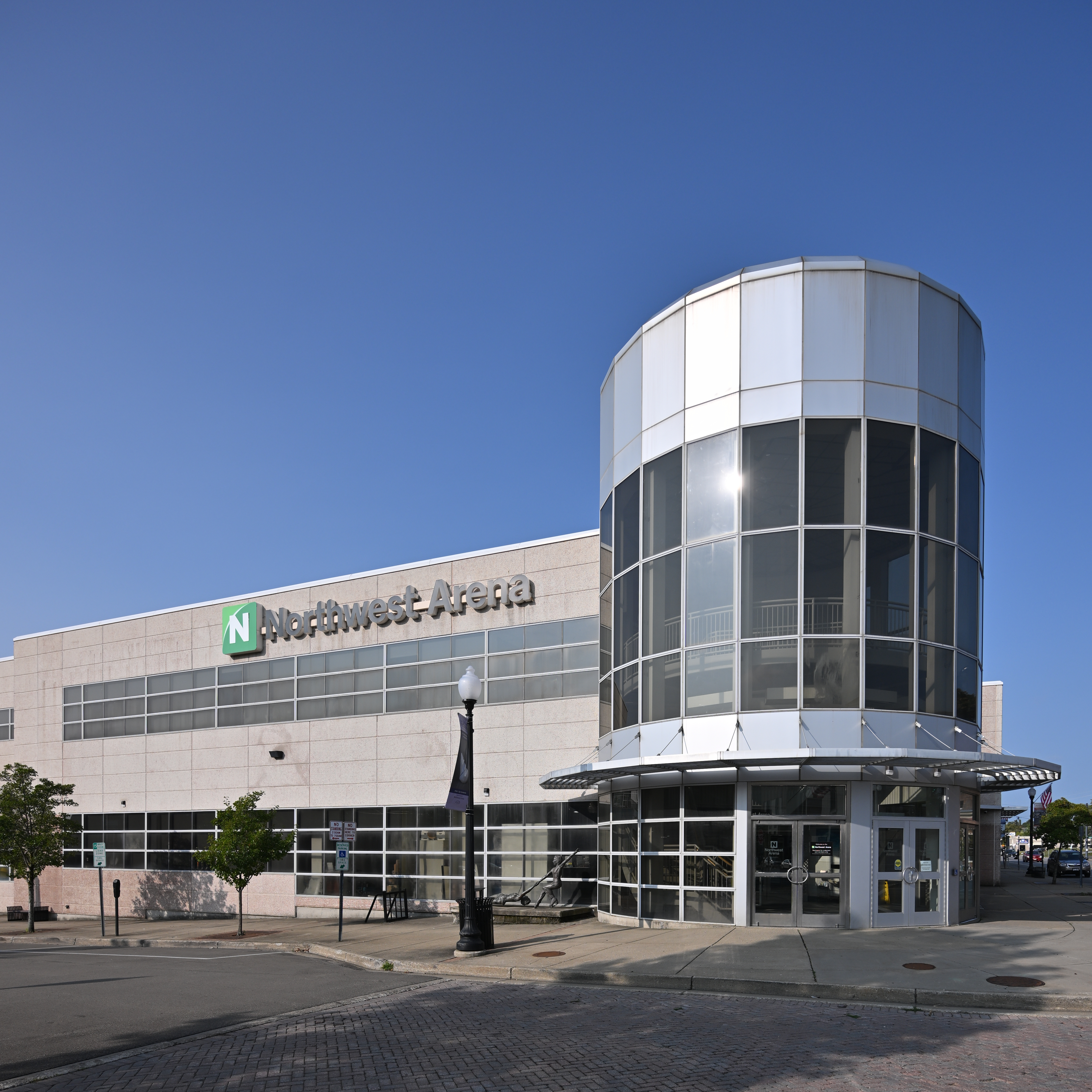
- Interactive map of Northwest Arena
- Former names: Jamestown Savings Bank Arena (2002–2016)
- Location: Jamestown, New York

Construction
- Opened: 2002

Tenants
- Jamestown Vikings (MAHL) (2007–2008); Jamestown Jets (UJHL/NJHL/GMHL) (2008–2011); Jamestown Ironmen (NAHL) (2011–2013); Southern Tier Xpress (NA3HL) (2014–2018); Jamestown Rebels (NAHL) (2018–2022)

Northwest Arena is a multi-purpose arena in Jamestown, New York, USA. It hosts local sporting events and concerts. It is currently home of the Jamestown Jayhawks, hockey team for Jamestown Community College.

It has been the home of a short-lived minor league hockey team: the Jamestown Vikings of the Mid-Atlantic Hockey League in 2007–08. It served as the home of the junior hockey Jamestown Jets from 2008 to 2011, also hosting the 2009 UJHL All Star Game, and occasionally hosts training camp for the Erie Otters. From 2011 to 2013, the arena was the home of the Jamestown Ironmen, a North American Hockey League organization; from 2014 to 2018, the Southern Tier Xpress of the NA3HL resided in the arena. It was home to the Jamestown Rebels, another NAHL team, from 2018 to 2022.

The capacity of the "Arena A" for hockey is 1,900 people; arena management explored expanding that capacity to 3,000 seats to lure a professional franchise, but this proposal was never accepted. An expansion of the facility that took place between 2018 and 2021 did not add any additional seating capacity.

The Arena has recently played host to a number of major concerts including: Kenny Rogers Christmas & Hits Tour, Clint Black, Michael W. Smith, YES & ASIA, Aaron Tippin, Aids in Africa World Village Tour, World Famous Lipizanner Stallions 40th Anniversary, Golden Gloves Boxing, Buffalo Sabres Alumni.

The arena is one of several venues that was utilized for Western New York's hosting of the 2011 World Junior Ice Hockey Championships. The arena hosted exhibition games before the tournament proper began.

Naming rights to the arena have been held by Northwest Bank since the arena's inception. Until 2016, the arena was known as Jamestown Savings Bank Arena, as the five Jamestown branches of the bank had operated as "Jamestown Savings Bank" since 1998.
