= David S. Palmer Arena =

Arena in Danville, Illinois, US

- Location within Illinois Location within the United States
- Interactive map of David S. Palmer Arena
- Location: 100 West Main Street; Danville, Illinois
- Coordinates: 40.12403°N 87.63216°W
- Owner: Danville Civic Center Authority
- Capacity: 4,750 (concerts); 2,350 (sports)
- Public transit: DMT

Construction
- Groundbreaking: August 17, 1978
- Opened: September 20, 1980

Tenants
- Danville Wings (NAHL/USHL) 1994–2004; Danville Demolition (AIFA) 2007; Danville Inferno (GLJHL) 2008–2010; Danville Dashers/Dashers Hockey (FHL/FPHL) 2011–2020, 2024–2025; Vermilion County Bobcats (SPHL) 2021–2023; Danville Iron (USPHL) 2026–present

Website
- www.palmerarena.com

The David S. Palmer Arena is a multi-purpose arena in Danville, Illinois, that has a seating capacity of 4,750 for concerts and 2,350 for sports. It was built in 1980. Along with team sports, the David S. Palmer has open ice skating and hosts concerts from time to time and U.S. Figure Skating Basic Skills Program. The arena hosted the Vermilion County Bobcats of the Southern Professional Hockey League in the 2021–22 and 2022–23 seasons.

Hockey arrived at arena with the Danville Wings junior hockey team, and the Danville Inferno. From 2011 to 2020, it was home to another Danville Dashers of the Federal Prospects Hockey League. The arena has also hosted indoor football with the Danville Demolition for one season in 2007 while the Ultimate Indoor Football League planned to have a team in the arena in 2012 but never launched.
