= Wooster Warriors =

- City: Wooster, Ohio
- League: Mid-Atlantic Hockey League
- Founded: 2007
- Home arena: Alice Noble Ice Arena
- Colors: Red, black, silver
- Owner: Mark Ward
- Head coach: Jason Cirone

Franchise history
- 2007–2008: Wooster Warriors
- 2008: Trenton Warriors

The Wooster Warriors were a minor league professional ice hockey team in the Mid-Atlantic Hockey League (MAHL). The team was one of the inaugural members of the MAHL while based in Wooster, Ohio, with home games at the Alice Noble Ice Arena for their first season in 2007–08. In April 2008, it was announced the team would relocate to Trenton, Michigan, for the second season with home games at the 1,000-seat Kennedy Recreation Center under the name Trenton Warriors. The MAHL and the Warriors folded before its second season in September 2008.
