= Philadelphia Jr. Jackals =

- City: Elkins Park, Pennsylvania
- League: IJHL Super Elite
- Division: Mid-Atlantic
- Founded: 2006
- Home arena: The Rink At Old York Road
- Colors: Navy blue, red, silver, white
- Owners: Spumoni, Inc.
- General manager: Nick DePola
- Head coach: Jimi Simmons, Dan Kuehnl
- Affiliates: Elmira Jackals (ECHL) Mississauga Charges (OJHL)

Franchise history
- 2006–2008: Delaware Thunder
- 2008–2010: Philadelphia Thunder
- 2010–2012: Philadelphia Jr. Jackals

The Philadelphia Jr. Jackals was an independent junior "A" ice hockey team that played in the Mid-Atlantic Division of International Junior Hockey League Super Elite League. The team played its home games at The Rink At Old York Road in Elkins Park, Pennsylvania.

This team was affiliated with the Elmira Jackals minor professional hockey team of ECHL and the Mississauga Chargers hockey team of the OJHL (higher affiliate).

== Team history ==
The team was formed in 2006 as the Delaware Thunder; the team was a member of the America East Hockey League (AEHL) from 2006 until 2008. After the 2007–2008 season in the AEHL, the team announced a move to the Philadelphia metro area and a name change to the Philadelphia Thunder. The team also announced they were joining the new United Junior Hockey League (UJHL).

Following the 2009–2010 UJHL season, on February 12, 2010, the Thunder announced that it had joined the International Junior Hockey League (IJHL) for the 2010–11 season. This move was to shorten travel and keep the games on the East Coast of the US. It played in the IJHL Super Elite League, in the Mid-Atlantic Division, with teams compiled from the New York, New Jersey and New England region. The move to the IJHL also came with the new name, Philadelphia Jr. Jackals, reflecting the affiliation with the Elmira Jackals.

The IJHL folded in July 2012 and soon after the Jackals disbanded.

== Regular-season records ==
Season	GP	W	L	T	OTL	Pts	GF	GA	Finish
2006–07	51	26	17	8	0	60	261	205	3rd of 9 AEHL
2007–08	50	30	13	7	0	35	229	187	2nd of 6 AEHL
2008–09	42	28	12	2	0	22	216	137	2nd of 5 UJHL Champs
2009–10	38	20	17	0	1	19	129	248	3rd of 7 UJHL

== Gallery ==
Philadelphia Thunder logo
