= Niagara Fury =

- City: Chippawa, Ontario, Canada
- League: CJHL
- Founded: 2010
- Folded: 2011
- Home arena: Chippawa Willoughby Memorial Arena
- Colors: Blue, Black, Red, Gray and White
- Head coach: (Canada) Jim Cashman

Franchise history
- 2010–2011: Niagara Fury

The Niagara Fury were an independent junior ice hockey team in the Continental Junior Hockey League. The team played out of Chippawa Willoughby Memorial Arena in Chippawa, Ontario.

== History ==
The franchise was formed in 2010 as a charter member of the Continental Junior Hockey League for the 2010–11 season. The Fury's first head coach was Jim Cashman. The Fury were one of only two teams to play in the CJHL's only season. After originally going dormant for the 2010–11 season, the Erie Blizzard merged with the Fury in order to field a team and the Fury would play home games in both Chippawa, ON and Erie, PA for the 2010–11 season. Prior the 2011–12 season, the Erie Blizzard and Niagara Fury were once again announced to field their own teams. By October 2011 the only teams still listed as playing for the 2011–12 season were the Blizzard and Fury after all other announced teams had failed to sign enough players. In November, the Blizzard announced they were withdrawing from the CJHL and became a charter member in the Midwest Junior Hockey League and the CJHL and Niagara Fury ceased operations shortly after.

== Season-by-season records ==
Season	GP	W	L	T	OTL	Pts	GF	GA	Regular season finish	Playoffs
2010–11	12	3	9	0	0	6	43	79	2nd of 2, CJHL	Lost Final
