= America East Hockey League =

Former American minor ice hockey league

- Sport: Ice hockey
- Founded: 2005; 21 years ago
- Folded: August 2008; 17 years ago
- No. of teams: 20 (peak)
- Country: Canada; United States
- Last champion: Harrington College Icebergs
- Most titles: Harrington College Icebergs – 2

America East Hockey League (AEHL) was a junior A league that folded in August 2008. The league had teams in the northeastern region of the United States.

Its stated goal was to develops its players to play on college, major junior, and professional teams. America East was also the first junior league affiliated with the North American Amateur Hockey Association.

== League history ==
The league was formed in 2005 with five member teams for the 2005–2006 season based in the Northeastern United States. The league expanded to 9 teams for the 2006-2007 season with teams based in the Northeastern and Mid-Atlantic regions of the US. The 2007–2008 season saw six teams in the AEHL after a few teams folded and the Eastern Penn Jr. Bucks announced the team would suspend operations for the season. Following the 2007–08 season the AEHL went through major changes when the Pennsylvania Enforcers, Delaware Thunder, and Wooster Oilers left the league to join the new United Junior Hockey League. After the three teams left the AEHL soon announced major expansion of the league into Canada. In May 2008 the AEHL announced four new teams from Quebec joined the AEHL for the upcoming 2008–2009 season. In August 2008 the league went dark, with most of the teams having been transferred to other independent junior hockey leagues.

== 2008–2009 teams ==
- Dover Seawolves (2007–2008)
- Eastern Penn Jr. Bucks (2006–present)
- Harrington College Icebergs (2005–present)
- Lionel-Groulx Nordiques (Sainte-Thérèse, Quebec) (2008 expansion)
- Saint Lawrence Lions (Ste-Foy, Quebec) (2008 expansion)
- Team Ulysee (La Plaine, Quebec (2008 expansion)
- Trois-Rivières (Trois-Rivières, Quebec) (2008 expansion)

== Previous teams ==
- Cleveland Training Development Program (2006–2007)
- Exeter Seawolves (2005–2007) renamed Dover Seawolves (2007-2008)
- Long Island Rebels (2006–2008)
- Springfield Jr. Pics (2005–2006)
- South Jersey Raptors (2006–2008)
- New Jersey Ice Hoppers (2005–2007)
- Norwich Icebreakers (2005–2006)
- Pennsylvania Enforcers (2007–2008) moved to UJHL
- Delaware Thunder (2006–2008) moved to UJHL
- Wooster Oilers (2006–2008) moved to UJHL
- Lowell Raiders (2005–2006)

== See also ==
- List of ice hockey leagues
