= Mid-Atlantic Hockey League =

Professional ice hockey minor league in the United States

Mid-Atlantic Hockey League
Founded	2007
Folded	2008
Head Office	Canton, Ohio
Commissioner	Jim Riggs
Current champions	Indiana Ice Miners
Official Web site	MAHLHockey.com

The Mid-Atlantic Hockey League (MAHL) was a minor professional ice hockey league in the Mid-Atlantic and Great Lakes regions of the United States. The league began play in November 2007. The league was a low-level league designed to help ex-junior and college players gain pro experience and exposure and move up to higher-level leagues.

== First season ==
The league cancelled the remainder of the 2007–2008 season and suspended operations on February 12, 2008, declaring the Indiana Ice Miners league champions. The MAHL hoped to return with teams in new locations in 2008–2009. League president Andrew Haines (the same Andrew Haines who owned the American Indoor Football League and the United Indoor Football League) assured that the league would return to action for the 2008–2009 season;Jim Riggs was the commissioner of the MAHL.

== Off-season activity ==
The league hoped to expand to between eight and twelve teams, and advertised employment positions for expansion teams in Indiana, Ohio, and Michigan. Despite stating that the Jamestown and Valley Forge franchises were the most financially solvent, the league announced that Valley Forge would not return to play in 2008, and on March 18 announced that the Jamestown Vikings would be relocated to Ohio to become the Lake Erie Vikings, citing an infamous vandalism incident that made national headlines as the reason for the move. On March 11, 2008, the league announced the first expansion team, the South Shore Shooters, based in Dyer, Indiana. Under new ownership and a new head coach, the Indiana Ice Miners planned to return. In April, the league announced the team from Wooster, Ohio would relocate to Trenton, Michigan, and play as the Trenton Warriors. The league also signed a television deal with Fanz TV, a syndication service, but this was never broadcast. Expansion franchises in Battle Creek and Chelsea, Michigan were also announced.

== MAHL folded ==
In August 2008, Andrew Haines sold the league ownership to Andrew Miller. After touring league teams, however, Miller and his legal team sought to abandon the contract with Haines. Miller took his Battle Creek, Michigan franchise to the All American Hockey Association. The South Shore Shooters also joined the AAHA, and the league folded.

== 2007–08 teams ==
Team	City	Arena	Outcome
Indiana Ice Miners	Indiana, Pennsylvania	S&T Bank Arena	League champion
Jamestown Vikings	Jamestown, New York	Jamestown Savings Bank Ice Arena	Relocated as Lake Erie Vikings
Mon Valley Thunder	Belle Vernon, Pennsylvania	Rostraver Ice Garden	Folded
Valley Forge Freedom	Oaks, Pennsylvania	Oaks Center Ice	Folded
Wooster Warriors	Wooster, Ohio	Alice Noble Ice Arena	Relocated as Trenton Warriors

== 2007–08 season ==
=== Standings ===
	GP	W	L	OTL	SOL	GF	GA	Pts
Indiana Ice Miners	32	31	1	0	0	238	88	62
Wooster Warriors	30	14	14	0	2	159	158	30
Jamestown Vikings	31	13	18	0	0	145	170	26
Mon Valley Thunder	31	11	17	0	3	153	206	25
Valley Forge Freedom	30	8	20	2	0	131	204	18

== 2008–09 teams ==
The following teams were scheduled to play the 2008–09 season before the league folded.

Team	City	Arena	Outcome
Battle Creek Revolution	Battle Creek, Michigan	The Rink Ice Arena	Transferred to the All American Hockey League
Chelsea Tornadoes	Chelsea, Michigan	Arctic Coliseum	League folded
Indiana Ice Miners	Indiana, Pennsylvania	S&T Bank Arena	League folded
Lake Erie Vikings	Auburn Township, Ohio	The Pond	League folded
Pittsburgh Iron	Mount Lebanon, Pennsylvania	Mount Lebanon Ice Center	League folded
Chi Town Shooters	Dyer, Indiana	Midwest Training & Ice Center	Transferred to the All American Hockey League
Trenton Warriors	Trenton, Michigan	Kennedy Recreation Center	Folded
