= Alice Noble Ice Arena =

Coordinates: 40.837°N 81.951°W

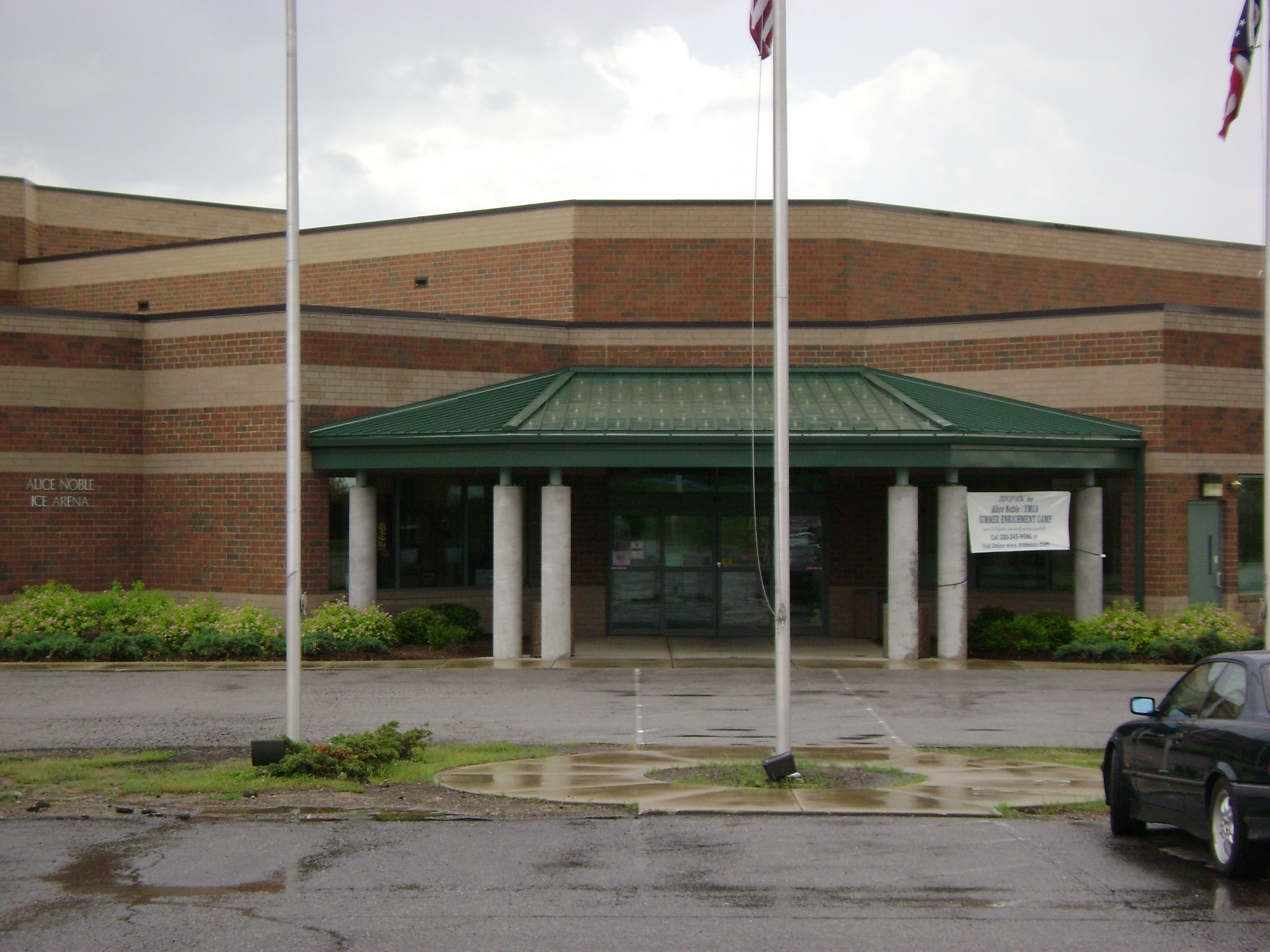
- Interactive map of Alice Noble Ice Arena
- Location: Wooster, Ohio
- Capacity: 900
- Surface: Ice

Tenants
- Wooster Oilers (USPHL) until 2022; Wooster Warriors (MAHL) 2007–2008

Alice Noble Ice Arena is a 900-seat multi-purpose arena in Wooster, Ohio. The 900-seat ice arena features an NHL size ice sheet measuring 200 feet x 85 feet. The arena also features five team locker rooms, concessions, pro shop, and meeting rooms. The arena offers club hockey, high school hockey, figure skating, and open skating opportunities.

On January 21, 2024, the arena became a 501(c)(3) non-profit organization.

Alice M. Noble, the ice arena's namesake, died on November 26, 2010, at the age of 95.
