= Continental Junior Hockey League =

North American junior ice hockey league

- Sport: Ice hockey
- Founded: 2010
- Folded: 2011
- No. of teams: 2
- Country: United States; Canada
- Last champion: Alpena Thunder
- Website: CJHL League Website

The Continental Junior Hockey League (CJHL) was an independent junior ice hockey league based in the Northeastern United States and Canada. League President Jim Cashman is the former President of the now defunct semi-pro Gulf Coast Hockey League and North Eastern Hockey League. League offices were based in Fort Erie, Ontario and Erie, Pennsylvania. The CJHL originally claimed to have 5 teams in Canada and the United States of America for the inaugural season in 2010–11 but only ever played with two teams in its only season of operation.

== History ==
=== Formation ===
The league was officially announced on May 28, 2010 on the league website. The teams were announced on June 2, 2010 in Erie, Pennsylvania and Indiana, Pennsylvania, June 4, 2010 in Syracuse, New York and June 11, 2010 in Johnstown, Pennsylvania. The Niagara Fury were announced on June 25, 2010 on the league website. On September 3, 2010 the Alpena Thunder joined the league after their league, the Northern Junior Hockey League folded. Prior to the start of the 2010–11 season it was announced that Johnstown, Indiana, and Syracuse would not play until the 2011–12 season.

The league's first ever game was on October 23, 2010, when the Alpena Thunder defeated the Niagara Fury 6-4 in Alpena, Michigan. As the only two teams in the league, they played an 18-game season for the 2010–11 season.

The 2011–12 season saw Cashman promise and announce many new teams and an affiliation with the Amateur Athletic Union. At the beginning of the season it became apparent that the league would only have two teams (Erie and Niagara after Alpena folded at the end of the 2010–11 season) and no affiliation with a governing body. Erie announced through the press that it was withdrawing from the league in November, but the team, partially owned by Niagara owner Cashman, later became a founding member of the Midwest Junior Hockey League in 2011 but folded before the season.

=== Amateur Athletic Union ===
Early in the summer of 2011, the CJHL entered into an agreement with the Amateur Athletic Union for sanctioning. As a part of this agreement the league claimed to have ascended to Tier II Junior A, which would put them on par with the likes of the North American Hockey League. When hockey blog site AmericanJuniorHockey.com inquired to the AAU about the Tier II claim, the AAU informed the blog site that they did not have "tiered" hockey structures like USA Hockey and that the claim was therefore false (although the AAU would promote the Western States Hockey League to "Tier II" in 2015, however AAU Tier II still required players to pay to play, meaning AAU Tier II was still not equivalent to USA Hockey Tier II). The AAU also has launched an audit into the CJHL's prior roster keeping practices and allegations of using unsigned and uncarded players. Since these allegation, most mentions of the AAU have been removed from the CJHL website.

== Teams ==
Team	Arena	Location
Alpena Thunder	Northern Lights Arena	Alpena, Michigan
Niagara Fury	Chippawa Community Centre	Chippawa, Ontario

== Announced teams ==
- Alpena Pride — Announced replacement for the Alpena Thunder for the 2011–12 season
- Columbus Stampede — Announced replacement of the Pittsburgh Stampede for 2011–12 season
- Erie Blizzard — Announced for 2010–11 season, merged with Niagara Fury for 2010–11 season; in 2011 became a charter member of the Midwest Junior Hockey League
- Indiana Drillers — Announced for 2010–11 season
- Johnstown Wings — Announced for 2010–11 season and again for 2011–12 season
- Lake Erie/Mentor Ducks — Announced relocation of Indiana Drillers for 2011–12 season
- Midwest Maniax — Announced for 2011–12 season
- New Jersey Raiders — Announced for 2011—12 season
- Pittsburgh Stampede — Announced relocation of the Syracuse Stampede for 2010–11 season
- Syracuse Stampede — Announced for 2010–11 season, decided to play in the International Junior Hockey League in the 2011–12 season

== Champions ==
- 2011 Alpena Thunder
