= Cleveland Jr. Lumberjacks =

- City: Strongsville, Ohio
- League: NA3HL
- Home arena: Ice Land USA
- Colors: Navy Blue, Silver
- General manager: Bob Jacobson
- Head coach: Bob Jacobson
- Affiliates: Brockville Braves (CJHL) (higher); Carleton Place Canadians (CJHL) (higher); Pembroke Lumber Kings (CJHL) (higher)

Franchise history
- 2004–2015: Cleveland Jr. Lumberjacks
- 2015–present: Wooster Oilers

The Cleveland Jr. Lumberjacks were a USA Hockey-sanctioned Tier III Junior A ice hockey team in the North American 3 Hockey League (NA3HL). The team played their home games at the Ice Land USA in Strongsville, Ohio. The players, ages 16–20, carry amateur status under Junior A guidelines and hope to earn a spot on higher levels of junior ice hockey in the United States and Canada, Canadian Major Junior, Collegiate, and eventually professional teams.

The Cleveland Jr. Lumberjacks organization also fields select youth teams at the Squirt, Pee Wee, Bantam, Midget Minor U16, and Midget Major levels.

In 2015, the Jr. Lumberjacks franchise was sold to the owners of the former Minnesota Junior Hockey League's Wooster Oilers who then relocated the franchise to Wooster, Ohio. The owners originally announced they would continue to play in the NA3HL as well as field a team in the USPHL after the majority of the former MnJHL joined the United States Premier Hockey League as part of a new Midwest Division for the 2015–16 season.

== Alumni ==
The Jr. Lumberjacks have had many alumni move on to higher levels of junior ice hockey, NCAA Division I, Division III, ACHA College, and professional levels.
