= Danville Inferno =

- City: Danville, Illinois
- League: GLJHL
- Founded: 2008
- Folded: 2010
- Home arena: David S. Palmer Arena
- Colors: Gold, Black, Red

Franchise history
- 2008–2010: Danville Inferno
- 2010–2012: Indianapolis Inferno

The Danville Inferno was a Tier III Junior B ice hockey team located in Danville, Illinois. The team was a member of the Great Lakes Junior Hockey League. The team played their home games at the David S. Palmer Arena.

== History ==
The Inferno played two seasons in Danville before relocating to Indianapolis.

== Regular season records ==
Season	GP	W	L	OTL	PTS	GF	GA	PIM	Finish
2008-09	42	19	19	3	42	120	157	694	6th, league Division
2009-10	48	0	48	0	0	135	429	992	last, league

== Playoff records ==
Season	GP	W	L	OTL	GF	GA	PIM	Finish
2009	2	0	2	0	6	9	25	lost in 1st round
