= Erie Blizzard =

- City: Erie, Pennsylvania
- League: CJHL(2010–11); MWJHL (2012)
- Division: Eastern
- Founded: 2010
- Home arena: Ice Center of Erie
- Colors: Light blue, navy blue, white
- Head coach: Curtis Prue

Franchise history
- 2010–2012: Erie Blizzard

The Erie Blizzard was a proposed independent junior ice hockey team in both the Continental Junior Hockey League (CJHL) and Midwest Junior Hockey League (MWJHL). It was announced to play out of Ice Center of Erie in Erie, Pennsylvania, but never played a game.

== History ==
The franchise was formed in 2010 as a charter member of the Continental Junior Hockey League for the 2010–11 season. The Blizzard's first head coach was announced as Curtis Prue. Prue had coached at Fairview High School where he won a league championship in 2008. He had also coached at Gannon University. However, prior to the 2010–11 season, the Blizzard had been unable to sign enough players to field a team and merged with the Niagara Fury for the season. In 2011, the Blizzard and Fury were announced to as fielding their own teams for the 2011–12 season. By October 2011, the CJHL was down to just two teams, the Blizzard and Fury. In November, the Blizzard announced they had withdrawn from the league. During the 2011-12 season, franchise Captain Matthew Shumate II led the Blizzard, as well as the CJHL in points until dismembering in 2011. Nicholas Wylucki is credited as the first ever goal scorer in franchise history, assisted by Captain Matthew Shumate II and Assistant Captain Jon Skorka.

The Blizzard briefly returned for the 2012–13 season when the team was announced as one of the founding members of the Midwest Junior Hockey League in the National Conference, Eastern Division. Only a few months into preparations for the season, the Erie Blizzard and a number of other teams went dark.

== See also ==
- Erie Otters
