= Mike Watt (ice hockey) =

Canadian ice hockey player (born 1976)

- Born: March 31, 1976 (age 50) Seaforth, Ontario, Canada
- Height: 6 ft 2 in (188 cm)
- Weight: 214 lb (97 kg; 15 st 4 lb)
- Position: Left wing
- Shot: Left
- Played for: Edmonton Oilers; New York Islanders; Nashville Predators; Carolina Hurricanes
- NHL draft: 32nd overall, 1994; Edmonton Oilers
- Playing career: 1997–2008

Michael Watt (born March 31, 1976) is a Canadian former professional ice hockey player who played for four different National Hockey League teams.

== Playing career ==
Mike Watt was drafted by the Edmonton Oilers in the 1994 NHL entry draft in the second round, 34th overall. He spent the next three seasons playing in the NCAA for Michigan State University. He joined the Oilers for the 1997–98 season.

Watt appeared in 14 games for the Oilers in 1997-98, recording 3 points. On June 18, 1998, he was traded to the New York Islanders in exchange for Eric Fichaud. Watt would play 120 games for the Isles. He was placed on waivers and claimed by the Nashville Predators on May 23, 2000. After only 18 games with the Preds, he was traded to the Philadelphia Flyers for Mikhail Chernov on May 24, 2001. After joining Philadelphia, he suffered a shoulder injury during an exhibition game. He did not play again in the NHL until he suited up for five games for the Carolina Hurricanes in 2002–03. In 2003, he moved to Europe, spending two seasons in the Russian Super League with SKA St. Petersburg and one season in Sweden's Elitserien with Leksands IF.

== Coaching career ==
In 2014, he became an assistant coach with the Amarillo Bulls of the North American Hockey League for one season. He then joined the Bloomington Thunder in the United States Hockey League as an assistant. He became the head coach of the team formerly known as the Thunder, the Central Illinois Flying Aces, in 2017, a position he held until the team folded in 2019. In 2021, he was named the head coach of the Vermilion County Bobcats expansion team in the Southern Professional Hockey League, but left after one game.

== Personal life ==
Watt was born in Seaforth, Ontario and raised in Egmondville, Ontario.

== Career statistics ==
=== Regular season and playoffs ===
			Regular season					Playoffs
Season	Team	League	GP	G	A	Pts	PIM	GP	G	A	Pts	PIM
1990–91	Seaforth Centenaires	OHA-D	39	15	23	38	43	—	—	—	—	—
1991–92	Stratford Cullitons	MWJHL	40	5	21	26	103	—	—	—	—	—
1992–93	Stratford Cullitons	MWJHL	45	20	35	55	100	—	—	—	—	—
1993–94	Stratford Cullitons	MWJHL	48	34	34	68	165	—	—	—	—	—
1994–95	Michigan State University	CCHA	39	12	6	18	64	—	—	—	—	—
1995–96	Michigan State University	CCHA	37	17	22	39	60	—	—	—	—	—
1996–97	Michigan State University	CCHA	39	24	17	41	109	—	—	—	—	—
1997–98	Edmonton Oilers	NHL	14	1	2	3	4	—	—	—	—	—
1997–98	Hamilton Bulldogs	AHL	63	24	25	49	65	9	2	2	4	8
1998–99	New York Islanders	NHL	75	8	17	25	12	—	—	—	—	—
1998–99	Lowell Lock Monsters	AHL	—	—	—	—	—	2	1	0	1	2
1999–00	New York Islanders	NHL	45	5	6	11	17	—	—	—	—	—
1999–00	Lowell Lock Monsters	AHL	16	6	11	17	6	7	1	1	2	4
2000–01	Nashville Predators	NHL	18	1	1	2	8	—	—	—	—	—
2000–01	Milwaukee Admirals	AHL	60	20	20	40	48	5	1	2	3	6
2001–02	Philadelphia Phantoms	AHL	53	11	13	24	38	5	2	1	3	6
2002–03	Lowell Lock Monsters	AHL	61	9	14	23	35	—	—	—	—	—
2002–03	Carolina Hurricanes	NHL	5	0	0	0	0	—	—	—	—	—
2003–04	SKA St. Petersburg	RSL	57	11	13	24	77	—	—	—	—	—
2004–05	SKA St. Petersburg	RSL	47	6	6	12	54	—	—	—	—	—
2005–06	Leksands IF	SHL	23	5	2	7	30	—	—	—	—	—
2006–07	Muskegon Fury	UHL	68	35	44	79	32	11	13	6	19	4
2006–07	Grand Rapids Griffins	AHL	1	0	0	0	0	—	—	—	—	—
2007–08	Muskegon Fury	UHL	49	17	32	49	27	—	—	—	—	—
AHL totals			194	50	63	113	144	23	6	4	10	20
NHL totals			157	15	26	41	41	—	—	—	—	—

=== International ===
Year	Team	Event	GP	G	A	Pts	PIM
1996	Canada	WJC	6	1	2	3	6
Junior totals			6	1	2	3	6

== Awards and honours ==
Award	Year
CCHA All-Tournament Team	1997
