= Jonathan H. Green =

American card player, inventor, writer and reformer

- Born: c. 1813; Ohio, United States
- Died: 1887 (aged 73–74)
- Other name: Jonathan A. Green
- Occupations: Professional gambler, reformer and writer
- Known for: Reformed gambler and later agent for the New York Association for the Suppression of Gambling.

Jonathan Harrington Green (c. 1813–1887) was an American gambler, inventor, writer and later reformer in New York City during the early-to mid 19th century. In his youth, he was known as one of the most skilled card players in the United States. Following his retirement from gambling in 1842, he became an active crusader against illegal gambling and was responsible for enacting anti-gambling laws in several states.

As an agent for the New York Association for the Suppression of Gambling, he conducted an exhaustive report detailing illegal gambling operations active in the city in 1850–51. He later toured the country as a lecturer and eventually published his memoirs entitled Twelve Days in the Tombs (1851), The Gambler's Life (1857) and The Reformed Gambler (1858).

== Biography ==
Jonathan Green was born in Ohio in 1813, although the Library of Congress catalog gives 1812 as the year of his birth. He became an accomplished professional gambler as a young man, popularly known from Texas to Boston as "Captain Green", and was a regular riverboat gambler on the Mississippi River. Among his most noted accomplishments was winning $23,000 in one night at the old Chestnut Street Arcade during the 1830s. After living in Texas for several years, he joined a Methodist Episcopal church and suddenly abandoned gambling in 1842. Making restitution to those who had lost money to him, he traveled the country as a lecturer exposing common gambling tricks and spoke out against illegal gambling for the next nine years. His popularity as "the Reformed Gambler" gained a significant following and helped pass anti-gambling laws in several states. He also wrote several books on the subject including "Green on Gambling", An Exposure of the Arts and Miseries of Gambling (1843), Gambling Unmasked (1844), The Secret Band of Brothers (1848), Gambling in Its Infancy and Progress (1849) and An Exposition of Games and Tricks with Cards (1850).

Green became a general executive agent of the New York Association for the Suppression of Gambling and, between 1850 and 1851, he conducted an exhaustive investigation on illegal gambling operations in New York City. On February 20, 1851, he presented his findings at the Brooklyn Tabernacle reporting the existence of an estimated 6,000 gambling houses, 200 of these being high-class establishments "catering to men of standing and sound financial substance", as well as several thousand raffling, lottery and policy houses. Green was one of several prominent speakers, most notably Horace Greeley, who addressed the large crowd. He continued writing and published his memoirs Twelve Days in the Tombs (1851), The Gambler's Life (1857) and The Reformed Gambler (1858). Green returned to Indiana at the start of the American Civil War and became a captain in the Union Army and was later employed by the US Secret Service. An amateur inventor, he took out 20 to 30 patents although his inventions proved far more profitable to others than to himself.

He moved to Philadelphia, Pennsylvania in 1876 and lived a private retired life. He eventually became destitute in his old age and, following his wife's death in 1884, a public appeal was made when he was unable to pay for his wife's funeral. Donations from "kindly minded friends" were sufficient to allow Green to bury his wife. Green himself died three years later.

== Bibliography ==
- An Exposure of the Arts and Miseries of Gambling (1843)
- Gambling Unmasked: Or The Personal Experience of the Reformed Gambler, J. H. Green (1844)
- The Secret Band of Brothers: Or, The American Outlaws. Compiled from Original Papers. by J.H. Greene, the Reformed Gambler (1848)
- Gambling in Its Infancy and Progress, Or, A Dissuasive to the Young Against Games of Chance (1849)
- An Exposition of Games and Tricks with Cards (1850)
- Constitution and Bye-laws of the New York Association for the Suppression of Gambling (1850)
- A Report on Gambling in New York (1851)
- Twelve Days in the Tombs; Or, A Sketch of the Last Eight Years of the Reformed Gamblers' Life (1851)
- The Gambler's Life: Or, The Life, Adventures, and Personal Experience of Jonathan H. Green, (the "Reformed Gambler") (1857)
- The Reformed Gambler: Or, the History of the Later Years of the Life of Jonathan H. Green the "Reformed Gambler" (1858)
- Gamblers' Tricks with Cards, Exposed and Explained (1868)
