= Harrington College Icebergs =

- City: Harrington, Quebec, Canada
- League: AEHL
- Founded: 2005
- Folded: 2012
- Home arena: Center of excellence, Laval, Quebec
- Colors: Blue, Black, and White
- Owner: Harrington College of Canada
- Head coach: Dan d'Astoli

Franchise history
- 2005–2012: Harrington College of Canada Icebergs

The Harrington College Icebergs are an independent Junior A ice hockey team for players ages 15–20. The team was affiliated with Harrington College of Canada. The Icebergs are members of the America East Hockey League. The team plays home games at the Kevin Lowe-Pierre Page Ice Arena in Harrington, Quebec.

== History ==
The Icebergs joined the AEHL for the league's first season in 2005. The team was the only Canadian team with other member teams based in the Northeastern United States. The team was founded with the school in 2005 as part of a unique and elite training program for hockey players based on the Hockey Canada development program. Harrington College is a small, private, All-Boys college designed to provide elite hockey players with a balance of strong education and strong hockey training. The school also fields a number of teams at different age levels, the Icebergs being the top men's level. The school provides education and hockey experience for players aged 13–21. Once players reach the maximum age of Junior A hockey they are prepared to enter other four-year institutions and play at higher levels of hockey such as NCAA, Major Junior A, and Pro hockey.

The Icebergs participate in the United Junior Hockey League as well as exhibition games against college and other junior and AAA hockey teams.

The school lost its permit on 30 June 2012. After that Réseau du sport étudiant du Québec (RSEQ) expelled both Harrington Icebergs teams from their league, one in collegiate and the other in high school.

== Regular-season records ==
Season	GP	W	L	T	OTL	PTS	GF	GA	PIM	Finish
2005–06	28	14	11	3	0	31	116	111	na	4 of 5
2006–07	55	35	12	8	0	78	246	166	na	1 of 9
2007–08	48	24	18	6	0	54	206	160	na	4 of 6

== Timeline ==
2001 The future founder of Harrington College of Canada becomes president and owner of the Lac St Louis Lions. Having seen too many devoted young players forced to choose between hockey and a solid education, he follows his vision and embarks on a long-term project to marry elite hockey with high level academics.

In 2002, the West Island Hockey Academy (WIHA) was established to manage the Lions. WIHA formed a partnership with Terry Davies and West Island College to implement a specialized development model for student-athletes. Under this arrangement, players practiced in the morning and attended academic classes in the afternoon. This model was based on Davies' previous educational frameworks, including the Class Afloat program."Hockey and Homework: The WIHA Model". The Montreal Gazette. 2002-09-15.

2003 Realizing that without skills in place young players will not reach their hockey potential, WIHA incorporates Hockey Canada's training model into its program. The first international players join WIHA.International players practise with the Lions, but do not play on the team. In this experimental approach, players practise for a full year without membership on the team. The results show the international players developing skill faster than the Lions’ players, while simultaneously achieving academic excellence.

2004 WIHA forms the International Practise Team, playing an exhibition and tournament schedule and training every day alongside the Lions. Both groups (International and Lions) are approximately the same age, the same skill/talent level and all practices are together (on and off ice). The International Practise Team players demonstrate clearly that they have developed in all aspects of the game faster than the Lions. This accelerated progress is attributed to the higher ratio of practice to games. As well, in games, the International players are all given equal ice time, as it is believed that this will result in the best individual development (long-term objectives) as well as a unique team experience. The Lions’ coaching staff, on the other hand, gives ice time to the players they believe can help the team win the game (short-term objectives). Although the International Practise Team is a midget-aged team, they defeat one of the top Quebec Junior AAA teams (Champlain Cougars) 3–2 at the end of the year.

2005 The Lions are sold and WIHA acquires a new flagship junior franchise in the America East Hockey League. WIHA receives independent accreditation with the Quebec Ministry of Education for their program and continues to operate out of the West Island College campus. The International team changes its name to the Icebergs and becomes the first Canadian member team in the Junior A tier II America East Hockey League. WIHA acquires a 347-acre property in the Laurentians in order to relocate the school from the West Island of Montreal to Harrington, Quebec.

2006 WIHA changes its name to Harrington College of Canada.

2008 HCC moves school to Oka.HCC becomes the first school in the history of Hockey in Quebec to become fully federated under the umbrella of the International Ice Hockey Federation (IIHF) through Hockey Canada and Hockey Quebec

2009 HCC acquires the 8th franchise in the Quebec College AAA League.HCC moves school to Oka.

== Notable alumni ==
From Harrington College's inception in 2002 when a partnership was formed with West Island College and as recent as this year, players are reaching the next level and they include:

- Alex Biega (1988) – Harvard University Crimson, NCAA, fifth round (147th pick overall) in the 2006 NHL Entry Draft by the Buffalo Sabres
- Michael Blundon (1988) – Concordia University Stingers
- Stephane Chaput (1988) – Fifth round pick of the Carolina Hurricanes in the 2006 NHL Entry Draft, Team Canada
- Jared Coreau (1991) – USHL (2009) Lincoln Stars
- Marc-Andre Cote (1987) – CHL (2003–2008) First round pick
- Wehebe Darge (1991) – World Junior Championship (2009)
- Brad Gager (1985) – Concordia University Stingers
- Mickael Gasnier (1985) – Rapaces de Gap, Div. 1 -French League, World Junior Championship (2005 & 2006)
- Mark-Andre Gragnani (1987) – Third round pick of the Buffalo Sabres (87 overall) in the 2005 NHL Entry Draft
- Brian Henderson (1986) – HC Amiens, Div. 1 -French League, World Junior Championship (2006)
- Kazuma Iwamoto (1988) – World Junior Championship (2007)
- Hiroki Iwasaki (1988) – Asia League
- Rei Kawaguchi (1987) – Asia League
- Martin Lee (1989) – World Junior Championships (2006)
- Jason Legault (1988) – CHL (2004–2008) First round pick
- Maxim Noreau (1987) – Minnesota Wild
- Chris Oles (1985) – Concordia University Stingers
- Soichiro Omi (1987) – NCAA Utica College Pioneers
- Kazumasa Sasaki (1989) – Asia League, World Junior Championship (2008)
- Yuhei Shinohara (1989) – Kansai University, World Junior Championship (2008)
- Josh Tordjman (1985) – Phoenix Coyotes
- Stephen Valente (1988) – McGill University Redman
- Leonard Verrilli (1987) – McGill University Redman
- Marc-Edouard Vlasic (1987) – San Jose Sharks

== Records ==
The team holds the most AEHL Victoria Cup Championships winning 2 out of 3 seasons in the league. They also won the 2008–2009 playoffs of the QUJHL.

2006–2007 Season

- Regular Season Champion – Harrington Icebergs
- Victoria Cup Champion – Harrington Icebergs

2007–2008 Season

- Victoria Cup Champion – Harrington Icebergs

2008–2009

- QUJHL playoffs Champion- Harrington Icebergs
