= Jamestown Jets =

- City: Jamestown, New York, United States
- League: United Junior Hockey League, Northern Junior Hockey League, Greater Metro Junior A Hockey League
- Operated: 2008–2011
- Home arena: Jamestown Savings Bank Ice Arena
- Colours: Blue, Green, and White
- Owner(s): Dennis Canfield
- Head coach: Dennis Canfield
- Media: The Post-Journal

The Jamestown Jets were an American junior ice hockey team based in Jamestown, New York. Originally members of the United Junior Hockey League and later the Northern Junior Hockey League. The Jets played in the Canadian Greater Metro Junior A Hockey League in 2010-11.

== History ==
The team was announced in March 2008. The team's name comes from the Winnipeg Jets and was chosen by a fan.

The franchise was founded by majority owner Barry Soskin and Dennis Canfield in March 2008 and the team logo and name was released on April 22, 2008 at a press conference at the JSBIA.

In August 2010, the Jets join a Canadian league Canadian Greater Metro Junior A Hockey League in Ontario. On September 17, 2010, the Jets played their first GMHL game, at home, winning 4-3 over fellow expansion club Sturgeon Falls Lumberjacks. The game was the first international regulation game in the GMHL's history.

On April 30, 2011, the Jamestown Savings Bank Ice Arena moved to evict the Jets, claiming that the team's lease was with the previous owner and was no longer valid due to the team's sale. Less than three weeks later, the GMHL announced that the Jets would be leaving the GMHL as part of the lease issues with the Arena. The establishment of the Jamestown Ironmen, which is also a Junior A franchise but one based in the U.S.-based North American Hockey League, put the Jets' future in doubt and was a direct cause of the lawsuit as the Jets held an "exclusive" lease. The team continues operations and is currently dormant as the lawsuit is active. At one time, Canfield had proposed renovation of the smaller Allen Park Ice Rink which was not cost effective. http://post-journal.com/page/content.detail/id/617920/Struggle-To-Survive.html. As of April 2013 the lawsuit Canfield filed against the Ironmen, Arena, and NAHL has progressed to New York State Supreme Court and is currently in the discovery phase sitting in the judges chambers. The Ironmen have since suspended operations.

== Regular season records ==
Season	GP	W	L	OTL	GF	GA	P	Result	Playoffs
2008-09	46	30	11	5	285	215	65	1st UJHL-South	Lost final
2009-10	51	22	26	3	248	264	47	3rd NJHL	Lost semi-final
2010-11	42	27	12	3	247	194	57	3rd GMJHL	Lost quarter-final

== Notable alumni ==
- Alexander Galaysha
