= Harrington, Quebec =

Harrington
- Township municipality
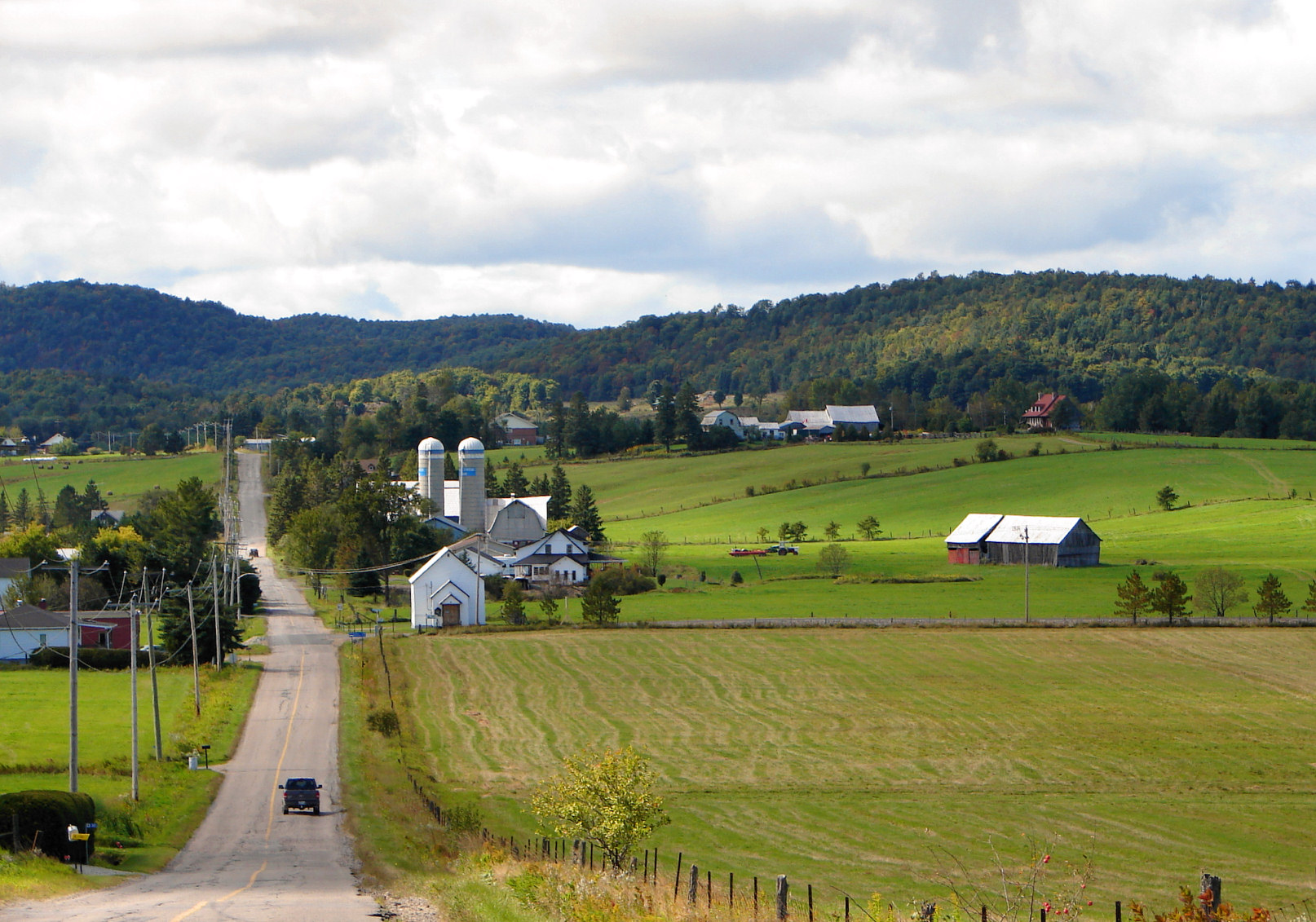

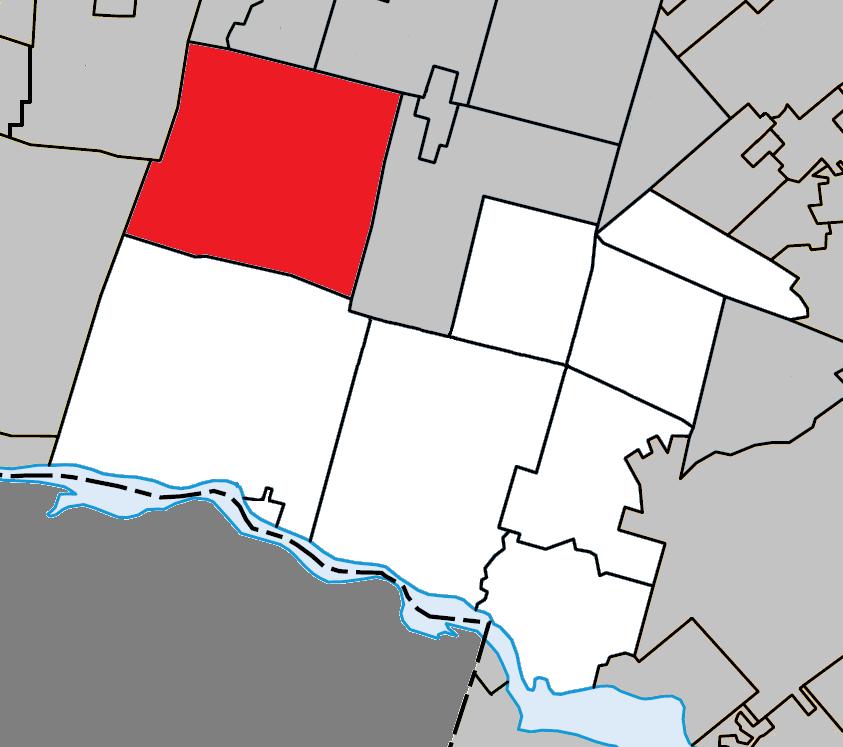
- Location within Argenteuil RCM

- Location in central Quebec
- Coordinates: 45°50′N 74°40′W
- Country: Canada
- Province: Quebec
- Region: Laurentides
- RCM: Argenteuil
- Settled: 1830
- Constituted: July 1, 1855

Government
  - Mayor: Gabrielle Parr
  - Federal riding: Argenteuil—La Petite-Nation
  - Prov. riding: Argenteuil

Area
  - Total: 249.91 km^{2} (96.49 sq mi)
  - Land: 233.65 km^{2} (90.21 sq mi)

Population (2021)
  - Total: 891
  - Density: 3.8/km^{2} (9.8/sq mi)
  - Pop 2016-2021: ▲5.3%
  - Dwellings: 1,339
- Time zone: UTC−5 (EST)
  - Summer (DST): UTC−4 (EDT)
- Postal code(s): J8G 2T1
- Area code: 819
- Highways: R-327
- Website: www.harrington.ca

Harrington is a township municipality in the Laurentides region of Quebec, Canada, part of the Argenteuil Regional County Municipality. It is located in the Laurentian Mountains, about 40 kilometres (25 mi) north-west of Lachute.

Its population centres include Harrington, Lac-Keatley (45°47′08″N 74°36′09″W), Lac-MacDonald (45°52′25″N 74°35′11″W), Lakeview (45°52′56″N 74°34′17″W), Lost River (45°49′53″N 74°32′54″W), and Rivington (45°47′26″N 74°41′01″W).

== History ==
Harrington Township first appeared on the Gale and Duberger Map of 1795, but was not settled until 1830 when Scottish pioneers settled in the Lost River area in the east. In 1841, the township is officially established and in 1855, the township municipality was formed.

It is believed that the name Harrington may be attributed to a location in England, however, the local post office was identified under the name of Rivington between 1878 and 1961.

== Geography ==
Harrington is a land of lakes and rivers, stocked with abundant fish. The Rouge River is the main river flowing through it, and the largest lakes include Lake (Lac) MacDonald, Lac des Esclaves, Green Lake, and Lake Harrington, each attracting a large number summer cottage vacationers. Its territory has a characteristic appearance of the Laurentian region with dense forests, rising to an elevation of 457 metres (1,499 ft) in the north-east, which is 30 metres (98 ft) more than Mont Chauve which dominates Green Lake.

The Lost River flows for some miles from a spring that disappears under a calcareous rock between Gate Lake and Fraser Lake.

== Demographics ==
In the 2021 Census of Population conducted by Statistics Canada, Harrington had a population of 891 living in 495 of its 1,339 total private dwellings, a change of 5.3% from its 2016 population of 846. With a land area of 233.65 km^{2} (90.21 sq mi), it had a population density of 3.8/km^{2} (9.9/sq mi) in 2021.

Canada census – Harrington community profile

	2021	2016	2011
Population	891 (+5.3% from 2016)	846 (-0.8% from 2011)	853 (+9.8% from 2006)
Land area	233.65 km^{2} (90.21 sq mi)	237.09 km^{2} (91.54 sq mi)	236.73 km^{2} (91.40 sq mi)
Population density	3.8/km^{2} (9.8/sq mi)	3.6/km^{2} (9.3/sq mi)	3.6/km^{2} (9.3/sq mi)
Median age	61.6 (M: 62.0, F: 61.2)	60.7 (M: 60.9, F: 60.5)	56.6 (M: 56.3, F: 56.9)
Private dwellings	1,339 (total) 495 (occupied)	1,379 (total)	1,361 (total)
Median household income	$55,200	$45,491	$n/a

Notes: 2021 Info based on amended population and dwelling counts.
References: 2021 2016 2011

Historical census populations – Harrington, Quebec

Year	Pop.	±%
1861	310	—
1871	760	+145.2%
1881	718	−5.5%
1891	720	+0.3%
1901	1,097	+52.4%
1911	538	−51.0%
1921	600	+11.5%
1931	613	+2.2%

Year	Pop.	±%
1941	689	+12.4%
1951	642	−6.8%
1956	681	+6.1%
1961	688	+1.0%
1966	650	−5.5%
1971	698	+7.4%
1976	679	−2.7%
1981	679	+0.0%

Year	Pop.	±%
1986	679	+0.0%
1991	729	+7.4%
1996	730	+0.1%
2001	785	+7.5%
2006	777	−1.0%
2011	843	+8.5%
2016	846	+0.4%
2021	891	+5.3%

2021 Population figure based on amended count.
Source: Statistics Canada

Canada Census Mother Tongue - Harrington, Quebec
Census	Total	French			English			French & English			Other		
Year	Responses	Count	Trend	Pop %	Count	Trend	Pop %	Count	Trend	Pop %	Count	Trend	Pop %
2021	970	380	▲8.6%	39.2%	495	▲12.5%	51.0%	35	▲600.0%	3.6%	50	▲11.1%	5.2%
2016	845	350	▲1.4%	41.4%	440	▼2.2%	52.1%	5	▼75.0%	0.6%	45	▲50.0%	5.3%
2011	855	345	▲60.5%	40.4%	450	▼2.2%	52.6%	20	▼78.9%	2.3%	30	▲200.0%	3.5%
2006	775	215	▲4.9%	27.7%	460	▼8.0%	59.4%	95	▲ n/a%	12.3%	10	▼84.6%	1.3%
2001	765	205	▲28.1%	26.8%	500	▼1.0%	65.4%	0	0.0%	0.0%	65	▲62.5%	8.5%
1996	710	160	n/a	22.5%	505	n/a	71.1%	0	n/a	0.0%	40	n/a	5.6%

== Attractions ==
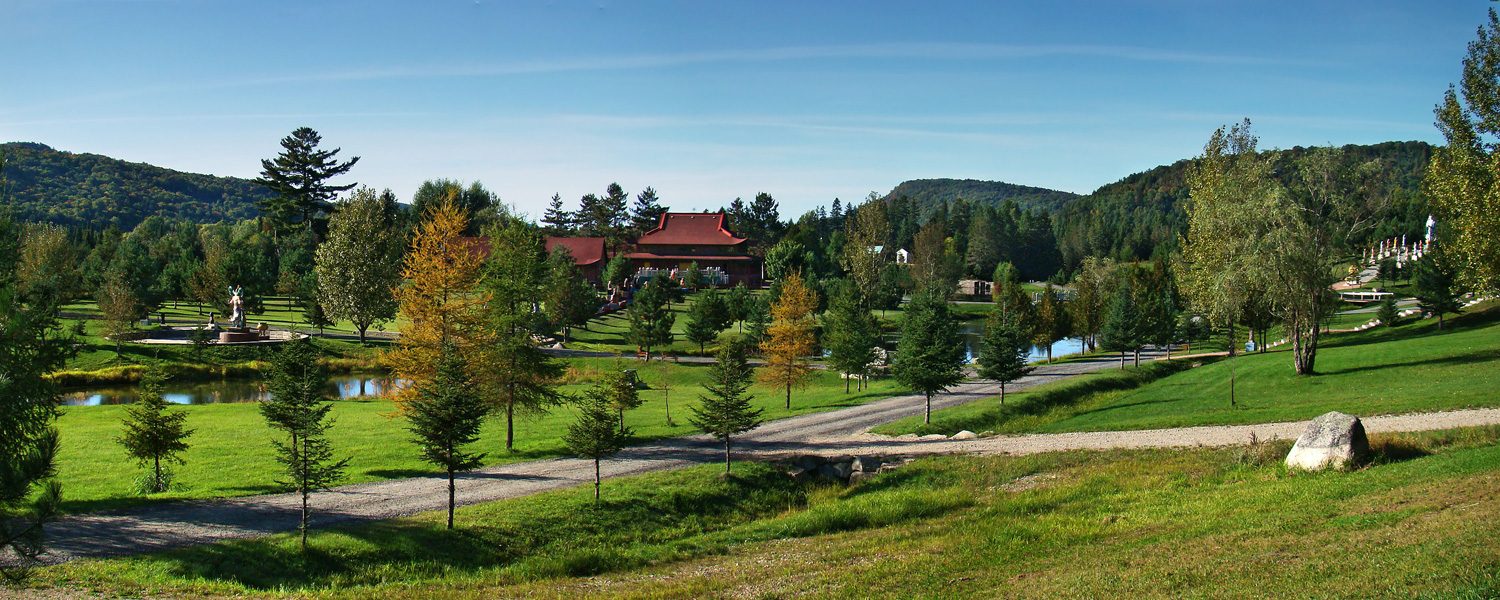
Buddhist Monastery of Tam Bao Son in the Township of Harrington.

The municipality of Harrington has 3 community centers on its territory:

- Lost River community center (LRCC), 2811 route 327
- Harrington Valley community center (HVCC), 420 chemin Harrington
- Harrington Golden Age (HGA), 259 chemin Harrington

Tourist attractions include:

- Đại Tòng Lâm Tam Bảo Sơn: First and largest Buddhist temple in Canada, founded in 1988 by Thich Thien Nghi. It houses the tallest Buddhist statue in Canada, Avalokiteshvara, who flies on a dragon to help people. It is the statue of the Buddha of compassion. The 28-metre colossus is the largest of its kind in Canada. Heavy with 360 tons of Chinese granite, it took 28 containers to transport it from Asia in separate pieces. The statue was inaugurated in 2015 in front of 10,000 devotees. The temple attracts visitors from all over the surrounding region and is the most prominent tourist attraction in Harrington.
- Eco Spa Highland
- Auberge Val Carroll (Permanently closed in March, 2025).

== Government ==
Harrington forms part of the federal electoral district of Argenteuil—La Petite-Nation and has been represented by Stéphane Lauzon of the Liberal Party since 2015. Provincially, Harrington is part of the Argenteuil electoral district and is represented by Agnès Grondin of the Coalition Avenir Québec since 2018.

Harrington federal election results
Year	Liberal		Conservative		Bloc Québécois		New Democratic		Green	
2025	57%	217	20%	75	19%	72	1%	5	3%	10
2021	52%	312	14%	82	25%	152	4%	24	0%	0
2019	53%	310	14%	80	21%	123	5%	31	5%	32
2015	54%	242	18%	83	11%	50	14%	64	3%	12
2011	31%	128	16%	64	11%	44	38%	156	4%	17
2008	37%	140	33%	124	16%	60	9%	36	5%	20
2006	40%	144	33%	119	14%	51	6%	22	6%	20
2004	62%	230	14%	51	15%	54	3%	11	6%	22

Harrington provincial election results
Year	CAQ		Liberal		QC solidaire		Parti Québécois	
2022	22%	78	33%	118	8%	27	16%	57
2018	19%	97	55%	285	6%	33	8%	44
2014	8%	45	76%	436	1%	6	14%	80
2012	14%	60	67%	285	2%	10	15%	62

List of current and former mayors:

- Ellen Lakoff (2001–2009)
- Keith Robson (2009–2012)
- Jacques Parent (2012–2021)
- Pierre Richard (2021–2022)
- Gabrielle Parr (2023-present)

List of current city councillors :

- Seat #1: Chantal Scapino
- Seat #2: Julie James
- Seat #3: Daniel St-Onge
- Seat #4: Robert Dewar
- Seat #5: Danny Low
- Seat #6: Gerry Clark

== Education ==
The Commission scolaire de la Rivière-du-Nord operates French-language public schools.

- École polyvalente Lavigne in Lachute

Sir Wilfrid Laurier School Board operates English-language schools:

- Arundel Elementary School in Arundel serves a portion
- Laurentian Elementary School in Lachute serves a portion
- Grenville Elementary School in Grenville serves a portion
- Laurentian Regional High School in Lachute

== See also ==
- List of anglophone communities in Quebec
- List of township municipalities in Quebec
