= Mon Valley Thunder =

- City: Rostraver Township, PA
- League: Mid-Atlantic Hockey League
- Founded: 2007
- Folded: 2008
- Home arena: Rostraver Ice Garden
- Colors: navy blue, gold
- Owners: Bill Faddis, Jim Logue
- Head coach: Brian Cersosimo
- Media: Monessen Valley Independent; Pittsburgh Post-Gazette

Franchise history
- 2007-2008: Mon Valley Thunder

Championships
- Regular season titles: 0

The Mon Valley Thunder was an ice hockey team which played in the inaugural season of the Mid-Atlantic Hockey League in 2007. The team played its home games in the Rostraver Ice Garden in Rostraver Township, Pennsylvania. Brian Cersosimo was the team's first and only head coach. Following the 2007-08 season the Mon Valley Thunder folded before the MAHL folded in September 2008. In their lone season as a professional hockey club, the Thunder went 11-17 with three shootout losses and a goal differential of -53.

Cersosimo, the Pittsburgh native, had experience coaching at several levels in the Pittsburgh area. Before taking over the Thunder, he coached a local high school team, a junior hockey team associated with the Pittsburgh Penguins, and another short-lived Class A minor league hockey team from Pittsburgh.

The Mon Valley Thunder got their name from the Mon Valley Thunder Youth Hockey Association of the Pittsburgh Amateur Hockey League. The latter team was founded in 1965 and plays at the same venue as the pros once did.

== 2007-2008 Roster ==
2007-2008 Skaters
Player	Pos.	GP	G	A	Pts	PIM	+/−
Joey Olson	F	22	20	29	49	14	13
Gary Klapkowski	R	16	19	26	45	28	17
K.C. Hahey	F	28	19	23	42	98	-8
James Matthews	D	30	5	23	28	28	-16
Darren Seid	D	29	7	15	22	61	-7
Brian Jacque	D	24	2	20	22	38	-5
Michael Jordan	D	24	7	14	21	36	-25
Josh Laliberte	F	19	11	8	19	10	-2
Jerry Cardinale	F	27	11	8	19	56	-13
David Sabol	F	25	10	9	19	37	-13
Jim Stussy^{†}	F	11	10	8	18	10	-3
Colin Goodwin^{‡}	D	16	3	11	14	54	-7
Zach Lindsay^{‡}	F	16	2	12	14	75	-1
William Repass	F	27	6	4	10	32	-19
John Burton	F	9	4	5	9	28	0
Gary Gagne^{†}	F	12	3	6	9	11	-11
Alex Richert	F	13	4	4	8	12	-6
Jesse Farley	G	15	3	4	7	14	-13
Nick Johnson^{‡}	F	12	2	5	7	14	-3
Daniel Schmitt	D	29	2	5	7	56	-11
Christian Panaia	D	8	1	5	6	26	-3
David Imonti	F	12	0	5	5	59	-11
Scott Gallagher	D	6	0	2	2	4	-4
Mat Demelo^{†}	F	9	0	2	2	0	-9
Jason Jaworski	F	3	1	0	1	18	-5
David Jordan	F	7	1	0	1	0	-3
Patric Caya	F	1	0	1	1	2	0
Dustin MacDonald	G	25	0	1	1	22	0
Ken Maxwell	G	2	0	0	0	0	0
Keith Trowbridge	F	2	0	0	0	5	-2
Corey Wogtech	G	2	0	0	0	0	0
Brian Maloney^{†}	D	2	0	0	0	4	1
Ryan Lowe	G	3	0	0	0	0	0
Frank Park^{‡}	G	3	0	0	0	0	0
Clint Hagmaier	D	5	0	0	0	5	-3

2007-2008 Goaltenders
Player	GP	TOI	GA	GAA	W	L	T	Svs	SV%	EN	SO
Dustin MacDonald	25	1446	141	5.85	8	14	0	769	.845	0	0
Frank Park	3	99	11	6.61	1	0	0	53	.828	0	0
Ryan Lowe	3	180	23	7.67	1	2	0	105	.820	0	0
Corey Wogtech	2	120	18	9.00	1	1	0	69	.793	0	0
Ken Maxwell	2	24	9	22.01	-	-	-	4	.308	0	0

^{†} Denotes player spent time with another team before joining the Thunder. Stats reflect time with the Thunder only.

^{‡} Denotes player was traded to another team mid-season. Stats reflect time with the Thunder only.
