= Alexander Galaisha =

Kazakhstani ice hockey player

- Born: April 6, 1991 (age 33); Astana, Kazakhstan
- Height: 6 ft 4 in (193 cm)
- Weight: 220 lb (100 kg; 15 st 10 lb)
- Position: Goaltender
- Caught: Left
- Played for: HC Yugra (KHL)
- NHL draft: Undrafted
- Playing career: 2012–2014

Alexander Galaisha (born April 6, 1991) is a Kazakhstani former professional ice hockey goaltender.

Galaisha played one game in the Kontinental Hockey League (KHL) with HC Yugra during the 2012–13 KHL season.
