= Dover Seawolves =

Former ice hockey team in Dover, New Hampshire

- City: Dover, New Hampshire
- League: AEHL
- Operated: 2007-2008
- Home arena: Dover Ice Arena
- Colors: Teal, Gray, and Black
- General manager: Ron Brousseau
- Head coach: Ron Brousseau

Franchise history
- 2005-2007: Exeter Seawolves
- 2007-2008: Dover Seawolves

The Dover Seawolves were an independent Junior A ice hockey team that played in the America East Hockey League. The team played home games at the Dover Ice Arena in Dover, New Hampshire.

== Team history ==
The Seawolves franchise joined the AEHL for the league's first season in 2005 as the Exeter Seawolves, playing from 2005 to 2007 and in Exeter, New Hampshire. The team participated in the America East Hockey League as well as exhibition games against college teams to help players gain experience. The Dover Seawolves folded after the 2007–08 season.

== Regular season records ==
Season	GP	W	L	T	OTL	PTS	GF	GA	PIM	Finish
2005-06	37	17	14	6	0	40	182	126	na	2 of 5
2006-07	55	23	29	3	0	49	235	244	na	6 of 9
2007-08	50	26	17	7	0	59	208	187	na	3 of 6
