= Harrington (Princess Anne, Maryland) =

Historic house in Maryland, United States

- U.S. National Register of Historic Places
- Location within Maryland Location within the United States
- Location: Polks Road, Princess Anne, Maryland
- Coordinates: 38°15′41″N 75°45′33″W
- Area: 4,703 acres (1,903 ha)
- Built: 1750–1760
- Built by: Holbrook, Thomas
- Architectural style: Georgian
- NRHP reference No.: 75000918
- Added to NRHP: September 11, 1975

Harrington is a historic home located at Princess Anne, Somerset County, Maryland, United States. It is a two-story, mid-18th century, frame farm house approximately 30 by 30 feet (9.1 by 9.1 m). It is one of the very few existing two-story frame 18th century farm houses of the area. The land on which the house was built was patented to a Thomas Holbrook, relative of the builder, in 1682 and remained in the Holbrook family for over 120 years.

Harrington was listed on the National Register of Historic Places in 1975.
