= Great Lakes Junior Hockey League =

- Sport: Inline Hockey
- Founded: 2008
- CEO: Gerry Lullove
- No. of teams: 4
- Country: United States
- Most recent champion: Chicago Hitmen (2010-11)
- Website: GLJHL

The Great Lakes Junior Hockey League (GLJHL) was an American inline hockey league. Sanctioned by the AAU, the league is based in the Great Lakes region of the Midwestern United States.

From 2008 until 2012, the league was a USA Hockey-sanctioned junior ice hockey league. It elected to leave USA Hockey and switch to inline in the summer of 2012.

== History ==
The GLJHL joined USA Hockey for the 2008–09 season as a Tier III Junior C league.

Before the season began, the Erie Lakers folded without playing any games.

The league sent two teams, the Illinois Frontenacs and Chicago Huskies, to the 2009 USA Hockey Tier-III Junior Nationals. The teams competed in different divisions of the Junior C competition amongst six other teams and met in the semifinals. Ultimately, the Chicago Huskies became the Tier III Junior C National Champions, defeating the Atlanta Knights from the SEJHL.

Dan Esdale, Vice President of USA Hockey and Chairman of the Junior Council, commented in the trophy presentation, “this is a new milestone, something never done before. That a new league in its first year of operation, came into the National Tournament with two representatives, both teams ending up in the semi’s against each other, one moving to the finals and winning the national title”.

The first season success greatly helped the GLJHL application for Tier III Junior B status. It was granted by USA Hockey in January 2009, just four months after the league.

In May 2010, the league announced a major realignment and expansion for the 2010–11 season. The Danville Inferno relocated to Indianapolis to become the Indianapolis Inferno. The Illinois Frontenacs moved to the FSI Shark Tank Arena in suburban St. Louis, Missouri to become the St. Louis Frontenacs. Three new teams joined the league: the Wooster Oilers based out of Wooster, Ohio and previously of the Northern Junior Hockey League. Expansion teams Fort Wayne Federals and Columbus OutCold also entered the league.

In 2011, the GLJHL was granted Tier III Junior A status.

In 2012, the league voted to break away from USA Hockey and join the Amateur Athletic Union. In response, eight GLJHL teams left to join the Minnesota Junior Hockey League as a Great Lakes Division. Under much scrutiny, it then was decided to become an inline hockey league. Since announcing it would be an inline hockey league, it changed its name to Great Lakes Inline Hockey League in 2014. They also announced games were to be held at the Motor City Chiefs home rink, the Canfield Ice Arena, and in Shelby Township, Michigan at the New Rink. However, the league has appeared to cease operations in 2015.

== Teams ==
East Division
Team	Arena	Location
Indianapolis Inferno	Pan American Arena	Indianapolis, Indiana
Michigan Ice Dogs	Plymouth Cultural Center	Plymouth, Michigan
Michigan Mountain Cats	Ice Mountain Arena	Burton, Michigan
Motor City Chiefs	Canfield Ice Arena	Dearborn Heights, Michigan

== Lakes Cup Champions ==
- 2008–09 — Illinois Frontenacs
- 2009–10 — Michigan Mountain Cats
- 2010–11 — Chicago Hitmen
- 2011–12 — Chicago Jr. Bulldogs

== Former Teams ==
- Chicago Bulldogs
- Chicago Hitmen
- Chicago Huskies
- Columbus OutCold
- Erie Lakers (2008) - folded before start of 2008–09 season.
- Fort Wayne Federals
- Kalkaska Roughnecks
- St. Louis Frontenacs
- Tri City Icehawks
- Wisconsin Rampage
- Wooster Oilers
