= S&T Bank Arena =

Sports arena in Pennsylvania, United States

Coordinates: 40.622332°N 79.126968°W

- Interactive map of S&T Bank Arena
- Location: Indiana, Pennsylvania
- Capacity: 600-1,000
- Surface: Ice

Tenants
- IUP Crimson Hawks (ACHA) (men's and women's hockey); Indiana Ice Miners (MAHL) (2007–2008)

S&T Bank Arena is a 1,000 seat multi-purpose arena in Indiana, Pennsylvania, United States. It hosts local sporting and other events.

Current tenants include the men's and women's ACHA ice hockey teams of the IUP Crimson Hawks and Indiana Area High School, Indiana Youth Hockey Association, and recreation leagues.

The arena was previously the home of the Indiana Ice Miners of the Mid-Atlantic Hockey League.

In 2020, S&T Bank arena was temporarily closed during the COVID-19 pandemic.
