= Lake Harrington =

Lake in the state of Minnesota, United States

- Location within Minnesota
- Location: McLeod County, Minnesota
- Coordinates: 44°56′15″N 94°18′13″W
- Type: lake

Lake Harrington is a lake in McLeod County, in the U.S. state of Minnesota.

Lake Harrington was named for Lewis Harrington, an early settler.
