= Michigan Grrrowl =

- City: Allen Park, Michigan
- League: Midwest Junior Hockey League
- Founded: 2008
- Operated: 2008-10, 2012-13
- Home arena: Allen Park Civic Arena
- Colors: Navy Blue, Red and Gold
- General manager: NA
- Head coach: NA

Franchise history
- 2008-2010: Findlay Grrrowl
- 2012: NWO Grrrowl
- 2013: Michigan Grrrowl

Championships
- Playoff championships: 2009 UJHL Championship

The Michigan Grrrowl was a tier III Junior "A" ice hockey team and a member of the Midwest Junior Hockey League. The franchise was previously known as the NWO Grrrowl and Findlay Grrrowl

== Franchise history ==
=== Findlay Grrrowl era ===
The franchise was founded in 2008 as the Findlay Grrrowl based in Findlay, Ohio, United States at the Huntington Bank Arena at the Hancock Rec Center. The team was owned by Barry Soskin and Pat Pylypuik; while Dave Erickson served as head coach. The team was an inaugural member of the United Junior Hockey League (UJHL). The Grrrowl won the first and only UJHL Championship in the final game of the best-of-three final series with an OT win over the Jamestown Jets. Following the 2008-2009 UJHL season The Grrrowl and many former UJHL teams left the United Junior Hockey League and joined the new Northern Junior Hockey League. After one season as the NJHL, the league disbanded after key members left the NJHL in late August 2010.

=== MWJHL era ===
The Grrrowl franchise was resurrected in 2012 by Pat Pylypuik as an inaugural member the AAU-sanctioned Midwest Junior Hockey League. The team changed name to the Northwest Ohio (NWO) Grrrowl to reflect the team's move to Toledo, Ohio and the Team Toledo Ice House.

The team went through several large changes midway through the 2012–13 season. MR. Acquisitions and Management Group of Belleville, Michigan took the operation of the Grrrowl while Micheal Rumps became the head coach. The team also relocated to Allen Park, Michigan and the Allen Park Civic Arena midway through the season. The team changed its name to the Michigan Grrrowl.

The franchise again went dormant after the 2012-13 MWJHL season while owners attempted to join a USA Hockey-sanctioned league.

== Findlay hockey history ==
The market was previously served by the Findlay Freedom a semi-pro team that played in Findlay, Ohio from 2006 to 2008. The University of Findlay fielded an ice hockey team in the CHA until 2004 and the city was the home of the Findlay Warriors of the Continental Hockey League in 1983–1984.

== Regular season records ==
Season	GP	W	L	OTL	PTS	GF	GA	Finish	League
2008-09	44	19	19	6	44	194	191	2nd	UJHL
2009-10	46	9	36	1	19	154	282	7th	NJHL
2012-13	48	18	28	2	38	178	236	8th	MWJHL
