= Pittsburgh Cougars =

- City: Canonsburg, Pennsylvania
- League: NJHL
- Founded: 2007
- Home arena: Southpointe Iceoplex
- Colors: Black, purple, and white
- Owner: Barry Soskin
- Head coach: Paul Contreras

Franchise history
- 2001–2004: Traverse City Enforcers
- 2007–2009: Penn Enforcers
- 2009–present: Pittsburgh Cougars

The Pittsburgh Cougars are a currently dormant junior ice hockey team. The Cougars played their home games at the Iceoplex at Southpointe near Canonsburg, Pennsylvania.

== Franchise History ==
The team was originally known as the Traverse City Enforcers and played in Traverse City, Michigan as a member of the now-defunct Continental Elite Hockey League from 2001 until the league folded in 2004. The TC Enforcers' home arena was Centre Ice. In the 2002–2003 season, Scott Gardiner, head coach of the Enforcers, won CEHL coach of the year, and goaltender Aaron Walski was named league rookie of the year.

The team was resurrected in 2007 as a member of the America East Hockey League. The team finished their first season with a record of 9 wins, 35 losses, and 6 ties. After the 2007–2008 season in the AEHL, the management announced a move to the new United Junior Hockey League. The team joined the UJHL in the fall of 2008.

The franchise became the Pittsburgh Cougars in 2009 and is currently dormant.
