= Midwest Junior Hockey League =

- Sport: Ice hockey
- Founded: 2012
- Folded: 2015
- Country: United States
- Website: Official website

The Midwest Junior Hockey League (MWJHL) was an American junior ice hockey league. The MWJHL were members of the United Hockey Union and sanctioned by the Amateur Athletic Union (AAU). On March 10, 2015, the league announced it would be joining the United States Premier Hockey League as part of a new Midwest Division beginning in the 2015–16 season.

== History ==
=== Founding ===
The MWJHL began in 2012 with a league office in Sylvania, Ohio consisting of six full-time employees to support members vision and objectives. The first league meetings were in July 2012 in Deerfield, Illinois, to establish the first member teams, conference alignment of the teams, and playoff format. On July 18, 2012 The MWJHL announced that Kevin Shanahan was named as the director of hockey operations. As the league continued to form, the MWJHL named Patrick Pylypuik president and chief executive officer for the 2012–13 season. He had previously been serving on an interim basis. Randy Montrose of the Hartland Hounds was elected chairman of the board for the MWJHL. Keith Lang of Tennyson Chevrolet named executive vice-president. Doug Goudreau from the Soo Firehawks was named secretary/treasurer.

The league initially planned for a total of 11 teams for the inaugural season, including: Bloomington Jr. Blaze, Dayton Aeros, Great Lakes Lightning, Hartland Hounds, Holland River Bandits, Ironwood Bears, Lake Erie Steelheads, Michigan Ice Dogs, Northwest Ohio Grrrowl, Rhinelander Street Cats, Soo Firehawks, and the Tennyson Chevrolet. The teams were divided into two conferences and four divisions. The American Conference comprised the North (Rhinelander and Soo) and Central (Great Lakes, Hartland, Michigan, Tennyson) Divisions. The National Conference included the East (Dayton, Lake Erie, NWO) and West (Bloomington and Holland) Divisions. The top two teams in each division would qualify for the post-season. The first round would be a best-of-three format played at the higher seed's rink. The second round would also be a best-of-three series with Games 1 and 2 played at the higher seed's rink and if necessary, Game 3 would be played at the lower seed's rink. The championship final would be a best-of-five with the first three games at the higher seed's rink and the last two, if needed, at the lower seed's rink.

On August 30, 2012 The Junior Hockey News reported Kankakee, Ironwood, Traverse City, Cincinnati, Erie (PA) folded before the league's inaugural season. In early September, the league pushed back the start of the season to allow teams more time to sign players and establish their rosters.

=== 2012–13 season ===
The MWJHL began the 2012–13 season in mid-September with 10 teams. Dayton, playing in Monroe, Michigan, folded after playing 12 games. The league continued to season with nine teams and the games against Dayton recorded as forfeits. The Hartland Hounds claimed the regular season title with a 47-0-1 record.

The Hounds continued their success in the playoffs with a two-game sweep of the Bloomington Jr. Blaze in the semifinal round. Tennyson Chevrolet defeated Soo in two games to face the Hounds for the inaugural Veterans Memorial Cup. The Hounds then swept Tennyson in the championship series.

Both Hartland and Tennyson traveled to six-team Las Vegas, Nevada, for the UHU National Championship against teams from the Western States Hockey League and Northern States Hockey League. Both MWJWHL teams went 1–3–0 in the tournament with Hartland finishing sixth in the standings and Tennyson finishing fifth.

=== 2013–14 season ===
The league went through a number of changes during the summer of 2013. The Michigan Grrrowl left the MWJHL to apply to another league, and later ceased operations when the team was unable to secure a new league. The dormant Traverse City Cohos' franchise was sold and moved to Marquette, Michigan, but within a few months, the newly named Marquette Royales left the MWJHL for the MnJHL. In June 2013, the AAU suspended the Holland River Bandits franchise due to the team's on-going financial struggles. Several of the core franchises changed names, including the Great Lakes Lightning becoming the Berkley Bruins, the Rhinelander Street Cats relocating to Alpena, Michigan, Tennyson Chevrolet renamed to the Detroit Fighting Irish, and the Hartland Hounds moving to Traverse City, Michigan, The West Michigan Freeze were initially announced as an expansion franchise but decided to hold out until the 2014–15 season, dropping the league to seven teams for the 2013–14 season.

The MWJHL began its second season with seven teams. Traverse City Hounds earned their second regular season title. The Hounds swept the series against the Alpena Street Cats in the playoff semifinal while the Soo Firehawks defeated the Detroit Fighting Irish two-games-to-one. The Hounds claimed their second straight Veterans Memorial Cup title with a win over Soo in game three of the championship series.

Soo went 2–2 at the 2014 UHU National Championship against teams from the Western States Hockey League and Northern States Hockey League while Traverse City finished with a 1–3 record. The teams finished fourth and fifth in the six-team event.

=== 2014–15 season ===
The 2014 summer break brought more changes to the MWJHL. The league transferred the franchise rights in Alpena from the Street Cats to the Flyers and the Bloomington Blaze relocated to Decatur. The league also announced the expansion of the MC Monarchs (MC for Motor City) playing out of Mount Clemens. July saw the team decide on Fraser as their base of operations.

Mid-August noted that the West Michigan Freeze (initially delayed from a 2013 expansion to start 2014) has been dropped from the MWJHL webpage as one of the current year franchises. League website promptly acknowledged the folding of the Freeze. After playing 17 league games, the Berkley Bruins ceased operations on November 17, 2014.

On March 10, 2015, the MWJHL announced it would be joining the United States Premier Hockey League as part of a new Midwest Division pending USA Hockey approval. After the 2014–15 season concluded, the MWJHL ceased to be a league and were no longer a members of the AAU. Prior to their first season in the USPHL Midwest, the MC Monarchs became the Motor City Hawks, the Michigan Ice Dogs became the Michigan Wild, and the Soo Firehawks ceased operations.

== Final teams ==
Team	Arena	City/area	Joined MWJHL
Alpena Flyers	Northern Lights Arena	Alpena, Michigan	2014–15
Decatur Blaze	Decatur Civic Center	Decatur, Illinois	2012–13 (as Bloomington Blaze)
Detroit Fighting Irish	Ice Box Sports Center	Brownstown, Michigan	2012–13 (as Tennyson Chevrolet)
MC Monarchs	Fraser Hockeyland	Fraser, Michigan	2014–15
Michigan Ice Dogs	Farmington Hills Ice Arena	Farmington Hills, Michigan	2012–13
Soo Firehawks	Big Bear Arena	Sault Ste. Marie, Michigan	2012–13
Traverse City Hounds	Centre Ice Arena	Traverse City, Michigan	2012–13 (as Hartland Hounds)

== Former teams ==
=== Teams that joined the USPHL ===
- Alpena Flyers (2014–15; joined the Midwest Division in 2015 and the USP3 Division in 2016; ceased operations in 2017)
- Decatur Blaze (2014–15; joined the Midwest Division in 2015, the USP3 Division in 2016, and the Premier Division in 2017)
- Detroit Fighting Irish (2013–15; joined the Midwest Division in 2015, the Elite Division in 2016, and the Premier Division in 2017)
- MC Monarchs (2014–15; became the Motor City Hawks upon joining the USPHL; joined the Midwest Division in 2015, the USP3 Division in 2016, and the Premier Division in 2017; became Motor City Hockey Club in 2018)
- Michigan Ice Dogs (2012–15; became the Michigan Wild upon joining the USPHL; joined the Midwest Division in 2015 and the USP3 Division in 2016 but ceased operations before the start of the 2016–17 season)
- Soo Firehawks (2012–15; joined the Midwest Division in 2015 but folded prior to the start of the season)
- Traverse City Hounds (2013–15; joined the Midwest Division in 2015, the USP3 Division in 2016 and were renamed to the Traverse City North Stars, ceased operations in 2017)

=== Folded, relocated, and departed teams during the MWJHL ===
- Alpena Street Cats (2013–14; originally Rhinelander Street Cats; team replaced in Alpena by the Flyers)
- Berkley Bruins (2013–14; previously Great Lakes Lightning; ceased operations midseason in November 2014)
- Bloomington Blaze (2012–14; moved to Decatur)
- Cincinnati Stache (September 2012; folded, never played)
- Dayton Aeros (2012; ceased operations midseason in November 2012)
- Erie Blizzard (September 2012; folded, never played in the MWJHL)
- Great Lakes Lightning (2012–13; became Berkley Bruins)
- Hartland Hounds (2012–13; relocated to become the Traverse City Hounds)
- Holland River Bandits (2012–13; franchise suspended by the AAUin June 2013)
- Ironwood Bears (September 2012; folded, never played)
- Kankakee Kingfish (August 2012; folded, never played)
- Lake Erie Steelheads (September 2012; folded, never played)
- Marquette Royales (June 2013; formerly the Traverse City Cohos, the team joined the MnJHL before playing a game in the MWJHL)
- Michigan Grrrowl (2013; left the league for USA Hockey sanctioning but would cease operations instead)
- NWO Grrrowl (2012–January 1, 2013; Moved to Allen Park, Michigan, midway through the first season and renamed Michigan Grrrowl)
- Rhinelander Street Cats (2012–13; relocated to become Alpena Street Cats)
- Tennyson Chevrolet (2012–13; became the Detroit Fighting Irish)
- Traverse City Cohos (September 2012; never played; dormant franchise sold and moved to Marquette, Michigan, in 2013 as the Marquette Royales)
- West Michigan Freeze (2013–14; never played but were given dormancy status through the 2013–14 season)

== Champions ==
The MWJHL member teams competed in the Veterans Memorial Cup playoffs. The winners of the Veterans Memorial Cup and regular season champion then moved on to play for the UHU national championship held in April.

Season	Playoff Champion	Runner-up	Result	Regular season winner
2012–13	Hartland Hounds	Tennyson Chevrolet	2–0 (best-of-3)	Hartland Hounds
2013–14	Traverse City Hounds	Soo Firehawks	2–1 (best-of-3)	Traverse City Hounds
2014–15	Traverse City Hounds	MC Monarchs	2–0 (best-of-3)	Traverse City Hounds
