= Northern Junior Hockey League =

- Sport: Ice hockey
- Founded: 2008; 18 years ago
- Folded: 2010; 16 years ago
- Country: United States; Canada
- Last champion: Wooster Oilers
- Website: NJHL League Website

The Northern Junior Hockey League (NJHL) was an independent regional junior ice hockey league based in Jamestown, New York. The league operated from 2008 to 2010.

== History ==
=== United Junior Hockey League ===
The United Junior Hockey League (UJHL) was created in 2008 when three teams — the Penn Enforcers, Philadelphia Thunder, and Wooster Oilers transferred from the America East Hockey League to form the UJHL along with the additional expansion teams — Findlay Grrrowl and Jamestown Jets. In August 2008, after the America East Hockey League went dark for the 2008–2009 season, the UJHL accepted four Canadian teams that were to be new members of the AEHL into the UJHL. A new Division was created for the teams, made up of prep schools and small colleges that field Junior teams from Quebec, Canada.

UJHL logo

In February 2009, the entire North Division left the UJHL. The reason given by the league was lack of finances. Soon after, the four North Division teams played their own playoffs, won by the Harrington College Icebergs over Team Ulysse 2-games-to-1. In March 2009, Barry Soskin, owner of the Penn, Jamestown, and Findlay franchises decided to pull his teams from the UJHL, before briefly agreeing to return in order to finish the playoffs. The remaining first UJHL playoff champion, without competition from their North Division, was the Findlay Grrrowl who beat the Jamestown Jets 2-games-to-1 to win in the final.

Soskin's franchises eventually did split off to form the Northern Junior Hockey League in 2009. The NJHL also claims membership of the Adirondack, Philadelphia, Troy, and Wooster teams, in addition to the Jamestown and Findlay teams, and Team Ulysse, which joined as well.

The league merged completeness with the NJHL.

=== Northern Junior Hockey League ===
The new league, under the Northern Junior Hockey League (NJHL), name was officially announced on May 11, 2009 when the NJHL launched its website. The league's first season of play is the 2009-10 season. The first game was won by the Jamestown Jets playing against the Findlay Grrrowl by 5:2, playing at the Jamestown Savings Bank Arena on September 11, 2009. But the Findlay Grrrowl split the series by, winning the second game on September 12, 2009.

On August 25, 2010 the Jamestown Jets announced the team was moving to the Canadian Greater Metro Junior A Hockey League (GMHL). followed by the Battle Creek Jr. Revolution, an expansion franchise for 2010-11 announced a move to the Tier III junior A Central States Hockey League (CSHL) and the Troy Bruins announced that the franchise was moving to the minor professional All American Hockey League (AAHL). On August 31, 2010 Danville Express's GM resigned and Findlay Grrrowl and Danville websites have been taken down and no word from the Alpena Thunder, sparking rumors the league folded. On September 1, 2010 the league went dark.

=== Former teams ===
- Adirondack Predators- 2009–2010, league champions '
- Alpena Thunder expansion 2010, joined CJHL
- Battle Creek Jr. Revolution- expansion 2010, joined CSHL
- Danville Express 2010, never played, folded
- Draveurs de Trois-Rivières 2008–2009, moved to LHPS
- Findlay Grrrowl 2008–2010, folded
- Indiana Inferno- 2009, never played, folded
- Jamestown Jets- 2008–2010, moved to GMHL
- Penn Enforcers 2008–2009, folded
- Pittsburgh Cougars- never played, folded
- Philadelphia Thunder- 2008–2010, moved to IJHL
- Saint Lawrence Lions 2008–2009, moved to LHPS
- Team Ulysse-2008–2010, moved to LHPS
- Troy Bruins 2009-2010, moved to AAHL
- Wooster Oilers- 2008–2010, moved to GLJHL

== Championships ==
=== UJHL Champions ===
South

- 2009 Findlay Grrrowl

North

- 2009 Harrington College Icebergs
