= Genmar Holdings =

American recreational motor boat manufacturer

Genmar Holdings, Inc. was the second largest manufacturer of recreational motor boats, founded in 1978. It was headquartered in Minneapolis, Minnesota with offices in Little Falls, Minnesota and Cadillac, Michigan.

In 2009, the company filed for Chapter 11 Bankruptcy.

== Holdings ==
It owned the Aquasport, Carver Yachts, Champion Boats, Crestliner, Glastron, Hatteras Yachts, Larson Boats, Lowe Boats, Scarab Boats, Trojan Yachts, and, Wellcraft brands.

=== Major transactions ===
- In 2001, Genmar sold Hatteras Yachts to Brunswick Corporation in an $80M cash transaction.
- In 2010, PBH Marine Group bought 11 brands, including Ranger Boats, Stratos Boats, Champion, Wellcraft, Four Winns, Larson and Glastron out of bankruptcy for $70 million.
- Platinum Equity bought the Ranger and Stratos lines of business in February 2010.
- The Carver Yachts and Marquis Yachts assets were purchased for $6.05 million by J&D Acquisitions LLC, a company created by former Genmar owner Irwin Jacobs, along with investor John Paul DeJoria.
- Aquasport was purchased by Twin Vee PowerCats, and are again available.
