= Trojan Yachts =

American motorboat manufacturing company

Trojan Yachts is (1949–1992) a US manufacturer of motorboats, with offices and production facilities in Lancaster Pennsylvania, Elkton Maryland and Niagara-on-the-Lake Ontario Canada.

== History ==
In 1949 James R. "Jim" McQueen and Harper Hull purchased the Cottrell-Spoore Boatworks of Troy, New York. The company was named "The Trojan Boat Company" and moved the business to York, Pennsylvania. Soon they moved to Lancaster, Pennsylvania.

Growth in sales after the Korean War necessitated additional facilities at Elkton, Maryland, and Niagara-on-the-Lake, Ontario, Canada. Trojan by 1968 had become one of the largest producers of inboard motor boats in the world, employing over 700 people, most on their 26-acre site in a 142,000 square foot factory and adjacent truck depot at 167 Greenfield Road, Lancaster, Pennsylvania. In 1966 Trojan acquired the Shepherd Boat Company, Canada, manufacturer of up to 50-foot wooden motor yachts.

The Elkton Plant, located on 26 acres of land at the top of the Elk River, opened in the spring of 1965. In the 30,000 square-foot industrial structure, the 42-foot leisure boat, as well as smaller craft, were built. The company launched its first pleasure craft into the Elk River on July 30, 1965.

Originally all of the boats were built of wood. Transition to fiberglass hulls forced the company to become affiliated with Whittaker Marine Group, listed on the NYSE, which ultimately included Bertram Yacht, Trojan Yachts, Riva, Desco Marine, Kettenburg, Balboa Marine, and Coronado Yachts. Total sales of the Whittaker Marine Group reached between $250 and $350 Million in the early 70s.

The Trojan Yacht Company of Lancaster, Pennsylvania ended production in 1992. The Elkton, which was also hampered by silting in the river, closed at the end of 1989. Carver Yachts under Genmar Holdings, purchased the Trojan Boat brand name and assets.

== Notable Trojan models ==
- Argonaut, a 1961 33 foot Trojan Express Cabin Cruiser yacht used by Lloyd Bridges as Mike Nelson in television series Sea Hunt. The name was derived from the epic Greek tale of Jason and the Argonauts by Sea Hunt creator Ivan Tors and producer Frederick Ziv.
- Trojan Sea Breeze 28 foot (1954+)
- Trojan Express 33 foot model (1960s). The Trojan Express cabin cruiser in the 1960s television show Sea Hunt was custom built in 1960 with mahogany planking and teak decks and trim, and measured 33 feet long and 12 feet wide. It was named, after the mythological Greek heroes who sailed with Jason in quest of the Golden Fleece, the Argonaut.
- Trojan Sea Voyager (originally 31 feet and later a 42 footer with the same name)
- Trojan 32 foot model (1972–1992)
- Trojan 10 Meter (1980) - designed by Ron Pickle, President Don Seith, and designer Harry Schoell).

== Display at The National Christmas Center ==
The National Christmas Center "National Christmas Center Website". has display on Trojan Boats/Yachts. Pictures follow.

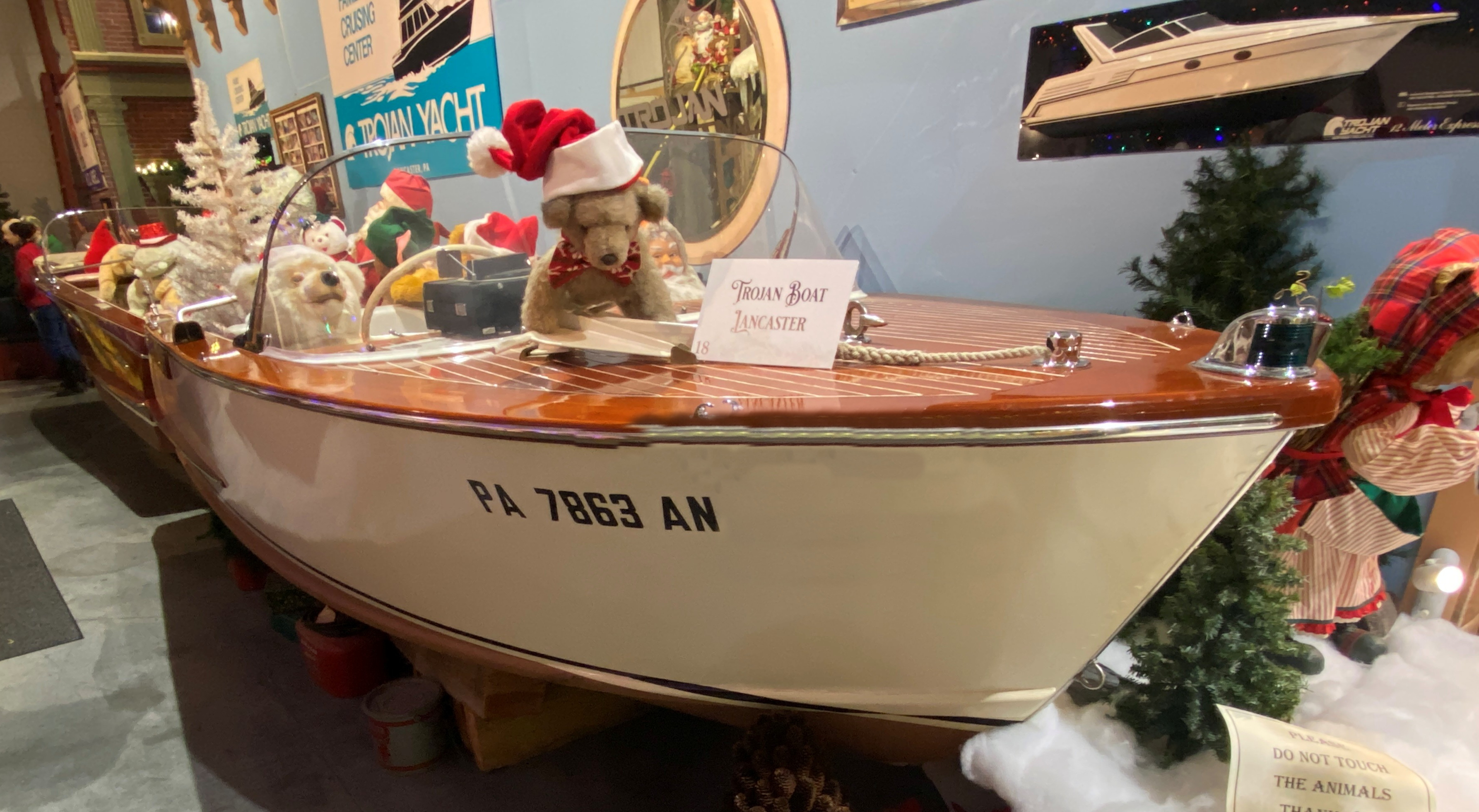
Trojan Yacht 2 of 2 at National Christmas Center

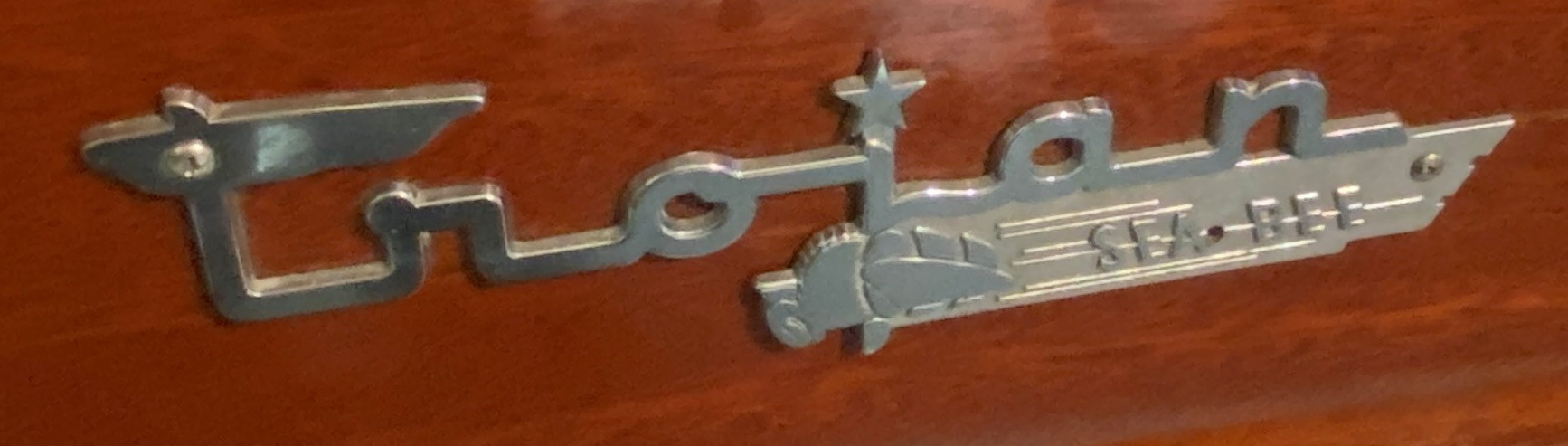
Trojan Yacht nameplate

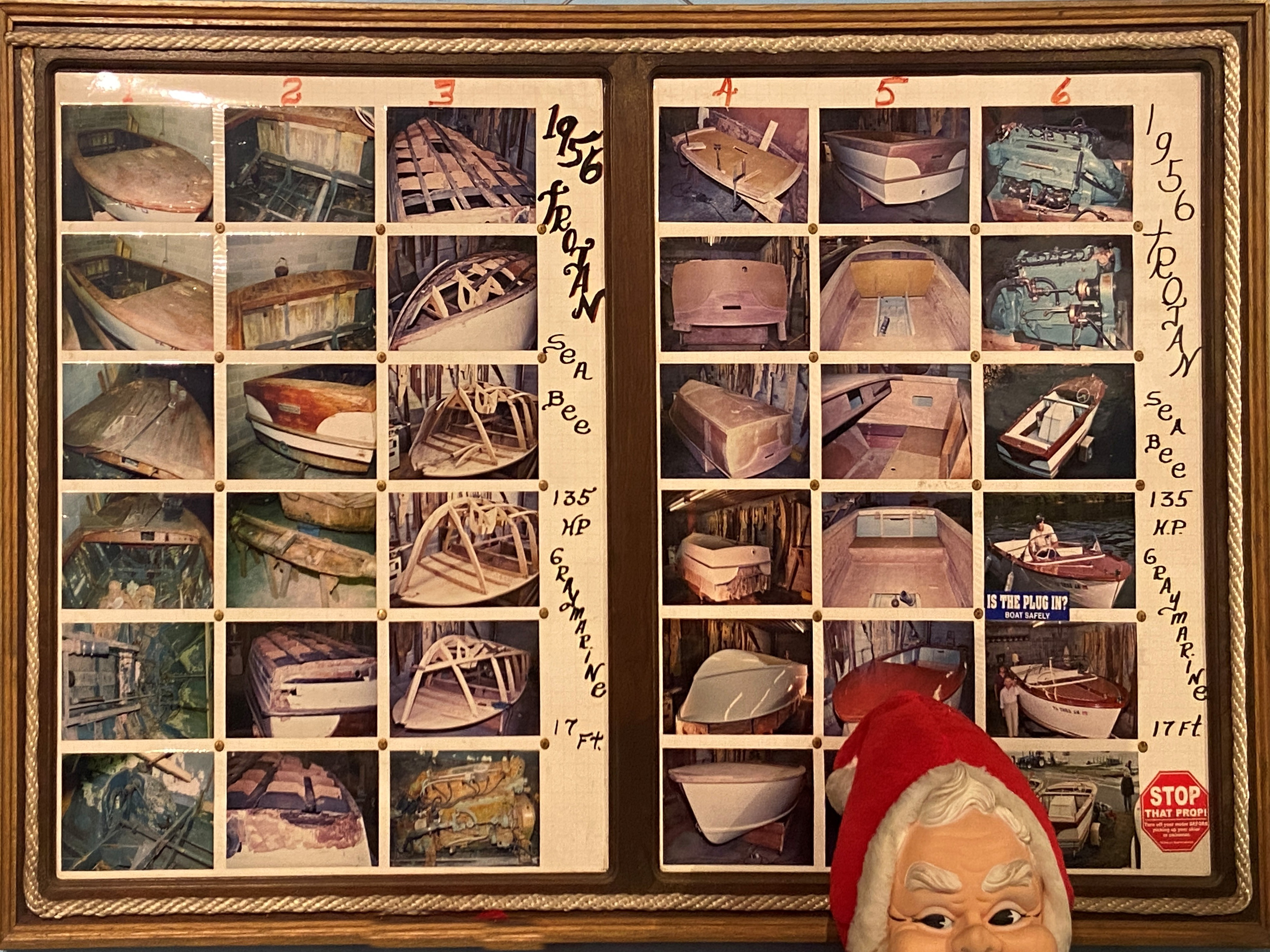
As Built photo sequence for Trojan Yacht 1956 17-ft Sea Bee 135 hp

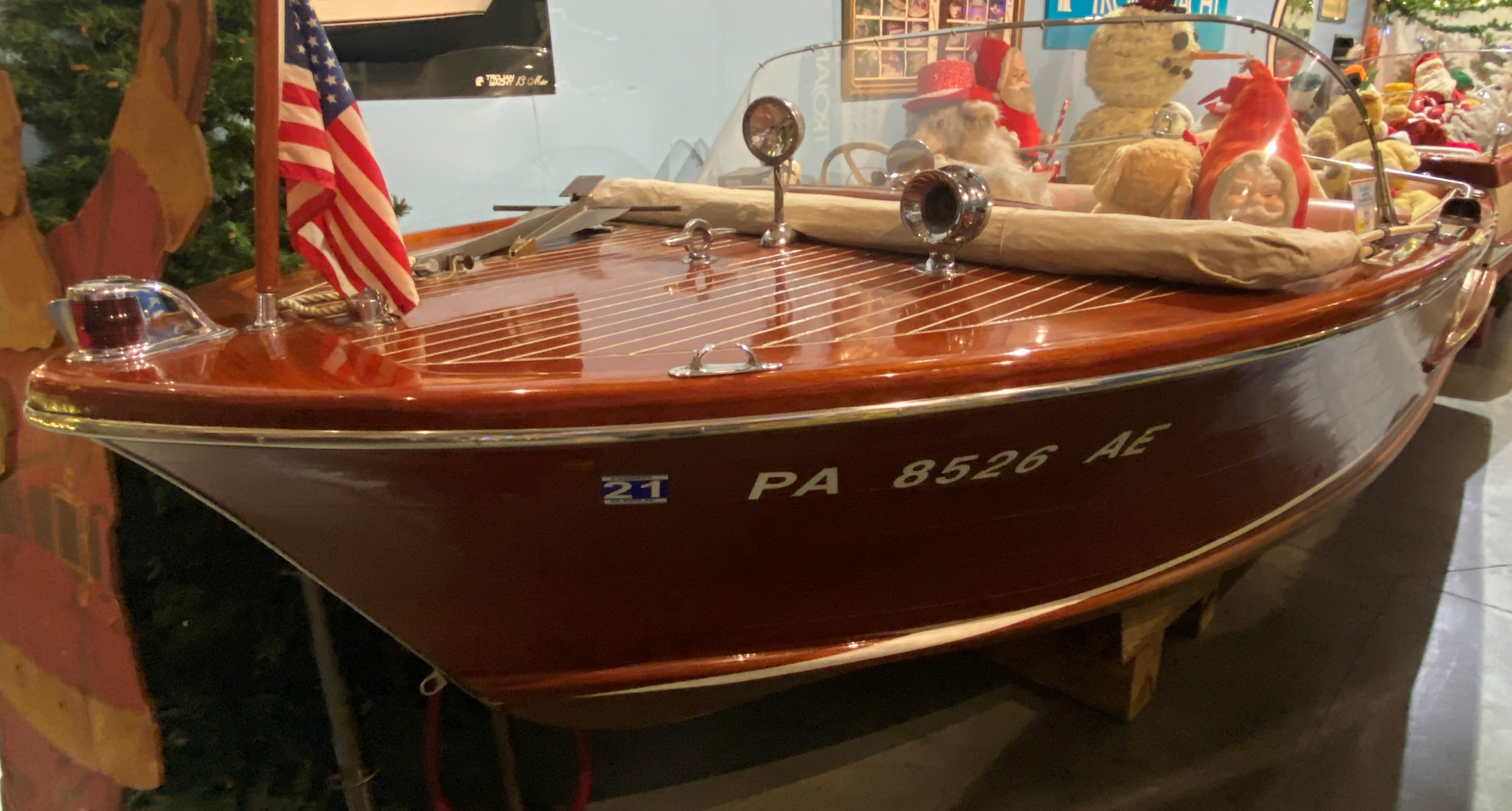
Trojan Yacht Sea Bee at National Christmas Center 1 of 2

== See also ==
- Cabin cruiser
- Go-fast boat
- Inboard motor
- Launch (boat)
- List of boat builders
- Motor launch
- Powerboating
- Runabout
- Sterndrive
