= Forrest L. Wood =

American entrepreneur (1932–2020)

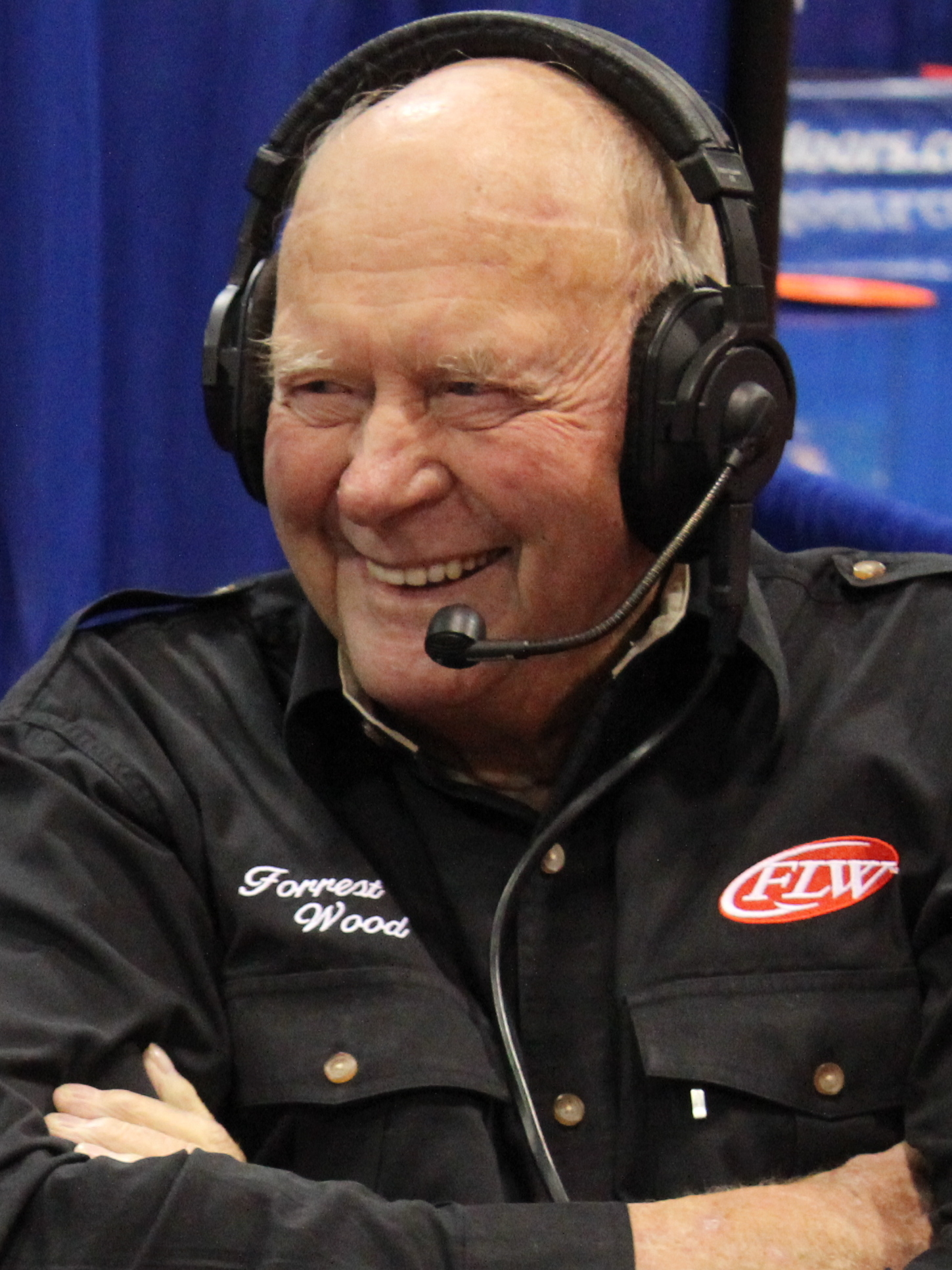
Wood at the 2013 FLW Expo

Forrest Lee Wood (June 9, 1932 – January 24, 2020) was the founder of Ranger Boats, and widely acknowledged as the developer of the modern bass boat. He was also the namesake of the Walmart FLW Tour for sportfishing.

Born in Flippin, Arkansas, Wood began his outdoors career as a fishing guide on numerous lakes and rivers in Arkansas, while maintaining a construction business and a cattle farm. Wood began to build lake boats in 1968 behind a service station. The business moved to an old nightclub; by 1970, Ranger Boats sold 1,200 units. The boats are considered to be the prototypes of what are now called bass boats. The facility was destroyed by fire in 1971, but Wood salvaged orders from his desk in the building and restarted. That same year, Wood qualified for the first-ever Bassmaster Classic. The next year, Wood signed a sponsorship deal with the tournament, making it the Classic's official boat from then until 2000.

Wood sold Ranger Boats in 1987, but remained active in the industry.

In 1996, the tournament organizer Operation Bass renamed itself with Wood's initials, a name it retains to this day.

Wood is a member of the Professional Bass Fishing Hall of Fame, the National Freshwater Fishing Hall of Fame, the International Boating Hall of Fame, National Marine Manufacturers Hall of Fame, Legends of the Outdoors Hall of Fame, Arkansas Game and Fish Hall of Fame, Arkansas Walk of Fame, and the Arkansas Business Hall of Fame. The Arkansas Game and Fish Commission named its Crowley's Ridge Nature Center for Wood, who served a seven-year term on the commission after an appointment by Governor Mike Huckabee from 1998 to 2005.

Wood and his wife of 68 years, Nina, resided in Flippin (where he had large cattle holdings) until his death on January 24, 2020. The couple has four daughters.
