= Downrigger =

Device used while fishing using the trolling method

A downrigger is a device used while fishing using the trolling method, which places a lure at the desired depth. A downrigger consists of a three to six-foot horizontal pole which supports a cannonball, generally 10 to 15 pounds, by a steel cable (generally stainless steel or wire). A clip, also known as a "release," attaches a fishing line to the cannonball weight. The bait or lure is attached to the release.

== Operation of a downrigger ==
Downriggers consist of four major components, the weight, cable, pole or boom, and the spool. A fishing line is attached to the downrigger cable by means of a "line release." The weight is normally a five-to-twenty-pound mass of lead which is connected to the stainless steel cable. The spool is brought up either by a manual crank or via an electric motor.

In addition to attaching a lure to the fishing line, an oval piece of metal or plastic (often hammered or curved for reflective purposes) called a dodger or flasher is often used to attract fish from greater distances. The types of lures used to troll with using downriggers range from metal "spoons" that are often decorated using color tape or paint, plastic or rubber "squids", tinsel beaded flies, or painted plastic J-plugs. These all come in a variety of colors, finishes, and glow patterns for various fishing conditions.

The length of fishing line between the downrigger release and the lure is known as the "lead" and this varies in length depending on how far behind the boat the fisherman would like to lure to trail. This fishing line is typically between ten and twenty pound test. When fishing for salmon this lead is often quite lengthy in order to avoid the fish being frightened by the noise of the boat's trolling motor. When many boats are trolling in a small area this often results in crossed lines and tangles which are a detriment to the fishing experience.

The speed at which the lure is pulled through the water has a great impact on success or failure. For this reason fishermen use devices that accurately track speed. Typically, trolling from one to five knots is the range that allows for fish to be caught. This varies from species to species as Chinook Salmon may prefer higher speeds while the more docile Lake Trout may prefer a much slower-moving lure. Trolling motors are used to calibrate this speed more accurately than large outboard motors. Trolling plates may be used with larger motors to slow the boat to the desired speed, although some anglers experience mixed results using plates.

The downrigger should be set at the depth the target fish are schooling. Different species of fish school at different depths, and those depths also change at different times of year. A fish finder is useful determining this depth.

Using a downrigger may be hazardous. Many manmade reservoirs mask submerged trees and other structure beneath the surface. A downrigger's weight may foul on such objects. When such a snag occurs in conjunction with high winds, it may cause a lighter boat to capsize. It is therefore prudent to carry wire cutters to avoid this potentially lethal scenario.

== Brief history ==
Using a downrigger began in effort to increase productivity of fishing in larger bodies of water. Downriggers are used to troll and maintain the lure's depth in accordance with the thermocline at which the fish species being sought normally feeds. People began using downriggers first in the Great Lakes area. They are now used all over the world to help catch a large variety of fish.

In the Great Lakes, downriggers are used to catch a variety of species including chinook salmon, atlantic salmon, lake trout, brown trout and steelhead.

Recently discovery of an Edward vom Hofe late 1860s-1870s downrigger found local to Niagara Falls and the Salmon River area point to the reelmaker Edward Vom Hofe Brooklyn New York as the father of the modern downrigger. Prior it was thought that the great lakes Michigan anglers had invented the modern rig. However it was intended for the deep water basin fish listed above and most likely prior to the Hydroelectric plant being built on the Niagara River late 1870s. Somehow the device was lost in time due to the construction of the electric plant most likely causing a disruption in the Salmon fishing. Only one of these examples exist today. Not until the 1950s would a device similar to the Vom Hofe design reappear. It is possible that the modern downrigger introduced in the 1950s was copied from another Vom Hofe made device but for now that can not be proven due to the great time span in between the two designs. Edward vom Hofe was a premier tackle smith and reel maker.

There are two main classifications of downriggers today. There are manual downriggers, such as the Scotty Manual Downrigger. There are also electric downriggers such as the Scotty Electric Downrigger. A manual downrigger requires the user to crank the line to retrieve the weight. An electric downrigger utilizes an input screen and has automatic functions controlled by the user with the press of a button.
