= Irwin Jacobs =

Irwin Jacobs may refer to:

- Irwin M. Jacobs (born 1933), co-founder and former chairman and chief executive officer of Qualcomm
- Irwin L. Jacobs (1941–2019), Minneapolis-based investor and chairman of Genmar Holdings
