= Trolling (fishing) =

Practice of fishing by drawing a baited line or lure behind a boat

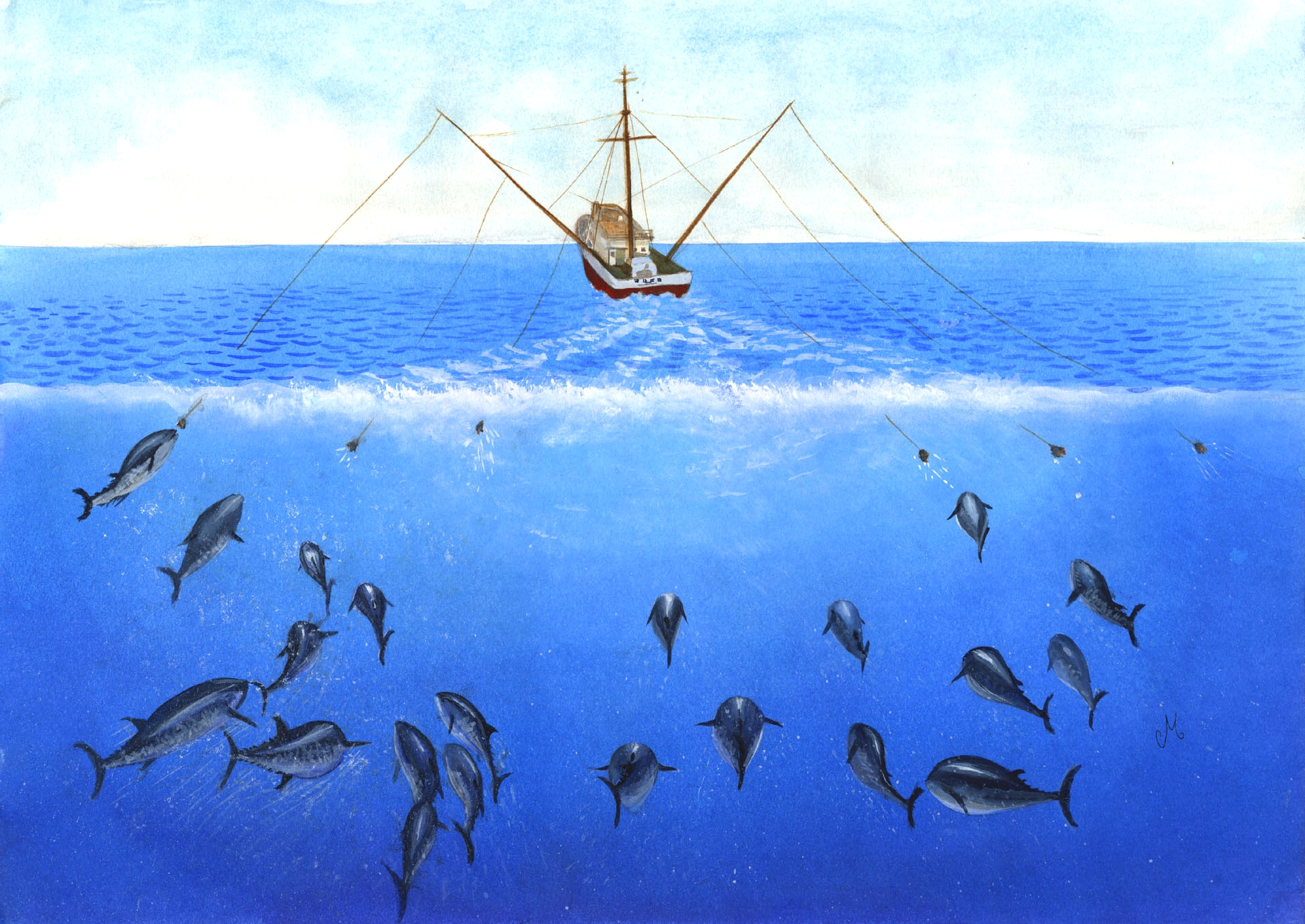
Artist's conception of tuna trolling operation, using outriggers to tow multiple trolling lines and give the appearance of schooling fish

Trolling is a method of fishing where one or more fishing lines, baited with lures or bait fish, are drawn through the water at a consistent, low speed. This may be behind a moving boat, or by slowly winding the line in when fishing from a static position, or even sweeping the line from side-to-side, e.g. when fishing from a jetty. Trolling is used to catch pelagic fish such as salmon, mackerel and kingfish.

In American English, trolling can be phonetically confused with trawling, a different method of fishing where a net (trawl) is drawn through the water instead of lines. Trolling is used both for recreational and commercial fishing whereas trawling is used mainly for commercial fishing.

Trolling from a moving boat involves moving quite slowly through the water. This can be accomplished with the use of a special trolling motor. Multiple lines are often used, and outriggers can be used to spread the lines more widely and reduce their chances of tangling. Downriggers can also be used to keep the lures or baits trailing at a desired depth.

== Line-spreading trolling devices ==
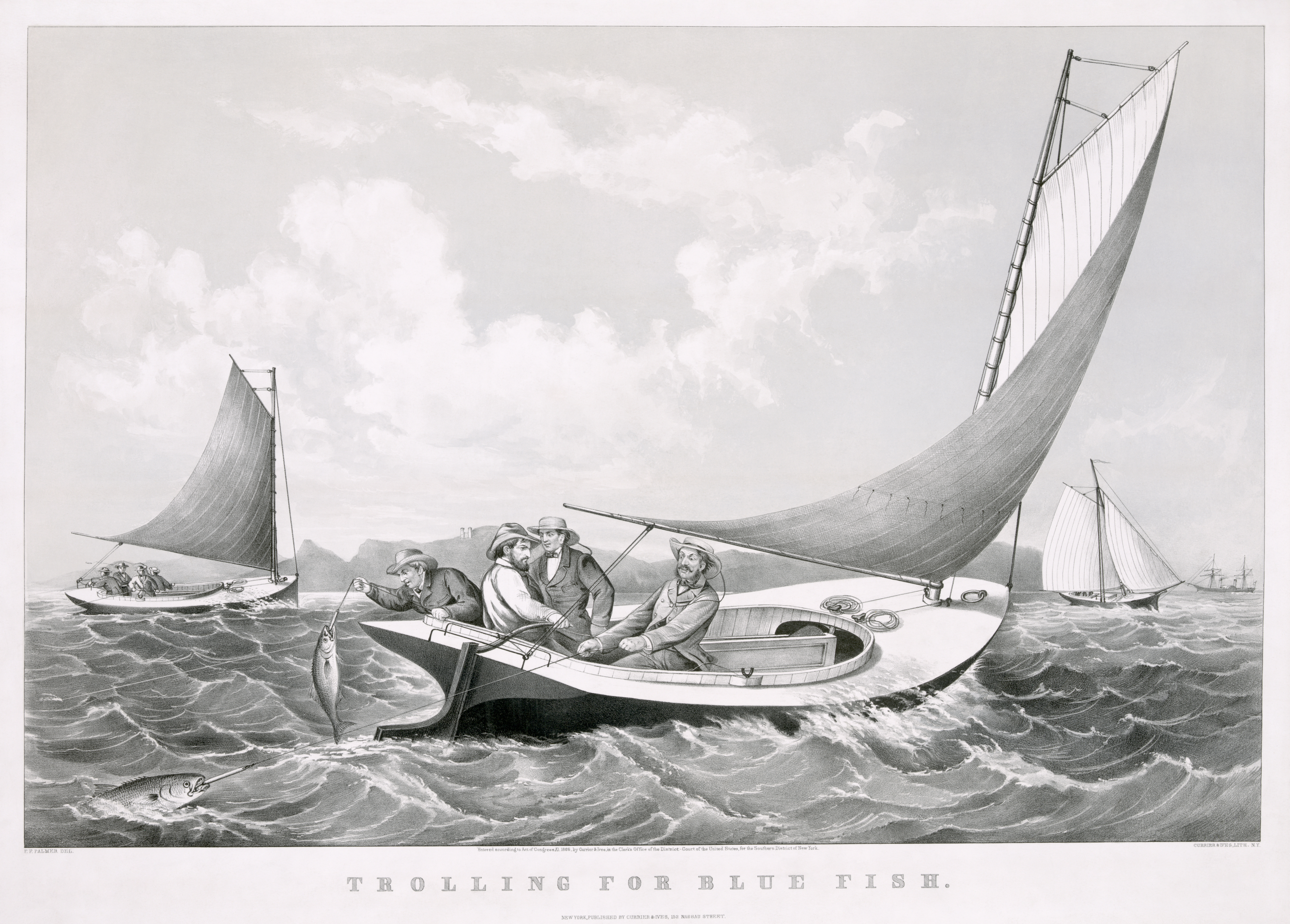
"Trolling for blue fish" lithograph by Currier & Ives, 1866

=== Outriggers ===
Outriggers are poles which allow a boat to troll several lines in the water without tangling. A boat which trolls enough lines can simulate a school of fish.

=== Downrigger ===
Downrigger are devices used while trolling to keep a bait or lure at the desired depth. In practice, fish swim at different depths according to factors such as the temperature and amount of light in the water, and the speed and direction of water currents. A downrigger consists of a one or two metre horizontal pole which supports a weight, typically about 3 kg (6.6 lb) of lead, on a steel cable. A clip called a "line release" attaches the fishing line to the weight, and the bait or lure is attached to the release. The fishing line is reeled in by a spool powered either by manual cranking or by an electric motor. Using a downrigger can be hazardous. For example, man-made reservoirs can contain submerged trees and other structures beneath the surface which downriggers can snag.

=== Paravanes ===
"Paravanes" (underwater kites) are sometimes used as depth controlling devices, particularly in commercial tuna fishing operations. These kites have various shapes, such as arrowhead paravanes, flexi-wing paravanes, and bi-wing paravanes. The devices can place the lure or bait at designated depths and positions; and in this way multiple devices can be towed at the same time without the devices and bait interfering with each other.

=== Spreaders ===
"Spreaders" allow multiple baited hooks or lures to be trolled from a single line. There are many inventive spreader designs, such as devices which cause the baited hooks or lures to move in helical patterns, in a sophisticated emulation of the schooling behaviour of a group of fish.

=== Planer boards ===
"Planer boards" are trolled devices designed to spread fishing lures out away from the fishing vessel. They allow multiple lines to be trolled. They come in dual board and inline board designs. Dual board designs consist of two boards that are spaced apart and attached by a line to a mast near the front of the boat with a separate fishing line in a spring tension release clip that separates when the fishing line is set. Inline boards are attached directly to the fishing line and a spring tension clip that releases upon setting or tripping the planer board so it slides down the fishing line to a swivel tied several feet in front of the lure. Inlines are popular with walleye and wahoo fishermen. Once tripped they offer much less resistance when reeling in a fish.

== Baits and lures ==
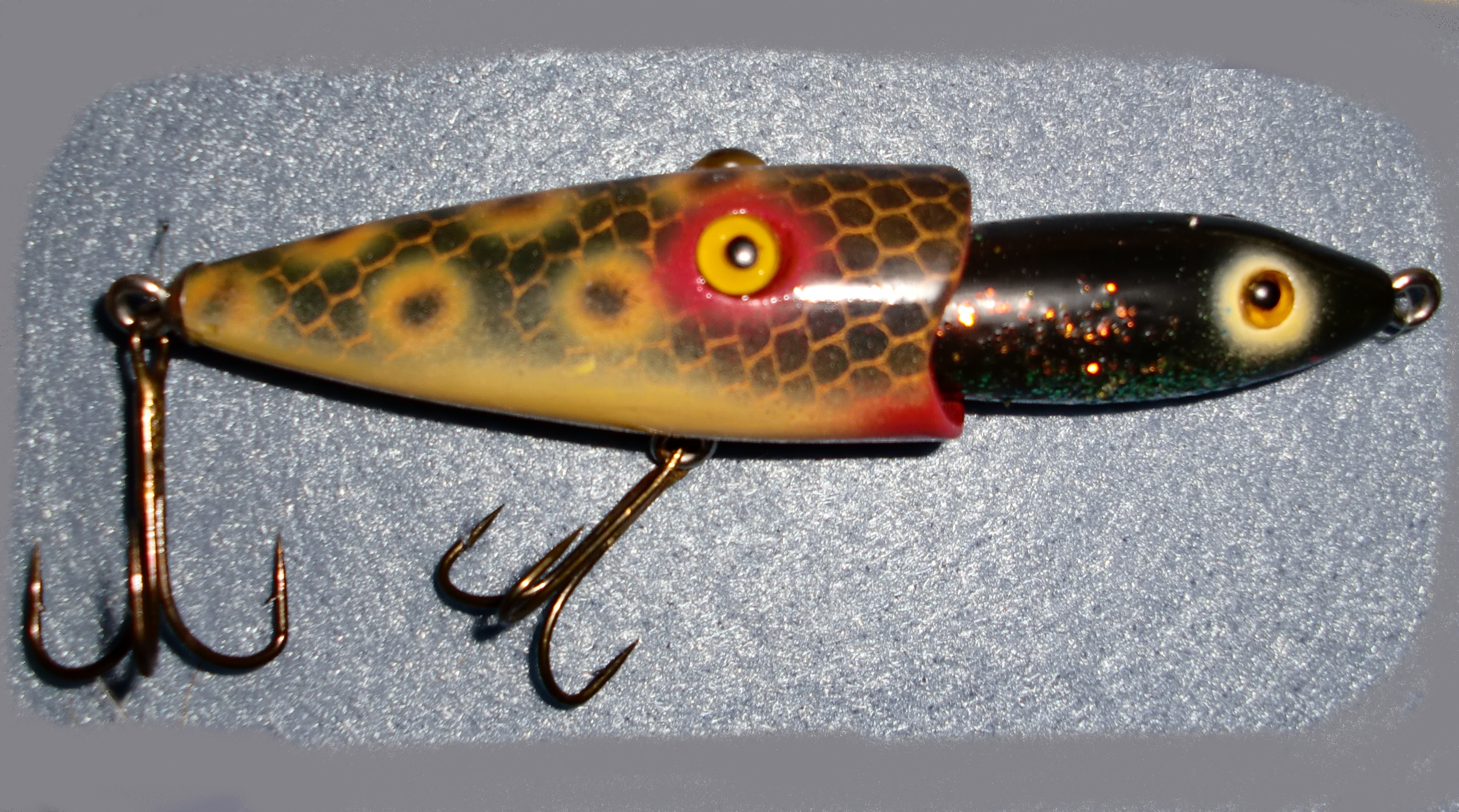
Fishing lures are made in various creative designs like this top-water lure.

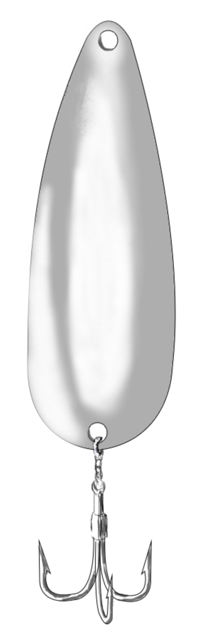
Spoon lure

To be effective, trolling baits and lures must have the visual ability to attract fish and intrigue them with the way they move through the water. Most trolling lures are designed to look and behave like dying, injured, or fast moving fish. They include:

- Surface lures, also known as topwater lures or stickbaits. They float and resemble prey that is on top of the water. They can make a popping sound from a concave-cut head, a burbling sound from "side fins" or scoops or a buzzing commotion from one or several propellers.
- Plugs are also known as crankbaits. These lures have a fishlike body shape and as they troll through the water they make various movements caused by instability due to a scoop under their heads.
- Swimbait, a minnow-like soft plastic bait that is reeled like a plug. Some have swimming tails.
- Spoon lures resemble the bowl of a table spoon. They flash in the light while randomly wobbling or darting due to their shape.
- Spinnerbait, pieces of wire bent at about a 60-degree angle with a hook on the lower end and a flashy spinner mechanism on the upper end.

Trolling baits and lures are either tied with a knot, such as the improved clinch knot, or connected with a tiny safety pin-like device called a "snap" onto the fishing line which is in turn connected to the reel. The reel is attached to a rod. The motion is of the lure is made by winding line back on to the reel, by sweeping the fishing rod, jigging movements with the fishing rod, or by trolling behind a moving boat. Lures can be contrasted with artificial flies, commonly called flies by fly fishers, which either float on the water surface, slowly sink or float underwater, in imitation some form of insect fish food. However some flies, such as the trolling tandem streamer fly, are designed for trolling behind a moving boat.

As an example, marlin lures are typically 7–14 in (18–36 cm) or more long with a shaped plastic or metal head and a plastic skirt. The design of the lure head, particularly its face, gives the lure its individual action when trolled through the water. Lure actions range from an active side-to-side swimming pattern to pushing water aggressively on the surface to, most commonly, tracking along in a straight line with a regular surface pop and bubble trail. Besides the shape, weight and size of the lure head, the length and thickness of skirting, the number and size of hooks and the length and size of the leader used in lure rigging all influence the action of the lure: how actively it will run and how it will respond to different sea conditions. Experienced anglers fine tune their lures to get the action they want. Specialized lures made specifically for trolling swordfish use plastic glow sticks.

A pattern of four or more lures can be trolled at varying distances behind the boat. Lures may be fished either straight from the rod tip ("flat lines"), or from outriggers.

In addition to attaching a lure to the fishing line, an oval piece of metal (often hammered or curved for reflective purposes) called a dodger is often used to attract fish from greater distances. Lures designed for trolling with downriggers include metal "spoons" that are often decorated with colour tape, and plastic or rubber "squids" with various colours.

A daisy chain is a chain of plastic lures which have no hooks. Their purpose is to function as teasers which attract a school of fish closer to the lures that do have hooks.

== Trolling speed ==
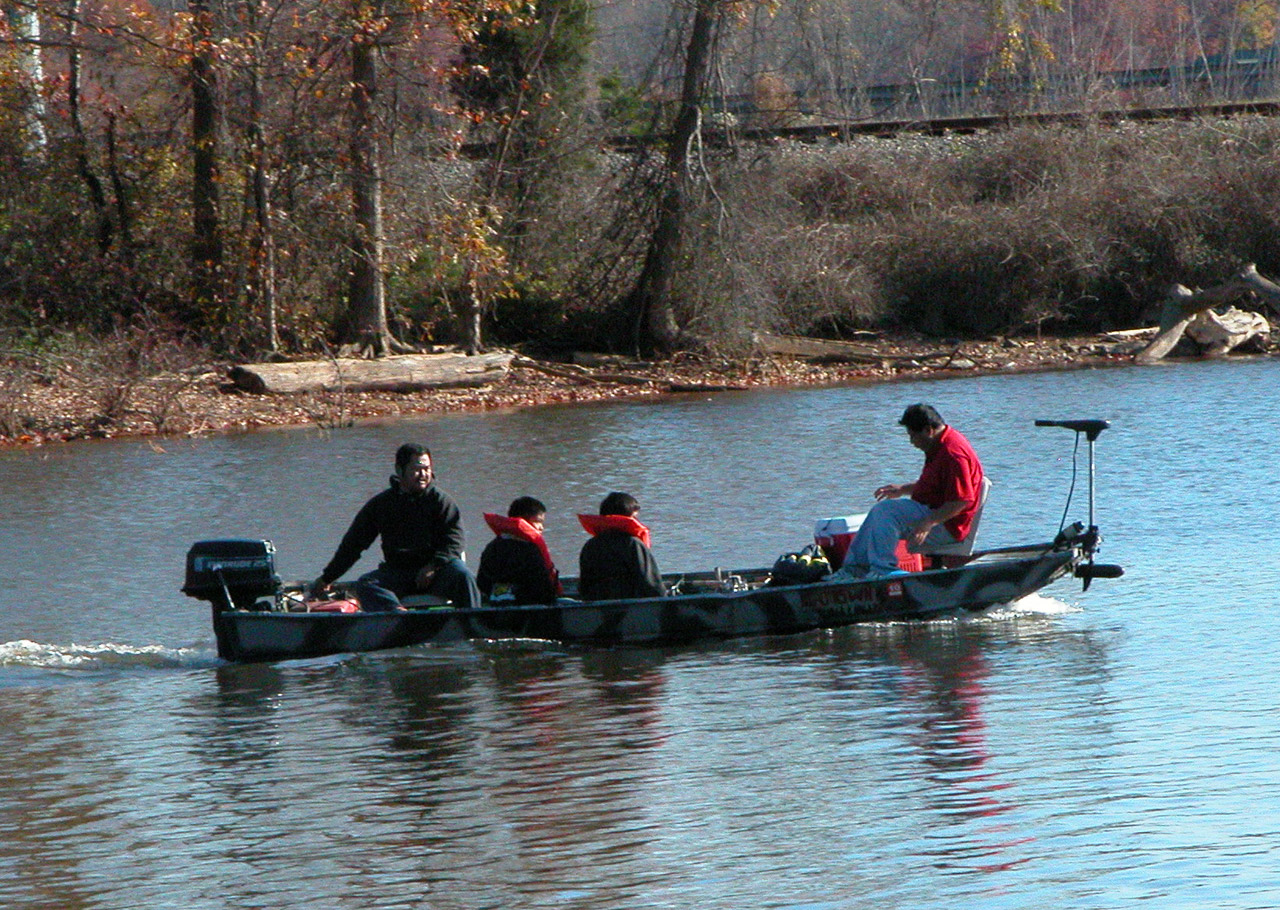
Aluminium bass boat with trolling motor

Baits and lures are typically trolled at speeds up to 9 knots (17 km/h), though speeds up to 15 knots (28 km/h) can be used, particularly when boats are travelling to different fishing areas. The speed at which the lure is pulled through the water impacts on the fishing success. The optimum trolling speed varies with different species of fish, with weather conditions and the time of year, and other conditions. Chinook salmon can be successfully trolled at higher speeds than more docile lake trout. For these reasons fishermen use devices that accurately track speed. Trolling motors calibrate speed more accurately than large outboard motors. Trolling plates are also used with larger motors to slow the boat to the desired speed, although some anglers experience mixed results with plates.

Trolling can be effective at surprisingly low speeds. Kayaks fitted with a deck-mounted bracket for holding a rod can be paddled to troll effectively for salmon.

== Recreational trolling ==
In marine environments, trolling is used in big-game fishing to catch large offshore or open-water species such as tuna and marlin. Saltwater anglers also troll for inshore species such as bluefish, kingfish and various jacks.

Rock fishermen can use an umbrella rig as a method of trolling without using a boat. Typically, an umbrella rig consists of four plastic neon green lures with a lead dragging behind. An additional lure is attached to the lead. Only the lure behind the lead need have hooks attached because this lure can appear to a stalking fish as a wounded or sick laggard in a school, making it a more likely target.

A pattern of multiple baits or lures can be trolled at varying distances behind a boat. Lures can be fished straight from the rod tip (flat line), or from outriggers. Purpose designed sinkers exist to control the trolling depth on freshwater lakes.

Freshwater anglers can also find trolling effective. Recreational fishermen can successfully troll lakes and reservoirs for salmon and trout. It can be the method of choice for catching the elusive muskie, and a useful technique for catching walleye, black bass and striped bass. For light and medium freshwater gamefishing, any reasonably robust casting or spinning rod can be used as a trolling rod. Effective trolling rods should be fairly stiff with a relatively fast action, since "whippy" slow action rods are frustrating to troll with.

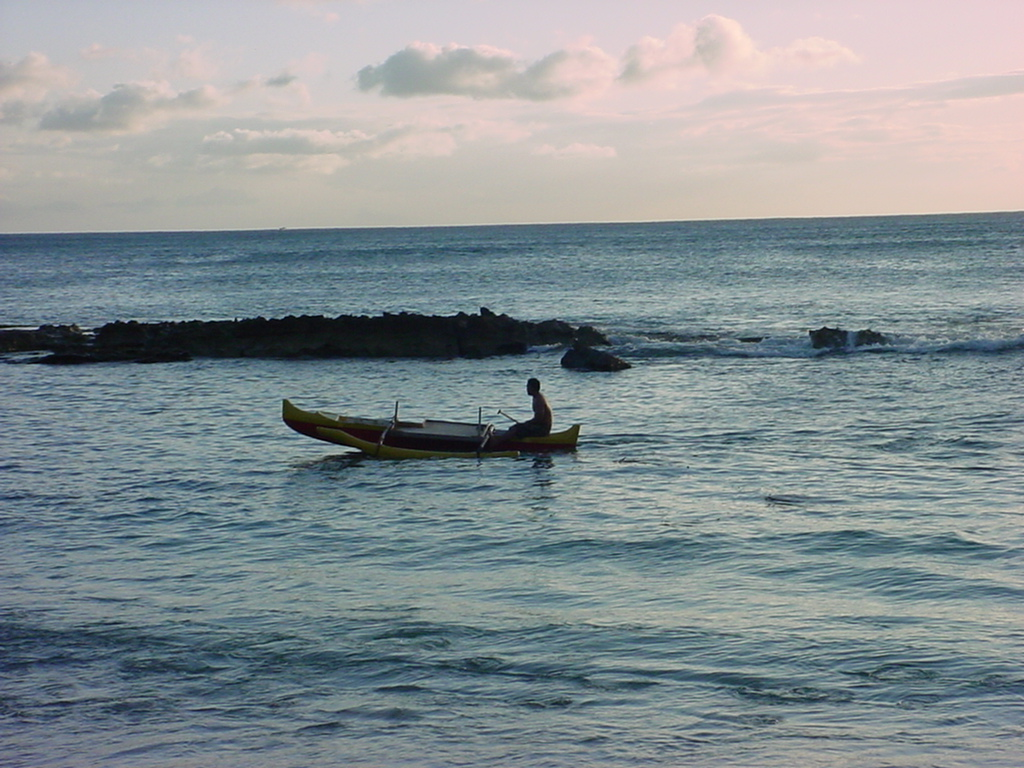
Trolling for fish in Hawaii

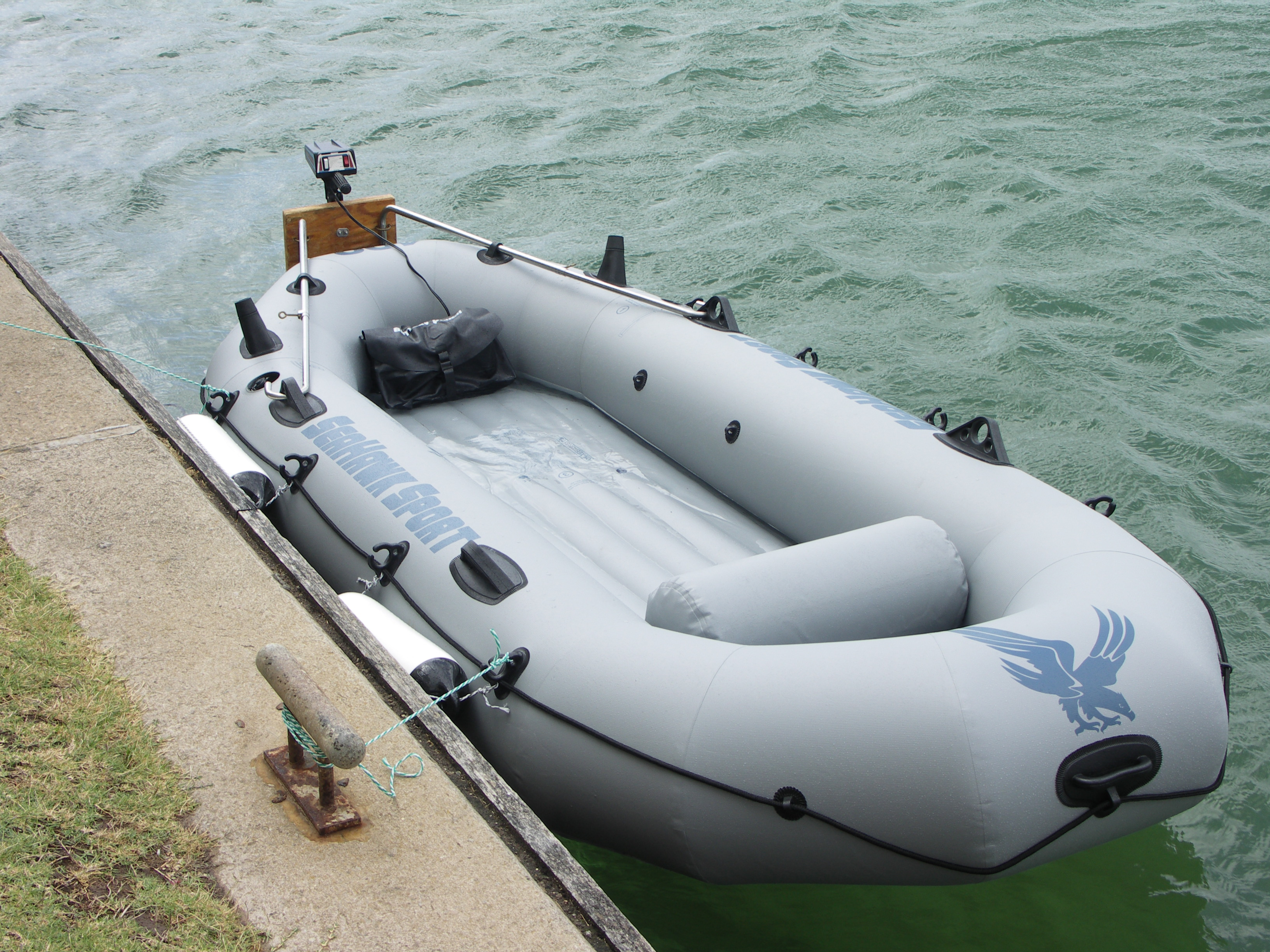
Inflatable boat with small electric trolling outboard motor

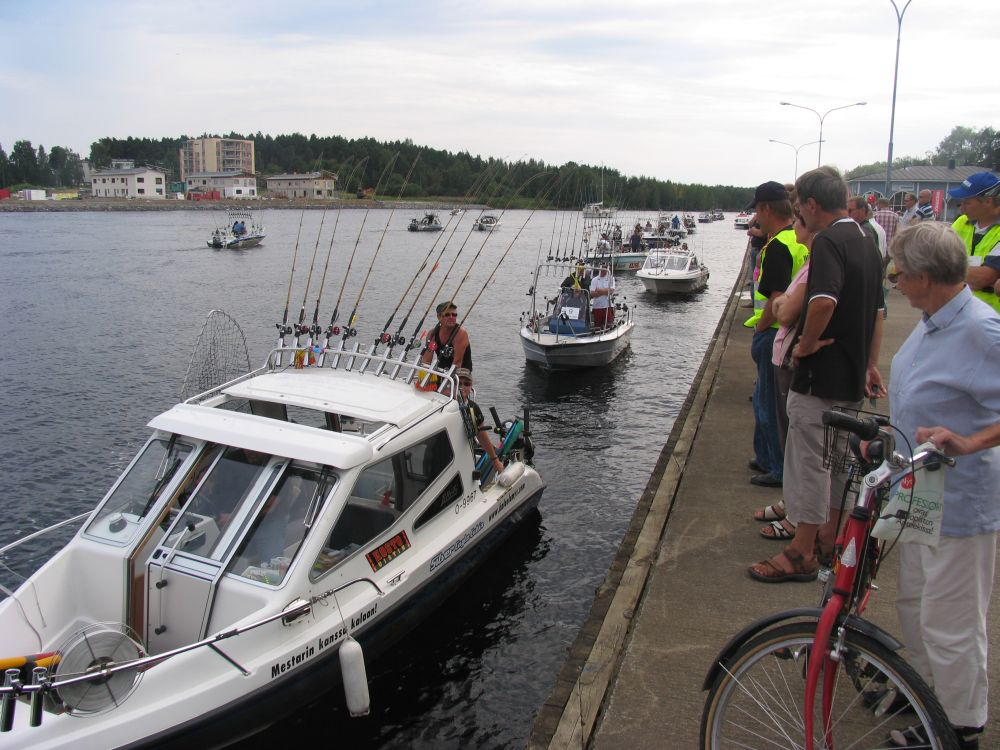
Trolling boats at the Finnish trolling championships

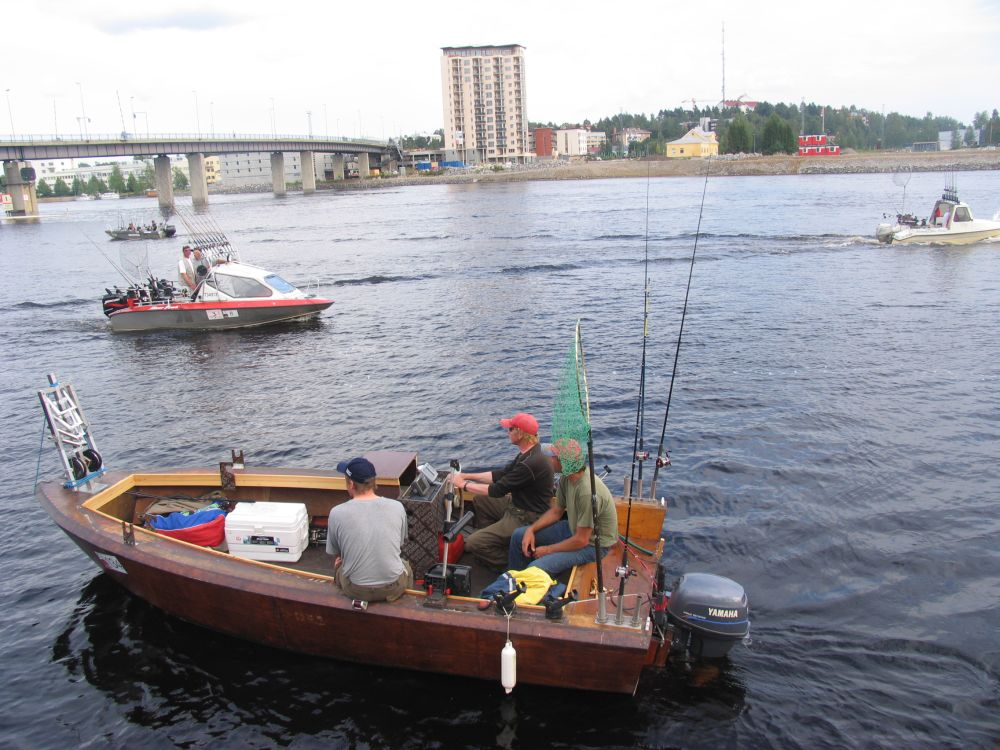
Trolling during the Finnish championships

== Commercial trolling ==
Commercial trolling vessels catch fish by towing astern one or more trolling lines. The trolling lines are fishing lines with natural or artificial baited hooks trailed by a vessel near the surface or at a certain depth. Several lines can be towed at the same time using outriggers to keep the lines apart. The lines can be hauled in manually or by small winches. A length of rubber is often included in each line as a shock absorber. The trolling line is towed at a speed depending on the target species, from 2.3 knots up to at least 7 knots. Trollers range from small open boats to large refrigerated vessels 30 meters long. In many tropical artisanal fisheries, trolling is done with sailing canoes with outriggers for stability. With properly designed vessels, trolling is an economical and efficient way of catching tuna, mackerel and other pelagic fish swimming close to the surface. Purpose-built trollers are usually equipped with two or four trolling booms raised and lowered by topping lifts, held in position by adjustable stays. Electrically powered or hydraulic reels can be used to haul in the lines.

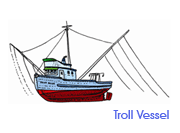
Diagram of a commercial troll vessel using outriggers to tow trolling lines

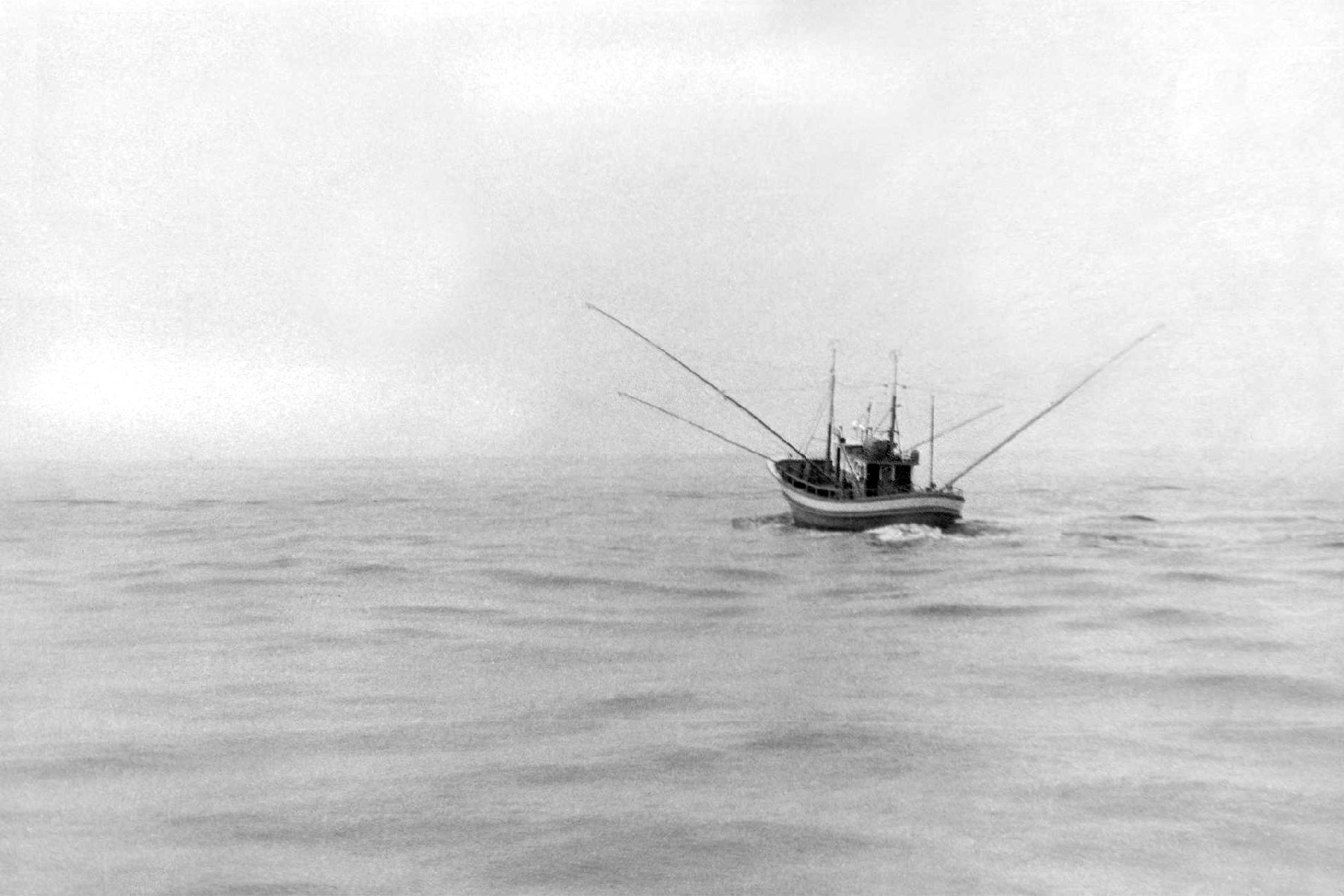
Fishing vessel trolling for tuna in the Atlantic

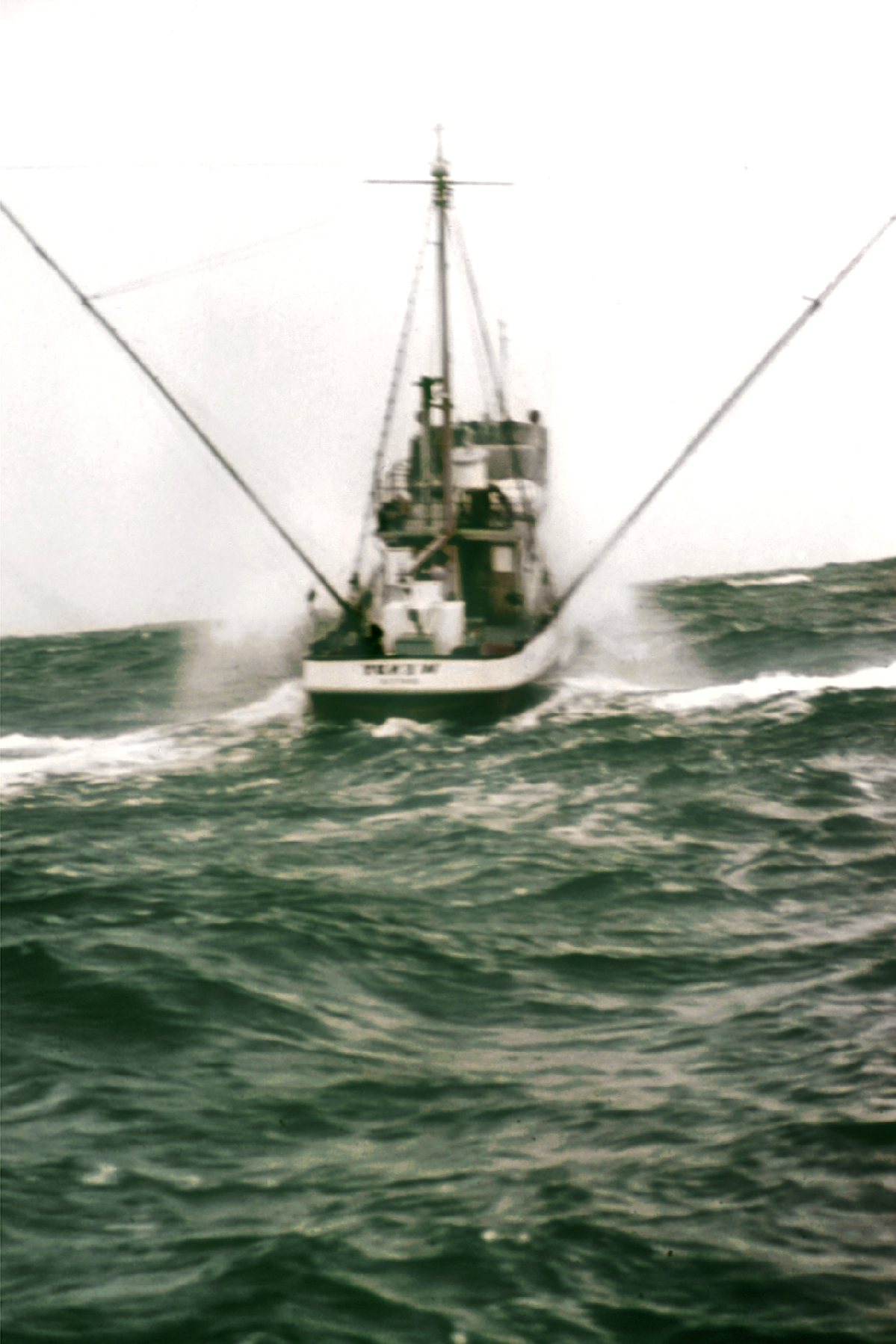
Trolling for tuna in the Pacific

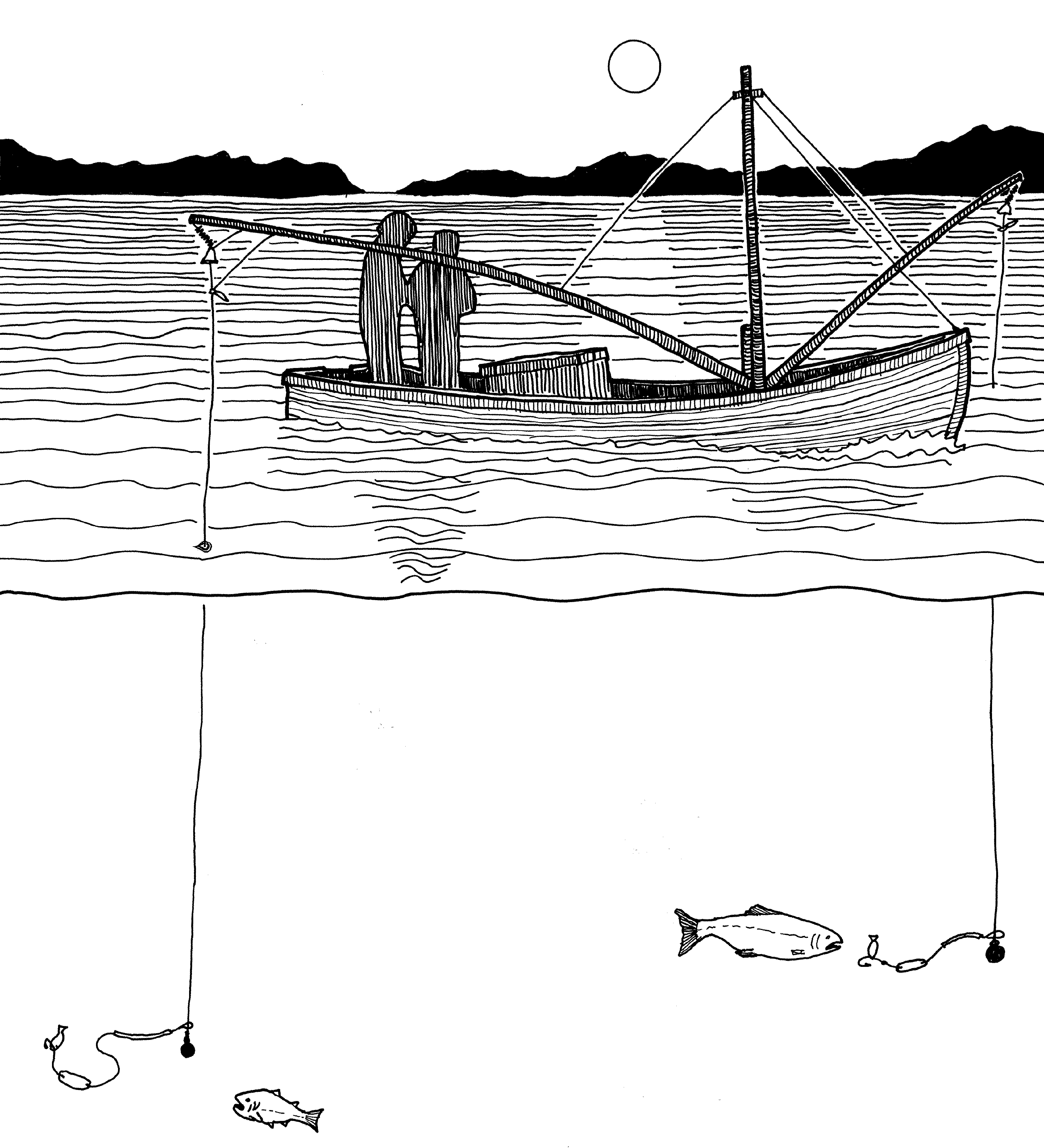
Commercial trolling in Alaska

Commercial trolling for tuna is more successful near offshore banks than in open water areas, and is also enhanced in the vicinity of a fish aggregation device (FAD).

== Historic trolling ==
Historically, in Alaska, hand hook and line trolling were used commercially to catch king and silver salmon in salt water. This method required minimal gear-boat, lines and hooks—and was used to catch fish that were still feeding in open water before returning to spawn. Trolling was very successful in southeast Alaska and historically the catch was used by the fresh and mild-cured fish packing industries. Power boats located near feeding grounds conducted most of the trolling. Each boat had four to ten lines, extending from tall poles hung outboard when fishing; each line carried several hooks, with heavy lead sinkers and spoons or baits as lures. Trolling lengthened the fishing season, allowing fishermen to fish in early spring before spawning runs.

Historic trolling for salmon

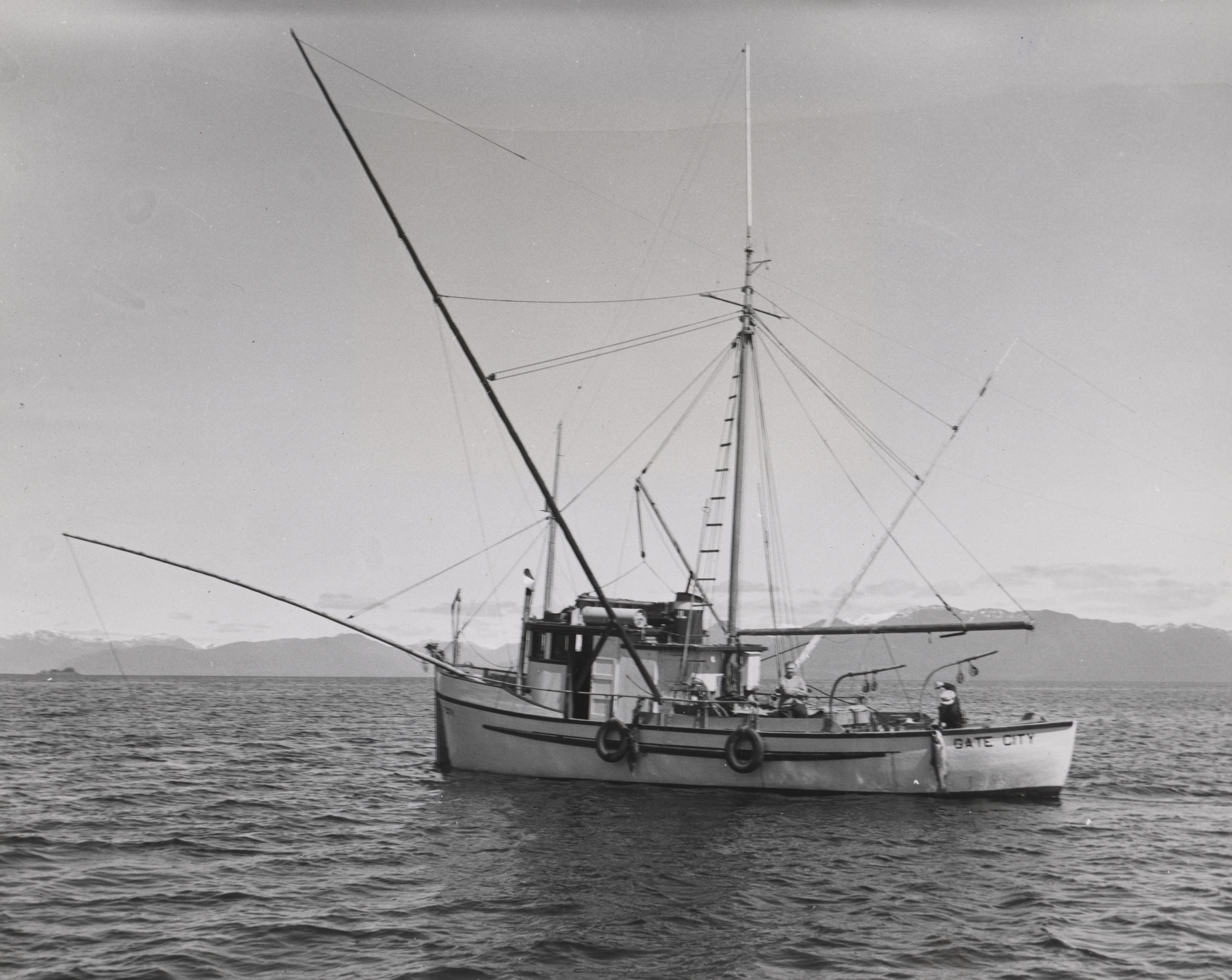
Alaskan salmon troller 1955

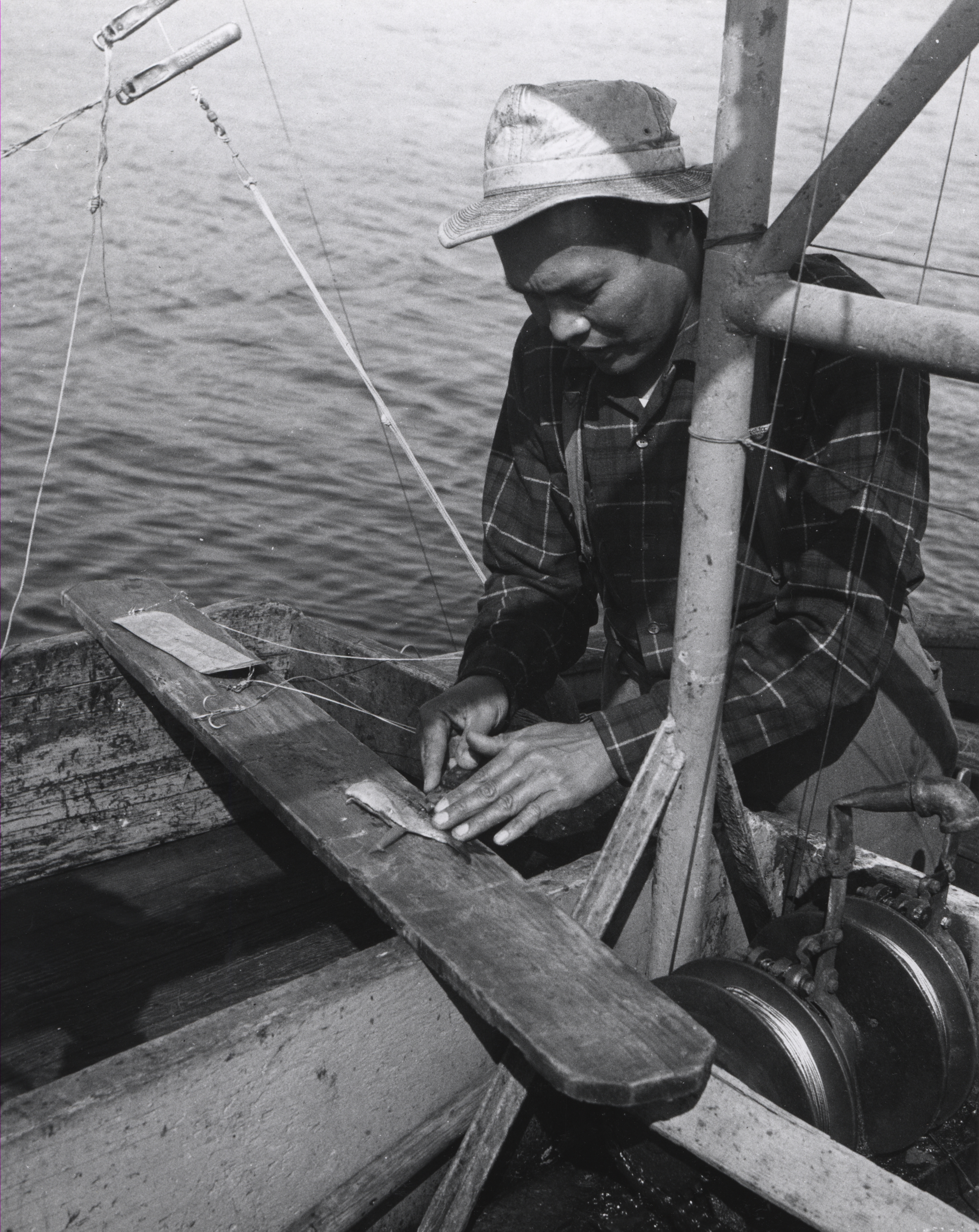
Preparing the bait

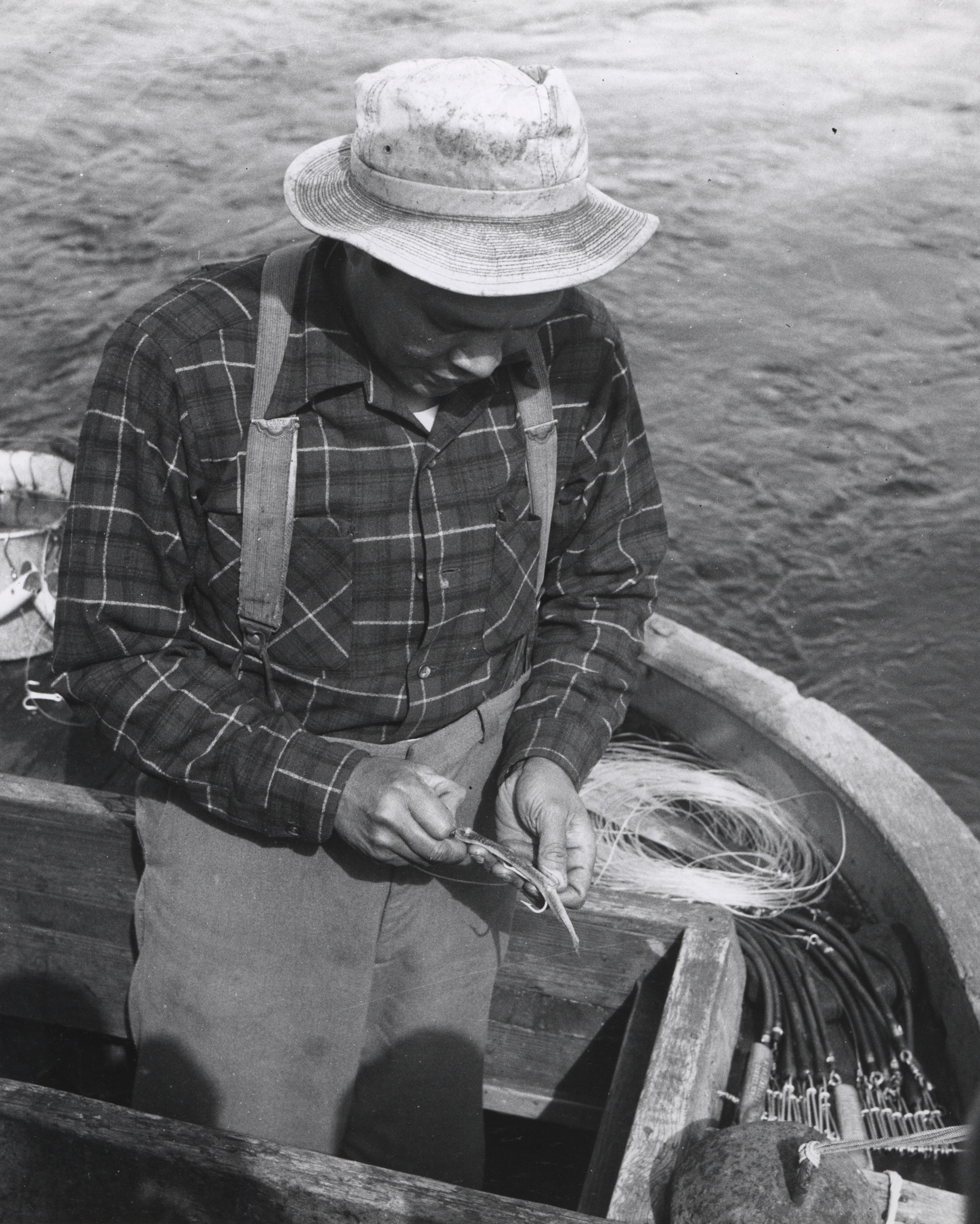
Putting bait on a hook

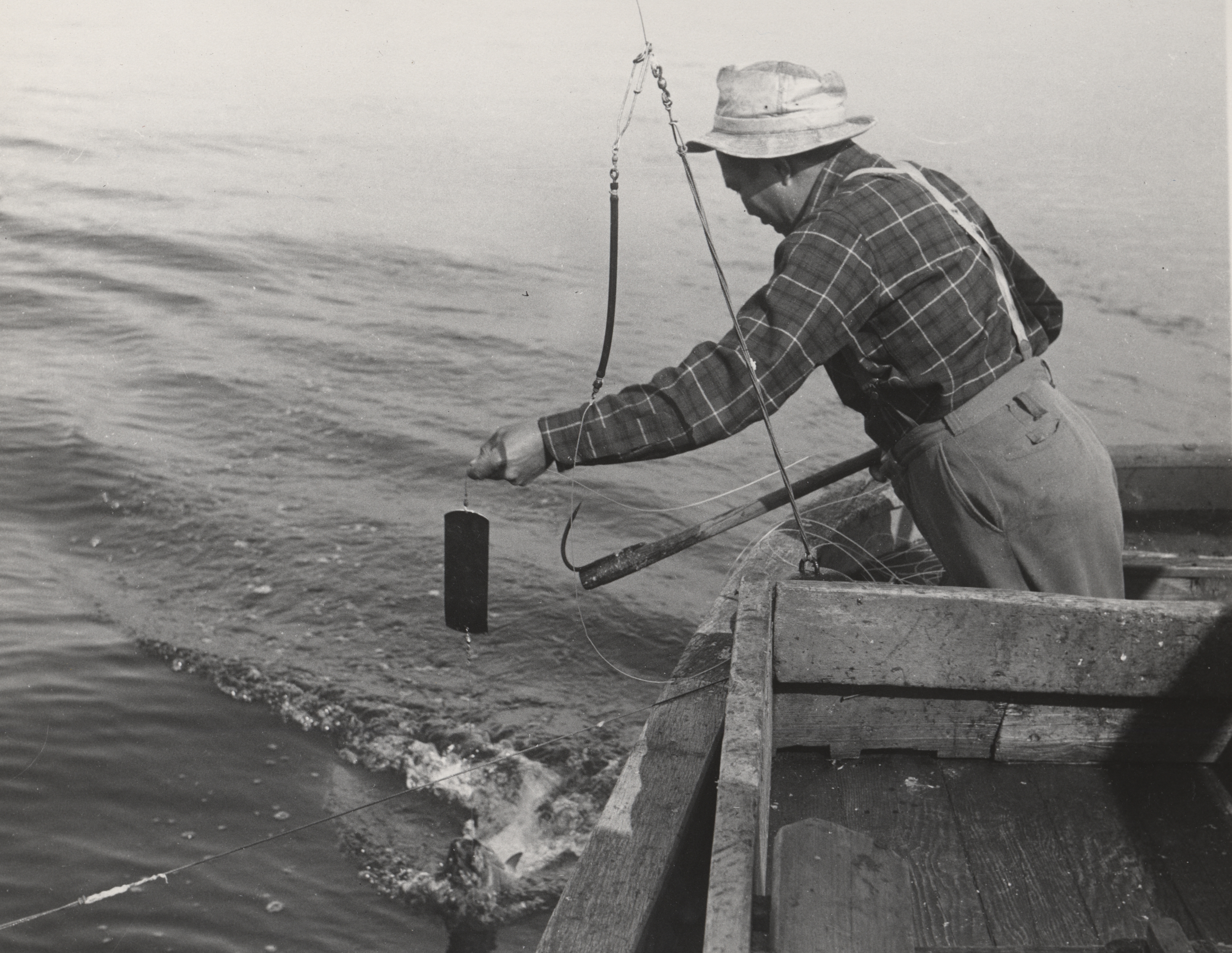
Hauling in a caught salmon

== See also ==
- Longline fishing
