= Irwin L. Jacobs =

American businessman (1941–2019)

- Born: July 15, 1941
- Died: c. April 10, 2019 (aged 77); Orono, Minnesota, U.S.
- Education: University of Minnesota
- Occupations: Investor, entrepreneur
- Known for: CEO of Genmar Holdings; Founder of Cable Value Network
- Spouse: Alexandra Jacobs
- Children: 5

Irwin L. Jacobs (July 15, 1941 – c. April 10, 2019) was an American businessman. He was the CEO of several large corporations, including the boat-building company Genmar Holdings. He earned the nickname "Irv the Liquidator" for his aggressive business practices in the 1970s and early 1980s. In 1973, Jacobs founded COMB ("Close-out Merchandise Buyers"), a catalog-based mail-order retailer. In 1986, COMB and several cable television operators created the Cable Value Network (CVN), a pioneering television shopping channel which was later purchased by Joseph Segel's QVC. Jacobs, based in Minneapolis, became wealthy by taking big stakes in Fortune 500 conglomerates, usually to unlock value by breaking them up.

== Early life ==
Jacobs was born to a Jewish family. He started his career working with his father at his business, the Northwestern Bag Company. He attended the University of Minnesota for one day to be able to continue working for his father.

== Career ==
At the age of 33, Jacobs purchased the ailing Grain Belt Brewery in 1975 for $4.1 million with his company I.J. Enterprises. He tried unsuccessfully for eight months to turn around the company, which was losing nearly $200,000 per month. He then liquidated the company, selling the brand to G. Heileman Brewing Company, and profited $4 million. He later sold the property that accompanied the brewery to the City of Minneapolis in 1989 for $4.85 million.

Jacobs' next deal netted him even more money. He read about W. T. Grant filing for bankruptcy in The Wall Street Journal and decided to purchase their consumer accounts receivable. He soon after that negotiated a deal where he purchased the $276.3 million account for $44 million and 5% of first years sales.

Jacobs also owned a minority share of the Minnesota Vikings, which he sold to Mike Lynn in 1991.

At the time of his death, Irwin Jacobs owned many businesses. The list included Watkins Incorporated, Jacobs Management Corp., Jacobs Industries, Inc., J.Y.J. Corp., C.O.M.B. Co., Federal Financial Corporation, FFC Realty, Watkins, Inc., Northwestern Bag Corporation, Nationwide Collection Service, Inc., 1. Jacobs Enterprises, Kodicor, Inc., Brown-Minneapolis Tank and Fabricating Co., Regional Accounts Corporation, Nationwide Accounts, Corporation, Jacobs Bag Corporation, Lawndale Industries Inc., EQC of Indiana, Inc., Touch Corporation, JMSL Acquiring Corporation, S.J. Industries, Inc., JII Air Service, Inc., P.S.T. Acquiring Corporation, Jacobs Trading, and J&D Acquisitions LLC.

Jacobs founded FLW, the parent organization of the Wal-Mart FLW Tour, a series of sportfishing tours best known for its bass fishing tournaments. They were developed with an eye toward media coverage in general and television coverage in particular.

== Personal life ==
Jacobs lived on a 32-acre estate between Lake Minnetonka and Lake Tanager in the Twin Cities suburb of Orono. The house was originally built in 1939 by the son of James Ford Bell, founder of General Mills, and appeared in a few scenes of the 1972 film The Heartbreak Kid not long before he bought it at age 30 for $340,000. He and his wife, Alexandra Jacobs, raised five children in the home. Alexandra was an accomplished artist and philanthropist. The couple collected eclectic artwork, including a vast array of African ivory purchased from a trader's collection. The Jacobses put the estate on the market in 2014 for $22 million, but it had not changed hands at the time he died in 2019. The historic mansion was demolished in 2021.

By 2019 Alexandra, Jacobs' wife of 57 years, was using a wheelchair and showing signs of dementia, and he was reported to be distraught over her condition. Their daughter Sheila has cerebral palsy, and he was a major supporter of the Special Olympics, for which he once served as chairman after donating $8 million in 1991.

== Death ==
Jacobs and his wife were found dead of gunshot wounds on a bed in their Orono home on the morning of April 10, 2019. A handgun was found next to them. The Hennepin County medical examiner concluded that Irwin Jacobs shot his wife and then himself.
