= Fishing League Worldwide =

Fishing tournament organizer

FLW
- Type: Tournament Organization
- Legal status: Privately Owned
- Purpose: To provide a lifestyle experience that is the best in fishing, on and off the water.
- Headquarters: Benton, Ky., Minneapolis, Minn.
- Location: United States
- Key people: Irwin L. Jacobs; Forrest L. Wood Boyd Duckett
- Staff: 100+
- Formerly called: FLW Outdoors

Fishing League Worldwide (FLW) was the world's largest tournament fishing organization. FLW ran five tournament circuits, four of which offered a path to the largest tournament in professional bass fishing – the Forrest Wood Cup. The organization's initials are taken from Forrest L. Wood, founder of Ranger Boats and developer of the modern bass-fishing boat. The FLW Tour championship - the Forrest Wood Cup - is also named for Wood. In 2007, the tournament was the first to offer a $1 million prize for the winner.

On November 8, 2019, Major League Fishing (MLF) announced that it had completed the acquisition of FLW. The newly created entity, MLFLW, LLC, is owned 100 percent by Major League Fishing, which in turn is owned 50 percent by The Outdoor Channel and 50 percent by Pro Bass Tour (PBT).

== History ==
FLW was founded in 1979 as Operation Bass when Mike Whitaker of Gilbertsville, Kentucky, a former high school teacher and football coach turned electronics salesman, started conducting one-day, weekend bass tournaments. Unlike most tournaments of the day, Whitaker geared his events toward anglers who were unable to take time off from work and travel long distances to participate in high-entry-fee tournaments. Sometimes, these anglers were called "weekend warriors."

The first FLW tournament season followed in 1980 when the company held 12 events in two states and awarded $20,000 in prize money. The company's first tournament was held on Barren River Lake near Glasgow, Kentucky, in March, 1980.

An important point in FLW history occurred July 24, 1996, when Minneapolis businessman Irwin L. Jacobs purchased the company. Jacobs owned FLW until his death in 2018. In 2019 Major League Fishing purchased FLW.

Operation Bass was renamed FLW in 2001 to honor legendary Ranger Boats founder Forrest L. Wood, developer of the modern bass boat. Over the years as FLW has expanded with broader reach around the globe, a new name of Fishing League Worldwide was adopted to better reflect FLW's international presence. FLW still honors their namesake by naming the sport's most lucrative championship after him, the Forrest Wood Cup.

In October 2019 it was announced Major League Fishing had purchased FLW. FLW will continue operating as a subsidiary of MLF.

On September 29, 2020 it was announced that FLW will be fully incorporated into the Major League Fishing brand by early 2021. It will be known as the MLF BIG5.

On September 28, 2023 it was announced that the MLF Pro Circuit would be replaced by the MLF Invitationals ending the former FLW tour.

== Tournament circuits ==
=== FLW Pro Circuit ===
FLW's top tournament circuit was the FLW Pro Circuit (FLW Tour). The Pro Circuit featured a field of 150 anglers competing for a top prize of $125,000 at each tournament and points to qualify for the end of the season championship, the FLW Title. The top 40 anglers will qualify for the Major League Fishing Bass Pro Tour while the bottom 40 will be demoted to the FLW Series.

The FLW Tour was created by businessman Irwin L. Jacobs, owner of Genmar, the world's largest manufacturer of recreational boats (including Ranger, Wood's former company). Jacobs bought a small fishing-tournament promotion company based in Gilbertsville, Kentucky, United States, and renamed the company's tour as the FLW Tour. Jacobs' plan was to turn the tour into the object of major media coverage, with larger cash prizes, a television-friendly competition format, and sponsorships from well-known corporations from outside the fishing industry. Jacobs promptly signed the biggest company of them all — Walmart — which became the title sponsor for the FLW Tour, which was the first such sponsorship in the giant retailer's history. The tour went without Walmart as a title sponsor in 2010, but the retailer signed a new deal that restored the title sponsorship beginning in 2011. That same day, Jacobs also announced that legendary oilman and investor T. Boone Pickens had taken an equity stake and a partnership in the company.

=== Toyota FLW Series ===
The FLW Series was FLW's AAA-level circuit. The Series offered regional anglers a chance to compete close to home for a shot at qualifying for a no-entry fee championship. Twenty four regular-season tournaments were held in eight different divisions around the country. Qualifiers from each division advanced to the FLW Series Championship. The top 40 anglers each year qualified for the FLW Pro Circuit.

=== Phoenix Bass Fishing League ===
The Bass Fishing League (BFL) is for the weekend angler, featuring one-day tournaments in 24 divisions across the country that provide advanced competition and lucrative payouts. Each division will each feature four one-day qualifying tournaments that pay as much as $8,000 to the winning boater and $3,000 to the winning co-angler, plus a two-day super tournament offering top awards of $11,000 and $4,500, respectively. There are six no entry fee regional championships for the top 45 anglers in each division. The top six finishers at each regional qualify for the BFL All-American.

==== Non-bass tours ====
In 2001, FLW expanded beyond bass fishing with a new tour for walleye fishing, for kingfish and redfish in 2005 and for striped bass in 2006. Since 2013, FLW has been exclusively a bass fishing organization.

== Media ==
=== Television ===
==== "FLW" ====
The "FLW" television show aired on the NBC Sports Network (NBCSN), the Pursuit Channel and the World Fishing Network (WFN). The television show, as well as the live web broadcast, was produced by Digital P Media.

=== FLW Magazine ===
The bi-monthly FLW Bass Fishing Magazine highlighted past tournaments as well as offering seasonal tips and techniques and previews of upcoming tournaments. The magazine was available in both print and digital formats.

== See also ==
- Major League Fishing
