= Bass boat =

Motor powered boat

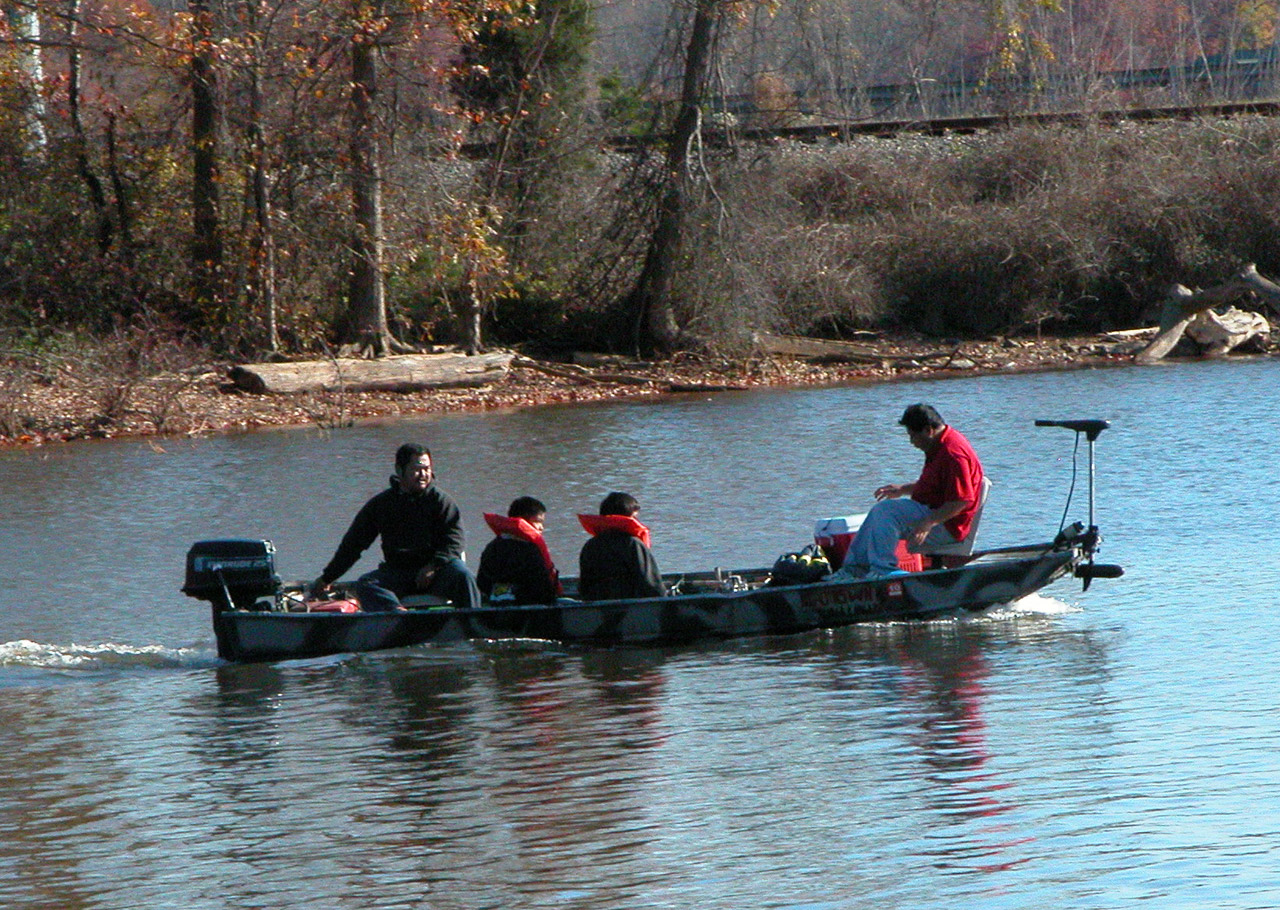
Standard aluminum bass boat, with trolling motor

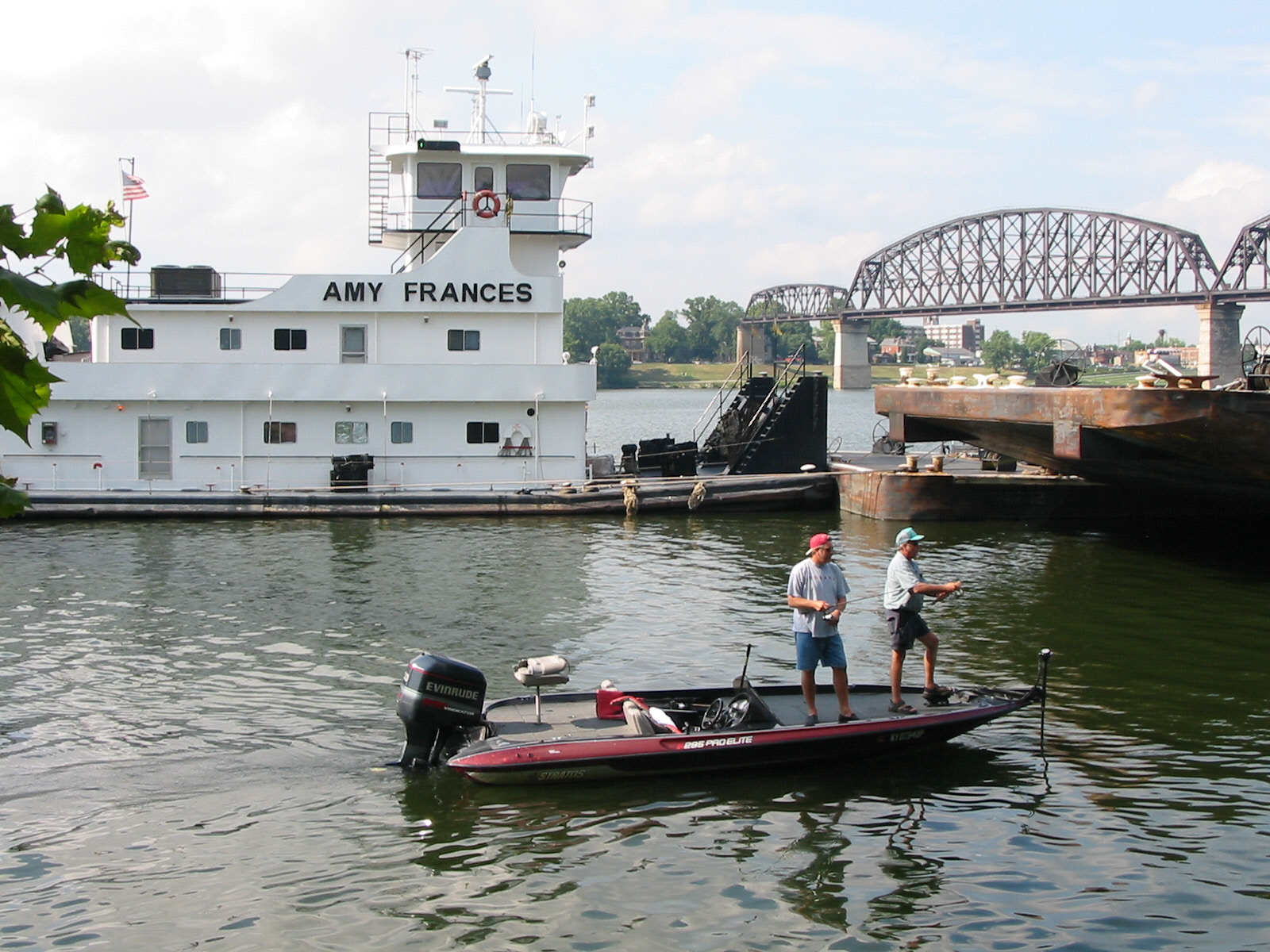
Two anglers on a modern Stratos 285 Pro Elite fiberglass bass boat with elevated foredeck, pedal-controlled trolling motor, recessed central cockpit, an aftdeck swivel chair, and an Evinrude motor at the stern

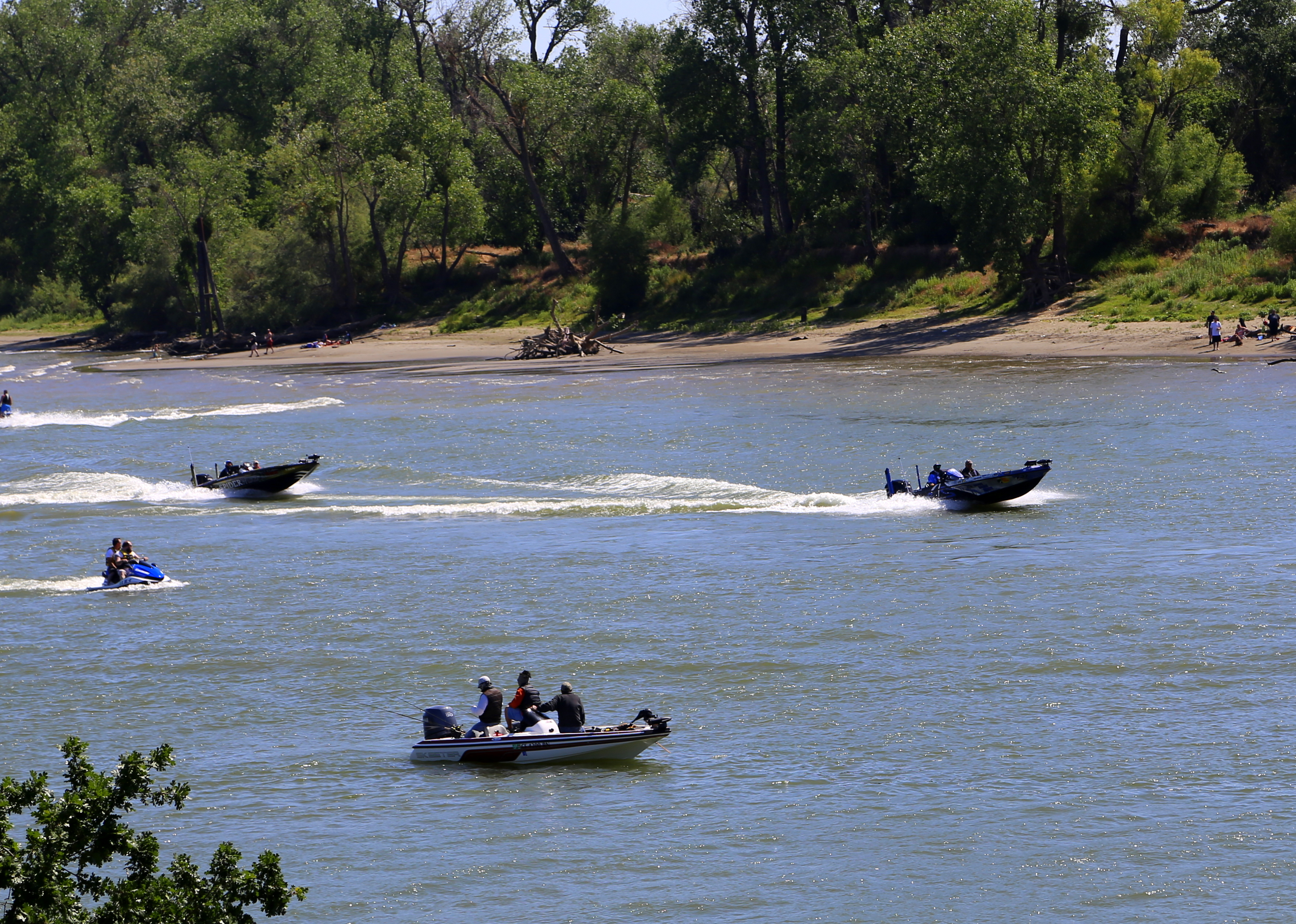
Two bass boats speeding across Sacramento River during a Bassmaster Elite competition

A bass boat is a small boat that is designed and equipped primarily for bass fishing, usually in freshwater bodies such as lakes, rivers and wetlands. The modern bass boats are motorboats that feature an elevated flat front deck with swivel chairs that permit the angler to readily cast to any direction while sitting, large storage compartments for fishing tackles and gears such as extra rods, reels and lures, high-performance fishfinders/sounders, and a recirculating livewell where caught fish may be stored alive for prolonged periods of time.

Bass boats are usually propelled by two means: one or (less commonly) two outboard motors at the stern, which allow the boat to cruise swiftly from place to place; and a trolling motor at the bow, which maneuvers the boat at a slow, steady through shallow, grassy areas where the angler is fishing. Should those motors fail, bass boats are often small and light-weight enough to be propelled by oars in an emergency. Bass boats are typically either constructed of aluminum alloy or fiberglass, with the former being lighter and typically smaller and less expensive than the latter. Fiberglass bass boats, however, offer more space, better handling, and the ability to house larger, more powerful outboard motors.

The developer of the modern bass boat is widely considered to be Skeeter Fishing Boats, a company now owned by Yamaha. In 1948 Holmes Thurmond patented the first Skeeter boats design, originally built by the Elders of Marshall, TX. By no means was it the last "first" for Skeeter. In 1961, he built the first bass boat from fiberglass, a huge leap forward in performance and durability. Other well-known bass boat manufacturers include Ranger, Nitro, Tracker, Triton, Stratos, Bass Cat, Champion, Lowe, G3, and Xpress.

An older usage of the term “bass boat” refers to a type of sport fishing boat once popular for fishing for striped bass off the Atlantic Coast of the United States. These bass boats were about 25 feet (7.6 m) long and featured a hull form similar to a New England lobster boat with a sharp entry, rounded bilges, and relatively little deadrise at the stern. They were powered with inboard engines and had a top speed of about 20 knots (37 km/h; 23 mph). The typical deck configuration featured a long cockpit with a windshield at the forward end and a cuddy cabin in the bow. Examples still in production include the Fortier 26 and the Dyer 29. Some outboard-powered sport fishing boats emulate bass boat styling, including the Steiger Craft Block Islands and the Parker 2310 and 2510; however, these boats have a more sharply V-shaped hull form and are designed for higher speeds.

== Advances in technology ==
Bass boat technology has come a long way in recent years, with advancements in materials, design, and electronics. One major development has been the use of lightweight and durable materials, such as carbon fiber and fiberglass, which allow for faster speeds and improved maneuverability. Additionally, manufacturers have focused on reducing weight in other areas, such as the trailer and engine, to improve overall performance.

In terms of design, bass boats now feature sleeker profiles and improved aerodynamics, with features such as raised casting decks and wider beams to increase stability and improve the angler's ability to cast and reel in fish. The hulls have also been refined to provide better handling in a variety of water conditions. Furthermore, the introduction of advanced electronics, such as GPS navigation systems and fish finders, has revolutionized the way anglers approach fishing, enabling them to quickly locate fish and navigate waterways with ease.

== See also ==
- Black bass
- Recreational fishing
