= Sea Hunt =

American action adventure television series from 1958 to 1961

- Genre: Action Adventure
- Created by: Ivan Tors; James Buxbaum
- Developed by: Ivan Tors
- Starring: Lloyd Bridges
- Narrated by: Lloyd Bridges
- Theme music composer: David Rose (as "Ray Llewellyn")
- Opening theme: "The Sea Hunt Theme"
- Ending theme: "The Sea Hunt Theme"
- Composer: David Rose
- Country of origin: United States
- Original language: English
- No. of seasons: 4
- No. of episodes: 155

Production
- Executive producers: Frederick Ziv; Maurice Ziv
- Producers: Herbert L. Strock; Ivan Tors
- Cinematography: Monroe P. Askins; Edward Cronjager; Robert Hoffman
- Editors: James Buxbaum; Charles Craft; Harold V. McKenzie; Thomas Scott
- Camera setup: Single-camera
- Running time: 30 minutes
- Production company: Ziv Television Programs

Original release
- Network: Syndication
- Release: January 4, 1958 – September 23, 1961

Sea Hunt is an American action-adventure television series that aired in syndication from 1958 to 1961 and was popular for decades afterwards. The series originally aired for four seasons, with 155 episodes produced. It stars Lloyd Bridges as former Navy diver Mike Nelson, and was produced by Ivan Tors.

== Development ==
Series executive producer Ivan Tors conceived the idea for Sea Hunt while working on the 1958 film Underwater Warrior. He tried in vain to sell the series to all three major networks, but they passed on it because they felt that a series set underwater could not be sustained. Tors then decided to sell it into the first-run syndication market. He teamed up with Ziv Television Programs and was able to sell it to more than 100 syndicated markets before it debuted in January 1958.

Lloyd Bridges was cast as lead character Mike Nelson. Sea Hunt was intended as a comeback vehicle for Bridges due to his brief black-listing from acting. He was restricted from mainstream Hollywood roles after admitting to the House Un-American Activities Committee that he had been a member of the Actors' Laboratory Theatre, a group that was tied to the Communist Party.

Bridges served in the United States Coast Guard during the Second World War and afterwards joined the Coast Guard Reserve, so was already familiar with oceangoing ships. He took a crash course in scuba diving by Zale Parry and Courtney Brown; Brown later served as his underwater stunt double. Bridges was also educated in the use of scuba equipment by Brad Pinkernell on the beach in Southern California from 1956 to 1957, after a chance meeting when Pinkernell was coming out of the ocean while wearing scuba gear.

Over the course of the show's run, Bridges got more involved in the underwater stunt work, graduating from close-ups in the earliest episodes to doing all but the most dangerous stunts by the end of the series' run.

== Synopsis ==
Mike Nelson (Lloyd Bridges) is a free-lance scuba diver, a former Navy frogman, who left the service about four years before the series begins, and member of the United States Coast Guard Auxiliary. He is a well-known expert on diving, who is often called on for difficult or dangerous projects. He travels on his boat the Argonaut and outmaneuvers villains, salvages everything from a bicycle to a nuclear missile, rescues children trapped in a flooded cave, and other such adventures. In the pilot episode, he rescues a Navy pilot from his sunken jet. No dialogue was possible during the underwater sequences, so Bridges provided voice-over narration for all the installments. Nelson also educated non-diving characters in various aspects of diving and the underwater world.

The series made frequent references to Marineland of the Pacific, which provided facilities, resources, and technical advice to the production company. At the end of each episode, Bridges appeared as himself to deliver a brief comment, which sometimes included a plea to viewers to understand and protect the marine environment, along with gems of wisdom from Bridges' own experiences. A number of notable actors appeared on the series early in their career, including Leonard Nimoy, Bruce Dern, Robert Conrad, Ross Martin, Robert Clarke, Larry Hagman, Larry Pennell, Ken Curtis, William Boyett, Jack Nicholson, Sal Ponti, and Bridges' own sons Beau and Jeff.

== Production notes ==
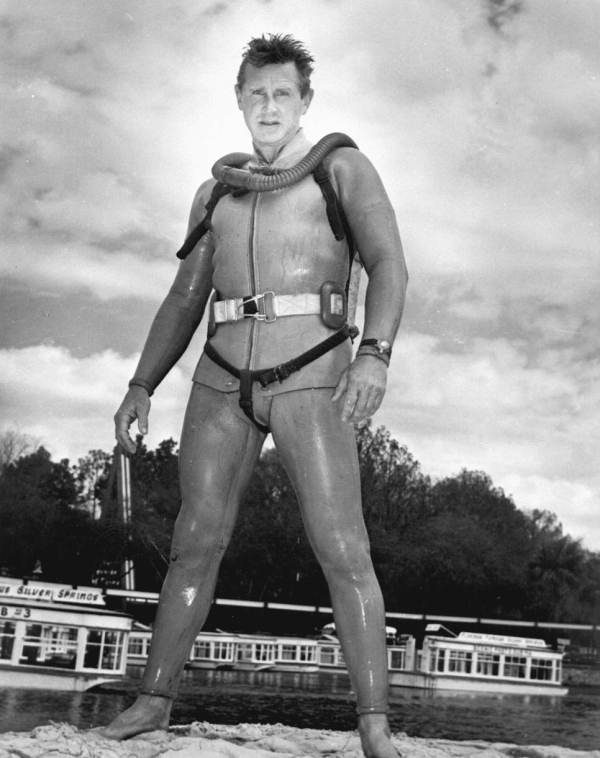
Lloyd Bridges as Mike Nelson

Underwater sequences were often created during post-production from individual scenes shot at many different locations, including studio tanks and various underwater sites in California, Florida, and the Bahamas. Much stock footage was shot and later mixed with episode-specific character footage. Filming locations included:

- Marineland of the Pacific (park operated 1954–1987)
- The front side of Santa Catalina Island, California
- Paradise Cove west of Malibu
- Silver Springs, Florida
- Cypress Gardens, Florida
- Tarpon Springs, Florida
- Nassau, Bahamas
- Grand Bahama Island

On-land location shots were filmed throughout Los Angeles, central Florida, Nassau, and on a sound stage. Famous divers such as Zale Parry and Albert Tillman were involved in production of the show, as was Jon Lindbergh, son of aviator Charles Lindbergh. Parry was joined in 1960 by 18-year-old Wende Wagner as a female underwater stunt double. Pioneering underwater cinematographer Lamar Boren shot nearly all of the underwater footage for the series. John Lamb shot the underwater sequences for both the movie and TV versions of Irwin Allen's Voyage to the Bottom of the Sea and also filmed some episodes of Sea Hunt. Stunt diver Ricou Browning is credited with co-ordination of the underwater action sequences during the second season.

The boat used in the series was named the Argonaut after the mythological Greek heroes who sailed with Jason on the quest of the Golden Fleece. Several cabin cruisers were used in filming, and one notable model was the Trojan Express, custom built by Trojan Yachts in 1960 with mahogany planking and teak decks and trim, measuring 33 feet long and 12 feet wide. Diving equipment was supplied by Voit and a Navy depth gauge supplied by Sportsways, Inc. Wetsuits were made by the small Los Angeles shop Dive N' Surf, which was the genesis for Body Glove.

David Rose is credited with music, although a number of the Sea Hunt stock cues are heard in Buchanan Rides Alone, a 1958 Columbia Western film that used stock music from composers including Mischa Bakaleinikoff, George Duning, Heinz Roemheld, and Paul Sawtell.

== Reception ==
Sea Hunt proved to be popular with viewers and was a hit throughout its four-season run. It became one of the best-remembered and most-watched syndicated series in the United States. During the first nine months of its debut, it was number one in the ratings. The show attracted half of the viewing audience in 50 major cities and averaged 59% of audiences in New York City. Producer Ivan Tors later estimated that 40 million people viewed the series weekly.

According to New York Times writer Richard Severo, "Late-night comedians, especially Johnny Carson, used to tell jokes derived from the frequency with which Mr. Bridges, always fit and trim and looking forever like a slightly aging quarterback, was seen daring the fates underwater or emerging from the sea unscathed despite sharks, shipwrecks, and assorted malefactors". Severo noted that TV Guide once described the show as "an epic so watery that Lloyd Bridges's colleagues tell him they have to drain their TV sets after watching his show".

Sport Diver magazine wrote that Sea Hunt has had a "lasting impact" on the hobby of scuba diving, and cited a yearly event held in Florida called Sea Hunt Forever, where divers don vintage gear and re-enact scenes from the TV series.

== Cancellation ==
Despite its solid ratings, Sea Hunt was canceled in 1961 due to the dwindling first-run syndication market. The series ran for a total of 155 episodes.

== Syndication ==
Sea Hunt went into reruns in 1961, and has aired on various channels since. The series currently airs on weekdays on This TV and Light TV, two classic television and movie networks carried on digital subchannels of local stations around the US.

== 1987 revival series ==
A revival of the series appeared in syndication in 1987, starring Ron Ely as an older Nelson and Kimberly Sissons as his daughter Jennifer. Ely had starred in a companion undersea adventure series called The Aquanauts during the original Sea Hunt's run. For budgetary reasons, land scenes from this second series were filmed in Canada (specifically Victoria, British Columbia), despite the stories being set in Florida. Underwater scenes were filmed in tropical locations.

The updated version of Sea Hunt was canceled after only one season.

== Legacy ==
The Terranea Resort restaurant Nelson’s in Rancho Palos Verdes, California, is named after the character Lloyd Bridges played in Sea Hunt, Mike Nelson, which was filmed in the waters by the cliffs of Terranea.

== Episodes ==
=== Series overview ===
Season	Episodes	Originally released	
Season	Episodes	First released	Last released
1	39	January 4, 1958	October 4, 1958
2	39	January 4, 1959	September 27, 1959
3	39	January 9, 1960	October 1, 1960
4	38	January 7, 1961	September 23, 1961

==== Revival series ====
Season	Episodes	Originally released	
Season	Episodes	First released	Last released
1	22	September 25, 1987	February 19, 1988

=== Season 1 (1958) ===
No. overall	No. in season	Title	Directed by	Written by	Original release date
1	1	"Sixty Feet Below"	Felix Feist	Arthur Weiss	January 4, 1958
2	2	"Flooded Mine"	Leon Benson	Gene Levitt	January 11, 1958
3	3	"Rapture of the Deep"	Anton M. Leader	Ellis Marcus	January 25, 1958
4	4	"Mark of the Octopus"	Andrew Marton	Arthur Weiss	February 1, 1958
5	5	"The Sea Sled"	Lloyd Bridges	Ellis Marcus	February 8, 1958
6	6	"Female of the Species"	Herbert L. Strock	Ellis Marcus	February 15, 1958
7	7	"Mr. Guinea Pig"	John Florea	Stuart Jerome	February 22, 1958
8	8	"Sonar Queen"	Leon Benson	Peter R. Brooke	March 1, 1958
9	9	"Gold Below"	Leon Benson	Gene Levitt	March 8, 1958
10	10	"Recovery"	Leon Benson	Jack Rock	March 15, 1958
11	11	"Killer Whale"	Andrew Marton	Arthur Weiss	March 22, 1958
12	12	"Midget Submarine"	Andrew Marton	Arthur Weiss	March 29, 1958
13	13	"The Shark Cage"	Leon Benson	Lou Huston	April 5, 1958
14	14	"Hardhat"	Johnny Florea	Peter R. Brooke	April 12, 1958
15	15	"Continental Rift"	Johnny Florea	Lee Erwin	April 19, 1958
16	16	"The Poacher"	Johnny Florea	Stephen Kandel	April 26, 1958
17	17	"Girl in the Trunk"	Leon Benson	Stuart Jerome	May 3, 1958
18	18	"The Sponge Divers"	Leon Benson	Lee Erwin	May 10, 1958
19	19	"Diamond River"	Johnny Florea	Stephen Kandel	May 17, 1958
20	20	"Alligator Story"	Leon Benson	Stanley H. Silverman	May 24, 1958
21	21	"Magnetic Mine"	Leon Benson	Arthur Weiss	May 31, 1958
22	22	"Underwater Patrol"	Johnny Florea	Jack Rock	June 7, 1958
23	23	"Legend of the Mermaid"	Leon Benson	Lee Erwin	June 14, 1958
24	24	"Pressure Suit"	Johnny Florea	Peter R. Brooke	June 21, 1958
25	25	"The Prospectors"	Leon Benson	George Asness	June 28, 1958
26	26	"The Hero"	Leon Benson	Stanley H. Silverman	July 5, 1958
27	27	"Underwater Station"	Johnny Florea	Lou Huston and Stanley H. Silverman	July 12, 1958
28	28	"The Lost Ones"	Johnny Florea	Stephen Kandel	July 19, 1958
29	29	"Capture of the Santa Rosa"	Johnny Florea	Lee Erwin	July 26, 1958
30	30	"The Shipwreck"	Leon Benson	Ellis Marcus	August 2, 1958
31	31	"The Big Dive"	Leon Benson	Ellis Marcus	August 9, 1958
32	32	"The Birthday Present"	Johnny Florea	Robert E. Smith	August 16, 1958
33	33	"Dead Man's Cove"	Johnny Florea	William Read Woodfield	August 23, 1958
34	34	"Explosion"	Leon Benson	Art Arthur	August 30, 1958
35	35	"The Amphibian"	Monroe Askins	Art Arthur	September 6, 1958
36	36	"Lord Cristobal"	Leon Benson	Arthur Weiss	September 13, 1958
37	37	"Decoy"	Leon Benson	Art Arthur	September 20, 1958
38	38	"The Sea Has Ears"	Leon Benson	Art Arthur	September 27, 1958
39	39	"The Manganese Story"	Leon Benson	Lee Erwin	October 4, 1958

=== Season 2 (1959) ===
No. overall	No. in season	Title	Directed by	Written by	Original release date
40	1	"The Alcatraz Story"	Herman Hoffman	William Read Woodfield	January 4, 1959
41	2	"Operation Greenback"	Leon Benson	Arthur Weiss	January 11, 1959
42	3	"Underwater Security"	Leon Benson	Art Arthur	January 18, 1959
43	4	"Underwater Labyrinth"	Leon Benson	Arthur Weiss	January 25, 1959
44	5	"Monte Cristo"	Leon Benson	Art Arthur	February 1, 1959
45	6	"The Stunt"	Johnny Florea	Stephen Kandel	February 8, 1959
46	7	"Diving for the Moon"	Leon Benson	Lee Erwin	February 15, 1959
47	8	"The Search"	Johnny Florea	Arthur Weiss	February 22, 1959
48	9	"Jettisoned"	Anton M. Leader	Stephen Kandel	March 1, 1959
49	10	"Murder at 60 Feet"	Leon Benson	Arthur Weiss	March 8, 1959
50	11	"Air Pockets"	Leon Benson	Lee Erwin	March 15, 1959
51	12	"The Dam"	Herman Hoffman	Herman Hoffman	March 22, 1959
52	13	"Dock Fire"	Leon Benson	Art Arthur	March 29, 1959
53	14	"The Persuaders"	Leon Benson	Art Arthur	April 5, 1959
54	15	"Nerve Gas"	Herman Hoffman	Art Arthur	April 12, 1959
55	16	"Strange Salvage"	Herman Hoffman	Art Arthur	April 19, 1959
56	17	"Underwater Survey"	Leon Benson	Stanley H. Silverman	April 26, 1959
57	18	"Underwater Curtain"	Leon Benson	Lee Erwin	May 3, 1959
58	19	"Hermes"	Leon Benson	Arthur Weiss	May 10, 1959
59	20	"The Briefcase"	Leon Benson	Arthur Weiss	May 17, 1959
60	21	"Cave Diving"	Herman Hoffman	Herman Hoffman	May 24, 1959
61	22	"Water Ski Show"	Herman Hoffman	Lee Erwin	July 1, 1959
62	23	"Underwater Shrine"	Leon Benson	Stanley H. Silverman	June 7, 1959
63	24	"Chain of Evidence"	Johnny Florea	Stanley H. Silverman	June 14, 1959
64	25	"Treasure Hunt"	Leon Benson	Stuart Jerome	June 21, 1959
65	26	"Sea Serpent"	Herman Hoffman	Lee Erwin	June 28, 1959
66	27	"The Getaway"	Leon Benson	Art Arthur	July 5, 1959
67	28	"Underwater Ejection"	Leon Benson	Arthur Weiss	July 12, 1959
68	29	"The Female"	Leon Benson	Art Arthur	July 19, 1959
69	30	"Port Security"	Leon Benson	Stanley H. Silverman	July 26, 1959
70	31	"Underwater Park"	Leon Benson	Art Arthur	August 2, 1959
71	32	"Underwater Unit"	Eddie Davis	Art Arthur	August 9, 1959
72	33	"Proof of Guilt"	Leon Benson	Stephen Kandel	August 16, 1959
73	34	"Chained"	Eddie Davis	Art Arthur	August 23, 1959
74	35	"Ransom"	Leon Benson	Art Arthur	August 30, 1959
75	36	"Oil Island"	Leon Benson	Art Arthur	September 6, 1959
76	37	"Base of Operations"	Leon Benson	Art Arthur	September 13, 1959
77	38	"Kelp Forest"	Leon Benson	Art Arthur	September 20, 1959
78	39	"The Raft"	Eddie Davis	Art Arthur	September 27, 1959

=== Season 3 (1960) ===
No. overall	No. in season	Title	Directed by	Written by	Original release date
79	1	"Asylum"	Leon Benson	Peter R. Brooke	January 9, 1960
80	2	"Water Nymphs"	Leon Benson	Art Arthur	January 16, 1960
81	3	"Mister Big"	Leon Benson	Art Arthur	January 23, 1960
82	4	"Hot Cargo"	Paul Guilfoyle	Stuart Jerome	January 30, 1960
83	5	"Unerwater Drop"	Leon Benson	Lee Berg	February 6, 1960
84	6	"Cobalt Bomb"	Paul Guilfoyle	Art Arthur	February 13, 1960
85	7	"Counterfeit"	Leon Benson	Stanley H. Silverman and Roger Marshall	February 20, 1960
86	8	"Missile Watch"	Leon Benson	Stephen Kandel	February 27, 1960
87	9	"Jade Cavern"	Herman Hoffman	Stephen Kandel	March 5, 1960
88	10	"Expatriate's Return"	Eddie Davis	Stanley H. Silverman	March 12, 1960
89	11	"Strong Box"	Leon Benson	Art Arthur	March 19, 1960
90	12	"The Fearmakers"	Leon Benson	Teddi Sherman	March 26, 1960
91	13	"Revolutionary Spoils"	Leon Benson	Art Arthur	April 2, 1960
92	14	"Pirate Gold"	Herman Hoffman	Teddi Sherman	April 9, 1960
93	15	"The Living Fossil"	Anton M. Leader	Stanley H. Silverman	April 16, 1960
94	16	"Submarine Explosion"	Anton M. Leader	Stephen Kandel	April 23, 1960
95	17	"Sacred Pool"	Leon Benson	Art Arthur	April 30, 1960
96	18	"Cindy"	David Friedkin	Sylvia Drake	May 7, 1960
97	19	"Cross Current"	Leon Benson	Stanley H. Silverman	May 14, 1960
98	20	"Synthetic Hero"	Leon Benson	Stephen Kandel	May 21, 1960
99	21	"The Cellini Vase"	Leon Benson	Stanley H. Silverman	May 28, 1960
100	22	"Target"	Leon Benson	Stanley H. Silverman	June 4, 1960
101	23	"Ghost Light"	Leon Benson	Teddi Sherman	June 11, 1960
102	24	"Rebreather"	Franklin Adreon	Stuart Jerome and James Buxbaum	June 18, 1960
103	25	"Blind Spot"	Leon Benson	Michael Cleary and Stephen Kandel	June 25, 1960
104	26	"The Replacement"	Leon Benson	Stanley H. Silverman and Robert Smith	July 2, 1960
105	27	"Underwater Beacon"	Franklin Adreon	Sylvia Drake	July 9, 1960
106	28	"Time Fuse"	Otto Lang	Joe Neilson	July 16, 1960
107	29	"Storm Drain"	Franklin Adreon	Alfred Callen and Robert Smith	July 23, 1960
108	30	"The Invader"	Jack Herzberg	Michael Cleary and Stephen Kandel	July 30, 1960
109	31	"Changing Patterns"	Franklin Adreon	Max Kiner and Teddi Sherman	August 6, 1960
110	32	"The Catalyst"	Leon Benson	Alfred Callen	August 13, 1960
111	33	"The Missing Link"	Jack Herzberg	Michael Cleary and Arthur Weiss	August 20, 1960
112	34	"Underwater Narcotics"	Leon Benson	Brad Fillmore	August 27, 1960
113	35	"The Sound of Nothing"	Leon Benson	Jay Stierwell	September 3, 1960
114	36	"Prima Donna"	Leon Benson	Alfred Callen and Peter R. Brooke	September 10, 1960
115	37	"Beyond Limits"	Leon Benson	Michael Cleary and Alan Berry	September 17, 1960
116	38	"Diplomatic Pouch"	Leon Benson	Michael Cleary	September 24, 1960
117	39	"Man Overboard"	Eddie Davis	Michael Cleary and Herman Hoffman	October 1, 1960

=== Season 4 (1961) ===
No. overall	No. in season	Title	Directed by	Written by	Original release date
118	1	"Point of No Return"	Leon Benson	William Barada	January 7, 1961
119	2	"River Treasure"	Leon Benson	Don Archer	January 14, 1961
120	3	"The Destroyers"	Leon Benson	Stephen Kandel	January 21, 1961
121	4	"Vital Error"	Leon Benson	Stanley H. Silverman and Richard P. McDonagh	January 28, 1961
122	5	"The Dancer"	Leon Benson	E. M. Parsons and Scott Flohr	February 4, 1961
123	6	"Sperling of Lamatsue"	Leon Benson	Sylvia Drake	February 11, 1961
124	7	"Rescue"	Monroe Askins	Jack Rock	February 18, 1961
125	8	"Mercy Trip"	Leon Benson	Barry Cohon and Harry S. Franklin	February 25, 1961
126	9	"Hot Tracer"	Monroe Askins	Don Moore	March 4, 1961
127	10	"Sonar Story"	Leon Benson	John McManus	March 11, 1961
128	11	"Amigo"	Leon Benson	Earl Barret and Ted Hartman	March 18, 1961
129	12	"The Aquanettes"	Leon Benson	Stephen Kandel	March 25, 1961
130	13	"Survival Kit"	Leon Benson	Don Archer	April 1, 1961
131	14	"Expedition"	Leon Benson	Mary C. McCall, Jr.	April 8, 1961
132	15	"Bionics"	Monroe Askins	Jack Kelsey	April 15, 1961
133	16	"The Defector"	Leon Benson	Richard P. McDonagh	April 22, 1961
134	17	"Niko"	Leon Benson	Don Archer	April 29, 1961
135	18	"Cougar"	Leon Benson	Stanley H. Silverman	May 6, 1961
136	19	"Sub Hatch"	Leon Benson	Don Moore	May 13, 1961
137	20	"The Octopus Story"	Leon Benson	William Barada	May 20, 1961
138	21	"Quicksand"	Leon Benson	Robert Smith	May 27, 1961
139	22	"Lost Island"	Leon Benson	E. M. Parsons	June 3, 1961
140	23	"Baby"	Leon Benson	Stanley H. Silverman	June 10, 1961
141	24	"Confidential Mission"	Franklin Adreon	Arthur Weiss	June 17, 1961
142	25	"Underwater Pirates"	Franklin Adreon	William Barada	June 24, 1961
143	26	"The Meet"	Eddie Davis	E. M. Parsons	July 1, 1961
144	27	"Dark Evil"	Leon Benson	Sloan Nibley and Stanley H. Silverman	July 8, 1961
145	28	"Sunken Car"	Franklin Adreon	Robert Smith	July 15, 1961
146	29	"Hit and Run"	Franklin Adreon	Art Arthur	July 22, 1961
147	30	"The Saint Story"	Leon Benson	Paul Franklin, Glenhall Taylor and Stanley H. Silverman	July 29, 1961
148	31	"Imposter"	Leon Benson	Stanley H. Silverman	August 5, 1961
149	32	"Superman"	Leon Benson	Frank Granville	August 12, 1961
150	33	"Roustabout"	Leon Benson	Don Archer	August 19, 1961
151	34	"P.T. Boat"	Richard Moder	Stanley H. Silverman	August 26, 1961
152	35	"Starting Signal"	Leon Benson	Stanley H. Silverman	September 2, 1961
153	36	"Skipper"	Richard Moder	Stanley H. Silverman	September 9, 1961
154	37	"Crime at Sea"	Leon Benson	Stanley H. Silverman	September 16, 1961
155	38	"Round Up"	Leon Benson	E. M. Parsons and Stanley H. Silverman	September 23, 1961

=== 1987 revival series ===
No.	Title	Directed by	Written by	Original release date	Prod. code
1	"Toxic Waste"	Felix Feist	Arthur Weiss	September 25, 1987	8203
2	"Murder at 60 Feet" "Rehearsal for Murder"	Ken Jubenvill	Arthur Weiss, Len Kaufman and Myles Wilder	October 2, 1987	55590
3	"Underwater Park"	Ken Jubenvill	Art Arthur and Fred Freiberger	October 9, 1987	8206
4	"Underwater Quake"	Alan Simmonds	Si Rose and Stephen Kandel	October 16, 1987	8213
5	"The Meeting"	Ken Jubenvill	Len Kaufman and Myles Wilder	October 23, 1987	8216
6	"Pearl Beds"	Alan Simmonds	Stephen Kandel and Fred Freiberger	October 30, 1987	8208
7	"The Big Blowup"	Brad Turner	Ed Turner	November 6, 1987	8218
8	"Treasure Hunt"	Michael Berry	Si Rose	November 13, 1987	8225
9	"The Torch Men"	Donald Shebib	Si Rose	November 20, 1987	8212
10	"Danger - Mines Ahead"	Richard Leiterman	Si Rose	November 28, 1987	8224
11	"Jennifer's Rescue"	Brad Turner	Stanley H. Silverman and Ed Turner	December 4, 1987	8207
12	"Girl in the Trunk"	Ken Jubenvill	Stuart Jerome and Jim Rogers	December 11, 1987	8202
13	"The Stunt"	Alan Simmonds	Stephen Kandel	December 18, 1987	8215
14	"Wet Diamonds"	Stan Olsen	Ellis Marcus and Si Rose	December 25, 1987	8211
15	"Amigo"	Michael Berry	Earl Barret, Ted Hartman, Les Kaufman and Myles Wilder	January 1, 1988	60534
16	"The Scavenger"	Alan Simmonds	Len Kaufman and Myles Wilder	January 8, 1988	8217
17	"The Siren"	Brad Turner	Lee Erwin and Si Rose	January 15, 1988	8201
18	"Ultrasonic Tag"	Brad Turner	Si Rose	January 22, 1988	8221
19	"The Witness"	Brad Turner	Jim Rogers	January 29, 1988	8220
20	"Sea Hunt's Been Stolen"	Donald Shebib	William Raynor	February 5, 1988	8222
21	"The Persuaders"	Stan Olsen	Art Arthur and Si Rose	February 12, 1988	55088
22	"The Phantom Strikes"	Donald Shebib	Si Rose	February 19, 1988	8223

Note: The episode numbering for the 1987 series was derived from the Epguides page for this series.

== Merchandising ==
Due to the show's popularity, Dell Comics released a series of Sea Hunt comic books. Series star Lloyd Bridges also endorsed swim equipment by Voit.

== Home media ==
TGG Direct released all four seasons on DVD in Region 1 on January 29, 2013.

== 50th anniversary ==
The Underwater Videographer Podcast presented a Sea Hunt 50th Anniversary podcast in December 2007. Appearing on the podcast were author Eric Hanauer, who interviewed Lloyd Bridges shortly before he died, actress Susan Silo, who guest starred in the "Cougar" episode, and Jeff Bridges, who shared memories of his father and Sea Hunt.

== See also ==
- Assignment: Underwater – American adventure television series from 1960 to 1961
