= Trolling tandem streamer fly =

A trolling tandem streamer fly is a style of fishing fly designed to be fished behind a moving boat.

Trolling is a form of fishing where the fisherman sits or stands in a moving boat and allows his lure or bait to swim in the water. The Trolling Tandem streamer fly is made of two or more hooks tied in tandem or one hook in front of another. Often the hook that is tied to the fishing line is a larger hook.
