= Ranger Boats =

Company producing fishing boats

Ranger Boats is a company that produces bass fishing boats designed primarily for black bass fishing. The company was founded in 1968 by Forrest L. Wood in Flippin, Arkansas. Ranger is generally credited with the introduction of the modern bass boat. They make boats for commercial and recreational use. Ranger Boats has both fiberglass boats and aluminum boats.

Ranger is a major sponsor of the Fishing League Worldwide.

Ranger Boats and all of the brands under Fishing Holdings LLS were acquired by Bass Pro Group in a deal signed in December 2014. The deal included Bass Pro acquiring the Ranger, Triton Boats, and the Stratos Boats brands. Several bass boat companies are manufactured in the same facility, but are sold separately as individual brands by dealerships.

== History ==
Forrest and Nina Wood established Ranger Boats in 1968 in Flippin, Arkansas, with just six boats constructed in the present-day city hall. The business, which is renowned for its quality and ingenuity, swiftly rose to become a national leader in fishing boats.

Ranger invented the aerated livewell, which helped make catch-and-release fishing more popular, and the use of additional floatation for safety, among other industry norms. With the Fisherman Series, it entered the walleye, salmon, and musky fishing boat market in the 1970s. Later, it introduced high-end saltwater models.

As it celebrated its 50th anniversary in 2018, Ranger had established itself as a reliable brand in a variety of boat classes, from pontoons and saltwater vessels to bass and multi-species boats.
