= Edward vom Hofe =

Edward vom Hofe (1846–1920) was a New York fishing equipment entrepreneur of the late 19th century. He introduced his first two fly reels, starting his own business in 1867. Vom Hofe had become famous for his precision salt-water big-game bait and casting reels constructed of nickel silver and hard rubber (ebonite), along with recently discovered metal named aluminum. Vom Hofe was a machinist, fishing-tackle builder and noted big-game angler who outfitted the famous anglers of his generation.

The handmade fly reels, both named "The Edward vom Hofe Celebrated Trout and Bass Fly Reel", are still generally considered by anglers and collectors around the world as among the very best fly reels ever made. The salmon-size versions of these reels followed soon afterwards.

The first of these trout reels, the #355, a reel with a two-tone clicker mechanism system, that can be activated as additional drag force, with a patent date of 1883, was joined around 1896 by the model #360, equipped with an "adjustable, automatic silent tension drag" system. To distinguish the two different models, later versions of the #355 were designated as the "Peerless" and #360 became the "Perfection." Only 2 direct successors of vom Hofe (Otto Zwarg and the Walker workshop) used the vom Hofe drag system in salmon reels, but not in trout reels. Joe Jancurias of Rochester, NY was the first maker, who made new Edward vom Hofe flyreels. For the 150th anniversary of the Orvis fishing tackle company, he made a limited set of "Perfection" models. Joe Jancurias died in 2011. There were former attempts preceding the Orvis Anniversary edition made by Joe Jancurias, but those failed in achieving the respected and acknowledged esthetics, for example in using the same size screws for 2 different sizes of reels for matters of economy. The size of the drag adjusting wheel was also out of proportion for the smaller size since the same diameter was used for both sizes, for economic reasons. Also the geometry of the handle had not been reproduced accordingly following the original vom Hofe formula and so leaving these attempts easily recognizable and discernible. In 2005, Edward vom Hofe was posthumously inducted into the International Game Fish Association Hall of Fame.
