= Trolling motor =

Boat propeller used to reduce drag

A trolling motor is a self-contained marine propulsion unit that includes an electric motor, propeller and control system, and is affixed to an angler's boat, either at the bow or stern. A gasoline-powered outboard used in trolling, if it is not the vessel's primary source of propulsion, may also be referred to as a trolling motor. The main function of trolling motors was once to keep the boat running at a consistent, low speed suitable for trolling, but that function has been augmented by GPS-tracking trolling motors that function as "virtual anchors" to automatically maintain a boat's position relative to a desired location, such as a favorite fishing spot. Trolling motors are often lifted from the water to reduce drag when the boat's primary engine is in operation.

== Uses ==
- Trolling for game fish; a motor used for this purpose is usually a secondary means of propulsion, and mounted on the transom alongside the primary outboard motor or on a bracket made for the purpose.
- Auxiliary power for precision maneuvering of the boat, to enable the angler to cast his bait to where the fish are located. Trolling motors designed for this application are typically mounted in the bow.

== History ==
An 1895 article in Scientific American entitled "A Portable Electric Propeller for Boats" stated: "Briefly described, it consists of a movable tube which is hinged at the stern of the boat, much as an oar is used in sculling. The tube contains a flexible shaft formed of three coils of phosphor bronze. This tube extends down and out into the water, where it carries a propeller, and at the inboard end an electric Motor is attached, which is itself driven by batteries." It was invented and sold by the Electric Boat company.

The electric trolling motor was invented by O.G. Schmidt in 1934 in Fargo, North Dakota, when he took a starter motor from a Ford Model A, added a flexible shaft, and a propeller. Because his manufacturing company was near the Minnesota/North Dakota border, he decided to call the new company Minn Kota. The company still is a major manufacturer of trolling motors.

== Design ==
=== Electric trolling motors ===
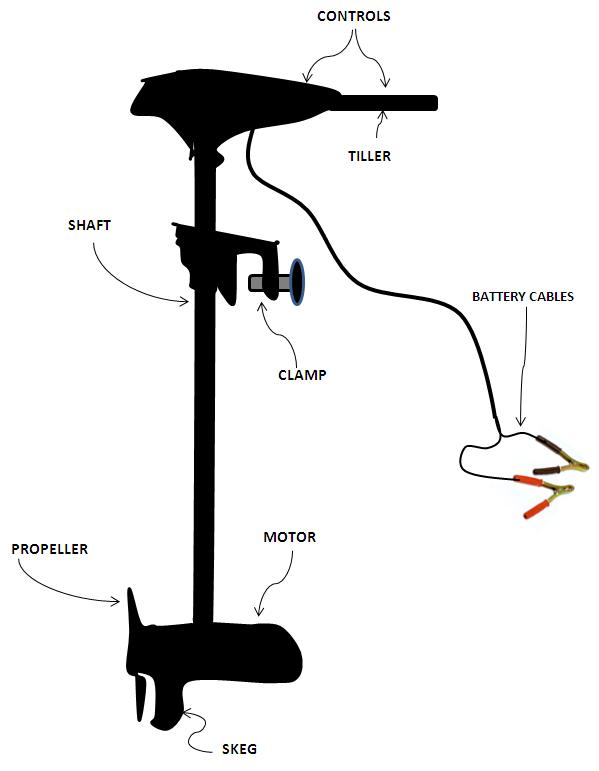
Diagram of a hand-controlled trolling motor

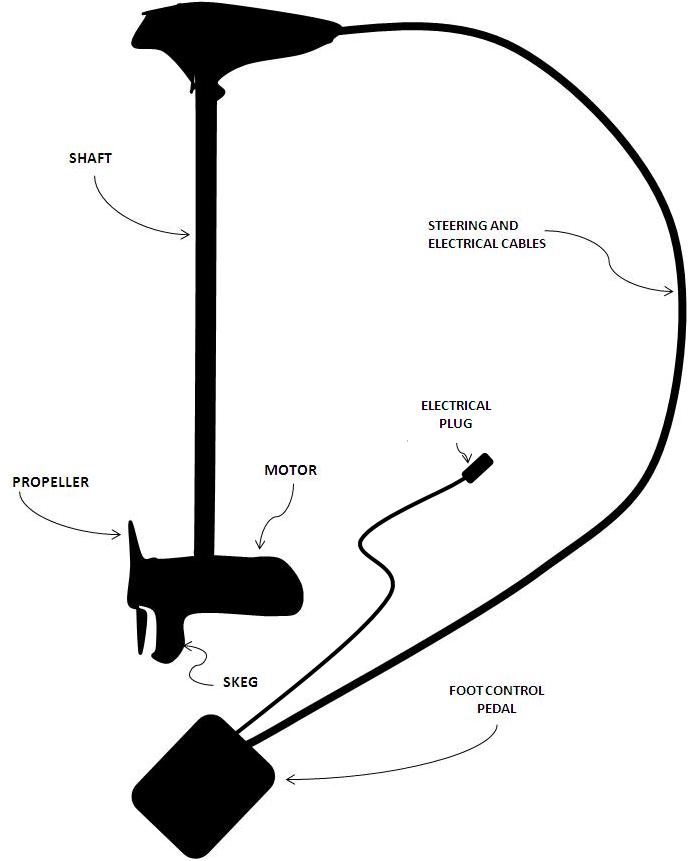
Diagram of a foot-controlled trolling motor

- Modern electric trolling motors are designed around a 12-volt, 24-volt or 36-volt brushed DC electric motor, to take advantage of the availability of 12-volt deep cycle batteries designed specifically for marine use.
- The motor itself is sealed inside a watertight compartment at the end of the shaft. It is submerged during operation, which prevents overheating.
- The propeller is fitted directly on to the propshaft.
- Hand-control: tiller for steering, with speed control either built into the tiller or a control knob on top of the unit. Hand controlled trolling motors are attached to the boat with a clamp.
- Foot-control: on/off and speed controls are foot-operated, and built into a pedal that also controls the steering mechanism. Steering may be via electronically controlled servo motors, or in early-model (and late-model low-end units), a push-pull cable. Foot controlled trolling motors require a specialized mounting bracket that bolts horizontally to the deck. Main advantage of foot controls is that fisherman has both hands free for fishing and landing the hooked fish. On the other hand, it is sometimes hard to coordinate foot work with hands, especially in wavy and windy conditions.
- Wireless remote: available on high-end late-model trolling motors. Servo-controlled steering and speed control both respond to a wireless device, either in a foot pedal or a key-fob transmitter (similar to an automotive remote keyless system).

=== Gasoline-powered trolling motors ===
- Small outboard motors are frequently used as trolling motors on boats with much larger engines that do not operate as efficiently or quietly at trolling speeds. These typically are designed with a manual pull start system, throttle and gearshift controls mounted on the body of the motor, and a tiller for steering, but in a trolling application, will be connected to the steering mechanism at the helm.

== See also ==
- Electric boat
- Electric outboard motor
- Outboard motor
- Trolling
