= Stratos Boats =

Boat manufacturer of USA

Stratos Boats, Inc. is a manufacturer of fishing boats and is located in Flippin, Arkansas. Formerly owned by Platinum Equity, which also owned Triton and Ranger Boats as Fishing Holdings LLS, Stratos was acquired by Bass Pro Group in December 2014. They produce a line of fiberglass boats, primarily for the U.S. bass and panfishing markets. Most of their boats are 16 ft. to 21 ft. in length.

Stratos began building boats in 1984, and sells throughout a network of dealers throughout the United States, Australia, France, Japan, Mexico, Portugal, Romania, Russia, South Africa, Spain, Italy and Venezuela.

Stratos is partnered with high-profile professional anglers such as Skeet Reese, Larry Nixon, Shawn Battersby and Mike McClelland to help promote enthusiasm, excitement and overall benefits of time spent on the water.

From the Stratos web site: "After more than 30 years in the market and several changes in ownership, production of new Stratos boats has been halted as White River Marine Group focuses its resources on a consolidated group of high-demand performance fishing boat brands. White River Marine Group stands behind Stratos boats in operation with warranty, parts and service support."
