= Carver Yachts =

American yacht builder

Carver was a yacht builder located in Pulaski, Wisconsin, United States. Their models ranged from 18 feet to 57 feet.

== History ==
Carver Yachts was founded in 1954 in Milwaukee, Wisconsin, when Charles "Charlie" Carter and George Verhagen started building mahogany runabouts in a factory on South 27th. The popular myth that they started building boats in the backyard garage is not true. They were both long time marine industry people that decided to build boats rather than sell them through Carter's two marine dealerships in Green Bay and the Fox Valley. The pair later sold the business in 1963 to business partners Walter "Wally" Markham and Glen Nordin, both of whom had worked for Cruisers Yachts of Oconto, Wisconsin. Under their leadership the then-called Carver Boat Corporation transitioned to fiberglass based construction and expanded from a regional boat builder to an international company with worldwide sales.

In 2004 Carver started the Marquis Yachts line, which began with the 59 and 65 Motor Yachts. Over 100 of the 65 Motor Yachts were built from 2005 to 2008 in Pulaski, Wisconsin.

Carver was acquired by Marquis-Larson boat group. Carver Yachts permanently closed July 30, 2021.
