= List of American fishers =

This is a list of American fishers, denoting fishers who have been involved in various aspects of fishing, commercial fishing and recreational fishing.

== American fishers ==
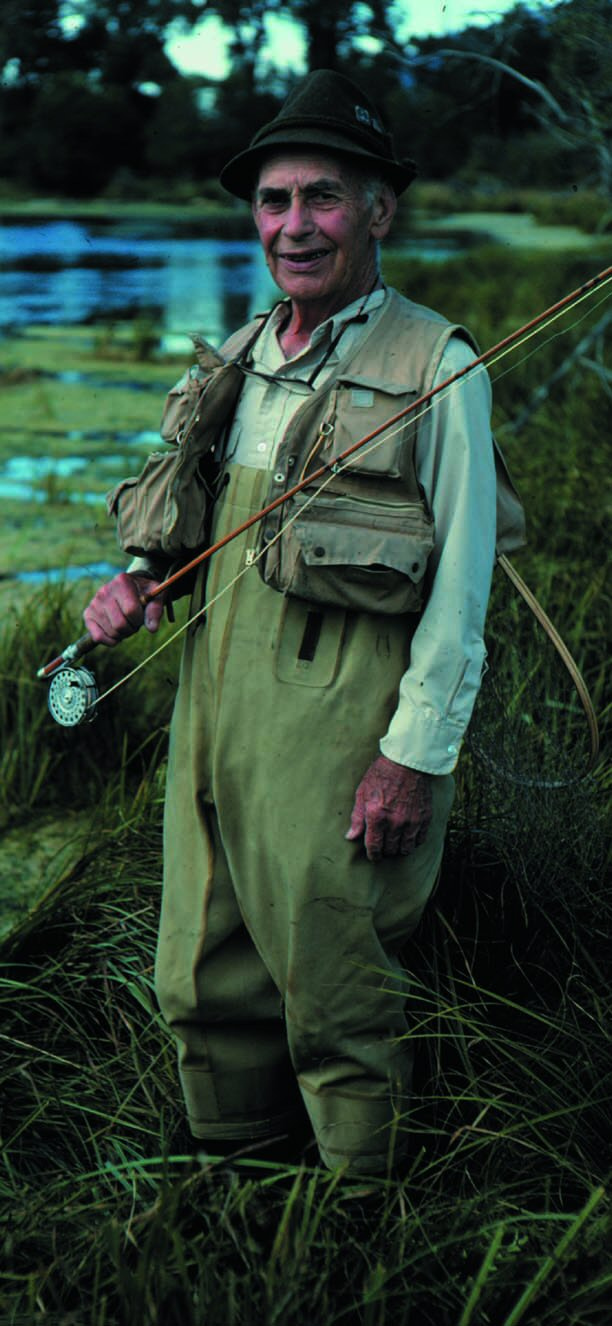
Dan Bailey

- Ted Ames – a Maine fisherman, and former hatchery director of Penobscot East Resource Center
- Alan Austerman
- Michael de Avila
- Dan Bailey
- Carrie G. Stevens
- Dianna Clark
- Luke Clausen
- Rick Clunn – a professional bass fisherman from La Porte, Texas who currently resides in Ava, Missouri
- Bill Dance (television host)
- George M. Daniel
- Mark Davis (fisherman)
- James Deren
- E.W. Edwards
- Kim Elton
- Harold Ensley
- S. Kip Farrington
- Everett Garrison
- Red Fisher (sportsman)
- Gadabout Gaddis
- Jack Gartside
- Alfred C. Glassell Jr.
- George F. Grant
- Todd Graves (entrepreneur)
- Linda Greenlaw
- Zane Grey
- Tom Hanlon (politician)
- Ernest Hemingway
- Jack Hemingway

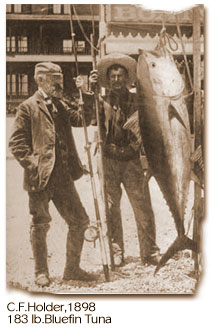
Charles Frederick Holder with his then record 183 pounds (83 kg) bluefin tuna catch, 1898.

- Charles Frederick Holder
- Jimmy Houston
- Michael Iaconelli
- Ben Johnson (Makah politician)
- Larry Larsen
- James Larsin
- Loren Leman
- H.L. Leonard
- Paul H. Young
- Al Lindner
- Ron Lindner
- Pete Maina
- Scott McAdams
- Peter Miller (Host)
- Charisse Millett
- Joseph Monninger
- Frank Mundus
- Richard Murphy (Captain)
- Larry Nixon
- Riki Ott
- Cliff Pace
- Sarah Palin
- Todd Palin
- Hank Parker – a professional bass fisherman in the United States
- Hank Parker Jr.
- George Poveromo
- Skeet Reese
- Louis Rhead
- Tom Rosenbauer
- Jim Saric
- Bill Schaadt
- Ray Scott (angler)
- Paul Seaton
- William Shakespeare (inventor)
- Ben Stevens
- Ron P. Swegman
- Gerald Swindle
- Bill Thomas (Alaska politician)
- Kevin VanDam
- Edward vom Hofe
- Lowell Wakefield
- Dean Ween
- O'Neill Williams
- Ted Williams
- Babe Winkelman
- Forrest L. Wood
- Joan Wulff
- Ed Zern
