= Roland Martin (fisherman) =

American fisherman and television personality

Roland Martin (born March 14, 1940) is a professional sport fisherman. Martin is host of Fishing with Roland Martin on the NBCSN television channel.

Fishing in 291 tournaments, Martin's BASSMASTER career includes the following achievements – 19 tournaments won, 9 B.A.S.S. Angler-of-the-Year titles, nearly 100 Top Ten finishes, and 25 appearances in bass fishing's world championship event, the Bassmaster Classic. Also a record, he has 19 second place BASS finishes. His career tournament winnings exceeded one million dollars in 2004.

Roland Martin was the first professional bass fisherman to be inducted into all three Halls of Fame (IGFA Hall of Fame, Freshwater Fishing Hall of Fame, Professional Bass Fishing Hall of Fame).

In a July 2005 survey for the "Greatest Angler", Roland Martin was voted second (to Rick Clunn), hurt by his lack of a Classic championship.

He is also good friends with fellow fishermen Bill Dance and Jimmy Houston, with the two appearing on his show multiple times. With them, he formed the company Th3 Legends to sell signature products.

He popularized the concept of "pattern" fishing: determining a particular way to catch fish for a given time and lake, and then applying it to similar locations around that lake. He has been a spokesman for bass fishing, conservation, and the pursuit of the American dream for decades, generating a large following of fans.
