= Pintlala, Alabama =

- Unincorporated community
- Location within Alabama Location within the United States
- Coordinates: 32°10′33″N 86°22′03″W
- Country: United States
- State: Alabama
- County: Montgomery
- Elevation: 253 ft (77 m)
- Time zone: UTC-6 (Central (CST))
  - Summer (DST): UTC-5 (CDT)
- Area code: 334
- GNIS feature ID: 124905

Pintlala, also known as Pint Lala or Colquitt, is an unincorporated community in Montgomery County, Alabama, United States, located on U.S. Route 31, 15.6 miles (25.1 km) south of Montgomery.

== History ==
Pintlala, and nearby Pintlala Creek, are named for the Creek words, pithlo, meaning "canoe", and the verb form of halatas, meaning "to drag". Pintlala was founded as an Upper Creek town, situated around Sam Moniac's tavern on the Old Federal Road. 50 to 60 houses were burned here by American forces during the Creek War. Sam Moniac was the brother in law of William Weatherford and the father of David Moniac. General James Wilkinson and Benjamin Hawkins both stopped at Moniac's tavern while traveling on the Federal Road. Soon after Wilkinson stopped there, Moniac's tavern and home were burned down by members of the Red Sticks.

Pintlala School was founded in 1923, due to the consolidation of schools located in smaller communities such as Hope Hull, Le Grand, and Snowdoun. The last meeting of the Alabama Chapter of The National Grange of the Order of Patrons of Husbandry met at Grange Hall in Pintlala in July 1891.

A post office operated under the name Pint Lala from 1827 to 1883, and under the name Colquitt from 1900 to 1904.

Three properties in Pintlala, Bethel Cemetery, Pintlala School, and Tabernacle Methodist Church, are listed on the Alabama Register of Landmarks and Heritage.

== Education ==
Montgomery Public Schools operates Pintlala Elementary School. The school opened in 1922.

== Notable person ==
- Ray Scott, founder of Bass Anglers Sportsman Society. Former Presidents George H. W. Bush and George W. Bush, as well as Bill Dance and Chuck Yeager have fished at his private lake in Pintlala.
