= Michael Iaconelli =

American fisherman (born 1972)

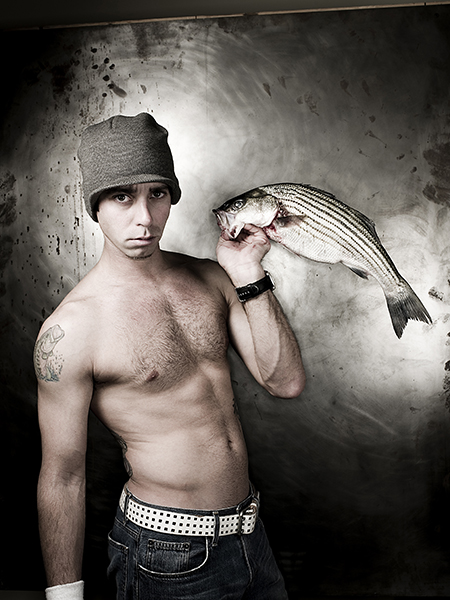
- Michael Iaconelli in 2006
- Born: June 17, 1972 (age 54); Runnemede, New Jersey
- Occupations: Professional bass fisherman, television personality
- Spouse: Rebecca Iaconelli
- Children: 4

Michael Iaconelli, also known as Mike and by his nickname "Ike", (born June 17, 1972 in Runnemede, New Jersey) is a professional bass fisherman, television personality, and podcast show host from Pittsgrove Township, New Jersey. Iaconelli competes on Major League Fishing. As of February 11, 2019, Mike's career tournament winnings with B.A.S.S. were $2,500,205, which includes 7 wins. Iaconelli's major accomplishments include the longest active streak of Bassmaster Classic qualifications with 17 consecutive appearances, the 2017 Major League Fishing Summit Cup Champion, 2003 Bassmaster Classic champion, as well as the 2006 Toyota Tundra Angler of the Year. Iaconelli is the only angler to have won the Bassmaster Classic, Bassmaster Angler of the Year and B.A.S.S. Nation Championship.

== Early life and education ==
Iaconelli was born in South Philadelphia, Pennsylvania. He grew up living with his mother, his uncle and his grandparents. At a young age, Iaconelli was introduced to fishing on summer trips to the Pocono Mountains. On these trips, he was first introduced to other types of fishing besides bass fishing. His first experiences were with trout and various panfish species. His first largemouth bass catch came at age twelve during his family's annual summer trek to the Pocono Mountains. Iaconelli used a 9S Floating Rapala lure to catch the bass. According to Iaconelli, this moment sparked his interest in bass fishing. His love for bass fishing continued on into high school.

Raised in Runnemede, New Jersey, Iaconelli attended Triton Regional High School.

== Career ==
=== Early career ===
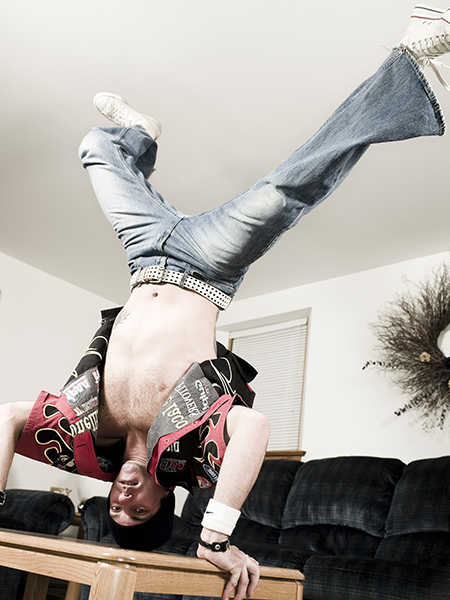
Michael Iaconelli in 2006

After high school, Iaconelli founded the bass fishing club, "Top Rod Bassmasters". Top Rod Bassmasters became Iaconelli's first venture into competitive bass fishing. The club had inter-club tournaments among its members. In 1992, after three years of fishing in Top Rod Bassmasters, Iaconelli made the transition to the pro-am circuit. His first tournament on this circuit was the North Carolina Top 100. This event was held on Lake Norman in Mecklenburg County, North Carolina. In this tournament, Iaconelli drew widely known fisherman, Tommy Biffle. In the following days of the North Carolina Top 100, he would also draw well-known fishermen David Fritts and Gary Klein. In 1994, Iaconelli once again fished the North Carolina Top 100 on Lake Norman. At this tournament, he won his first bass boat. The boat he won was a new Ranger 374.

After Iaconelli won a Ranger 374, he began to tackle the Red Man and Bass Anglers Sportsman Society (B.A.S.S.) Federation trails. In 1997, Iaconelli fished a B.A.S.S. Invitational Tournament on Buggs Island, also known as Kerr Lake. The first day, he was paired with the four-time Bassmaster Classic champion, Kevin VanDam. One of Iaconelli's earliest tournament victories came on New Jersey's Lake Hopatcong. In this Federation tournament, he broke the lake and one-day Federation record of just over 18 pounds. His official weight for that tournament was 19.58 lbs.

In 1999, Iaconelli qualified for the Bassmaster Federation Nationals on the Red River. He would go on to win the event as he qualified for the 1999 Bassmaster Classic berth after the victory. The 1999 Bassmaster Classic was held on the Louisiana Delta in New Orleans, Louisiana. At the 1999 Bassmaster Classic, Classic rookie Iaconelli caught a three-day total of 39 lbs and 12 oz. That total netted him a sixth-place finish. The great finish at the Bassmaster Classic culminated in Dick's Sporting Goods and Daiwa becoming major sponsors for Iaconelli. In September of the same year, Iaconelli collected his first victory in the professional ranks by winning the Bassmaster Vermont Top 150 on Lake Champlain. Michael Iaconelli bagged over 61 lbs of bass and a $100,000 check. In 2000, Iaconelli made the leap to the professional ranks. He began fishing the B.A.S.S Tour. Again, Iaconelli qualified for the Bassmaster Classic. The 2000 Bassmaster Classic was held on Lake Michigan in Chicago, Illinois. He was able to net a top finish with a three-day weight total of 20 lbs 1 oz.

In 2002, Iaconelli started the season with a victory on Lake Seminole. The victory on Lake Seminole was the first Tour level victory for Iaconelli. He qualified for the 2003 Bassmaster Classic after a ninth-place victory at the B.A.S.S. Invitational on Lake Ontario.

=== 2003 to present ===
During practice, Iaconelli traveled down to the Venice, Louisiana pool where he found the backwater pond nicknamed "the Heart". This location was the area Iaconelli fished in during the 2003 Bassmaster Classic. On Day One of the Bassmaster Classic, Iaconelli caught over 15 lbs. This weight put Iaconelli in second-place after Day One just over a pound behind Day One leader Mark Menendez. On Day Two of the Bassmaster Classic, Iaconelli vaulted into first-place with a five bass limit weighing 11 lbs and 14 oz. On Day Three, Iaconelli weighed in 10 lbs 14 oz to win his first Bassmaster Classic. His three-day total was 37 lbs and 14 oz. Iaconelli's Bassmaster Classic winning fish was captured on camera. Iaconelli's winning catch has been replayed on ESPN Classic. That notable moment featured Iaconelli capturing the winning fish. After he landed the bass, Iaconelli exclaimed, "Never give up! Never give up, man!" Iaconelli was also awarded a $200,000 purse for his Bassmaster Classic victory.

After winning the Bassmaster Classic, Iaconelli continued fishing professionally. He recorded a fourth-place finish on the Harris Chain of Lakes in Leesburg, Florida in his first Bassmaster Tour event since his Bassmaster Classic victory on the Louisiana Delta. This top-five finish on the Harris Chain of Lakes was the first of three top-ten finishes for Iaconelli. At the third Bassmaster Tour event on Lake Guntersville, he recorded a fifth-place finish. His third top-ten finish of the 2004 season occurred at Smith Mountain Lake. At Smith Mountain Lake, Iaconelli recorded an eighth-place victory. Iaconelli qualified for the 2004 Bassmaster Classic on Lake Wylie. However, Iaconelli was not able to repeat as Bassmaster Classic champion. He finished 19th with a three-day total weight of 20 lbs and 13 oz.

In 2005, Iaconelli recorded five top-ten finishes on the Bassmaster and Elite 50 Tours. The 2005 Bassmaster Classic was held on the Allegheny River, Monongahela River and Ohio River. There, he recorded a fifth-place finish. He finished a pound and ten ounces behind the 2005 Bassmaster Classic champion, Kevin Vandam.

Iaconelli started off the 2006 season with a career-low 51st-place finish at the Bassmaster Classic on Lake Tohopekaliga. For the remainder of the 2006 season, he recorded top-twenty finishes in seven of the eight Elite Series events. One of his top-twenty finishes of the 2006 season included a victory at the Bassmaster Elite Series Southern Challenge on Lake Guntersville. Iaconelli would go on to win the 2006 Toyota Tundra Angler of the Year award. Also in 2006, Iaconelli was named one of the 10 most hated athletes by GQ magazine.

At the 2006 Bassmaster Classic, Iaconelli's boat had aerator issues in its livewells. The aerator issues resulted in his two fish dying. As a result, Iaconelli, out of frustration, broke the light pole on his bass boat. This resulted in his Day Two disqualification from the 2006 Bassmaster Classic.

In 2007, Iaconelli was not able to repeat as the Toyota Tundra Angler of the Year. He only recorded one top-ten finish throughout the entire 2007 season.

The 2008 season began with a tenth-place finish on Lake Hartwell. Iaconelli did not record another top ten finish until the Bassmaster Elite Series Tennessee Triumph on Old Hickory Lake. There he finished in ninth place. From there, he went on to finish fifth and third at the Bassmaster Elite Series Empire Chase and the Bassmaster Elite Series Empire Chase respectively. Toyota, Yamaha Motor Company, Berkley (fishing), Abu Garcia, Bass Cat Boats, Rapala, VMC, Tackle Warehouse, Renegade Eye Gear, Molix, Hobie Fishing, Flambeau Outdoors, Lowrance Electronics, Power-Pole, Missile Jigs, RAM Mounts, and Reelsnot

Iaconelli started the 2009 season by finishing second at the 2009 Bassmaster Classic on the Red River. He was the runner-up to Skeet Reese by 11 ounces. Iaconelli would start the 2009 Elite Series season with top-ten finishes at Lake Amistad and Wheeler Lake. In August 2009, Iaconelli again finished runner-up in a championship tournament. At the Forrest L. Wood (FLW) Cup, he finished second to Greg Hackney by 3 ounces.

Iaconelli's 2010 season began at the Bassmaster Classic on Lay Lake in Birmingham, Alabama. He posted a sixth-place finish with 37 pounds 6 ounces (17.0 kg). Iaconelli's other lone top ten finish of the season came on the California Delta.

At the 2011 Bassmaster Classic held on the Louisiana Delta, Iaconelli posted an eleventh-place finish. Following the Elite Series tournament on Lake Guntersville (Al.), Iaconelli had surgery at the Huntsville Orthopaedic Clinic to remove blood pooling in his right calf. Iaconelli finished 12th in the Guntersville event despite fishing the entire tournament with the injured leg. Iaconelli said he believes the injury occurred during the Sabine River tournament the previous week while he was changing a prop.

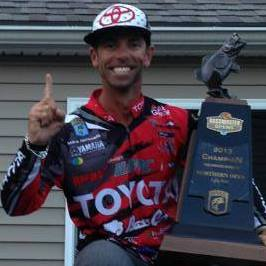

Mike won the 2014 Bassmaster Elites at Delaware River, on his home water near Philadelphia.

Iaconelli co-founded The Bass University with fellow professional bass angler Peter Gluszek in 2009. The Bass University is a bass fishing education organization specializing in bass fishing seminars, online training, and on-water education.

== Television and media ==
=== Going Ike ===
Originally created as a YouTube video series by Iaconelli in 2010, Going Ike became a television series in 2017 on the Pursuit Channel. Going Ike includes footage captured while filming at fishing destinations. Unlike traditional fishing show, Iaconelli features new, game-changing fishing tactics, difficult challenges, and moments of catching trophy fish.

=== IKE LIVE! ===
Iaconelli hosts 'IKE LIVE!', a fishing talk show that includes the top professional anglers in bass fishing, pro athletes & other fishing enthusiasts as special guests. On this show, Iaconelli simultaneously records his in-studio podcast & web series. Watch Ike Live

=== City Limits Fishing ===
City Limits Fishing follows Iaconelli to various big cities like Detroit, Los Angeles, Philadelphia, Washington, D.C. and Seattle. The premise of the show is to catch a limit of fish, in a limited amount of time, within the city limits.

== Television appearances ==
=== truTV ===
Greatest Sports Ever, Season 1 Episode 3. Mike is featured for his celebrations after catching a fish.

=== Comedy Central ===
The Daily Show: Ed Helms takes a look at Mike Iaconelli, a renegade bad boy in the world of bass fishing. Watch The Daily Show with Jon Stewart's 'Fishing for Attention' n

== Career Tournament Stats and Additional Bio Information ==
-Bassmaster: http://www.bassmaster.com/anglers/michael-iaconelli

-Major League Fishing: https://www.majorleaguefishing.com/angler-detail/mike-iaconelli/5388

-Fishing League Worldwide (FLW): https://web.archive.org/web/20120305061103/http://www.flwoutdoors.com/community/profile/home.cfm?uid=102108

https://www.bassfishinghof.com/inductee/mike-iaconelli

== Charity ==
Iaconelli founded The Ike Foundation in July 2014. The main goal is getting more kids involved with the sport of fishing. The Ike Foundation donates fishing tackle to kids and youth organizations, hosts kids fishing and fundraiser events, and assists other charitable organizations including civic organizations and existing youth fishing organizations.

== Personal life ==
Mike is married to Rebecca "Becky" Iaconelli and he has four children: Drew, Rylie, Vegas, and Estella. Mike and Becky renew their wedding vows each year with themed or destination wedding ceremonies such as a pirate wedding with a Captain Jack Sparrow officiant in 2010.

Mike has also been designated by several pro tours as an ambassador to those not part of a community.
