= Major League Fishing =

Professional bass fishing league and television show

Major League Fishing (MLF) is a professional bass fishing league and sports television show that airs on Outdoor Channel, World Fishing Network and Discovery Channel. The league's headquarters are located in Tulsa, Oklahoma.

The MLF was established in partnership between the Professional Bass Tour Anglers' Association (PBTAA) and Outdoor Channel as an answer to other professional fishing tournaments that the anglers compete in. It was the top-rated show on Outdoor Channel.

Major League Fishing is different from other professional fishing tournaments in that every bass boat has a referee on board to weigh each catch immediately and ensure quick catch and release, and all fisherman have a constant update on how fellow competitors are performing through iPads on their boats. Additionally, anglers do not know where they are going before the day of the competition, as it focuses more on the anglers's personalities and struggles under competition pressure rather than purely on yields and rankings. This new style of tournament fishing was designed with conservation in mind, and anglers are not allowed to land fish, grab them for long, or keeping them in the boat's live well. The shows are fished without revealing results instantly, as the results are shown when the television program airs.

== History ==
In 2010, the anglers of the PBTAA met with the Outdoor Channel to outline the first Major League Fishing competition—the 2012 Challenge Cup was filmed at Amistad Reservoir, Texas, in 2011 and aired on the Outdoor Channel in 2012. Professional Anglers Boyd Duckett and Gary Klein represent the anglers and originally came up with the idea of Major League Fishing. Major League Fishing is sponsored by a number of fishing-related companies and external organizations including Bass Pro Shops, General Tire, Lowrance, SIG Sauer and Geico. Many other fishing clubs around the country now use the MLF format for their tournaments, including the Brecknell digital scales used in competition and the SCORETRACKER LIVE! scoring system, as MLF continues to grow. In 2019 MLF purchased Fishing League Worldwide (FLW) one of the prominent national bass fishing tours. They have maintained most of the FLW tournaments however the FLW Tour was discontinued and anglers given priority entry to the new MLF Invitationals, the qualifying series for the MLF Bass Pro Tour.

== Anglers ==
Professional anglers who currently compete in Major League Fishing are B.A.S.S. or Fishing League Worldwide current or retired pros, including Edwin Evers, Kevin VanDam, Mike Iaconelli, Skeet Reese, Casey Ashley, Ott DeFoe and Gabriel Kilgore .

== Events ==
Major League Fishing has two independent competitions, the Selects and Cups, which are each fished by a different set of anglers. The Cup anglers also compete for a chance to fish the MLF World Championship, which airs on CBS. MLF Cup events feature 3 days of competitions between 10 anglers, with the top 4 advancing from each day of competition into a Sudden Death Round. In the Sudden Death Rounds, the first 3 anglers to hit a designated "cut weight" receive a spot in the Championship Round, which is winner-take-all.

Cup Champions

- 2012 Challenge Cup - Brent Ehrler
- 2013 Summit Cup - Denny Brauer
- 2013 Challenge Cup - Edwin Evers
- 2014 Summit Cup - Kevin VanDam
- 2014 Challenge Cup - Kelly Jordon
- 2015 Summit Cup - Scott Suggs
- 2015 Challenge Cup - Edwin Evers
- 2016 Summit Cup - Kevin VanDam
- 2016 Challenge Cup - Bobby Lane
- 2017 Summit Cup - Mike Iaconelli
- 2017 Challenge Cup - Jacob Wheeler
- 2018 Summit Cup - Skeet Reese
- 2018 Challenge Cup - Kevin VanDam
- 2019 Summit Cup - Mike Iaconelli
- 2019 Challenge Cup - Jacob Wheeler
- 2020 Heritage Cup - Jacob Powroznik
- 2020 Patriot Cup - Mark Rose
- 2020 Summit Cup - Takahiro Omori
- 2020 Challenge Cup - Jeff Sprague
- 2021 Heritage Cup - Ott DeFoe
- 2021 Patriot Cup - Takahiro Omori
- 2021 Summit Cup - Marty Robinson
- 2021 Challenge Cup - Edwin Evers
- 2022 Heritage Cup - Andy Montgomery
- 2022 Patriot Cup - Stephen Browning
- 2022 Summit Cup - Jacob Wheeler
- 2022 Challenge Cup - Brent Ehrler
- 2024 Heritage Cup - Ott DeFoe/Andy Montgomery
- 2024 Patriot Cup - Jeff Sprague/Bryan Thrift
- 2024 Summit Cup - Drew Gill/Marshall Robinson
- 2024 Challenge Cup - Matt Becker/Spencer Shuffield

World Champions/REDCREST

- 2017 World Championship - Bobby Lane
- 2018 World Championship - Greg Hackney
- 2019 World Championship - Jacob Wheeler
- 2019 REDCREST - Edwin Evers
- 2020 World Championship - Jordan Lee
- 2020 REDCREST - Bobby Lane
- 2021 REDCREST - Dustin Connell
- 2022 REDCREST - Bobby Lane
- 2023 REDCREST - Bryan Thrift
- 2024 REDCREST - Dustin Connell

Bass Pro Tour Heavy Hitters

- 2020 Heavy Hitters - Jordan Lee
- 2021 Heavy Hitters - Alton Jones
- 2022 Heavy Hitters - Ott DeFoe
- 2023 Heavy Hitters - Alton Jones, Jr
- 2024 Heavy Hitters - Jordan Lee
