= Al Lindner =

American fisher and broadcaster

Al Lindner (born 1944 in Chicago, IL) is a sportsman, television and radio personality, and fishing industry innovator who has invented, along with his older brother Ron Lindner, many fishing lures and rigs including the Lindy Rig which has been used by tens of millions of anglers to catch walleye since it first hit the market in 1968. The Lindners estimate that more than 70 million Lindy Rigs - and, as he put it, "its many imitators" - have been sold.

Lindner also co-owns the Baxter, MN based Lindner Media Productions, along with Ron and sons James, Daniel and Bill, which specializes in producing educational fishing programs (such as "Angling Edge" and "Fishing Edge"), DVDs, videos, national TV commercials, product sales videos, point of purchase videos as well as providing underwater photography to the sport fishing industry. Lindner Media Productions customers include such well known companies as Rapala, Berkley, Lund Boats, Shimano, Blue Fox, Storm, MinnKota, Mustad, Nature Vision, Lindy Tackle, Humminbird, Frabill, VMC, HT Enterprises, Mercury Marine, and Gander Mountain.

Lindner has been inducted into three fishing halls of fame and the Lindy Rig was featured in the Minnesota State Historical Society's 2008 list of "Minnesota’s 150 — The people, places, and things that shape our state".

== Early life ==
Lindner learned his love for fishing while spending summers at his parents' lake cabin on Lake Ripley in Cambridge, WI acting as the "worm boy" for brother Ron (who is 10 years his senior) so that Ron would let him come along in the boat. At the age of 16, Lindner entered and won a Musky Derby, received a nice cash prize, and was interviewed by a television station in Duluth, MN. Presented with the prospect of pursuing his boyhood sport and both earning money and gaining media face-time, Lindner became obsessed with idea of becoming a professional sport fisherman. Throughout High School, Lindner had few odd jobs and no other hobbies - he lived and breathed fishing.

After spending a short tour in the Army from 1965-1966 in Vietnam, the pair moved their families in 1966 first to Wisconsin and then to Brainerd, MN to get their start in the fishing tackle and guide business. Once established as fishermen and as fishing guides, the Lindners decided to test the waters of outdoor television in 1970. With Lindner in front of the camera and brother Ron scripting, filming, and directing the show, the pair filmed their first episode on Big Sand Lake near Park Rapids, MN teaching people how to find and catch fish. Lindner spent days in the boat either filming television shows, fishing in a bass or walleye tournament, or on a local lake perfecting his craft.

Over the next thirteen years, the brothers invented and marketed numerous lures (such as the Lindy Rig, No-Snagg fishing sinker, and the Rapala VMC product line for walleye fishing), with some selling in the millions, launched, Lindy Tackle company (which they sold in 1973), authored many books and articles, fished tournaments, did radio shows. In 1979, they created In-Fisherman, the parent company for the sport fishing magazine and nationally syndicated radio and television shows of the same name.

== Christian conversion ==
Although brother Ron was a self-diagnosed alcoholic, Lindner only drank socially. However, his real addiction was fishing. From the point that Lindner moved Minnesota until he retired from full-time competitive fishing, in the Bassmaster Professional Tournament Tour in 1979, he spent as many as two hundred and fifty days on the water in a single year.

After Ron and his wife became born-again Christians at an evangelical meeting (Lowell Lundstrom Crusade) in Crosby, MN in 1978, and Lindner's wife Mary did the same soon after, Lindner was constantly bombarded by the spiritual "Truth", but rejected it. He was on nationwide TV and money was coming in from many sources so in his words he thought "Why did I need to make some sort of extra special spiritual commitment?" However the one thing that he didn't have was contentment, peace, or fulfillment. Finally, with the help of his wife and family and a local preacher, Lindner gave his life to Jesus in 1982. After his conversion, Lindner gave up fishing on the Bassmaster and BCA Professional Tournament Fishing circuits and instead fishes only a few select tournaments a year in order to spend more time with his family. Lindner also left touring in order to spend more time with God and is a long-time attendee of the charismatic Agape Christian Church in Brainerd. Lindner says that while he and Ron have had the privilege of building successful careers in sport fishing, God has also allowed them to use this venue to share their faith in Christ. "When I first started to share my faith in Christ with others, I found myself naturally using fishing experiences to illustrate and explain God's kingdom," notes Lindner. "God has used the gift he has given Ron and me in this sport, and has taken the fishing-related experiences we've had through our years as professional anglers for His own purposes."

The Lindner brothers' most recent book First Light on the Water highlights the life lessons they learned on and off the water and how faith guides their life. Lindner's faith and how he molds it and his sport fishing career has been featured in the April 2005 issue of Charisma, the July/August issue of New Man magazine, and on the God's Great Outdoors Christian radio program.

== Life on the water ==
Through his efforts to make fishing more accessible - and successful - to people of all ages, he helped to develop the F+L+P=S (Fish + Location + Presentation = Success) formula, which is described as the algebra of angling. Developed over a period of time, and inspired by Lindner's guru and mentor and well-known Wisconsin fisherman, Bill Binkelman, the formula was hammered into shape in the 1974 inaugural issue of the In-Fisherman magazine and includes a simple frame work that anglers could not only understand fish behavior, location and bait presentation, but discuss with each other and could be used independent of the type or location of the lake or river.

Later in life, Lindner has been showered with recognition of his lifetime supporting sport fishing. In 2000, Lindner was elected as a part of the inaugural class of inductees into the Minnesota Fishing Hall of Fame. On May 22, 2002, Lindner (and brother Ron) received the Hedley Donovan Award at the Minnesota Magazine and Publications Association annual awards for their contributions to Minnesota's magazine industry. In 2005, Lindner was elected into the Professional Bass Fishing Hall of Fame. On July 12, 2007, Lindner was honored as the 2007 Samuel C. Johnson Fishing Journalist of the Year, based on his contributions to the fishing industry in the fields of journalism, conservation and philanthropic leadership, at the 2007 International Convention of Allied Sportfishing Trades in Las Vegas, NV. Also in 2007, Lindner (along with brother Ron) was inducted into the Normark Hall of Fame for the indelible mark their involvement has made on the history of Normark, the angling industry and for their instrumental contributions to the growth and longevity of Normark (which is best known as the distributor of Rapala, Storm, Blue Fox and other fishing tackle companies).

In 2008, Lindner was elected to the Fresh Water Fishing Hall of Fame in Hayward, WI, after being previously elected in the "Legendary Angler" category in 1988. Nephew James was also recently inducted in the same Hall of Fame as a Legendary Communicator.

After the Lindners sold the In-Fisherman company to Primedia Broadcasting in 1998, Lindner continued to work with In-Fisherman and host the television show under contract. As of June 2001, the In-Fisherman brand was a multi-media giant; In-Fisherman broadcasts was seen nationally by about 600,000 households and aired Saturday and Sunday on The National Network (now known as Spike); In-Fisherman magazine had 310,000 subscribers; In-Fisherman Radio had more than 800 affiliate stations in 48 states airing six programs a week; and the company annually released fishing guides, other magazines and videos, and sponsored a $1.2 million professional walleye fishing tournament series. However, Lindner chose to allow his contract to expire in 2001 and in 2002, he and Ron created a new company, "Angling Edge", which is centered around their Christian faith and the award-winning show of the same name. In 2011, Lindner started his 41st year of fishing television with the current series of "Angling Edge". Lindner has co-authored 10 books with brother Ron.
