= Alton Jones Jr. =

Alton Jones Jr., known as "Little Alton" is a professional bass fisherman who competes in Major League Fishing.

Jones is a 2014 Baylor University graduate and the son of professional fisherman Alton Jones Sr., the winner of six B.A.S.S. events, who claims Alton Jr. is a better fisherman than him, after graduating college Jones fished two seasons in the Bassmaster Opens to qualify for the Elites, in 2016 Jones finished high in the Central Division, and finalized in the Bass Pro Shops Bassmaster Central Opens against nearly 400 Anglers including 12 professionals, finishing the 3 day tournament with a 35-pound, 14-ounce stringer, allowing him to compete in the 2017 Bassmaster Classic.

Jones considers Lake Champlain as "one of the most fun fish catching places I’ve ever been,” Jones claims it's not abnormal to catch over a hundred bass in a day.

Jones lives in Lorena, Texas.
