= Ott Defoe =

Professional bass fisherman

- Born: September 17, 1985 (age 40)
- Occupation: Professional fisherman
- Organization: MLF Bass Pro Tour
- Known for: Sport fishing
- Awards: 2019 B.A.S.S. Classic Champion

Arthur F. DeFoe better known as Ott Defoe (born September 17, 1985), is a professional bass fisherman from Knoxville, Tennessee.

He was the 2019 Bassmaster Classic Champion with a total weigh in of 49lbs -3oz and took the cash winnings of $300,000 (US). As of March 2019 he has had 6 wins in Bassmaster Professional Tournaments and has collected over $2,000,000 in prize money.

He was the Bassmaster 2011 Rookie of the Year.

He is sponsored by Bass Pro Shops, Nitro Boats, Mercury, Humminbird, Mossy Oak, Minn Kota/Talon, General Tire, Costa, Huk, Buff, T-H Marine, Lithium Pros, Rapala Terminator, VMC, Onyx/Arctic Shield, Aqua-Vu, Swagger Tackle, Superior Walls of East Tennessee/Warrior Precast, Dowco, and Joe's Jerky.

== Personal life ==
He is married to his wife Jennie and they have three children Abbie, Parker, and Elizabeth.

He is the son of Bud and Erieka DeFoe.

== Career stats ==
- 1 Bassmaster Classic Titles
- Career winnings: over $2,000,000 (B.A.S.S.)
- Career Wins: 6
- Career Top Ten finishes: 28
- Times in the BASSMASTER Classic: 8
