= Bill Dance Outdoors =

- Created by: Bill Dance
- Theme music composer: David Muir
- Opening theme: "Gone Fishin' with Bill Dance Today"
- Country of origin: United States
- No. of episodes: 900

Production
- Running time: 30 minutes

Original release
- Network: WHBQ-TV
- Release: January 5, 1968 – 1981
- Network: ESPN
- Release: 1981 – 1989
- Network: TNN
- Release: 1989 – 2002
- Network: Outdoor Life Network
- Release: 2003 – 2012
- Network: NBCSN
- Release: 2012 – 2021
- Network: Outdoor Channel
- Release: present

Bill Dance Outdoors is a half-hour fishing television series hosted by former professional tournament angler Bill Dance. Each episode focuses on various aspects of recreational fishing techniques, usually targeting black bass species, such as Largemouth and Smallmouth bass, though does occasionally focus on other species such as Channel catfish and Bluegill. Each episode is about half-hour long, and will occasionally include viewer mail, product advertisement, and tips & tricks segments along with the primary topic of the particular episode. The show has featured guest appearances by celebrities such as Terry Bradshaw, Hank Williams, Jr., Mel Tillis, Jerry Reed, and many others. The theme music used for his show is "Gone Fishin' with Bill Dance Today" by David Muir. The show was produced by Strike King Productions from 1988 to 1997. Since 1998, the show was produced by DM Outdoor Teleproductions (DMOT, Inc.).

The show began as a local program on a Memphis, Tennessee ABC affiliate WHBQ-TV on January 5, 1968. In 1981, the show was picked up by ESPN, which stayed until 1988. In 1989, the show was picked up by TNN, which stayed until 2002. In 2003, the show was picked up by Outdoor Life Network (now known as NBCSN in the United States). Tony McClure is the executive producer.

== Theme song ==
- For the first 22 seasons (1968–90), the show's original theme song was "Today is Mine" by Jerry Reed.
- Beginning in Season 23 (1990–91), the show's current theme song is "Gone Fishin' with Bill Dance Today" by David Muir.

== See also ==
- Fishing television series
