= Bassmaster Classic XLI =

Fishing tournament in 2011

Bassmaster Classic XLI was held February 18–20, 2011 in the Louisiana Delta surrounding New Orleans, Louisiana. Kevin VanDam of Kalamazoo, Michigan, won the event with a three-day total weight of 69 pounds, 11 ounces. He won $500,000 in prize money. The total weight for the classic was 1,506 pounds, 5 ounces with the heaviest average bass weight being 2.6850 pounds.

Top 5 finishers
1. Kevin VanDam, 69-11
2. Aaron Martens, 59-00
3. Derek Remitz, 56-08
4. Brandon Palaniuk, 31-09
5. Brent Chapman, 31-03

== See also ==
- Bassmaster Classic
