= Alton Jones =

Alton Jones may refer to:

- W. Alton Jones (1891–1962), American industrialist and philanthropist
- Alton Jones Jr., American bass fisherman
- Alton Jones (racing driver)
