= William D. Gaskin =

Alabama politician

William D. Gaskin was a state legislator in Alabama during the Reconstruction era. He represented Lowndes County in the Alabama House of Representatives. He was documented as living in an area served by the Manack, Alabama post office.

He served as an election supervisor and gave testimony on election activities. He alleged vote rigging.

He testified that he was a farmer who had lived in Pinthala beat for about 18 years and was African American. He testified January 17, 1883 about his work as election supervisor.

He was expelled from the House in 1871 on a charge of bribery. According to Hasan Kwame Jeffries, he and Jones were expelled on bogus allegations as white Democrats retook power in the legislature and across Alabama at the end of Reconstruction.

== See also ==
- African American officeholders from the end of the Civil War until before 1900
