= Cliff Pace =

American professional bass fisherman

- Born: Cliff Pace; May 23, 1980 (age 45)
- Citizenship: United States
- Occupation: Professional Fisherman
- Years active: 2002-present
- Organization(s): B.A.S.S. & Major League Fishing
- Known for: Sport Fishing
- Spouse: Tiffany Pace
- Children: Jordan Baylee
- Awards: 2013 Bassmaster Classic Champion & 2019 MLF Bass Pro Tour Stage Eight winner in Neenah, WI

Cliff Pace (born May 23, 1980) often called “Game Face Pace”, is a professional bass fisherman from Petal, Mississippi. Pace is the 43rd world champion of bass fishing and the 39th member of the B.A.S.S. Millionaires Club. Pace has predominantly fished the Bass Anglers Sportsman Society (BASS) Bassmasters tournament series during his career but now competes in the Major League Fishing Bass Pro Tour.

== Biography ==
Cliff Pace was born in Petal, Mississippi. He has competed in 100 tournaments, and had three first-place finishes and twenty-five top ten finishes.

He resides in Petal, Mississippi with his wife, Tiffany and his daughter, Jordan Baylee.

== Career stats ==
Tournaments Entered: 155
Winnings: $1,762,740.00
Wins: 4
Top 10s: 31
Top 20s: 48
Money finishes: 78
Classic Appearance: 8

== Awards ==
2013 Bassmaster Classic Champion

2019 MLF Bass Pro Tour Stage Eight in Neenah, WI.

== See also ==
- Angling
- Bass fishing
- Bassmaster Classic
- Fishing tournament
