= Bassmaster Classic XXIX =

Angling competition

Bassmaster Classic XXIX was held July 29-31, 1999 in the Louisiana Delta surrounding New Orleans, Louisiana. Davy Hite of Prosperity, South Carolina, was the winner of the 29th Classic with a three-day total of 15 bass weighing 55 pounds, 10 ounces. He took home a total of $101,000, which included a $1,000 bonus for catching the big bass on Day 2. The total weight for the classic was 1,219 pounds, 4 ounces.

Top 5 finishers

1. Davy Hite, Prosperity, South Carolina, 55-10
2. Denny Brauer, Camdenton, Missouri, 45-11
3. Larry Nixon, Bee Branch, Arkansas, 43-14
4. Gary Klein, Weatherford, Texas, 42-1
5. Ron Shuffield, Bismarck, Arkansas, 40-04

== See also ==
- Bassmaster Classic
