= Jordan Lee (fisherman) =

American fisherman

- Born: June 30, 1991 (age 35); Cullman, Alabama
- Citizenship: United States of America
- Occupation: Professional fisherman
- Organization: Major League Fishing Bass Pro Tour
- Known for: Sport fishing
- Awards: 2017 & 2018 B.A.S.S. Classic Champion

Jordan Lee (born June 30, 1991) is a professional bass fisherman from Cullman, Alabama.

Lee was the 2017 Bassmaster Classic Champion with a total weigh in of 56lbs -10oz and took the cash winnings of $300,000 (US). As of March 2017 he has had 14 top ten finishes in Bassmaster Professional Tournaments.

Lee attended Auburn University and placed third with teammate Shane Powell in the Carhartt Bassmaster College Championship in 2013.

Lee is currently sponsored by A.R.E. Truck Caps, Lowrance Electronics, T-H Marine, Berkley, Abu Garcia, Plano, Ranger Boats, Carhartt, Power-Pole, and Mossy Oak.

Like many other professionals on the Bassmaster tour, Lee has a series of videos on bass fishing.

On March 18 of 2018, Lee became the third fisherman to win consecutive Bassmaster Classics.

== Career stats ==
- 2 Bassmaster Classic Titles
- Career winnings: $1,123,429 (B.A.S.S.)
- Career Top Ten finishes: 21
- Total Tournaments 60
- Total Weight 2313lb - 13oz
- Classic Appearances 4
