= Mark Davis' The Fishing Master =

1995 video game

- North American cover art
- Developer: Natsume Co., Ltd.
- Publishers: JP: Acclaim Entertainment; NA: Natsume Inc.
- Composers: Iku Mizutani; Kinuyo Yamashita
- Platform: Super NES
- Release: JP: June 30, 1995; NA: April 1996
- Genre: Fishing
- Mode: Single-player

Mark Davis' The Fishing Master is a fishing video game developed by Natsume for the Super Nintendo Entertainment System.

The game features Mark Davis' voice. It became a cult video game due to its difficulty level and attention to detail about lures and weather effects. A sequel, Mark Davis Pro Bass Challenge, was released in 2003 for PlayStation 2 and 2005 for GameCube.

== Gameplay ==
Catching a fish

Only catching black bass is allowed. All other kinds of fish are prohibited and do not count towards the total score. Each lake has different criteria for passing the challenge and moving on to the next level. Players can assemble their own fishing gear. Realistic fish AI allows players to practice real-life fishing techniques on the virtual fish.

In the practice mode, the weather and the season can be chosen in order to practice fishing under certain conditions. Spots where fish are guaranteed to show up during the practice session appear as boat icons on the map.

== Reception ==
Reception

Review scores
Publication	Score
Electronic Gaming Monthly	6.75/10
Famitsu	18/40
Next Generation	2/5

On release, Famicom Tsūshin scored the game an 18 out of 40. A reviewer for Next Generation commented that "For all purposes fun and entertaining, Mark Davis' The Fishing Master fails entirely to capture the true challenge of fishing. And while the initial set-up is impressively thorough, offering your choice of seasons, gear, the time of day and location, the actual gameplay mechanics lack realism and make the game less than exciting to play." The two sports reviewers of Electronic Gaming Monthly scored it 7 and 6.5 out of 10. Like Next Generation, they found the game lacks realism, and also criticized that there aren't enough animations and finding fish is "not really user friendly." They concluded that it is fun to play despite these factors, but requires a lot of patience.
