= Mark Davis Pro Bass Challenge =

2003 video game

- PS2 North American cover art
- Developer: Sims
- Publisher: Natsume Inc.
- Platforms: GameCube, PlayStation 2
- Release: PlayStation 2: NA: August 27, 2003; PAL: December 12, 2003; GameCube: NA: September 20, 2005
- Genre: Sports
- Modes: Single-player, multiplayer

Mark Davis Pro Bass Challenge is a bass fishing video game for the GameCube and PlayStation 2.

It is an arcade-style bass fishing game that allows players to experience real world bass tournaments in a 3-D graphics format. The various tournaments follow the official rules, schedules and rating system of true American Bass Fishing tournaments. The gameplay is focused on winning matches and allowing the user to work their way up to the top, gathering equipment and rankings along the way, and compete against Mark Davis. It is the sequel to Mark Davis' The Fishing Master for Super Nintendo Entertainment System.
