= Bassmaster Classic XXXIII =

Bass fishing tournament in 2003

Bassmaster Classic XXXIII was held on August 1-3, 2003, in the Louisiana Delta surrounding New Orleans, Louisiana. Michael Iaconelli of Woodbury Heights, New Jersey, won the event with a three-day total weight of 37 pounds, 14 ounces. He won $200,000 in prize money. The total weight for the classic was 1,009 pounds, 5 ounces and the weigh-in was held in the New Orleans Arena.

Top 5 finishers
1. Michael Iaconelli, Woodbury Heights, New Jersey, 37-14
2. Gary Klein Weatherford, Texas, 36-02
3. Harold Allen, Shelbyville, Texas, 34-03
4. Roland Martin Clewiston, Florida, 31-09
5. Curt Lytle Suffolk, Virginia, 31-03

== See also ==
- Bassmaster Classic
