= Beat Charlie Moore =

American fishing television series

Beat Charlie Moore is an American fishing television series hosted by Charlie Moore that aired on ESPN for eight seasons. It debuted in 2006 and became ESPN's top-rated outdoor show. Guest contestant Chuck Woolery won an Emmy for his appearance on Beat Charlie Moore.

The premise for Beat Charlie Moore is a fishing contest between Moore and a selected viewer at the challenger's home fishing spot. The contest might be for biggest fish caught, most fish caught, or other achievements, and the prize is typically money or dinner. Moore often beats his challengers. The episodes are full of trash talk and humor; Moore describes himself as "Jim Carrey on a bass boat".
