= Ron Lindner =

American sportsman (1934–2020)

Ronald John Lindner (September 1, 1934 – November 30, 2020) was an American sportsman and fishing industry innovator who has invented, along with his younger brother Al Lindner, many fishing lures and rigs including the Lindy Rig which has been used by tens of millions of anglers to catch walleye since it first hit the market in 1968. Lindner estimates that more than 70 million Lindy Rigs - and, as he put it, "its many imitators" - have been sold. Lindner also co-owns the Baxter, MN based Lindner Media Productions, along with Al and sons James, Daniel and Bill, which specializes in producing educational fishing programs (such as "Angling Edge" and "Fishing Edge"), DVDs, videos, national TV commercials, product sales videos, point of purchase videos as well as providing underwater photography to the sport fishing industry. Lindner Media Productions customers include such well known companies as Rapala, Berkley, Lund Boats, Shimano, Blue Fox, Storm, MinnKota, Mustad, Nature Vision, Lindy Tackle, Humminbird, Frabill, VMC, HT Enterprises, Mercury Outboard Motors, and Gander Mountain. Lindner has been inducted into three fishing hall of fames and the Lindy Rig was featured in the Minnesota State Historical Society's 2008 list of "Minnesota’s 150 — The people, places, and things that shape our state".

== Early life ==
Lindner was born in Chicago, Illinois on September 1, 1934. He learned his love for fishing while spending summers at his parents' lake cabin on Lake Ripley in Cambridge, Wisconsin and started fishing at the age of five. Besides catching fish, he was fascinated by the lures, the rods, the reels, and other accessories of the sport. After spending time in the Army in the early 1950s, and after brother Al's short 1965-1966 tour in Vietnam, the pair moved their families in 1966 first to Wisconsin and then to Brainerd, MN to get their start in the fishing tackle and guide business. Once established as fishermen and as fishing guides, the Lindners decided to test the waters of outdoor television in 1970. With Lindner scripting, filming, and directing the show and Al in front of the camera the pair filmed their first episode on Big Sand Lake near Park Rapids, MN teaching people how to find and catch fish.

Over the next thirteen years, the brothers invented and marketed numerous lures (such as the Lindy Rig, No-Snagg fishing sinker, and the Rapala VMC product line for walleye fishing), with some selling in the millions, launched, Lindy Tackle company (which they sold in 1973), authored many books and articles, fished tournaments, produced radio shows. In 1979, they created In-Fisherman, the parent company for the sport fishing magazine and nationally syndicated radio and television shows of the same name.

However happiness eluded him even though he was living his fantasy of fishing throughout the world (while wife Dolores was at home raising seven children alone). Running with hard-living people, his excesses finally caught up with him when he got his third DUI in 1973 and was forced into Alcoholics Anonymous. For the next five years he struggled with alcohol and the guilt, remorse, and depression common with alcoholism. It all came to a head in 1978 while working at the Minneapolis Sports Show where after going on a drinking binge he lost a day and a half and thought his car had been stolen (which he had in fact abandoned 2 blocks from his hotel).

== Christian conversion ==
Driving back to Brainerd, he listened to a radio preacher who quoted from 1 Corinthians 6:9-10, "Do you not know that the wicked will not inherit the kingdom of God? Do not be deceived: Neither the sexually immoral nor idolaters nor adulterers nor male prostitutes nor homosexual offenders nor thieves nor the greedy nor drunkards." It was then that Lindner realized that he was a drunk, a lost and damaged soul, and he needed God's help. Arriving home, his wife, without knowing what had happened either in Minneapolis or on the drive home, suggested that they go listen to an evangelist in Crosby, MN with Al and his wife, Mary. After listening to the preacher's sermon and how "drunkards would never see the kingdom of heaven", Lindner went forward, confessed his sins, and asked Jesus into his heart as his Lord and Savior. Brother Al would also become a born-again Christian in 1982.

The Lindner brothers' most recent book First Light on the Water highlights the life lessons they learned on and off the water and how faith guides their life. Lindner's faith and how he molds it and his sport fishing career has been featured in the April 2005 issue of Charisma, the July/August issue of New Man magazine, and on the God's Great Outdoors Christian radio program.

== Life on the water ==
Through his efforts to make fishing more accessible - and successful - to people of all ages, he developed the F+L+P=S (Fish + Location + Presentation = Success) formula, which is described as the algebra of angling. Developed over a period of time, and inspired by Lindner's guru and mentor and well-known Minnesota fisherman, Bill Binkelman, the formula was hammered into shape in the 1974 inaugural issue of the In-Fisherman magazine and includes a simple frame work that anglers could not only understand fish behavior, location and bait presentation, but discuss with each other and could be used independent of the type or location of the lake or river.

Later in life, Lindner has been showered with recognition of his lifetime supporting sport fishing. In 2000, Lindner was elected as a part of the inaugural class of inductees into the Minnesota Fishing Hall of Fame. On May 22, 2002, the Ron (and brother Al) received the Hedley Donovan Award at the Minnesota Magazine and Publications Association annual awards for their contributions to Minnesota's magazine industry. In 2007, Lindner (along with his brother Al) was inducted into the Normark Hall of Fame for the indelible mark their involvement has made on the history of Normark, the angling industry and for their instrumental contributions to the growth and longevity of Normark (which is best known as the distributor of Rapala, Storm, Blue Fox and other fishing tackle companies). In 2008, Lindner was elected to the Fresh Water Fishing Hall of Fame in Hayward, WI, after being previously elected in the "Legendary Angler" category in 1988. Son James was also recently inducted in the same Hall of Fame as a Legendary Communicator.

After the Lindners sold the In-Fisherman company to Primedia Broadcasting in 1998, a year in which revenues totalled $13 million, Lindner retired from full-time work, but continued to work with In-Fisherman under contract. As of June 2001, the In-Fisherman brand was a multimedia giant; In-Fisherman broadcasts was seen nationally by about 600,000 households and aired Saturday and Sunday on The National Network (now known as Spike); In-Fisherman magazine had 310,000 subscribers; In-Fisherman Radio had more than 800 affiliate stations in 48 states airing six programs a week; and the company annually released fishing guides, other magazines and videos, and sponsored a $1.2 million professional walleye fishing tournament series. In 2002, the brothers created a new company, "Angling Edge", which is centered around their Christian faith and the award-winning show of the same name. In 2011, Lindner started his 41st year of fishing television with their current series of "Angling Edge" and still works toward his original vision of "teaching folks how to catch more and bigger fish". Lindner has co-authored 10 books with brother al and owns 3 patents on his fishing lures and has 30 unique designs to his credit.

== Death ==
Lindner died at his home in Baxter, Minnesota, on November 30, 2020, at the age of 86.
