= Ted Ames =

American fisher

- Born: 1939 (age 86–87)
- Education: University of Maine
- Occupation: fisherman
- Known for: Penobscot East Resource Center

Ted Ames (born 1939) is a Maine fisherman, and former hatchery director of Penobscot East Resource Center.

== Life ==
He graduated from the University of Maine with a master's degree in biochemistry. He mapped the fish spawning grounds over time showing a loss of productive grounds. He was a Scholar-in-Residence at Bowdoin College in Brunswick, Maine 2010–2011.

== Awards ==
- 2005 MacArthur Fellows Program
- 2007 University of Maine Geddes W. Simpson Distinguished Lecture

== See also ==
- List of American fishers
