= Striped bass fishing =

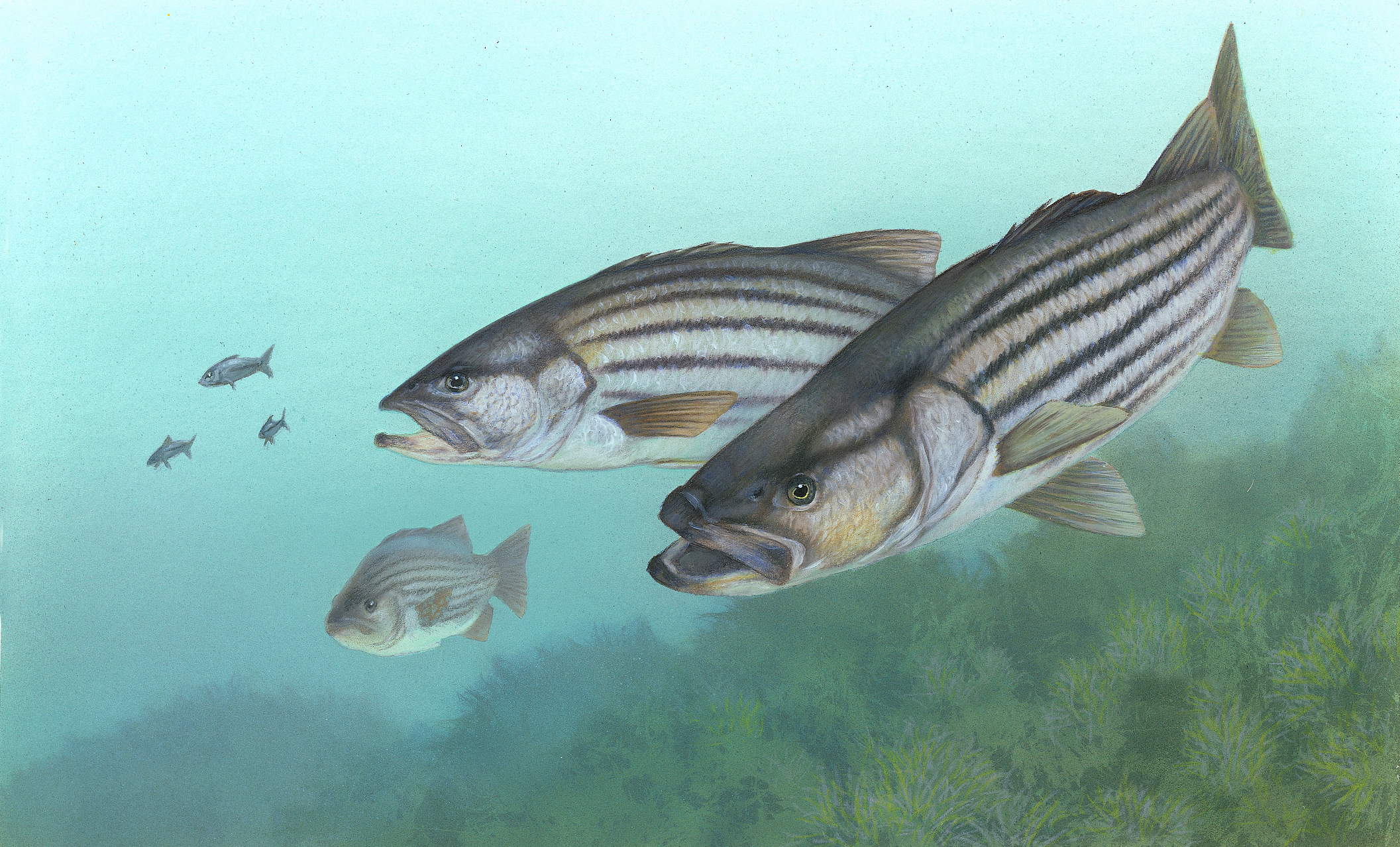
Striped bass

Striped bass are perciform fish found all along the Atlantic coast, from Florida to Nova Scotia. A distinct strain has historically existed in the Gulf of Mexico, but the fishery that exists there today is for stocked or reservoir-escapee fish. (Note: Reproducing Gulf striped bass populations exist only in the Appalachicola–Chattahoochee–Flint river system at present, but reproduction is not sufficient to naturally maintain the fishery.) Striped bass are of significant value as sporting fish, and have been introduced to many areas outside their native range.

== Ecology ==
Striped bass (Morone saxatilis, also called rock or rockfish) are typical members of the family Moronidae in shape, having a streamlined, silvery body marked with longitudinal dark stripes running from behind the gills to the base of the tail. They inhabit rivers, bays, inlets, estuaries, and creeks and are anadromous. They are quite abundant in the Chesapeake Bay and its tributaries. There, they frequently grow over four feet in length and weigh over 22 kg (50 lb). A variety of angling methods are used to catch them, including trolling and surfcasting. The largest striped bass ever caught by angling was an 81.8 lb specimen taken in Westbrook, Connecticut on August 4, 2011. The striped bass will swim up rivers a hundred miles or more, and in Maine they are quite plentiful in the Penobscot River and Kennebec River. Further south in Connecticut some very large ones are taken both offshore and in the Connecticut River, and the waters surrounding New York City have proven a fertile fishing ground with good sized specimens being caught during spring and summer months. In southern states such as Florida, striped bass are raised in hatcheries and are considered freshwater sportfish.

In 2019, the recreational bass fishing season was cancelled before it started in the state of Virginia. This decision was taken due to the female spawning stock biomass (SSB) falling below the threshold deemed necessary for a healthy fish stock. In the state of Maryland, the fishing season remained open.

== Distribution ==
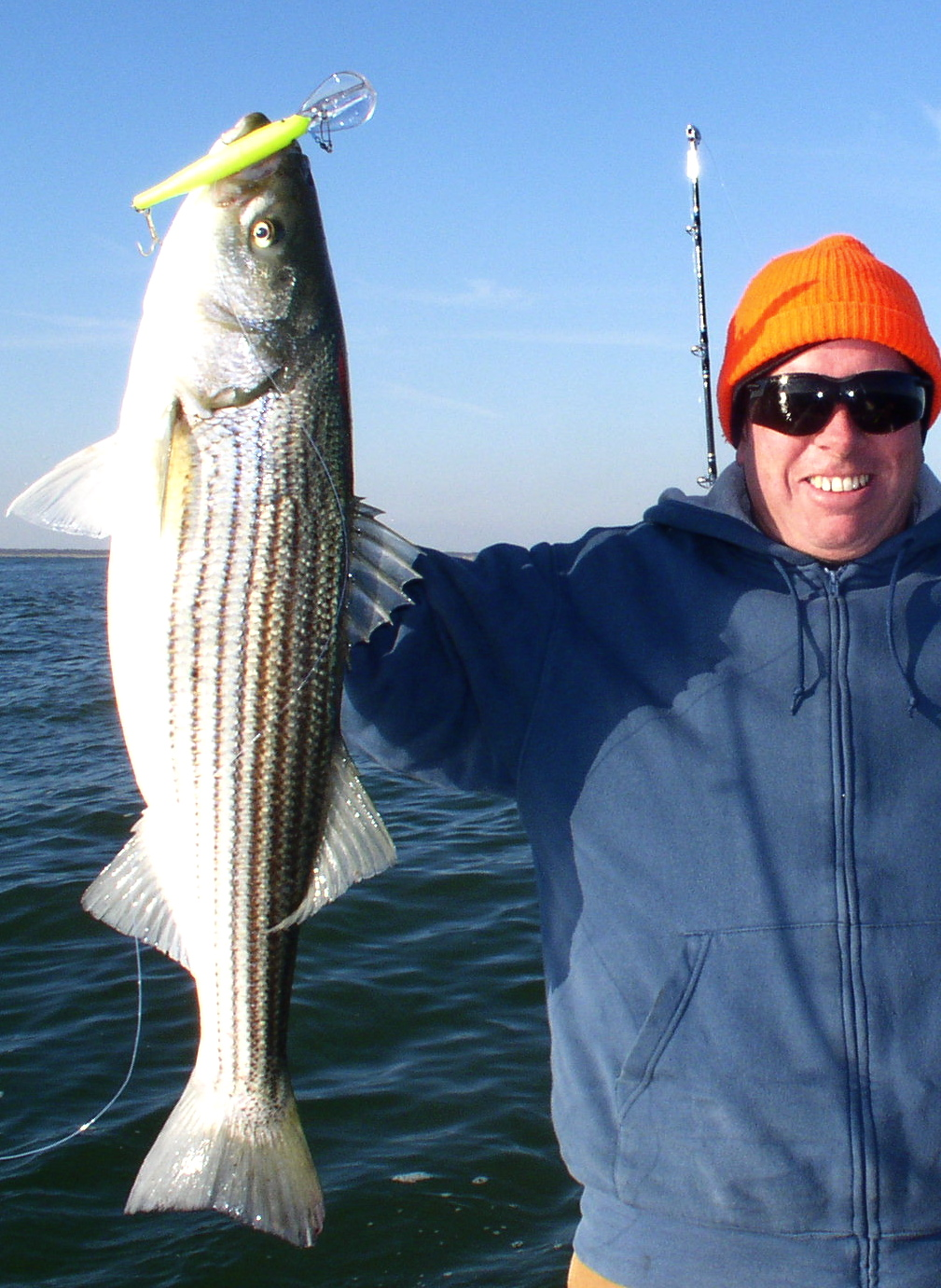
Fishing for striped bass off Cape Hatteras, North Carolina

East Coast striped bass are typically found from the Carolinas to Nova Scotia. The Chesapeake Bay is the major producer area for striped bass, with the Hudson River being a secondary producer. Spawning migration begins in March when the migratory component of the stock returns to their natal rivers to spawn. It is believed that females migrate after age five. These fish are believed to remain in the ocean during the spawning run. Males as young as two years old have been encountered in the spawning areas of the Chesapeake bay. The migratory range of the northern (Hudson stock) extends from the Carolinas to New York's Hudson River in the winter time and from New Jersey through Maine in summertime with the greatest concentration between Long Island, New York, Rhode Island, and Massachusetts. The migration of the northern stock to the south often begins in September from areas in Maine.

On the West Coast, striped bass are found throughout the San Francisco Bay and surrounding coastline. They are also found in the California Aqueduct canal system, and many California lakes such as Lake Castaic, Lake Skinner, Diamond Valley Reservoir, Silverwood Lake, Pyramid Lake, San Antonio Lake, and others. The striped bass have also developed into a prominent predator in many Colorado River lakes: Lake Havasu, Lake Mead, Lake Powell, Lake Pleasant and Lake Mohave. The Lake Mohave record striped bass weighed in at 60 lbs 14 oz. Furthermore, striped bass are now located all across the nation. Frequent "boils" or swarms, often consisting of twenty or more striped bass, may be observed in these lakes, representing an excellent fishing opportunity, especially with Pencil Poppers or other similar trout-looking surface lures where trout and other similar sized fish are often stocked.

In winter they keep to their haunts, and do not go into deep water like other fish of similar habits. In the spring of the year the striped bass runs up the rivers and into other fresh water places to spawn - and then again late in the fall to shelter. The fall run is the best. They can be caught however nearly all the year round, and of all sizes.

== Bait ==
Striped bass can be caught using a number of baits including: clams, eels, anchovies, bloodworms, nightcrawlers, chicken livers, mackerel menhaden, herring, shad, and sandworms. At times, striped bass can be very choosy about the baits they take. Because of the wide variety of baits that are known to work and their finicky nature, they are considered among fishermen as being an opportunistic or "lazy" feeder. However, it is estimated that 90% of their diet is fish.

== Fishing technique ==
Fishing for stripers can be a rewarding experience for the experienced fisherman. Keepers caught from the surf commonly weigh in from 20 to 40 pounds. But they can grow much larger.

Stripers are migratory, and will move up and down the coasts and into river systems to spawn, and back out to sea throughout the year. But close in to the shoreline, the bite begins when the water reaches 50 degrees Fahrenheit in the spring, tapers off as the hot summer approaches, and returns in force in the fall. The bite activity then dies down again as water temperatures drift back down to the forties in late fall and early winter.

Fishermen often use fluorocarbon leaders when fishing for stripers so that the fish can not see the fishing line in the water.

=== Beach ===
Successful striper fishing from the surf comes down to equipment, timing, structure and bait.

Basic equipment for surf fishing includes a surf rod and reel (either conventional or spinning), a sand spike, appropriate terminal tackle, appropriate line, and appropriate clothing. A typical surf rod is 8–12 feet long, and after casting, is held vertical in a sand spike. Typical line is 20 pound test monofilament or 30-60 pound test braided line. Terminal tackle includes a large array of devices, each a variation of the same theme: the thing at the end of your line with the hook on it. Baits, lures, plugs, poppers, and artificials all have their place in fishing for stripers in the surf. Each has its advantage, depending on conditions and fish activity.

Timing is a rich subject amongst fishermen. High tide, low tide, dawn, dusk, lunar phases, water clarity and temperature, barometric pressure, storm fronts, these are all subjects that the striper fishermen will familiarize himself with, regardless if fishing from the surf, jetty, boat, or bridge.

Structure refers to the physical structure of the bottom of the ocean along shore. Sand bars, washes, holes, points, cuts, sloughs, pockets, rips, and the drop off are all structures. Most cannot be seen from line of sight, since they are under water. Stripers love three things: moving water, structure, and food. All three can be found within yards of the shoreline. And since stripers and their food sources have tendencies to hold to certain types of structure at certain times of the day and year, it becomes important for the fisherman to learn how to read structure.

=== Spear ===
The IGFA World Spear Fishing Record Striped Bass was shot by Dave Hochman off the coast of Rhode Island in 2008. Dave's striper came in at 55 inches, 68.4 pounds. Dave took the fish during a free dive at a depth of 54 feet.

=== Jetty ===
Safety is a key issue for jetty fishermen. One slip or large wave can mean broken bones, or worse. The jetty fisherman's two best pieces of equipment are a sound mind and a stout pair of jetty spikes.

=== Bridge ===
Bridge fishing for stripers can also be productive. However, preparation and planning are key. Heavy duty equipment and line is a requirement. A bridge net and grappling hook are also useful, as is a plan for landing the fish if it cannot be hauled up out of the water. Bridge fishermen will often walk the rod to one end of the bridge, passing it around light poles and signs, in order to access the water from a lower elevation to land the fish.

Trolling from a boat running parallel to the bridge is a common technique used to catch striped bass. In order to maintain control of the trolled lure and to prevent becoming snagged on the pilings, a heavy weight is attached to a three-way swivel. The lure is attached to the other part of the swivel, with the main line rising from the third part. This allows the boater to troll a lure down near the bottom where the larger fish are, without having to let out too much line near the bridge.

=== Boat ===
Fishing for stripers from a boat requires good knowledge of tidal conditions and how they relate to feeding patterns of stripers. Boat-fishing techniques include trolling live bait or artificial lures, drifting or 'livelining' live bait such as eels, bunker or other baitfish, bottom-fishing with cut bait such as clams or bunker chunks, jigging with weighted lures, and flycasting.

Kayak fishing for stripers is also on the increase, with the introduction of stable fishing oriented kayaks.

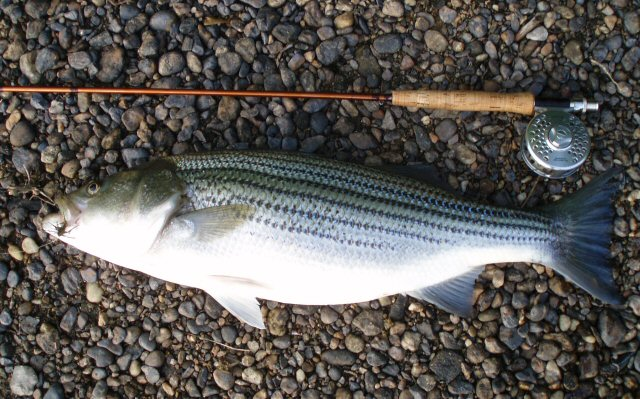
Flyrod caught striped bass from the Coosa River near Wetumpka, Alabama (Released)

Striped bass may also be pursued through flats fishing in some parts of their range.

== Fishery management ==
The Atlantic coast migratory striped bass fishery had collapsed by the 1970s and early 1980s due to a combination of habitat degradation and overfishing. The 1982 year class of striped bass represented the best reproductive and recruitment effort in ten years, and initial management efforts were directed at rebuilding the juvenile abundance index. It took until 1995 for the female spawning stock biomass (SSB) to be deemed fully recovered by the Atlantic States Marine Fisheries Commission (ASMFC).

Due to the loss of SSB assessed in 2017, the ASMFC adopted an addendum to an amendment to the Atlantic Striped Bass Interstate Fishery Management Plan mandating use of circle hooks when fishing with bait to reduce fish deaths following catch-and-release associated with gut hooking. The use of non-offset circle hooks has been suggested to reduce rates of deep hooking, which is one of the greatest contributors to post-release mortality in striped bass, and possibly reduce the likelihood of imminently fatal wounds, such as liver or heart lacerations, even when a fish is deeply hooked. The special regulation took effect January 1, 2021. Different rigging and hookset techniques are required when fishing with circle hooks than when J-hooks are used; the ASMFC acknowledged the need for angler education in its regulation and staggered the implementation of the circle hook provision relative to other stipulations of the plan addendum, although Connecticut implemented the recommendation in December 2020.

The Maryland Department of Natural Resources posts a red–yellow–green caution flag advisory during its summer striper season, based on forecast air temperature, and recommends fishing for species other than striped bass during "red" days (air temperature at Baltimore/Washington International Airport expected to be above 95 °F or 35 °C), or special handling practices for caught fish during "yellow" days (air temperature expected to be between 90 and 94 °F or 32 and 34 °C).

In North Carolina, the Albemarle-Roanoke population of striped bass has a fishery that is jointly managed by the North Carolina Marine Fisheries Commission and the North Carolina Wildlife Resources Commission (NCWRC). Despite being anadromous, striped bass in the Albemarle Sound, Currituck Sound, Croatan Sound, Roanoke Sound and Roanoke River do not migrate coastally until more advanced ages relative to other populations and are thus not subject to the Interstate Fishery Management Plan as of 2022. In 2021, the harvest quota in the Roanoke River Management Area was reduced from 68,750 pounds (31,180 kg) to 12,800 pounds (5,800 kg) due to declining stocks, and the harvest season in 2023 was restricted to six days. Use of barbless hooks throughout 2023 is recommended by the NCWRC and is mandated in the upper Roanoke River.

In 2022, the ASMFC defined a fishing-related mortality (F) threshold for overfishing of 0.24, which included harvest from both recreational and commercial fishing and mortality after catch and release. The ASFMC also identified an SSB of 202 million pounds (92 million kg), equivalent to its value in 1995, as being needed to be re-achieved by 2029 to ensure a sustainable fishery. As of 2021, the SSB was 143 million pounds, and the F value was 0.14, lower than the updated threshold and targeted F values of 0.20 and 0.17, respectively, suggesting that overfishing was no longer ongoing, but that the fishery still needed to rebuild.

In Canada, Atlantic migratory striped bass fisheries remain in the Miramichi River and Shubenacadie River; the Miramichi River population reached a nadir in the late 1990s to early 2000s. The striped bass population of the St. Lawrence River is listed as endangered on the Species at Risk Act, but the Committee on the Status of Endangered Wildlife in Canada considers it to be extinct and replaced by stocked fish. Fisheries in Canada are regulated by the Government of Canada, which mandates use of barbless hooks in tidal areas, with a recommendation to use barbless non-offset circle hooks when bait fishing. As of 2023, fishing is allowed to begin no earlier than two hours before sunrise and end no later than two hours after sunset.

The ASFMC management plan also does not apply to striped bass populations from the Tar River and Pamlico Sound southward, as these populations do not coastally migrate to the degree that northern populations do.

== See also ==
- Bass fishing
- The Downeaster "Alexa"
