= Casey Ashley =

American sport fisherman (born 1984)

- Born: February 1, 1984 (age 42); Donalds, South Carolina, U.S.
- Occupation: Professional angler
- Organization: MLF Bass Pro Tour
- Known for: Sport fishing
- Spouse: McKenzie Hartman Ashley
- Awards: 2015 B.A.S.S. Classic Champion

Casey Ashley (born February 1, 1984), is a professional bass fisherman from Donalds, South Carolina. Ashley attended Piedmont Technical College, a two-year community college, where he earned a degree in Industrial Electronics.

Ashley started fishing professionally on the B.A.S.S. Southern Tour before moving to the Elite Series in 2007.

He was the 2015 Bassmaster Classic Champion with a total weigh in of 50lbs -1oz and took the cash winnings of $300,000 (US). As of March 2017 he has had 11 wins in Bassmaster Professional Tournaments.

Ashley is sponsored by Mercury, Caymas Boats, Forty Creek Whiskey, MotorGuide, Costa, Quantum, Zoom Bait Company, HI-SEAS, Lowrance, Simms, Yeti Coolers, GreenFish Tackle and Power-Pole.

Like many other professionals on the Bassmaster tour, Ashley has a series of videos on bass fishing.

== Career stats ==
- 1 Bassmaster Classic Titles
- Career winnings: over $1.500,000 (B.A.S.S.)
- Career Wins: 4
- Career Top Ten finishes: 26
- Times in the BASSMASTER Classic: 10
