= Mark Davis (fisherman) =

American sport fisherman

- Born: October 11, 1963 (age 62); Mount Ida, Arkansas
- Citizenship: United States of America
- Occupation: Professional fisherman
- Years active: 1990-present
- Known for: Sport fishing
- Spouse: Tilly
- Children: James, Hunter, Fisher
- Awards: 3 time B.A.S.S. Angler of the Year

Mark Davis (born October 11, 1963) is a professional sport fisherman of the Bass Anglers Sportsman Society (B.A.S.S.) and is one of only two anglers to have won the B.A.S.S. Angler of the Year and the Bassmasters Classic tournament in the same year.

== Biography ==
Davis was born in Mount Ida, Arkansas. He has competed in 234 tournaments, and had five first-place finishes and forty-five top ten finishes.

He resides in Mount Ida, with his wife Tilly and their three children James, Hunter and Fisher,

== Awards ==
3-time B.A.S.S. Angler of the Year (1995, 1998, 2001)
1995 Bassmaster Classic Champion

== Video games ==
- Mark Davis' The Fishing Master (known as Oomono Black Bass Fishing: Jinzouko-Hen in Japan) (Japan, 1995; North America, 1996)
- Mark Davis Pro Bass Challenge (PlayStation 2, 2003; GameCube, 2005)

== See also ==
- Bass fishing
- Bass Anglers Sportsman Society
- Bassmaster Classic
- Fishing tournament
