= O'Neill Williams =

- Known for: Television and radio show host and producer
- Website: http://www.oneilloutside.com

O'Neill Williams, born in Atlanta in October 1943, is host of O'Neill Outside, an outdoor based television series on Fox Sports Sun, Fox Sports Southeast, Fox Sports Arizona, Pursuit Channel, HuntTV, Amazon Prime, Outdoor Action Network, Camo Crusade, Waypoint TV, GEN 7 Outdoors to 277,000,000 subscriber households weekly and "O'Neill Outside" radio broadcasts to 38 states via WSB Radio in Atlanta and is in syndication nationally via the 155 SB Nation affiliates. "O'Neill Outside" radio is the #1 outdoor based live radio talk show in the country.

== Biography ==
Raised in Atlanta, Georgia, Williams graduated from Emory University with a degree in economics. He is a member of the Sigma Chi fraternity and was awarded Significant Sigma Chi status in 2013, one of only 1500 Sigma Chi national members awarded such since the founding of the fraternity in 1935.

Williams has been a television fishing personality for 40 years with shows titled Fishing in Georgia, Southern Fishing, Reel Adventures, Adventures Afield and O'Neill Outside. Williams is a body builder and finished third in the Mr. Atlanta Bodybuilding Championship at age 43 in 1987. He was a Georgia All State High School Association baseball player at the shortstop position and set a modern-day high school career batting average of .567 which has stood unbroken for over 60 years. He's married to high school classmate, Gail (Williams) Williams, and have been married 56 years since June, 1965. They have two daughters, Amy Williams Johnson and Allison Williams Moravec, who are married and live in the same areas in Georgia, three grandchildren who also live locally. Williams' grandson, Travis Johnson, is co-host of both the television and radio shows and is a professional Whitetail Deer guide and cattleman in Oklahoma. Williams has one brother, Henry Otis (Hank) Nash, III, who resides in Porter, Indiana.

Williams also hosts O'Neill Outside Radio on WSB, which is broadcast to 38 states live every Saturday morning at 4AM to 6AM has a weekly audience of over 800,000 fishermen and hunters and is syndicated nationally via the 155 SB Nation Affiliates. It is the number one live outdoor based radio talk show in the USA.

Williams' biological father, Donald O'Neill Williams Sr, was an Army Air Corps fighter pilot and was killed in a training flight accident at age 21 when O'Neill Williams was 6 weeks old. When Williams was 3 years old, his mother, Margaret Turpin Williams, married Henry Otis Nash Jr, an Army Air Corps hero and veteran of 25 missions over Japan as a radio operator on a B-29 flying out of the islands of Iwo Jima and Tinian. Williams' parents died five months apart in 2014 at age 92 and 94.

Williams was inducted into the "Legends of the Outdoors" Hall of Fame in 2015, the International Game Fish Hall of Fame as Legendary Communicator 1991, the Georgia Hunting and Fishing Hall of Fame in 2015, National Freshwater Fishing Hall of Fame in 2016 and the Georgia Radio Hall of Fame in 2018.
