= Bill Schaadt =

American painter and fisherman (1923–1995)

William Edward Schaadt (April 3, 1923 – January 17, 1995) was an American artist, sign painter, collector and fly fisherman.

Schaadt was born on April 3, 1923, in San Francisco. He discovered fishing at an early age along the public piers of San Francisco Bay. He quickly became obsessed with the art of angling. In his late teens, Schaadt moved with his mother to the small vacation town of Monte Rio along California's Russian River.

During the post-war years along the Russian River, Schaadt built a reputation as a skilled fly fisherman. With his angling skills and quirky, elusive demeanor, he became the subject of countless classic fishing stories. From the 1950s to mid-1990s, he was regarded as one of the top fly fishermen in the country, if not the world.

An innovative user of shooting head fishing lines, Schaadt helped pioneer Chinook salmon fishing on California's Smith River. He was one of the first to use flies to catch saltwater fish, including striped bass and rock fish. He medaled in fishing contests 12 times over the course of 19 years, usually in the chinook salmon category, and reportedly "caught more big salmon and steelhead than any other man who ever lived."

Schaadt never married. He died of lung cancer on January 17, 1995, in Santa Rosa, California. He is buried in Calvary Catholic Cemetery in Santa Rosa.

== Recognition ==
In 1974, Schaadt was the focus of a Sports Illustrated article titled "The World's Best". He was also profiled in Field & Stream and Outdoor Life, amongst others.

Schaadt was featured in numerous books, including Trey Combs' Steelhead Fly Fishing and Russell Chatham's collection of short stories, The Angler's Coast.

Schaadt appeared in several films, including Myron Gregory's 1955 instructional film Chinook Salmon on the Fly and the 2009 Skinny Fist Productions documentary Rivers of a Lost Coast.

A book about him, I Know Bill Schaadt: Portrait of a Fly Fishing Legend, by Ben Taylor, was released in January 2014.
