= Peter Miller (angler) =

Peter Miller is a professional angler and three-time sailfish tournament world champion. Miller is the host of Bass 2 Billfish on the NBC Sports Network, which is in its 6th season. Miller has filmed Bass 2 Billfish in collaboration with the Make-A-Wish Foundation, including a two-part episode that premiered in January-February 2015. Other notable episodes of Bass 2 Billfish include a two-part episode filmed with the Florida Army National Guard, which premiered in February, 2015. Miller was chosen by Florida Governor Rick Scott to be part of the "Sportsman for Scott" Coalition which supports the rights of hunters and fishers in Florida.
