= Edwin Evers (fisherman) =

American bass fisherman (born 1974)

- Born: November 30, 1974 (age 50); Louisiana, Missouri, U.S.
- Occupation: Professional fisherman
- Organization(s): B.A.S.S. Elite, Major League Fishing
- Known for: Sport fishing
- Awards: 2016 B.A.S.S. Classic Champion; 2019 MLF REDCREST Champion

Edwin Evers (born November 30, 1974), is a professional bass fisherman from Talala, Oklahoma.

== Biography ==
Evers was born in Louisiana, Missouri on November 30, 1974, and his family moved to Texas. From there, they moved to Seneca, Illinois, where he attended high school. He played football for Southeastern Oklahoma State University Savage Storm as a defensive back. Evers graduated in 1997 with a degree in communication, and a double minor in Marketing and Business Management. He lives in Talala, Oklahoma with his wife and two children.

He was the 2016 Bassmaster Classic Champion with a total weigh in of 60lbs -7oz and took the cash winnings of $300,000 (US). As of March 2017, he has 11 wins in Bassmaster Professional Tournaments.

Evers is sponsored by several companies including Bass Pro Shops, Lowrance Electronics, Wiley X, and more.

== Career stats ==
- 1 REDCREST Title
- 1 Bassmaster Classic Titles
- Career winnings: more than $3,657,943
- Career Wins: 13
- Career Top Ten finishes: 74
- Times in the BASSMASTER Classic: 15
