= Jimmy Houston =

American angler and television host (born 1944)

Jimmy Houston (born July 28, 1944) is a pro angler and TV host. He was on ESPN for 21 years before he switched to the Outdoor Life Network. He is currently on NBC Sports. In 1990, he was inducted into the National Fresh Water Fishing Hall of Fame. He is known for his distinctive laugh. With fellow fishermen Roland Martin and Bill Dance, he formed the company Th3 Legends to sell signature products.

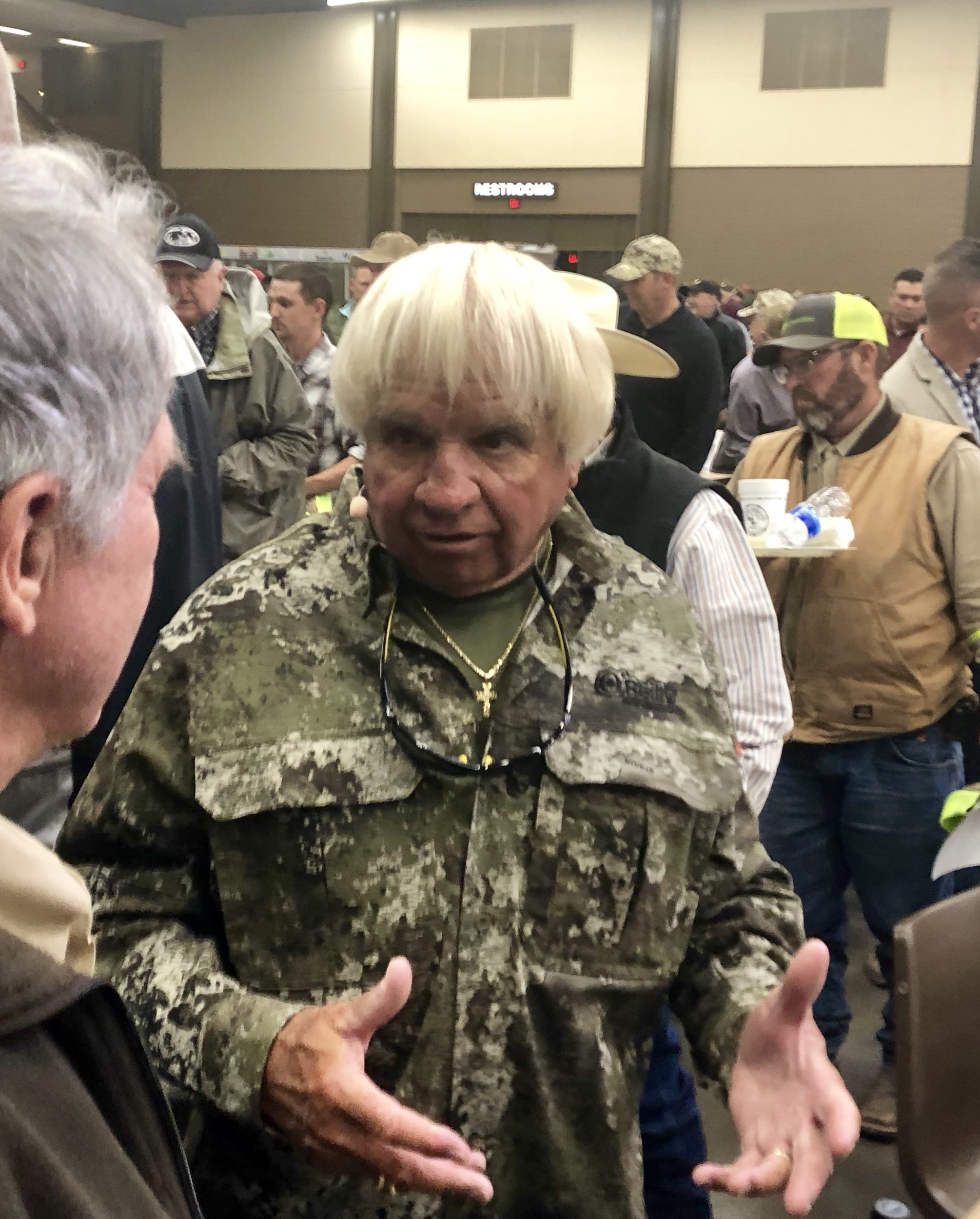
Houston on 10 May 2019 at the West Texas Beast Feast in Lubbock, Texas

Houston was born in San Marcos, Texas on July 28, 1944, and grew up in Moore, Oklahoma. He has written five books about his career with some of his faith sprinkled in. One of his books called Catch of The Day is a devotional that explains his love of Christ and shows how fishing works with it interchangeably.

== Tournament Fishing ==
Jimmy Houston spent years fishing in tournament leagues Bass Master and FLW.

=== Fishing League Worldwide ===
In the Fishing League Worldwide (FLW) he fished in 83 events and came out as a top 10 finisher 3 times. He has been a pro in the FLW for 13 years.

==== Bass Master ====
In Bass Master, he has been in 246 tournaments and appeared in 5 classics. He has not won any of the classics, but overall he has earned over 350,000 dollars fishing in Bass Master tourneys.

==== Television ====
He first appeared on TV in 1973 with John Fox, The American Angler.
