= Rick Clunn =

American fisherman

Rick Clunn (born July 24, 1946) is an American professional bass fisherman.

== Biography ==
Clunn was born July 24, 1946 in Missouri. He began fishing professionally in his 20's.

Clunn has won the Bassmaster Classic tournament four times, in 1976, 1977, 1984, and 1990, tying him with Kevin Van Dam for the most Bassmaster Classic wins. Clunn is considered one of the best anglers of all time, having placed in the top 10 in over 100 tournaments, and winning seventeen of those. In 1988, he was voted Angler of the Year by the B.A.S.S. organization. In 2001, he was inducted into the Bass Fishing Hall of Fame.

On February 12, 2019, Clunn beat his own record as the oldest angler to win a Bassmaster Elite Series event at 72 years old. On the final day of competition on the St. Johns River, Clunn caught two 9-plus pound largemouths to solidify his victory.

He first set the record on March 20, 2016 also on the St. Johns River. Clunn, won the tournament with a four-day total weight of 81 pounds, 15 ounces. With that win, he became the oldest person to ever win a Bassmaster tournament at 69, until breaking that record again in 2019. Clunn gained his victory with a near-record one day catch of 31 pounds, 7 ounces during Saturday's semifinal round.

Clunn has appeared on Comedy Central's The Daily Show, as well as in numerous fishing shows and bass magazines.

== Awards ==
Clunn has fished in 32 Bassmasters Classic Championships, and qualified for a record 28 years consecutively. He has won the B.A.S.S. National Championship 15 times. He has won at least $2.7 million (possibly $3.25 million) in professional tournament fishing. He is the FLW All-Time leading money-winner with $700,000 in winnings from that organization's events.

- 1976 Bassmasters Classic Champion
- 1977 Bassmasters Classic Champion
- 1983 U.S. Open Champion
- 1984 Bassmasters Classic Champion
- 1985 Redman All-American Champion
- 1986 U.S. Open Champion
- 1988 B.A.S.S. Angler of the Year
- 1990 Bassmasters Classic Champion
- FLW Champion Ross Barnett, Mississippi Feb. 1997.
- FLW Champion Beaver Lake, Arkansas April 2000.
- FLW Champion Pickwick, Alabama Lake June 2000.
- 2001 B.A.S.S. Mega-Bucks Champion.
- Inducted into the Bass Fishing Hall of Fame 2001.
- Inducted into the Freshwater Fishing Hall of Fame 2001.
- 2002 B.A.S.S. Central Open Sam Rayburn Champion.
- Won ESPN's Greatest Angler Debate in 2005.
- Inducted into the Missouri Sports Hall of Fame, January 2017.
- US man of the year

== See also ==
- List of American fishers
