= Larry Nixon =

Professional fisherman from Bee Branch, Arkansas

Larry Nixon aka The General
- Born: September 3, 1950 (age 75)
- Known for: Professional fisherman
- Spouse: Amy Britner
- Children: Lindsey; Beau; Christopher

Larry Nixon (born September 3, 1950) is a professional fisherman from Bee Branch, Arkansas.

== Career ==
He has competed in more than 260 bass fishing tournaments since 1977; still competing in bass fishing tournaments to this very day. Nixon has won fourteen first-place finishes in all the professional bass fishing events. He won the 1983 BASSMASTERS Classic held on the Ohio River near Cincinnati, Ohio. His catch there is the 3rd smallest winning weight in BASSMASTERS Classic history. He is also a 2-time B.A.S.S. Angler of The Year winner. Nixon was the first angler to earn $1 million in bass tournament winnings. Nixon's career earnings in his entire bass fishing career add up to a grand total of $1,634,858.60; making him a millionaire in the sport. His biggest fish caught to win the Big Bass award was a black bass weighing 6 pounds (2.7 kg) at Lake Dardanelle in Arkansas on August 12, 2009. At the 2004 FLW Tour in Lake Okeechobee (Florida), Nixon managed to catch 28 pounds (13 kg) worth of fish. This would become his largest catch of his entire career.

Larry Nixon endorsed a video game which was called Larry Nixon's Super Bass Fishing in Japan. The game was released on September 23, 1994. When it was released in the United States and Canada two months later, the game changed its title to TNN Bass Tournament of Champions in recognition of the former Nashville Network.
