= Luke Clausen =

American fisherman

Luke Clausen of the Spokane Valley is a professional fisherman. Clausen won the 36th Bassmaster Classic held on Lake Tohopekaliga in central Florida, from February 23–26, 2006.
