= Ray Scott (angler) =

American outdoorsman (1933–2022)

Ray Scott (1933 – May 8, 2022) was an American outdoorsman who founded the Bass Anglers Sportsman Society (B.A.S.S.) in 1967 after a vision of "building the sport of bass fishing to its rightful place in the first rank of American sports." As the "godfather" of modern bass fishing, he created the first national bass tournament trail (the Bassmaster Tournament Trail), Bassmaster Magazine, The Bassmasters television show and the BASS Federation. He was also well known for his contributions to conservation and boating safety.

He died of natural causes on May 8, 2022.

== Titles and honors ==
- 2003 Horatio Alger Award

== Books ==
- Bass Boss by Robert H. Boyle
- Prospecting and Selling From a Fishing Hole to a Pot of Gold by Ray Scott
