= Bass Anglers Sportsman Society =

Fishing membership organization

- Founded: 1967; 59 years ago in Montgomery, Alabama, U.S.
- Purpose: Sport fishing and nature conservation
- Headquarters: Birmingham, Alabama
- Region served: Worldwide, primarily United States
- Website: www.bassmaster.com

The Bass Anglers Sportsman Society (B.A.S.S.) is a fishing membership organization with more than a half a million members. It is geared toward bass fishermen, mainly in the United States but with members located worldwide. The society publishes Bassmaster magazine and other related publications, and also produces The Bassmasters weekly television program. B.A.S.S. is best known for the sport fishing tournament trails it conducts, and for its world championship event, the Bassmaster Classic. The society's logo is a blue shield with a leaping largemouth bass and the society's acronym.

The B.A.S.S. organization advances Sport Fishing through advocacy, outreach and an expansive tournament structure while connecting directly with the community of bass anglers through its media vehicles. B.A.S.S. is a tournament and membership organization serving more than 515,000 members.

== History ==
In 1967, Ray Scott of Montgomery, Alabama launched the concept of competitive bass fishing by forming the Bass Anglers Sportsman Society. In late 2010, Alabama businessmen Don Logan and Jim Copeland plus veteran broadcaster Jerry McKinnis formed an ownership group to purchase the organization from ESPN. In 2011, the new owners relocated B.A.S.S. headquarters from Celebration, Florida, to Birmingham, Alabama. In 2017 Anderson Media Corp., a 100-year-old family business founded in Ala., acquired a majority interest in B.A.S.S.

== All-time record book ==
Most B.A.S.S. tournaments won:

- 25, Kevin VanDam
- 19, Roland Martin
- 17, Denny Brauer
- 16, Rick Clunn
- 14, Larry Nixon

At the 2020 Toyota Bassmaster Texas Fest benefiting Texas Parks & Wildlife Department, winner and Bassmaster Elite Series angler Patrick Walters set a Bassmaster record for margin of victory by finishing 29 pounds, 10 ounces ahead of the second-place finisher.

== Angler of the Year Award ==
The Angler of the Year (AOY) award is given to the angler who, at the end of the season, has accumulated the most points throughout the year's "Elite Series" tournaments. Winners of the award:

- 1970 — Bill Dance
- 1971 — Roland Martin
- 1972 — Roland Martin
- 1973 — Roland Martin
- 1974 — Bill Dance
- 1975 — Roland Martin
- 1976 — Jimmy Houston
- 1977 — Bill Dance
- 1978 — Roland Martin
- 1979 — Roland Martin
- 1980 — Larry Nixon
- 1981 — Roland Martin
- 1982 — Larry Nixon
- 1983 — Hank Parker
- 1984 — Roland Martin
- 1985 — Roland Martin
- 1986 — Jimmy Houston
- 1987 — Denny Brauer
- 1988 — Rick Clunn
- 1989 — Gary Klein
- 1990 — Guido Hibdon
- 1991 — Guido Hibdon
- 1992 — Kevin VanDam
- 1993 — Gary Klein
- 1994 — David Fritts
- 1995 — Mark Davis
- 1996 — Kevin VanDam
- 1997 — Davy Hite
- 1998 — Mark Davis
- 1999 — Kevin VanDam
- 2000 — Tim Horton
- 2001 — Mark Davis
- 2002 — Davy Hite
- 2003 — Jay Yelas
- 2004 — Gerald Swindle
- 2005 — Aaron Martens
- 2006 — Michael Iaconelli
- 2007 — Skeet Reese
- 2008 — Kevin VanDam
- 2009 — Kevin VanDam
- 2010 — Kevin VanDam
- 2011 — Kevin VanDam
- 2012 — Brent Chapman
- 2013 — Aaron Martens
- 2014 — Greg Hackney
- 2015 — Aaron Martens
- 2016 — Gerald Swindle
- 2017 — Brandon Palaniuk
- 2018 — Justin Lucas
- 2019 — Scott Canterbury
- 2020 — Clark Wendlandt
- 2021 — Seth Feider
- 2022 — Brandon Palaniuk
- 2023 — Kyle Welcher
- 2024 — Chris Johnston
- 2025 — Chris Johnston
- 2026 — Trey McKinney

== Tournaments ==
The first ever B.A.S.S. Federation tournament was held in June 1967 on Beaver Lake, Arkansas. A total of 106 anglers from thirteen different states competed. In that All-American Bass Tournament, Scott charged a $100 entry fee with a chance to win $2,000 and a trip to Acapulco, Mexico. The winner of this first tournament was Stan Sloan.

Scott staged the first Bassmaster Classic in 1971 at Lake Mead, Nevada — though competitors didn't know the location until they were in an aircraft bound for Las Vegas. The "mystery lake" practice continued through 1976; the following year Scott announced the venue in advance so that fans could make plans to attend the event. Since then, the final weigh-in events, and fishing expositions held together with those events, have become huge spectator events filling large arenas and being broadcast live on FOX and FS1.

In 2021, all nine Bassmaster Elite events and the Bassmaster Classic were covered live on Fox Sports platforms and Fox Sports 1.

B.A.S.S conducts multiple tournaments and series:

=== Bassmaster Classic ===
The Bassmaster Classic is considered the "Super Bowl of Fishing". This world championship event is held once every year and has become a fan favorite. This tournament has a first place prize of $300,000 USD.

=== Bassmaster Elite Series ===
The series consists of a professional group of bass anglers competing for over $11 million in prizes throughout each season. This makes up bass fishing's highest paying competitive league. This series schedule runs from coast to coast through all phases of the seasons of bass fishing.

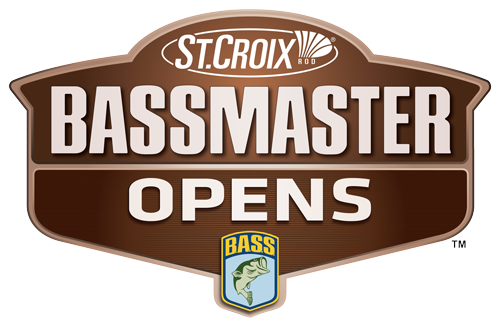

=== Bassmaster Opens ===
This series sets a platform for amateur anglers to emerge as aspiring pros. Both boaters and non-boaters compete in the Bassmaster Opens, which provides advancement to the Bassmaster Elite Series. Also, an automatic entry to the next years Bassmaster Classic is awarded to the winner of each Bassmaster Open event however in addition they must fish all three Open events in their division to qualify.

=== Bassmaster College Series ===
The Bassmaster College Series gives college anglers a platform where they can compete with their peers and get a taste of what it feels like to compete on a national level. The series pits teams of college anglers against one another for cash, prizes, bragging rights and a chance to compete in the Bassmaster Classic.

=== Women's Bassmaster Tour ===
This tour opened October 20, 2005 at Lake Lewisville in Dallas Texas and was presented by Triton and Legend Boats. The winner of each WBT took home a boat valued at $50,000. Australian born Kim Bain-Moore was the WBT's 2008 Angler of the Year as well as the end of season Championship winner. The tour was closed after the 2009 season won by Pam Martin Wells.

=== B.A.S.S. Nation ===
Formerly the B.A.S.S. Federation Nation, the name was changed to B.A.S.S. Nation at the beginning of the 2013 season. B.A.S.S. Nation is composed of bass tournament clubs throughout the country. They provide the opportunity for anglers to compete in bass tournaments at a local level as well as different state and national tournaments culminating in the opportunity to fish the Bassmaster Classic.
