= Fishing television series =

Genre of television programs

Fishing television series are a genre of television programs revolving around recreational and sport fishing. Shows usually share a similar format and features with hunting television shows, and could be considered a subgenre of sports television.

Programs range from educational television (most programs in the genre until recent years, which divulge advice), to sports television (many televised fishing competitions, such as Bassmasters), to reality television (such as FNC: Uncut, which shows the life of celebrity fishermen when the cameras aren't usually rolling), to game shows (such as fish-off Beat Charlie Moore:).

In 2005, the World Fishing Network launched, being a dedicated angling TV station.

In 2012, Queens of Camo was created to focus on the emerging trend of women, the fastest growing demographic, getting involved with the hunting and fishing industry.
