= Kevin VanDam =

American bass fisherman (born 1967)

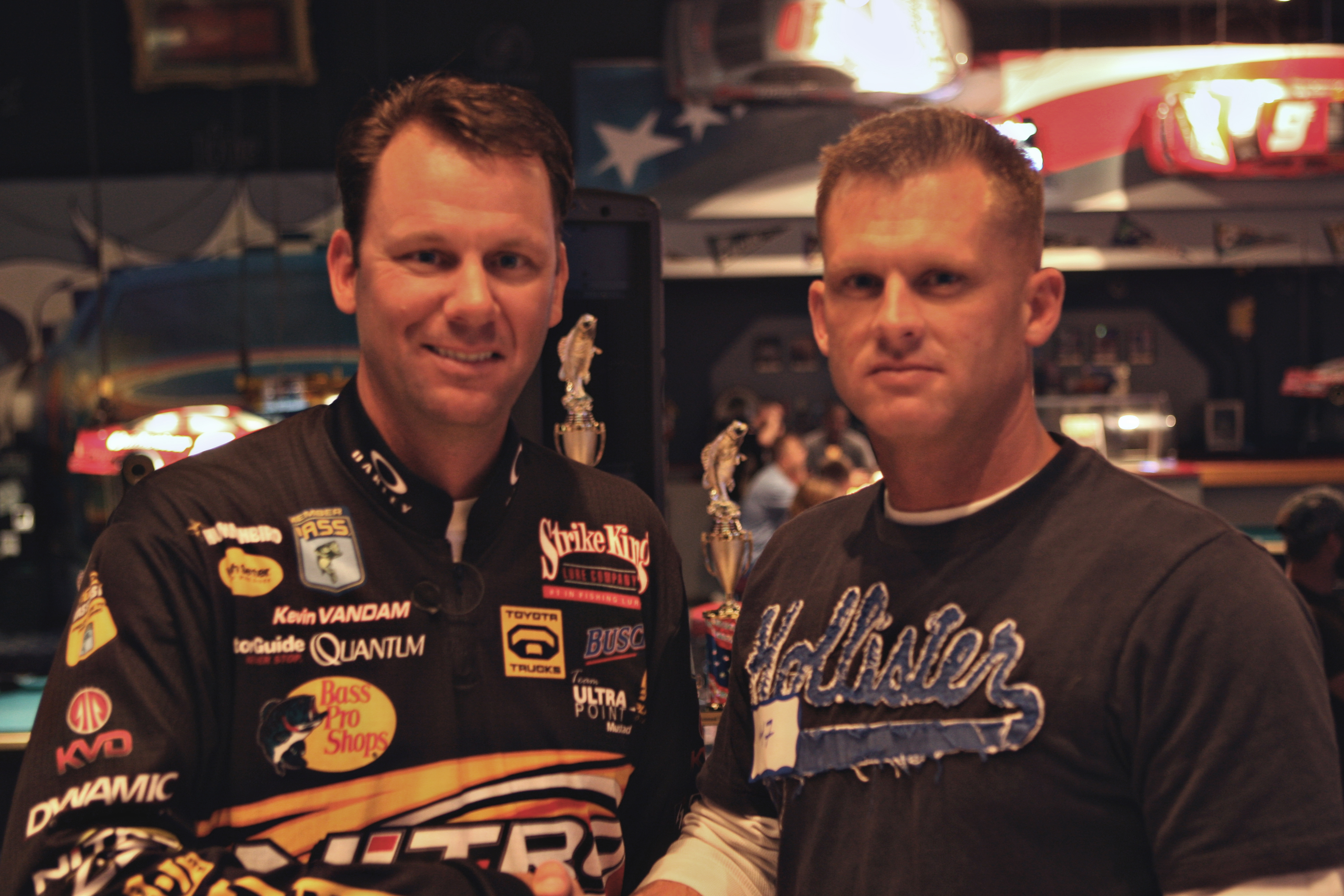
Kevin VanDam (L), with Anthony Ball, USMC, Warriors on the Water Bass Fishing Tournament, Lake Jordan, Raleigh, N.C., April 2010

Kevin VanDam (born October 14, 1967), often called simply "KVD," is a professional bass fisherman from Otsego, Michigan. He is the all-time money winner in professional bass fishing, having earned $7,089,388 through August 2022 according to Major League Fishing. He has captured four Bassmaster Classic titles (2001, 2005, 2010, 2011), seven Toyota Tundra Angler of Year titles (1992, ‘96, ‘99, ‘08, ‘09, '10, '11) and was also the FLW Angler of the Year in 2001. VanDam has predominantly fished the Bass Anglers Sportsman Society (BASS) Bassmasters tournament series during his career but was also a founding member of Major League Fishing.

== Career ==
VanDam began his career in 1990 at the age of 23. In 1992, he became the youngest person to win the BASS Angler of the Year title, at age 25. He and Rick Clunn are the only anglers to have won four Bassmaster Classic titles. His 25 career BASS tournament series wins are the most career wins on the Bassmasters tournament trail. His win of the Bassmaster Elite at Grand Lake on April 29, 2018, marked his 25th Elite Series victory. Vandam also has 111 top 10 finishes, 173 top 20 finishes, and 214 top 30 finishes through July 23, 2017. VanDam was honored with the first-ever Outdoorsman of the Year ESPY Award by ESPN in 2002.

VanDam is sponsored on the BASS Bassmasters tournament trail by Busch Beer, Nitro, Mercury Marine, Toyota, Strike King, Mustad, Plano, MinnKota, Lew's, Bass Pro Shops, Humminbird, Oakley, D&R Sports, Hydrowave, and RMR Industries.

In February 2023 VanDam announced his intention to retire from tournament fishing at the end of the 2023 Bass Pro Tour season.

=== Stats ===
- 3 Major League Fishing Cup
- 4 Bassmaster Classic Titles
- 8 Angler of the Year Titles ( 7 B.A.S.S., 1 FLW)
- Career winnings: more than $6,300,000 (B.A.S.S. and FLW)
- Career Top Ten finishes: 111
- Times in the BASSMASTER Classic: 26
- Tournaments Won: 25 (B.A.S.S.)
- Tournaments Runner-Up: 16

== Personal life ==
Born in Kalamazoo, Michigan, and graduated from Otsego High School, VanDam still resides there with his wife, Sherry, and sons Jackson and Nicholas.
