= Skeet Reese =

American fisherman

Skeet Reese is an American professional sport fisherman of the Bass Anglers Sportsman Society (B.A.S.S.) and Major League Fishing. He was born in Walnut Creek, California on June 30, 1969. He has a wife, Kim, and a two daughters, Leamarie and Courtney. Reese is one of the primary spokesmen for General Tire.

On September 15, 2007, Skeet became the 2007 B.A.S.S. Toyota Tundra Angler of the Year.

Skeet won the 2009 Bassmaster Classic in Shreveport, LA, on February 22, 2009, with a total weight of 54 pounds 13 ounces.

== Stats ==
- Years pro: 14
- Top 10 finishes: 59
- First place finishes: 6
- Second place finishes: 10
- Career earnings: $2,545,553.64
- Current World rank: 14
- Current Bassmaster standing: 2 (295 points)
- Total Weight: 5,846 lbs 10oz
- 2007 B.A.S.S. Toyota Tundra Angler of the year
- Best finish in 2006: 2 - Potomac River, 8/10/2006
- Best finish in 2007: 2 - Lay Lake, 2/23/2007
- Best finish in 2008: 9 - Clarks Hill, 5/1/2008
- Best finish in 2009: 1 - Red River, 2/22/2009
- Best finish in 2010: 1 - Smith Mountain Lake, 4/19/2010
- Bassmaster Classics: 11 (fished)
- Bassmaster Classic Titles: 1

== Angler Information ==
- Home Lake: Clear Lake (CA)
- Favorite Lake: Clear Lake (CA) - "It's a phenomenal fishery, but Lake Champlain comes pretty close."
- Least Favorite Lake: Lake Toho (FL) - "I just can't figure the fish out there."
- Favorite Technique: Flipping and pitching
- Primary Fishing Strength: Mental toughness
- Secondary Fishing Strength: Flipping and pitching
- Biggest Weakness: Cranking deep structure
- Boat: RANGER
- Motor: Mercury
- Team: Lucky Craft
- Fishing Sponsors: Lowrance, MotorGuide, Lucky Craft, Berkley Trilene, Abu Garcia, Fish Hedz, Wiley X
