= Bill Dance (television host) =

American fisherman and television host

- Born: William George Dance, Jr. October 7, 1940 (age 85)
- Known for: Professional fisherman, television host, author
- Spouse: Dianne
- Children: Bill, Jr; Paul; Patrick; Pamela
- Website: http://www.billdanceoutdoors.com

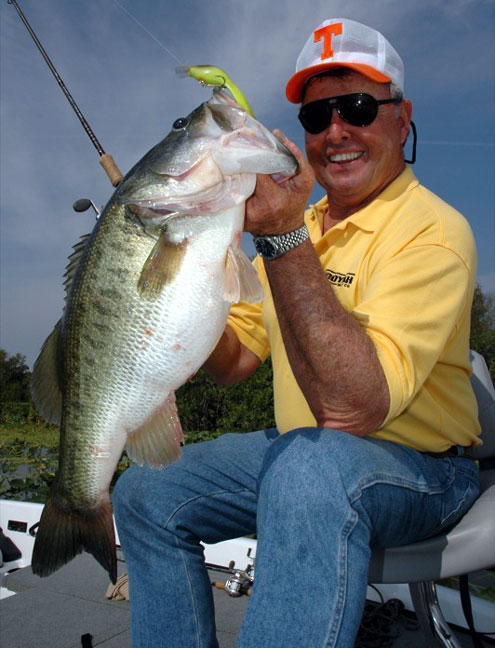

William George Dance, Jr. (born October 7, 1940) is an angler and host of Bill Dance Outdoors, a fishing television series on the Outdoor Channel, and Bill Dance Saltwater on the Sportsman Channel.

== Biography ==
Raised in Lynchburg, Tennessee, Dance considered becoming a doctor, but changed his mind after happening upon a grisly motorcycle accident in the early 1960s. He then turned his focus to competing in bass tournaments. A fishing lure manufacturer that sponsored him suggested he should start a TV show to promote the product. The program originally began on WHBQ-TV, then the ABC affiliate in Memphis, in 1968.

Dance's signature look includes sunglasses and a Tennessee Volunteers baseball cap. He received his first cap from their coach, Doug Dickey, in the late 1960s. He lives in Eads, with his wife, Dianne.

== Achievements ==
- International Game Fish Association's Hall of Fame
- 1970, 1974, 1977: B.A.S.S. Angler of the Year.
- 23 National Bass Fishing titles and 7 B.A.S.S. titles.
- Caught first bass in B.A.S.S. history.
- 1986: National Freshwater Hall of Fame.
