= Bassmaster Classic =

Professional bass fishing tournament

The Bassmaster Classic (known as the Bass Pro Shops Bassmaster Classic for sponsorship reasons) is a tournament in the sport of professional bass fishing, organized by the Bass Anglers Sportsman Society. It was first held in 1971 on Lake Mead, Nevada. Originally it was a fall event, (1971-1983) but it switched to a summer event in 1984 and then a late winter event in 2006.

Rick Clunn and Kevin VanDam have each won the event four times. Jordan Lee, Bobby Murray, Hank Parker, George Cochran and Hank Cherry have each won twice. First-place money has grown from $10,000 in 1971 to $500,000 in 2006; it was reduced to $300,000 in 2014.

== History ==
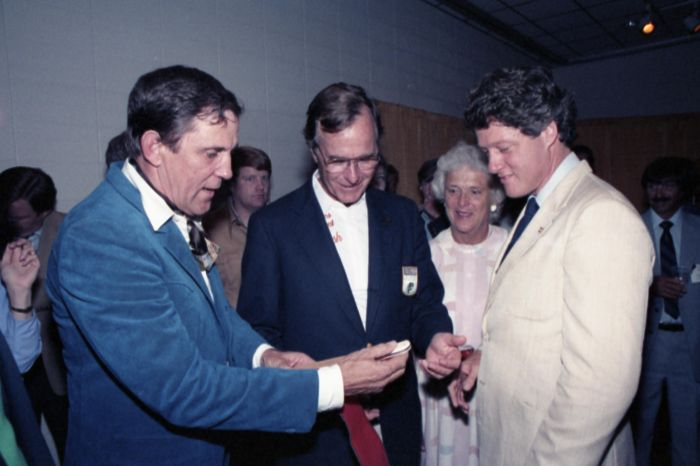
Bassmaster Classic-founder Ray Scott (left), Vice President George H. W. Bush (second from left), Second Lady Barbara Bush (third from left), and Arkansas Governor Bill Clinton (far right) at the 1984 Bassmaster Classic

In 1968, Ray Scott officially formed and incorporated the Bass Anglers Sportsman Society (B.A.S.S.). Don Butler from Oklahoma was the first B.A.S.S. member after paying Ray Scott $100 for a lifetime membership. The first ever Bassmaster Magazine would also be published in the same year.

== Rules and procedures ==
The field has ranged from 24 to 61 anglers. The 2009 competition included women for the first time. 2010 was the last year for women to be given a specific Classic spot. As in previous years, they now have to earn a spot via the Opens or, qualify for the Bassmaster Elite Series and have enough success to gain a spot to the Classic. The Bassmaster College Series, B.A.S.S. Nation and the Team Championship also offer paths to the Classic.

The Bassmaster Classic takes place over three days. All fish are caught under catch-and-release rules, must measure at least 12 inches (or as that state law requires), and must be alive at the time they are presented for weigh-in or a penalty will be assessed. There is a cut after the second day, in which only the 25 top anglers, based on total weight, advance to the third day. The highest total weight after three days wins the competition.

Contestants can only fish in specified areas at the competition venue. Usually, this a lake but the 1980 Classic was held on the Saint Lawrence River in Alexandria Bay, New York. The 2005 competition was held at Three Rivers (Allegheny River and Monongahela River which forms the Ohio River) in Pittsburgh, with some competitors using tributaries including the Beaver River and Youghiogheny River miles from the confluence. In 2009 and 2012 the Classic used a 100-mile stretch of the Red River in Shreveport, Louisiana. In 2011, the Classic was held on the Louisiana Delta. The Classic venue continues to change from year to year, but tends to revisit prior Classic sites as well.

From its inception to 1976, the Classic was held at a "mystery lake," unknown to competitors until they were aboard an aircraft bound for the site. Founder Ray Scott changed the practice for the 1977 Classic, announcing the site in advance so that fans of the sport could plan ahead to attend.

== Forward Facing Sonar ==
The debate of forward facing sonar has been a controversial topic since its introduction. Up until 2015, anglers would have to use traditional sonar, local charts, and traditional fishing methods such as 'flippin' and pitching to locate and catch fish.

In 2021, forward facing sonar was used in the Bassmaster Classic for the first time.

Before the 2025 season, B.A.S.S was pressured into making a decision on the application of forward facing sonar. On September 4th, B.A.S.S released a statement explaining that it would not be banned. Instead, all anglers participating in the Bassmaster Elite Series and contenders for the Bass Pro Shops Bassmaster Classic, would be forced to follow equipment standardization rules. These rules would implement significant guidelines on what and how much technology can be used in the event.

== Past editions ==
Year	Edition	Champion	Weight lbs oz	Boat	Main body of water	Host town/city	Weigh-in venue	Takeoff (launch) location	Outdoors Expo venue	Date
1971	I	(United States) Bobby Murray	43-11	Rebel	Lake Mead, NV	(Note: competitors were hosted at the Union Plaza Hotel and Casino in Las Vegas)	—N/a	—N/a	—N/a	Oct 20-22
1972	II	(United States) Don Butler	38-11	Ranger	Percy Priest Reservoir, TN	(Note: the event was held at a "mystery lake", with competitors not knowing its location until being brought there)	—N/a	—N/a	—N/a	Oct 25-27
1973	III	(United States) Rayo Breckenridge	52-8	BassCat	Clarks Hill Lake, SC	(Note: lake was located in McCormick, South Carolina)	—N/a	—N/a	—N/a	Oct 24-26
1974	IV	(United States) Tommy Martin	33-7	BassCat	Wheeler Lake, AL				—N/a	Oct 30 - Nov 1
1975	V	(United States) Jack Hains	45-4	Ranger	Currituck Sound, NC				—N/a	Oct 29-31
1976	VI	(United States) Rick Clunn	59-15	Ranger	Lake Guntersville, AL				—N/a	Nov 3-5
1977	VII	(United States) Rick Clunn	27-7	Ranger	Kissimmee Chain, FL				—N/a	Oct 26-28
1978	VIII	(United States) Bobby Murray	37-9	Ranger	Ross Barnett Reservoir, MS				—N/a	Oct 25-27
1979	IX	(United States) Hank Parker	31-0	Ranger	Lake Texoma, TX				—N/a	Sep 26-28
1980	X	(United States) Bo Dowden	54-10	Ranger	St. Lawrence River, NY	Alexandria Bay			—N/a	Sep 24-26
1981	XI	(United States) Stanley Mitchell	35-2	Ranger	Alabama River, AL	Montgomery	Montgomery Civic Center		Montgomery Civic Center South Hall	Oct 15-17
1982	XII	(United States) Paul Elias	32-8	Ranger	Alabama River, AL	Montgomery	Montgomery Civic Center		Montgomery Civic Center South Hall	Oct 14-16
1983	XIII	(United States) Larry Nixon	18-1	Ranger	Ohio River, OH	Cincinnati				Aug 4-5
1984	XIV	(United States) Rick Clunn	75-9	Ranger	Arkansas River, AR					Aug 16-18
1985	XV	(United States) Jack Chancellor	45-0	Ranger	Arkansas River, AR					Aug 15-17
1986	XVI	(United States) Charlie Reed	23-9	Ranger	Tennessee River, TN					Aug 14-16
1987	XVII	(United States) George Cochran	15-5	Ranger	Ohio River, KY	Louisville				Aug 13-15
1988	XVIII	(United States) Guido Hibdon	28-8	Ranger	James River, VA	Richmond	Richmond Coliseum			Aug 25-27
1989	XVIV	(United States) Hank Parker	31-6	Ranger	James River, VA	Richmond	Richmond Coliseum			Aug 17-19
1990	XV	(United States) Rick Clunn	34-5	Ranger	James River, VA	Richmond	Richmond Coliseum			Aug 23-25
1991	XVI	(United States) Ken Cook	33-2	Ranger	Chesapeake Bay, MD					Aug 22-24
1992	XVII	(United States) Robert Hamilton, Jr	59-6	Ranger	Lake Logan Martin, AL					Jul 30 - Aug 1
1993	XVIII	(United States) David Fritts	48-6	Ranger	Lake Logan Martin, AL					Aug 12-14
1994	XVIV	(United States) Bryan Kerchal	36-7	Ranger	High Rock Lake, NC					Jul 28-30
1995	XVV	(United States) Mark Davis	47-14	Ranger	High Rock Lake, NC					Aug 3-5
1996	XVI	(United States) George Cochran	31-14	Ranger	Lay Lake, AL					Aug 8-10
1997	XVII	(United States) Dion Hibdon	34-13	Ranger	Lake Logan Martin, AL					Aug 7-9
1998	XVIII	(United States) Denny Brauer	46-3	Ranger	High Rock Lake, NC					Aug 6-8
1999	XXIV	(United States) Davy Hite	55-10	Ranger	Louisiana Delta, LA	New Orleans	Louisiana Superdome			Jul 29-31
2000	XXX	(United States) Woo Daves	27-13	Ranger	Lake Michigan, IL	Chicago	Soldier Field	Burnham Harbor	McCormick Place	Jul 20-22
2001	XXXI	(United States) Kevin VanDam	32-5	Triton	Louisiana Delta, LA	New Orleans	Louisiana Superdome			Aug 2-4
2002	XXXII	(United States) Jay Yelas	45-13	Skeeter	Lay Lake, AL					Jul 25-27
2003	XXXIII	(United States) Michael Iaconelli	37-14	Triton	Louisiana Delta, LA	New Orleans	Louisiana Superdome			Aug 1-3
2004	XXXXIV	(Japan) Takahiro Omori	39-2	Triton	Lake Wylie, NC					Jul 31 - Aug 1
2005	XXXXV	(United States) Kevin VanDam	12-15	Nitro	Three Rivers, PA					Jul 29-31
2006	XXXXVI	(United States) Luke Clausen	56-2	Triton	Kissimmee Chain, FL					Feb 24-26
2007	XXXXVII	(United States) Boyd Duckett	48-10	Triton	Lay Lake, AL					Feb 23-25
2008	XXXXVIII	(United States) Alton Jones	48-7	Skeeter	Lake Hartwell, SC					Feb 22-24
2009	XIL	(United States) Skeet Reese	54-13	Champion	Red River, LA	Shreveport-Bossier City				Feb 20-22
2010	XL	(United States) Kevin VanDam	51-6	Nitro	Lay Lake, AL	Birmingham				Feb 19-21
2011	XLI	(United States) Kevin VanDam	69-11	Nitro	Louisiana Delta, LA	New Orleans	Louisiana Superdome			Feb 18-20
2012	XLII	(United States) Chris Lane	51-6	Legend	Red River, LA					Feb 24-26
2013	XLIII	(United States) Cliff Pace	54-12	Skeeter	Grand Lake, OK					Feb 22-24
2014	XLIV	(United States) Randy Howell	67-8	Triton	Lake Guntersville, AL					Feb 21-23
2015	XLV	(United States) Casey Ashley	50-1	Triton	Lake Hartwell, SC					Feb 20-22
2016	XVLI	(United States) Edwin Evers	60-7	Nitro	Grand Lake, OK					Mar 4-6
2017	XLVII	(United States) Jordan Lee	56-10	Legend	Lake Conroe, TX	Houston	Minute Maid Park		George R. Brown Convention Center	Mar 24-26
2018	XLVIII	(United States) Jordan Lee	47-1	Ranger	Lake Hartwell, SC	Greenville	Bon Secours Wellness Arena	Green Pond Landing and Event Center (in Anderson, SC)	TD Convention Center	Mar 16-18
2019	49th	(United States) Ott Defoe	49-3	Nitro	Tennessee River, TN					Mar 15-17
2020	50th	(United States) Hank Cherry	65-5	BassCat	Lake Guntersville, AL					Mar 6-8
2021	51st	(United States) Hank Cherry	50-15	BassCat	Lake Ray Roberts, TX	Fort Worth				Jun 11-13
2022	52nd	(United States) Jason Christie	54-0	Xpress	Lake Hartwell, SC	Greenville	Bon Secours Wellness Arena	Green Pond Landing and Event Center (in Anderson, SC)	Greenville Convention Center	Mar 4-6
2023	53rd	(Canada) Jeff Gustafson	42-7	Lund	Tennessee River, TN	Knoxville	Thompson–Boling Arena	Volunteer Landing	Knoxville Convention Center	Mar 24-26
2024	54th	(United States) Justin Hamner	58-3	Falcon	Grand Lake, OK	Tulsa	BOK Center	Wolf Creek Park	Cox Business Convention Center	Mar 22-24
2025	55th	(United States) Easton Fothergill	76-15	Skeeter	Lake Ray Roberts, TX	Fort Worth	Dickies Arena	Ray Roberts Lake State Park Du Bois Unit (in Pilot Point, TX)	Fort Worth Convention Center	Mar 21-23
2026	56th	(United States) Dylan Nutt	66-13	Caymus	Tennessee River, TN	Knoxville	Thompson–Boling Arena	Volunteer Landing	Knoxville Convention Center	Mar 13-15

== Record Book ==
- Largest Bass Caught: 11-10, Preston Clark, Toho, Florida, 2006
- Heaviest Venue Total Weight: 76-15, Easton Fothergill, Lake Ray Roberts, Texas, 2025
- Heaviest Total Weight: 76-15, Easton Fothergill, Lake Ray Roberts, Fort Worth, Texas, 2025
- Lowest Total Winning Weight: 12-15. Kevin Van Dam, Three Rivers, Pennsylvania, 2005
- Heaviest Single Day Weight: 32-3, Paul Mueller, Guntersville, Alabama, 2014
- Most Bassmaster Classic Wins: 4, Rick Clunn, 1976, 1977, 1984, 1990 / 4, Kevin VanDam, 2001, 2005, 2010, 2011
- Most Top 5 Classic Finishes: 11, Rick Clunn
- Most Consecutive Classic Appearances: 28, Rick Clunn, 1974-2001
- Most Second Place Finishes: 4, Aaron Martens, 2002, 2004, 2005, 2011
- Largest Final Day Comeback: 13-14 deficit, Jordan Lee, Conroe, Texas, 2017

== Video game ==
A video game based on the tournament series, titled Bassmaster Fishing 2022, was released on October 28, 2021 for the PlayStation 4, PlayStation 5, Xbox One, Xbox Series X and Series S, Nintendo Switch, Steam and Epic Game Store. It was developed and published by Dovetail Games.
