= Berkley (fishing) =

American fishing tackle brand

- Type: Brand
- Industry: Fishing tackle
- Founded: 1937
- Founder: Berkley Bedell
- Headquarters: Columbia, South Carolina
- Area served: Worldwide
- Products: Fishing lines, rods, reels, lures, soft plastics, baits
- Parent: Pure Fishing (owned by Sycamore Partners)
- Website: www.berkley-fishing.com

Berkley is a fishing tackle brand that was founded in Spirit Lake, Iowa, in 1937 by Berkley Bedell as the Berkley Fly Co. when he was only 16 years old. Today, it is part of Pure Fishing, a subsidiary of Sycamore Partners, which owns and manages the Berkley brand.

== History ==
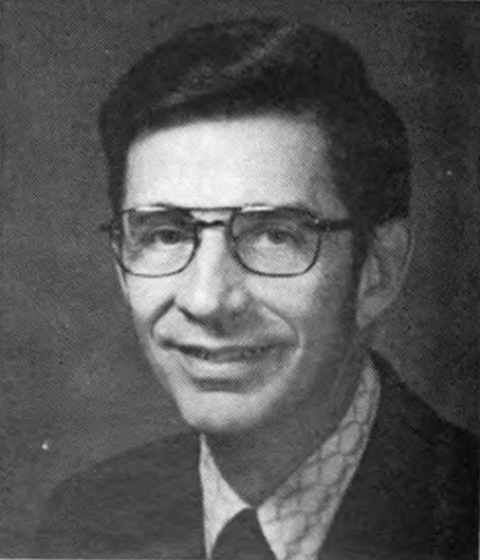
Berkley Bedell, founder of Berkley Fly Co.

Berkley Bedell founded the Berkley Fly Company, in 1937 while still in high school and during the Great Depression. He started with selling hand‑tied fishing flies made with material such as dog hair and chicken feathers to local tackle shops. His brother, Jack Bedell was his first employee, and his small student operation later employed other students and expanded to other tackle products including wire leaders.

After serving in the United States Army Air Corps during World War II, Bedell formally established the Berkley & Company in 1945, which initially produced nylon-coated wire leaders. The company later introduced Trilene monofilament fishing line in 1959, then diversified into fishing rods during the 1960s, and started selling to international markets by the 1970s. After Berkley Bedell was elected to the U.S. House of Congress in 1974, he handed leadership of the company to his son, Tom Bedell. In 1988, the company was renamed Outdoor Technologies Group, and finally as Pure Fishing in 2000.

Despite changes in ownership, the Berkley brand remained unchanged. The parent company owning Berkley was acquired by Jarden Corporation in April 2007. Jarden Corporation later merged with Newell Rubbermaid, and the Berkley brand became part of Newell Brands in 2018. In January 2019, Newell sold Pure Fishing to Sycamore Partners, who now owns the Berkley brand.
