= Bass fishing =

Recreational activity targeting North American black bass species

Smallmouth bass caught on the Missouri River in Niobrara, Nebraska

Bass fishing is the recreational fishing activity, typically via rod-based angling, for various North American freshwater game fishes known collectively as black bass. There are numerous black bass species targeted in North America, including largemouth bass (Micropterus nigricans), Florida Bass (Micropterus salmonides), smallmouth bass (Micropterus dolomieui), spotted bass or Kentucky bass (Micropterus punctulatus), and Guadalupe bass (Micropterus treculii). All black bass species are members of the sunfish family Centrarchidae.

Modern bass fishing has evolved into a multibillion-dollar industry. The sport of bass fishing has changed drastically since its beginnings in the late 19th century. From humble beginnings, the black bass has become the most specifically sought-after sport fish in the United States. The sport has driven the development of all manner of fishing gear in the market including rods, reels, lines, lures, electronic depth and fish-finding instruments, drift boats, float tubes, kayaks and also motor boats made specifically for bass fishing (colloquially called bass boats). Bass fishing commonly involves the use of artificial lures, such as plastic worms, crankbaits, and spinnerbaits, which are designed to mimic natural prey and attract fish.

== Black bass ==
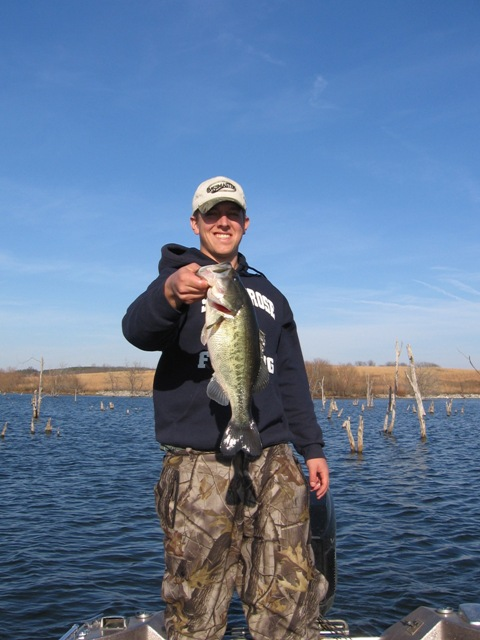
Largemouth bass caught by an angler in Iowa

All black bass are fished recreationally and are well known as strong fighters when hooked. Depending upon species and various other factors such as water quality and availability of food, black bass may be found in lakes, reservoirs, ponds, rivers, streams, creeks, and even roadside ditches. Anglers often target bass along shorelines, especially near structures such as rocks, vegetation, and docks where bass tend to feed and seek cover. Largemouth are known for their greater overall size and tolerance of urban environments, and also tend to jump more than other black bass and fight aggressively near the surface. However, smallmouth bass tend to fight even more aggressively when hooked, favoring extremely powerful runs to underwater structures such as submerged logs, weed beds, and rock piles. The All-Tackle world record Black Bass was a largemouth that was caught at Montgomery Lake, Georgia by George Perry, weighing in at 22 lbs. 4 oz. Perry's record fish, which some consider the "Holy Grail" of all freshwater sport fishing records, was finally challenged by Japanese angler Manabu Kurita on July 22, 2009. Kurita's catch was officially certified by the IGFA, weighing 22 lbs. 4 oz, the same weight as Perry's legendary catch. There are also several stories of fish that may have exceeded this record weight, but only these two were officially certified. Perry and Kurita have shared the All-Take world record since 2009.

All black bass rely heavily on scent to forage, so care should be taken when fishing to ensure no foreign scents like outdoor chemicals including sun block and bug spray, or any personal chemicals like tobacco, will deter the black bass. It is also important to wash hands frequently when handling fishing line, reels, rods, artificial baits, and particularly soft plastics. The flesh of smaller specimens is often white and flaky, with a mild, more pleasant taste when cooked.

== Background ==
Bass fishing in the United States largely evolved on its own, and was not influenced by angling developments in Europe or other parts of the world. Indeed, modern British sea bass fishermen look to the United States freshwater bass techniques for inspiration for lure fishing and to the U.S., Japan and China for tackle. During the early-to-mid-19th century, wealthy sport anglers in the United States (mostly located in the northeastern portion of the country) largely confined themselves to trout and salmon fishing using fly rods. While smallmouth bass were sought by some fly fishermen, most bass fishing was done by sustenance anglers using poles and live bait. The working-class heritage of bass fishing strongly influenced the sport and is manifested even today in its terminology, hobbyist literature, and media coverage. Many people who began fishing for bass a long time ago simply used a long stick, with some sort of line, tied to a hook, and normally used live bait. Early bass fishing methods were simple and often involved basic rods, live bait, and minimal equipment, reflecting the sport’s origins among everyday anglers.

In the mid-19th century, the first artificial lure used for bass was developed in the form of an artificial fly. At first, these artificial fly patterns were largely derivations of existing trout and salmon flies. As time went on, new fly patterns were specifically developed to fish for bass, as well as heavier spinner/fly lures that could be cast by the baitcasting and fixed-spool casting reels and rods available at the time. Floating wooden lures (plugs) or poppers of lightweight cork or balsa were introduced around 1900, sometimes combined with hooks dressed with artificial fur or feathers. Production of the plastic worm began in 1949, but it was not until the 1960s that its use became popular. The plastic worm revolutionized the sport of bass fishing.

In the U.S., the sport of bass fishing was greatly advanced by the stocking of largemouth and smallmouth bass outside their native ranges in the latter portion of the 19th century. As the nation's railroad system expanded, large numbers of 'tank' ponds were built by damming various small creeks that intersected the tracks to provide water for steam engines; later, new towns often sprang up alongside these water stops. Shippers discovered that black bass were a hardy species which could be transported in buckets or barrels via the railroad, sometimes using the spigot from the railroad water tank to aerate the fingerlings.

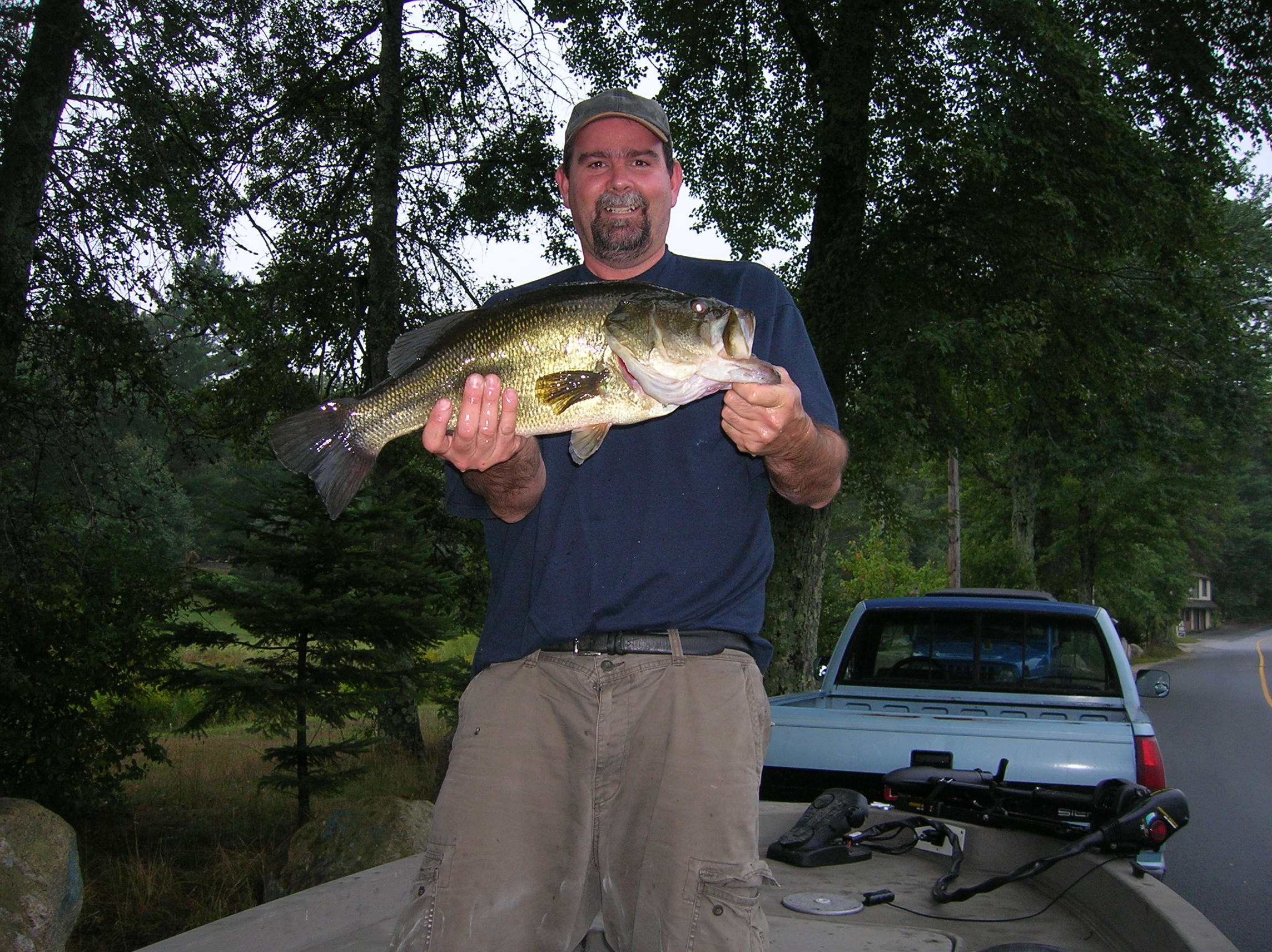
Largemouth bass caught by a Connecticut angler

Largemouth bass were often stocked in tank ponds and warmer lakes, while smallmouth bass were distributed to lakes and rivers throughout the northern and western United States, as far west as California. Smallmouth were transplanted east of the Appalachians just before the Civil War, and afterwards introduced into New England. Largemouth bass populations boomed after the U.S. Department of Agriculture began to advise and assist farmers in constructing and stocking farm ponds with largemouth bass, even offering advice on managing various fish species. Soon, those who had stocked largemouth bass on their farm ponds began to pursue them on a burgeoning number of new reservoirs and impoundments built in the United States during the 1940s and 1950s. The impoundments coincided with a postwar fishing boom, additional funds from sales of fishing licenses for the first large-scale attempts at bass fisheries management. That was especially true in the southern U.S., where the largemouth bass thrived in waters too warm or turbid for other types of game fish.

With increased industrialization and development, many of the nation's eastern trout rivers were dammed, polluted, or allowed to silt up, raising water temperatures and killing off the native brook trout. Smallmouth bass were often introduced to northern rivers now too warm for native trout, and slowly became a popular gamefish with many anglers. Equally adaptable to large, cool-water impoundments and reservoirs, the smallmouth also spread far beyond its original native range. Later, smallmouth populations also began to decline after years of damage caused by overdevelopment and industrial and agricultural pollution, as well as a loss of river habitat caused by damming many formerly wild rivers to form lakes or reservoirs. In recent years, a renewed emphasis on preserving water quality and riparian habitat in the nation's rivers and lakes, together with stricter management practices, eventually benefited smallmouth populations and has caused a resurgence in their popularity with anglers.

== Rise of modern bass fishing ==
An example of a very young specimen of largemouth bass caught by a fisherman in Minnesota

By the early 20th century, bass fishing had been well established as a sport with its own following. Though the use of artificial lures for bass had begun with the artificial fly and fly fishing tackle, the bait casting rod and reel soon came to dominate the sport. Although fixed-spool reels were introduced in use in the United States as early as the 1870s, spinning reels and rods did not gain wide acceptance as an angling tool until the 1950s. Since that time, most bass anglers have used bait casting or spinning tackle, using either artificial lures or live bait (See fishing rod, fishing reel).

During the 1950s and 1960s, the development of specific angling tools for bass significantly increased angler bass catches and helped stimulate the development of the sport. Some of these innovations include the invention of monofilament nylon fishing lines, the fiberglass (later graphite composite) fishing rod, the electric trolling motor, the fish finder/depth locator, and new artificial lures and baits made of various plastics. Recently, advanced electronics that mimic the sounds of schooling bait fish have been introduced, and a controversy has arisen over the proper use of these devices in bass tournament fishing. Advances in fishing technology and equipment have significantly improved anglers’ ability to locate and catch bass, contributing to the growth of the sport.

Since the early 1990s, fly fishing for bass, particularly smallmouth bass, has again become popular, using fly patterns, rods, and fly lines suited for bass. The largemouth bass is the most common sport fish in America. Many people are unaware that fly fishing is a growing source of bass catching, specifically in places where trophy bass are available like Southern California and San Diego. Here prime Florida largemouth are some of the largest in the world and some of the toughest to catch. Several well known bass fishermen have been attracting attention to the fishery. Local fly shops offer services to pursue the fish which can be challenging. There are several very well known bass lakes here including Lake Dixon, Lake Jennings, Miramar Reservoir, and Lake Murray, California.

Fishermen, conservation groups, and governmental wildlife departments have introduced black bass of various species across the world for the sport of fishing. Outside of North America, Japan and South Africa have active programs. Bass fishing as a sport was helped along by the chase for the standing world record which has held for over 75 years. Though surrounded by controversy it is widely accepted that in 1932 a 22-pound 4 ounce bass was caught by George Perry in Montgomery Lake, Georgia. It is one of the longest standing records in the sport of fishing. This record was tied on July 2, 2009 when Manabu Kurita of Aichi, Japan caught a 22-pound 5 ounce largemouth bass in Lake Biwa.

Black bass management is complex and involves various survey techniques to collect data. This date is then anaylzed to determine the best regulations (size limits, creel limits, etc.) to maintain healthy bass population. Since its inception in the 1970's, the catch-and-release ethic has become the standard for most black bass anglers. It has been so widely accepted that harvest rates for black bass in most Alabama reservoirs are less than 5%. However, traditional black bass tournaments are an exception. They typically require competitors to retain their catch for a live weigh-in at the conclusion of the event. These bass are usually released following the event, often with live release rates approaching 100%. Most competitors and tournament organizers make a valiant effort to ensure that these bass remain healthy while in their care. Unfortunately, an exhaustive list of scientific studies has shown that this does not adequately address the long-term mortality caused by the stress of confinement, handling, livewell agitation, excessive water temperatures, poor water quality, and disease transmission. Even with excellent fish care protocols, mortality in the days following an event can range from 30% - 80%, depending on the predominant species and water temperature. Because the largest fish are being targeted, the size-structure of the population is often affected. With that in mind competitive bass fishing tournaments should utilize catch-weigh-release (CWR) or catch-measure-release (CMR) formats to minimize unnecessary mortality associated with competitive angling events. The formats are currently being used successfully by kayak anglers and other conservation-minded bass clubs. There are many manufacturers of scales, measuring boards, and software which are designed specifically for CWR or CMR.

== Other species ==
Black bass should not be confused with a multitude of unrelated fish species found around the world and called "bass", such as the butterfly peacock bass (Cichla ocellaris), speckled peacock bass (Cichla temensis), Papuan black bass (Lutjanus goldiei) (also called Niugini bass), Australian bass, rock bass (Ambloplites rupestris), American striped bass, sand bass, and calico bass, white bass, and British sea bass (Dicentrarchus labrax).

== Competition ==
In 1955 Earl Golding of the Waco Tribune-Herald felt that it was time to put the "biggest fish tale" to the test and organized the first ever bass tournament on Lake Whitney in Texas. Golding began by inviting 75 teams and 73 competed. The Central Texas Invitational was such a success that it evolved into the Texas State Bass Tournament that is still held today. In 1967, Ray Scott founded the Bass Anglers Sportsman Society (B.A.S.S.). This organization brought bass fishing tournaments to the mainstream; starting clubs across the United States and holding invitation only tournaments for the best anglers.

Modern day bass fishing competitions can take on many forms depending on the tournament trail, but the most common format is each angler weighs their 5 best fish each day over a 1 to 4-day span. Competitors are penalized heavily for dead fish and in some cases dead fish are not weighed. Fish turned in for weighing are immediately released or placed in tanks, treated for stress and glyco-protein (slime coat) injury, and released back into the water.

However, a new tournament trail known as Major League Fishing emerged in 2019 with a new format – weighing in every fish over 1 pound and immediately releasing them. This caught the eye of many top professional anglers, leading to a mass exodus from B.A.S.S.

=== United States ===
There are several major bass fishing competitions in the United States, with the three most dominant circuits being Major League Fishing, Bassmasters and the FLW series.

- Major League Fishing is a new trail for 2019 and organized by Bass Pro Shops. The trail brought over professionals like Michael Iaconelli, Kevin VanDam, Aaron Martens, Cliff Pace and Luke Clausen.
- The Bassmaster Tournament Trail is organized by the Bass Anglers Sportsman Society (BASS) and was started by Ray Scott, the "father" of competitive bass fishing. There are a handful of events in which anglers compete for prizing over $100,000 and a chance to make Bassmaster Classic.
- The Walmart FLW Tour was named after Forrest L. Wood of Ranger Boats fame. The top prize of the Forrest Wood Cup is $1 million. Both tours are nationally televised on networks like ESPN and Fox Sports Net, and covered extensively by news media.
- American Bass Anglers (ABA), formerly the Military Bass Anglers Association, award National championship tournament winners with a Triton Bass boat and Championship ring among other prizes. Thomas Wayne Jones Sr., from Springfield, Tennessee won the 2007 ABA National championship.
- On the West Coast, WON BASS has been the main regional circuit in operation since the 1980s. Annually, WON BASS conducts the U.S. Open of Bass Fishing at Lake Mead, Nevada, which pays back nearly $500,000 per event. This is a test of both angling skill and endurance as the anglers compete for 3 days in the scorching hot sun and windy conditions of the Mojave Desert. Renowned anglers Rick Clunn, Byron Velvick, Aaron Martens, and Gary Klein have all been crowned champions during the Open's 25-year history.

==== High school ====
The state of Illinois was the first to make competitive bass fishing a state-sanctioned high school sport in 2009. They offer 22 sectional tournaments which cater to 250 high school teams across the state. Teams which qualify at the sectional level compete for the state title in May.

States across the country have taken to Illinois' lead. Kentucky was the second to follow suit in 2012. Private groups have seen the opportunity to grow the industry as well through exposure of high school student to tournament bass fishing. The Bass Federation, for example, offers high school tournament series in 44 states, eventually crowning a State Champion and giving them the opportunity to compete on the national level.

==== Collegiate ====
Competitive collegiate bass fishing circuits in the United States include FLW College Fishing, the Bassmaster College Series, and Cabela's Collegiate Bass Fishing Series. The FLW College Series includes three regional qualifiers in each of five regions of the U.S. denoted by FLW. The top fifteen finishing teams in each of these regional qualifiers advance to the Regional Invitational tournament and have an opportunity to advance to the FLW College National Championship and fish for a place in the following year's Forrest L Woods Cup Professional Bass Tournament.

Similarly, the Bassmaster College Series divides the nation into five regions. They only offer one qualifying opportunity at the regional level as opposed to the three offered by the FLW College Series. The top 15 from each of the 5 regional qualifiers advance directly to the Bassmaster College Series National Champion and compete for a position in the next year's Bassmaster Classic.

The Cabelas Collegiate Bass Fishing Series is compiled of numerous tournaments accredited by the Association of Collegiate Anglers. The tournaments range in size from 20–30 boats all the way up to 100+ boats. The Cabelas Collegiate Bass Fishing Series compiles a ranking of "School of the Year" points, which are often coveted by schools across the country. Points are gathered through successful tournament finishes in tournaments recognized by the Association of Collegiate Anglers. Cabelas Collegiate Bass Fishing Series also hosts a large-scale national open. That is not the only one of its kind, as BoatUS hosts a similar "National Championship." Unlike the Bassmaster College Series and FLW College Series National Championships, these require no qualification from regional tournaments, and can be entered simply by signing up and paying the entry fee.

Indiana University was the first to establish a tournament fishing club in 1989, with Purdue University creating one soon afterwards. The University of Illinois was third to make a tournament bass fishing student organization, and the trend has grown tremendously ever since.

=== Other countries ===
Competitive bass fishing has also spread to anglers in other countries such as Japan, Korea, Italy, Australia and South Africa. Takahiro Omori, a Japanese angler living in Texas, won the 2004 Bassmaster Classic title. Australian tournaments are based on a native freshwater fish called Australian bass that is unrelated to largemouth bass.

== Professional Bass Angling ==
With the rise in popularity of competitive bass fishing came the multibillion-dollar industry of professional bass angling. The rise in popularity and the companies that have supported the sport have now made it possible to turn bass angling into a professional sport. A professional bass angler is a person who competes in bass fishing pro circuit and may also have company sponsorships. Some famous pro circuits include Bass Anglers Sportsman Society (BASS), Walmart FLW Tour, and the Major League Fishing (MLF) Bass Pro Tour (BPT) .

To join professional circuits, anglers typically compete in and win smaller local events to build a reputation. Many professional bass anglers obtain sponsorships, which help cover the costs of competition while also promoting the sponsoring companies. In recent years, some emerging anglers have begun documenting their activities online to build an audience and attract additional sponsors. When not competing, anglers often attend public seminars and give presentations. A key part of their role is to promote themselves and their sponsors, helping to increase the sponsors’ visibility.

Some of the most famous names in professional bass angling include Ray Scott, Kevin VanDam, Scott Martin, Bill Dance, Roland Martin, Jimmy Houston, Rick Clunn, and Mike Iaconelli. Ray Scott is the founder of Bass Anglers Sportsman Society, otherwise known as BASS. Ray Scott started BASS in 1967 and has paved the way for professional circuits by starting the BASS Tournament Trail. VanDam is a professional competition angler and has won the Bassmaster Classic four times. He also gained fame by being named Angler of the Year in 1992. Iaconelli is a professional competition angler in the BASS Elite Series, who has made a name for himself by winning the Bassmaster Classic and the Toyota Elite Series AOY.

Professional bass angling salaries fluctuate greatly depending on the marketability of the angler. In 2006 Kevin VanDam made $500,000 from his sponsors while Iaconelli made $370,000. That does not include the prize money from winning competitions. Although there are some professionals that earn this much money, it is not the case for all of them. Gene Ellison the executive director of the Professional Anglers Association is quoted saying, "more than half of the guys out here this weekend are going broke", during the Bassmaster Classic of 2006.

In recent years the sport has not only reached out to men but to women as well. There is a large following of women bass fishing who are trying to become professional and have their own women circuit. The Lady Bass Anglers Association was started for that purpose. Since it began in the 1970's, the catch-and-release ethic has become the standard for most black bass anglers. It has been so widely accepted that harvest rates for black bass in most Alabama reservoirs are less than 5%. However, traditional black bass tournaments are an exception. They typically require competitors to retain their catch for a live weigh-in at the conclusion of the event. The bass are usually released following the event, often with live release rates approaching 100%. Most competitors and tournament organizers make a valiant effort to ensure that these bass remain healthy while in their care. Unfortunately, an exhaustive list of scientific studies has shown that this does not adequately address the long-term mortality caused by the stress of confinement, handling, livewell agitation, excessive water temperatures, poor water quality, and disease transmission. Even with excellent fish care protocols, mortality in the days following an event can range from 30% - 80%, depending on the predominant species and water temperature. Because the largest fish are being targeted, the size-structure of the population is often affected. With that in mind competitive bass fishing tournaments should utilize catch-weigh-release (CWR) or catch-measure-release (CMR) formats to minimize unnecessary mortality associated with competitive angling events. The formats are being used successfully by kayak anglers and other conservation-minded bass clubs. There are a number of manufacturers of scales, measuring boards, and software which is specifically designed for CWR or CMR.

== See also ==
- Double Whammy (novel)
- Striped bass fishing
