= Cape Town Agreement =

Fishing Law

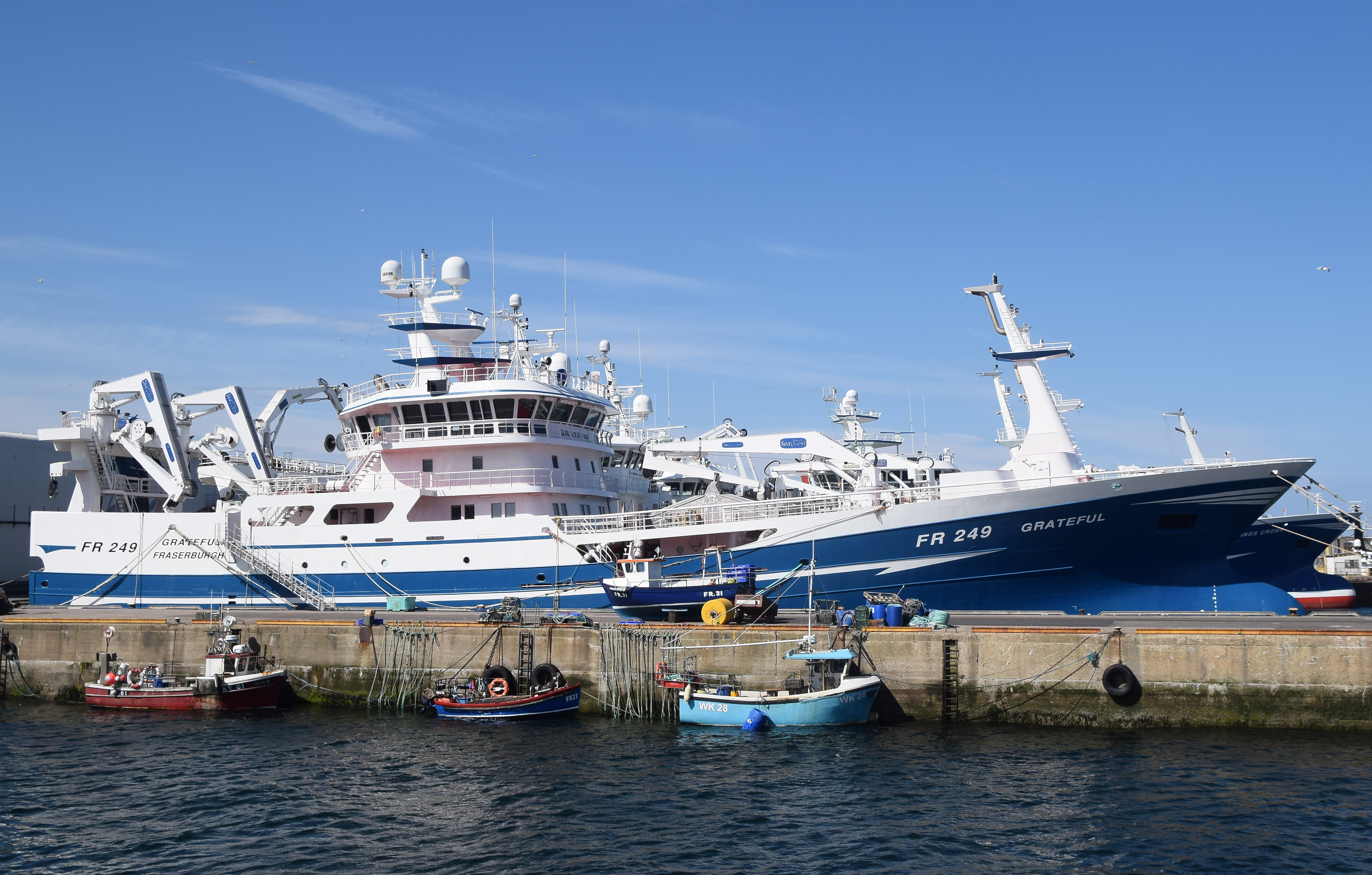
The Agreement covers large fishing vessels (those over 24m in length)

The Cape Town Agreement is an international IMO legal instrument that sets out minimum safety requirements for fishing vessels of 24 metres in length and over or equivalent in gross tons. The Cape Town Agreement was established in 2012 but has not entered in force.

The treaty will enter info force when at least 22 states, with over 3,600 fishing vessels of 24m in length sign the treaty. As of October 2025, there are 25 contracting States to the agreement. These are Belgium, Belize, Congo, Cook Islands, Croatia, Denmark, Finland, France, Germany, Iceland, Japan, Kenya, Namibia, The Netherlands, New Zealand, Nicaragua, Norway, Peru, Saint Kitts and Nevis, Sao Tome and Principe, South Africa, Spain, Ghana and Vanuatu. In 2023, the 23 member States represent approximately 2935 eligible fishing vessels, with 665 more required to reach the 3,600 declared fishing vessels.

The 2012 Cape Town Agreement, with the accession by Argentina on 24 February 2026, met the requirements for entry into force (at least 22 States, collectively representing 3,600 qualifying fishing vessels) and will enter into force in February 2027.

At present there are 28 contracting Member States to the Cape Town Agreement : Argentina, Belgium, Belize, Congo, Cook Islands, Croatia, Denmark, Finland, France, Germany, Ghana, Iceland, Japan, Kenya, Namibia, Kingdom of the Netherlands, New Zealand, Nicaragua, Norway, Peru, Portugal, Republic of Korea, Saint Kitts and Nevis, Sao Tome and Principe, Solomon Islands, South Africa, Spain and Vanuatu, collectively representing 3,754 vessels of 24 metres or more in length.

== Content ==
The Cape Town Agreement defines minimum requirements on the design, construction and equipment of fishing vessels. It also includes details for the inspection of fishing vessels, as well as mandatory requirements for ship stability, seaworthiness, life-saving appliances, fire safety, ventilation and communication equipment. The regulations are designed to protect the safety of fishing vessel crews and to establish a common standard for the industry. The Agreement is designed to reduce the high number of deaths in the international fishing industry.

The Cape Town Agreement will updated, amend and replace the Torremolinos Protocol of 1993 and the Torremolinos International Convention for the Safety of Fishing Vessels of 1977.

The Agreement allows a flag State to exempt any fishing vessels flying its flag from compliance, provided that a certain set of minimum criteria are applicable.
