= Fishing vessel =

Boat or ship used to catch fish

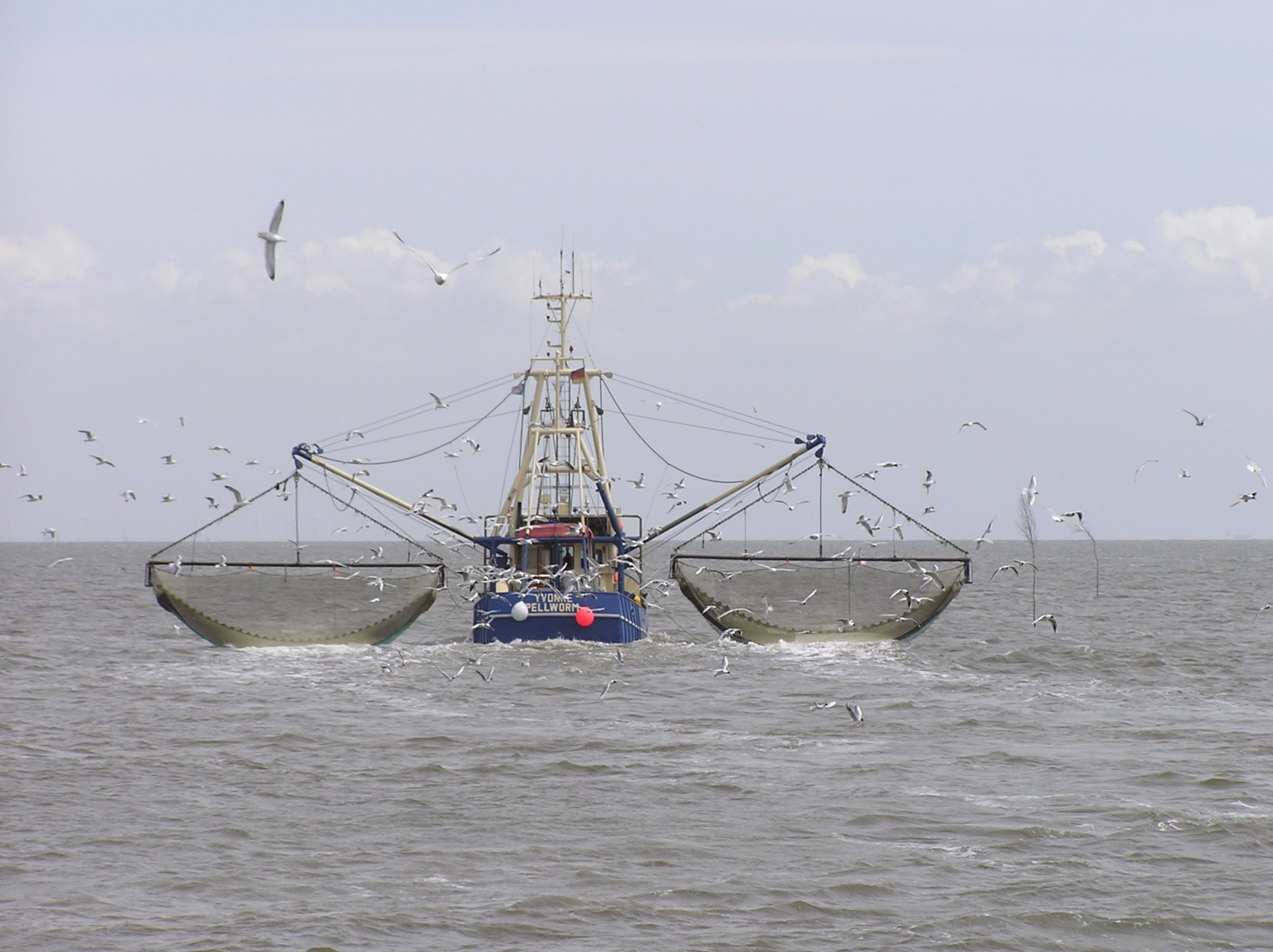
Crab boat working the North Sea

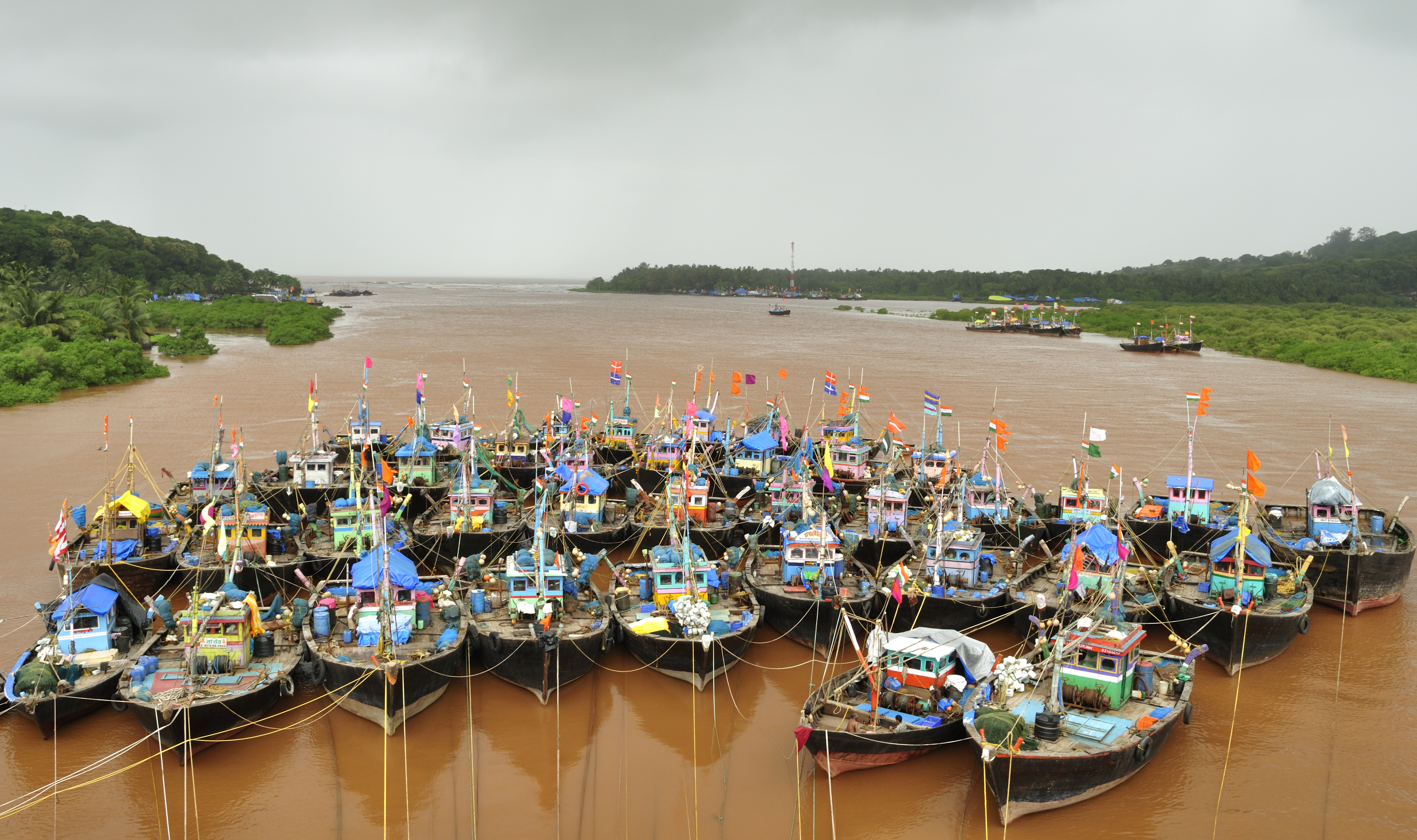
Fishing boats lashed together in a tidal creek in Anjarle village, Maharashtra, India

A fishing vessel is a boat or ship used to catch fish and other valuable nektonic aquatic animals (e.g. shrimps/prawns, krills, coleoids, etc.) in the sea, lake or river. Humans have used different kinds of surface vessels in commercial, artisanal and recreational fishing.

Prior to the 1950s there was little standardisation of fishing boats. Designs could vary between localities and even different boatyards. Traditional fishing boats were built of wood, which is not often used nowadays because of higher maintenance costs and lower durability. Fibreglass is used increasingly in smaller fishing vessels up to 25 metres (100-tonne displacement), while steel is usually used on vessels above 25 metres.

It is difficult to estimate the number of recreational fishing boats. They range in size from small dinghies, sailboats and motorboats to large superyachts and chartered cruiseliners. Unlike commercial fishing vessels, recreational fishing vessels are often more for leisurely cruising other than dedicated just to fishing.

== History ==
=== Traditional fishing boats ===
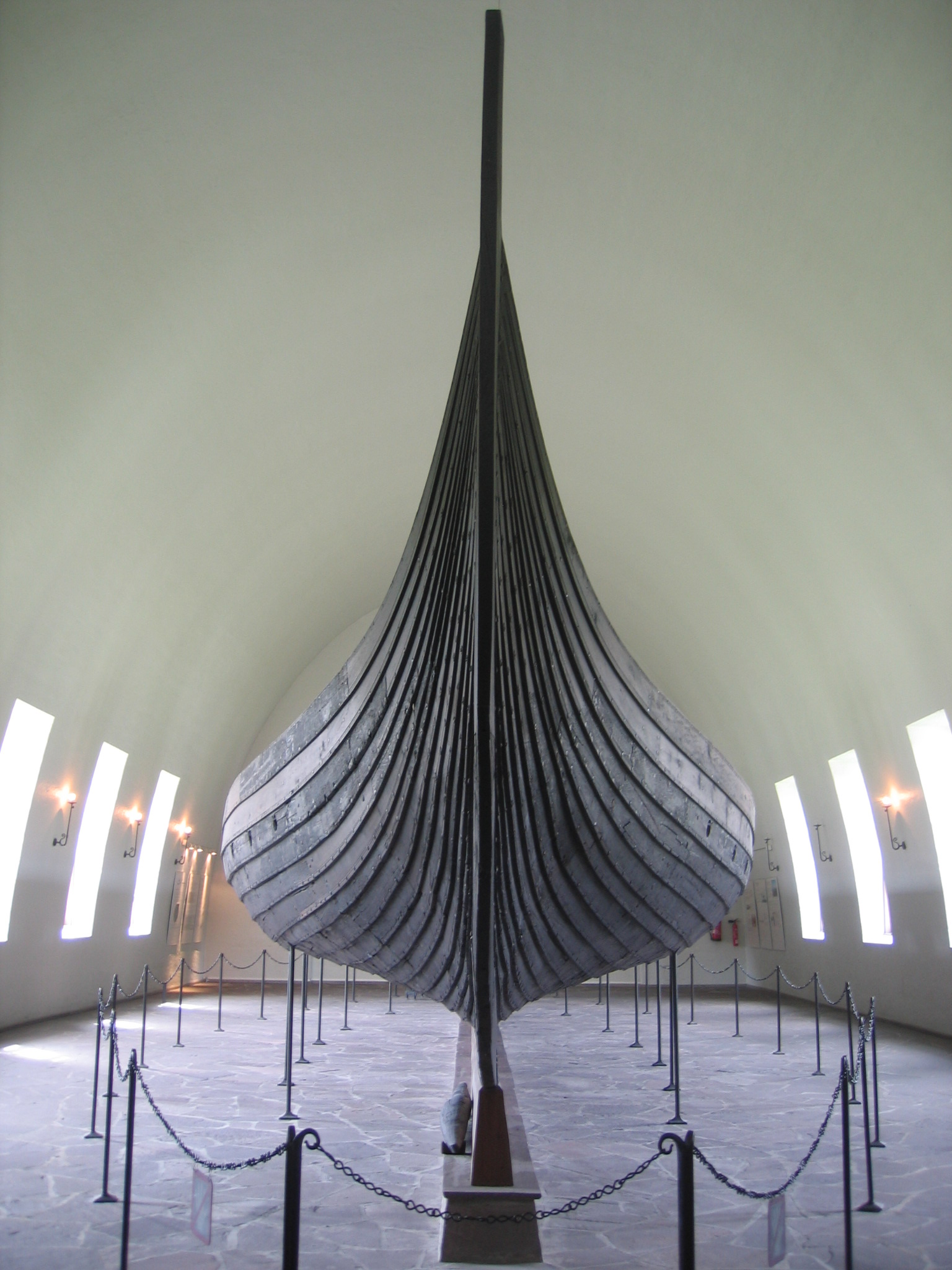
Viking boat showing clinker planking.

Early fishing vessels included rafts, dugout canoes, and boats constructed from a frame covered with hide or tree bark, along the lines of a coracle. The oldest boats found by archaeological excavation are dugout canoes dating back to the Neolithic Period around 7,000-9,000 years ago. These canoes were often cut from coniferous tree logs, using simple stone tools. A 7,000-year-old seagoing boat made from reeds and tar has been found in Kuwait. These early vessels had limited capability; they could float and move on water, but were not suitable for use any great distance from the shoreline. They were used mainly for fishing and hunting.

The development of fishing boats took place in parallel with the development of boats for trade and war. Early navigators began to use animal skins or woven fabrics for sails. Affixed to a pole set upright in the boat, these sails gave early boats more range, allowing voyages of exploration.

Around 4000 B.C., Egyptians were building long narrow boats powered by many oarsmen. Over the next 1,000 years, they made a series of remarkable advances in boat design. They developed cotton-made sails to help their boats go faster with less work. Then they built boats large enough to cross the oceans. These boats had sails and oarsmen, and were used for travel and trade. By 3000 BC, the Egyptians knew how to assemble planks of wood into a ship hull. They used woven straps to lash planks together, and reeds or grass stuffed between the planks to seal the seams. An example of their skill is the Khufu ship, a vessel 143 feet (44 m) in length entombed at the foot of the Great Pyramid of Giza around 2,500 BC and found intact in 1954.

At about the same time, the Scandinavians were also building innovative boats. People living near Kongens Lyngby in Denmark came up with the idea of segregated hull compartments, which allowed the size of boats to gradually be increased. A crew of some two dozen paddled the wooden Hjortspring boat across the Baltic Sea long before the rise of the Roman Empire. Scandinavians continued to develop better ships, incorporating iron and other metal into the design and developing oars for propulsion.

By 1000 A.D. the Norsemen were pre-eminent on the oceans. They were skilled seamen and boat builders, with clinker-built boat designs that varied according to the type of boat. Trading boats, such as the knarrs, were wide to allow large cargo storage. Raiding boats, such as the longship, were long and narrow and very fast. The vessels they used for fishing were scaled down versions of their cargo boats. The Scandinavian innovations influenced fishing boat design long after the Viking period came to an end. For example, yoles from the Orkney Island of Stroma were built in the same way as the Norse boats.

=== Early modern designs ===
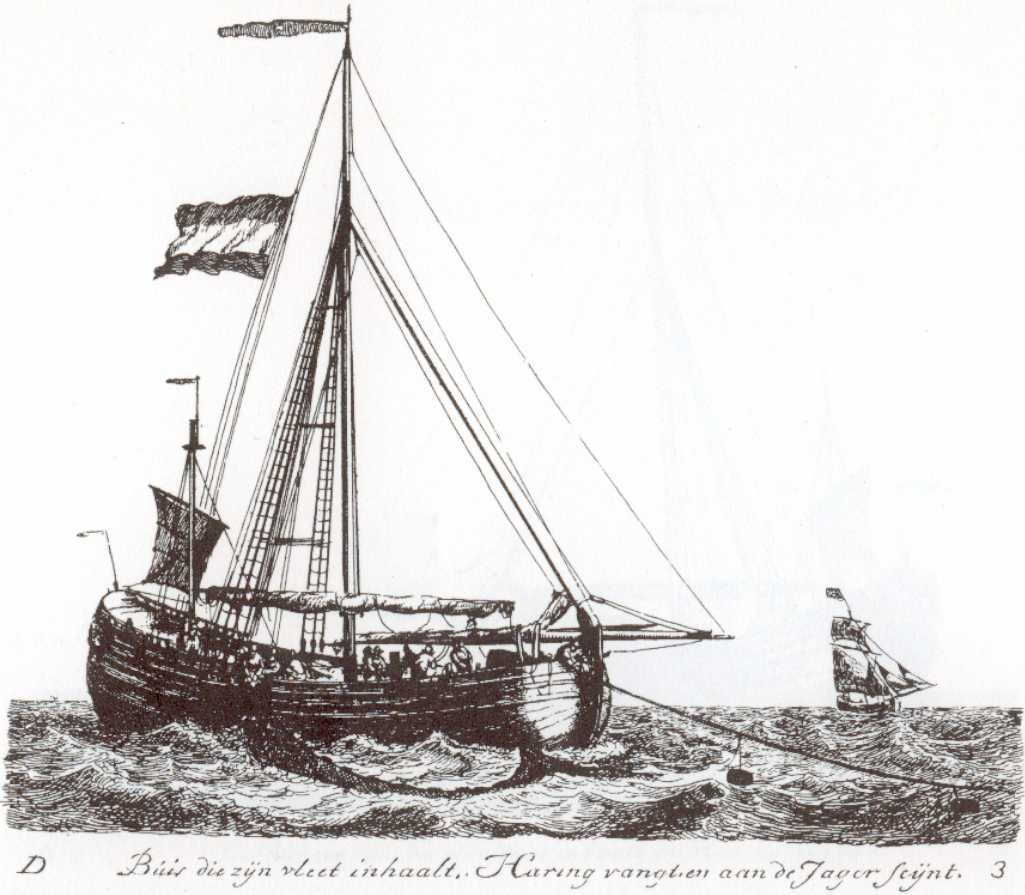
Herring Buss taking aboard its drift net (G. Groenewegen).

In the 15th century, the Dutch developed a type of seagoing herring drifter that became a blueprint for European fishing boats. This was the Herring Buss, used by Dutch herring fishermen until the early 19th centuries. The ship type buss has a long history. It was known around 1000 AD in Scandinavia as a bǘza, a robust variant of the Viking longship. The first herring buss was probably built in Hoorn around 1415. The ship was about 20 metres long and displaced between 60 and 100 tons. It was a massive round-bilged keel ship with a bluff bow and stern, the latter relatively high, and with a gallery. The busses used long drifting gill nets to catch the herring. The nets would be retrieved at night and the crews of eighteen to thirty men would set to gibbing, salting and barrelling the catch on the broad deck.

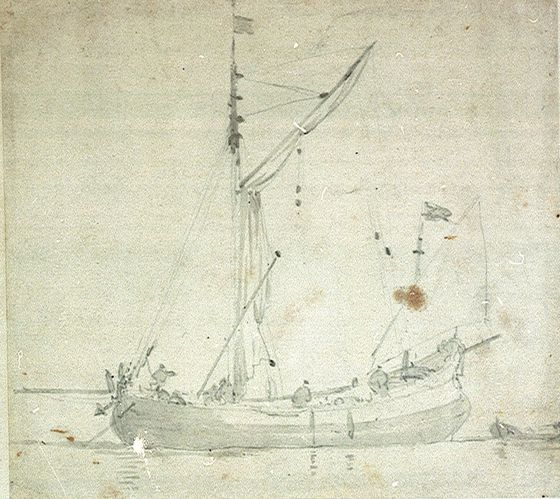
A dogger viewed from before the port beam. c. 1675 by Willem van de Velde the Younger.

During the 17th century, the British developed the dogger, an early type of sailing trawler or longliner, which commonly operated in the North Sea. Doggers were slow but sturdy, capable of fishing in the rough conditions of the North Sea. Like the herring buss, they were wide-beamed and bluff-bowed, but considerably smaller, about 15 metres long, a maximum beam of 4.5 metres, a draught of 1.5 metres, and displacing about 13 tonnes. They could carry a tonne of bait, three tonnes of salt, half a tonne each of food and firewood for the crew, and return with six tonnes of fish. Decked areas forward and aft probably provided accommodation, storage and a cooking area. An anchor would have allowed extended periods fishing in the same spot, in waters up to 18 metres deep. The dogger would also have carried a small open boat for maintaining lines and rowing ashore.

A precursor to the dory type was the early French bateau type, a flat bottom boat with straight sides used as early as 1671 on the Saint Lawrence River. The common coastal boat of the time was the wherry and the merging of the wherry design with the simplified flat bottom of the bateau resulted in the birth of the dory. England, France, Italy, and Belgium have small boats from medieval periods that could reasonably be construed as predecessors of the Dory.

Dories appeared in New England fishing towns sometime after the early 18th century. They were small, shallow-draft boats, usually about five to seven metres (15 to 22 feet) long. Lightweight and versatile, with high sides, a flat bottom and sharp bows, they were easy and cheap to build. The Banks dories appeared in the 1830s. They were designed to be carried on mother ships and used for fishing cod at the Grand Banks. Adapted almost directly from the low freeboard, French river bateaus, with their straight sides and removable thwarts, bank dories could be nested inside each other and stored on the decks of fishing schooners, such as the Gazela Primeiro, for their trip to the Grand Banks fishing grounds.

=== Modern fishing trawler ===
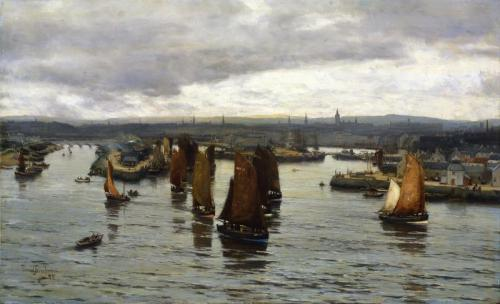
The Herring Fleet Leaving the Dee by David Farquharson, 1888

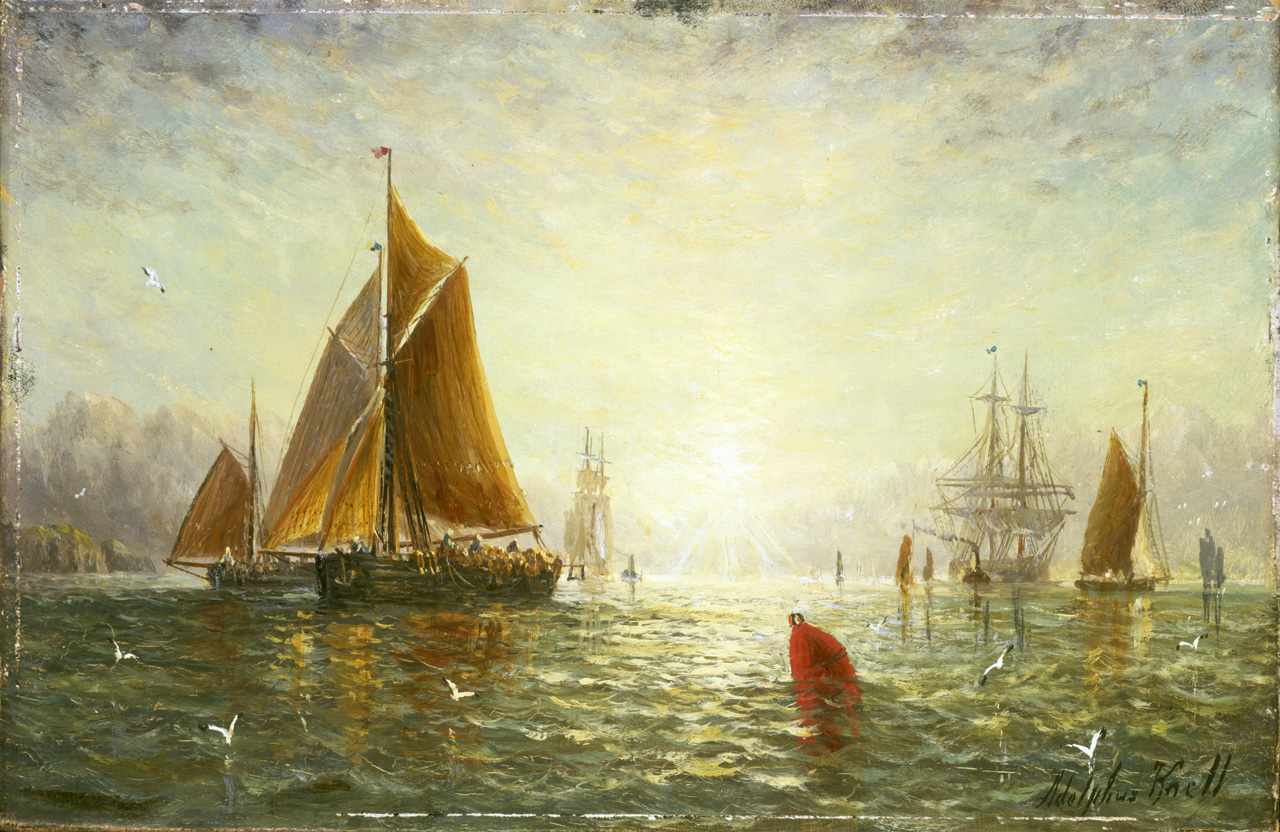
A Brixham trawler by William Adolphus Knell. The painting is now in the National Maritime Museum.

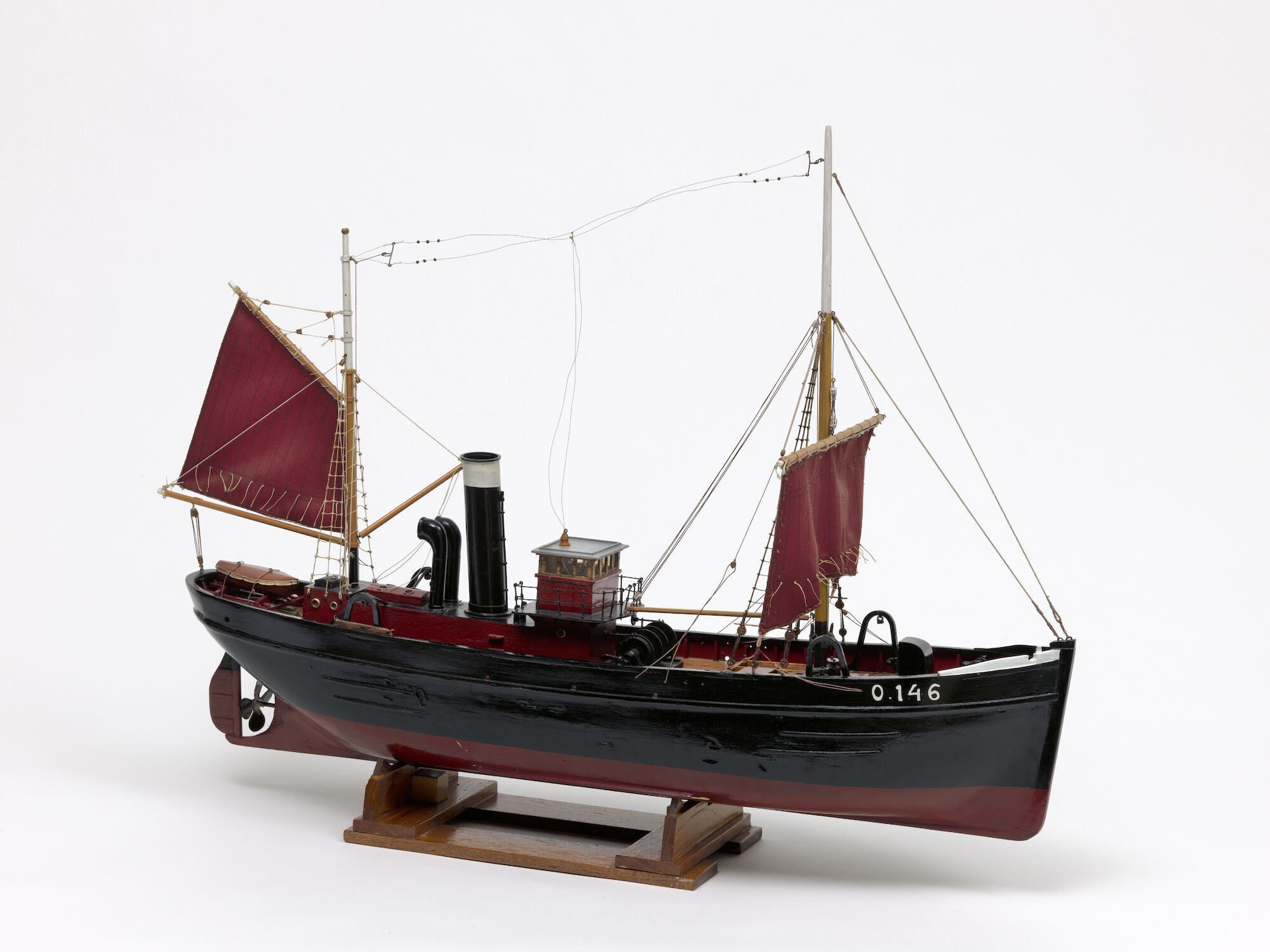
Model of a steamship, NAVIGO National Fisheries Museum

The Portuguese muletta and the British dogger were early types of sailing trawler in use before the 17th century and onward, but the modern fishing trawler was developed in the 19th century.

By the early 19th century, the fishermen at Brixham needed to expand their fishing area further than ever before due to the ongoing depletion of stocks that was occurring in the overfished waters of South Devon. The Brixham trawler that evolved there was of a sleek build and had a tall gaff rig, which gave the vessel sufficient speed to make long-distance trips out to the fishing grounds in the ocean. They were also sufficiently robust to be able to tow large trawls in deep water. The great trawling fleet that built up at Brixham earned the village the title of 'Mother of Deep-Sea Fisheries'.

This revolutionary design made large-scale trawling in the ocean possible for the first time, resulting in a massive migration of fishermen from the ports in the South of England to villages further north, such as Scarborough, Hull, Grimsby, Harwich and Yarmouth, that were points of access to the large fishing grounds in the Atlantic Ocean.

The small village of Grimsby grew to become the largest fishing port in the world by the mid 19th century. With the tremendous expansion in the fishing industry, the Grimsby Dock Company was formed in 1846. The dock covered 25 acres (10 ha) and was formally opened by Queen Victoria in 1854 as the first modern fishing port. The facilities incorporated many innovations of the time - the dock gates and cranes were operated by hydraulic power, and the 300-foot (91 m) Grimsby Dock Tower was built to provide a head of water with sufficient pressure by William Armstrong.

The elegant Brixham trawler spread across the world, influencing fishing fleets everywhere. Their distinctive sails inspired the song 'Red Sails in the Sunset', written aboard a Brixham sailing trawler called the Torbay Lass. By the end of the 19th century, there were over 3,000 fishing trawlers in commission in Britain, with almost 1,000 at Grimsby. These trawlers were sold to fishermen around Europe, including from the Netherlands and Scandinavia. Twelve trawlers went on to form the nucleus of the German fishing fleet.

Although fishing vessel design increasingly began to converge around the world, local conditions still often led the development of different types of fishing boats. The Lancashire nobby was used down the north west coast of England as a shrimp trawler from 1840 until World War II. The Manx nobby was used around the Isle of Man as a herring drifter. The fifie was also used as a herring drifter along the east coast of Scotland from the 1850s until well into the 20th century.

==== Advent of steam power ====
The earliest steam-powered fishing boats first appeared in the 1870s and used the trawl system of fishing as well as lines and drift nets. These were large boats, usually 80–90 feet (24–27 m) in length with a beam of around 20 feet (6.1 m). They weighed 40-50 tons and travelled at 9–11 knots (17–20 km/h; 10–13 mph).

The earliest purpose-built fishing vessels were designed and made by David Allan in Leith in March 1875, when he converted a drifter to steam power. In 1877, he built the first screw propelled steam trawler in the world. This vessel was Pioneer LH854. She was of wooden construction with two masts and carried a gaff rigged main and mizzen using booms, and a single foresail. Pioneer is mentioned in The Shetland Times of 4 May 1877. In 1878 he completed Forward and Onward, steam-powered trawlers for sale. Allan built a total of ten boats at Leith between 1877 and 1881. Twenty-one boats were completed at Granton, his last vessel being Degrave in 1886. Most of these were sold to foreign owners in France, Belgium, Spain and the West Indies.

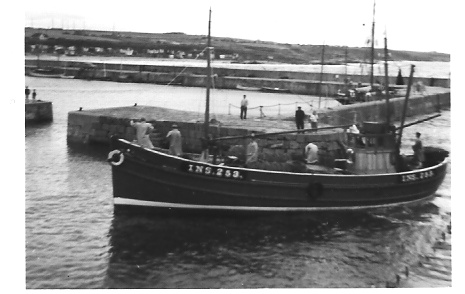
Seine Net Trawler, Hopeman 1958.

The first steam boats were made of wood, but steel hulls were soon introduced and were divided into watertight compartments. They were well designed for the crew with a large building that contained the wheelhouse and the deckhouse. The boats built in the 20th century only had a mizzen sail, which was used to help steady the boat when its nets were out. The main function of the mast was now as a crane for lifting the catch ashore. It also had a steam capstan on the foredeck near the mast for hauling nets. The boats had narrow, high funnels so that the steam and thick coal smoke was released high above the deck and away from the fishermen. These funnels were nicknamed woodbines because they looked like the popular brand of cigarette. These boats had a crew of twelve made up of a skipper, driver, fireman (to look after the boiler) and nine deck hands.

Steam fishing boats had many advantages. They were usually about 20 ft longer (6.1 m) than the sailing vessels so they could carry more nets and catch more fish. This was important, as the market was growing quickly at the beginning of the 20th century. They could travel faster and further and with greater freedom from weather, wind and tide. Because less time was spent travelling to and from the fishing grounds, more time could be spent fishing. The steam boats also gained the highest prices for their fish, as they could return quickly to harbour with their fresh catch. The main disadvantage of the steam boats, though, was their high operating costs. Their engines were mechanically inefficient and took up much space, while fuel and fitting out costs were very high. Before the First World War, building costs were between 3,000 and £4,000, at least three times the cost of the sail boats. To cover these high costs, they needed to fish for longer seasons. The higher expenses meant that more steam drifters were company-owned or jointly owned. As the herring fishing industry declined, steam boats became too expensive. Steam trawlers were introduced at Grimsby and Hull in the 1880s. In 1890 it was estimated that there were 20,000 men on the North Sea. The steam drifter was not used in the herring fishery until 1897. The last sailing fishing trawler was built in 1925 in Grimsby.

==== Further development ====
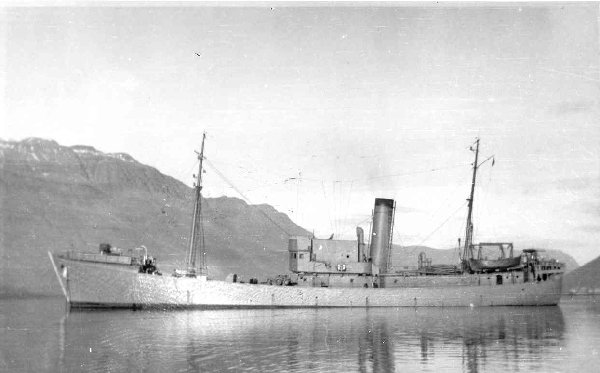
Armed trawler HNoMS Honningsvåg off Iceland.

Trawler designs adapted as the way they were powered changed from sail to coal-fired steam by World War I to diesel and turbines by the end of World War II.

The first trawlers fished over the side, rather than over the stern. In 1947, the company Christian Salvesen, based in Leith, Scotland, refitted a surplus Algerine-class minesweeper (HMS Felicity) with refrigeration equipment and a factory ship stern ramp, to produce the first combined freezer/stern trawler in 1947.

The first purpose-built stern trawler was Fairtry, built in 1953 at Aberdeen. The ship was much larger than any other trawlers then in operation and inaugurated the era of the 'super trawler'. As the ship pulled its nets over the stern, it could lift out a much greater haul of up to 60 tons. Lord Nelson followed in 1961, installed with vertical plate freezers that had been researched and built at the Torry Research Station. These ships served as a basis for the expansion of 'super trawlers' around the world in the following decades.

In recent decades, commercial fishing vessels have been increasingly equipped with electronic aids, such as radio navigation aids and fish finders. During the Cold War, some countries fitted fishing trawlers with additional electronic gear so they could be used as spy ships to monitor the activities of other countries.

== Global trends ==
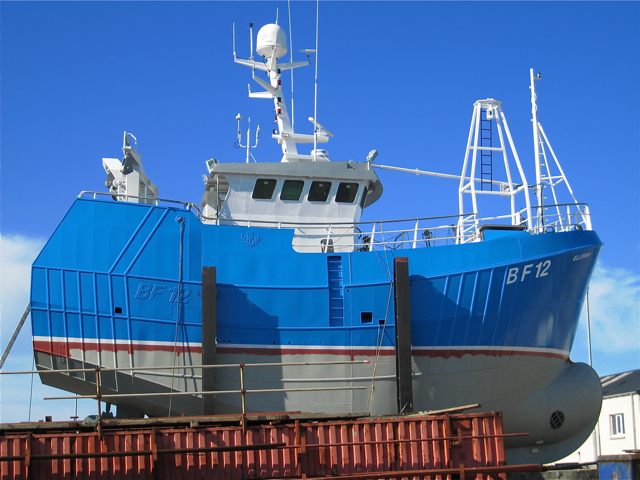
Robustly designed contemporary fishing boat

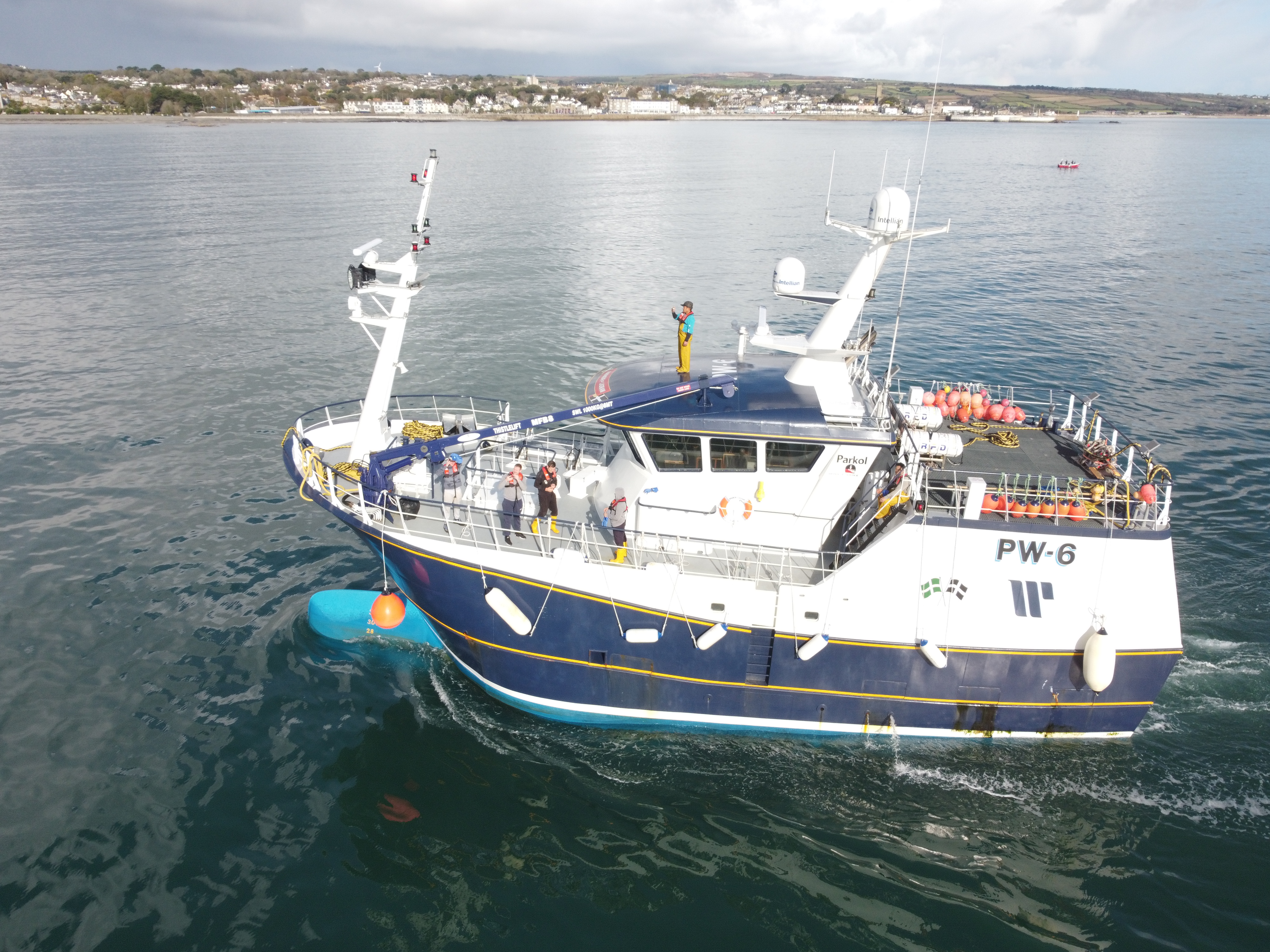
A gill netter returning to port

Distribution of world fishing fleet by zone of operation and region, 2024

World fishing fleet, 1995 - 2024

About 1.3 million of these are decked vessels with enclosed areas. Nearly all of these decked vessels are mechanised, and 40,000 of them are over 100 tons. At the other extreme, two-thirds (1.8 million) of the undecked boats are traditional craft of various types, powered only by sail and oars. These boats are used by artisan fishers.

The Cape Town Agreement is an international International Maritime Organization legal instrument established in 2012, that sets out minimum safety requirements for fishing vessels of 24 metres in length and over or equivalent in gross tons.

The world fishing fleet was estimated at about 5 million vessels in 2024, operating mainly in Asia (72% of the total), followed by Africa (18%), Latin America and the Caribbean (6%), Northern America and Europe (2% each), and Oceania (less than 1%). Half of the world fishing fleet is concentrated in four Asian countries (Indonesia, Philippines, China and India), and two-thirds in just ten countries. Motorized vessels represent more than two-thirds of the global fishing fleet, operating mostly in Asia (80%), which also hosts the largest (53%) non-motorized fleet. Africa has the second-largest non-motorized fleet, estimated at 42% of the total. Many fishing nations (e.g. China, Japan and European Union Member States) continue policies of reducing the size of their fishing fleets.

== Commercial vessels ==
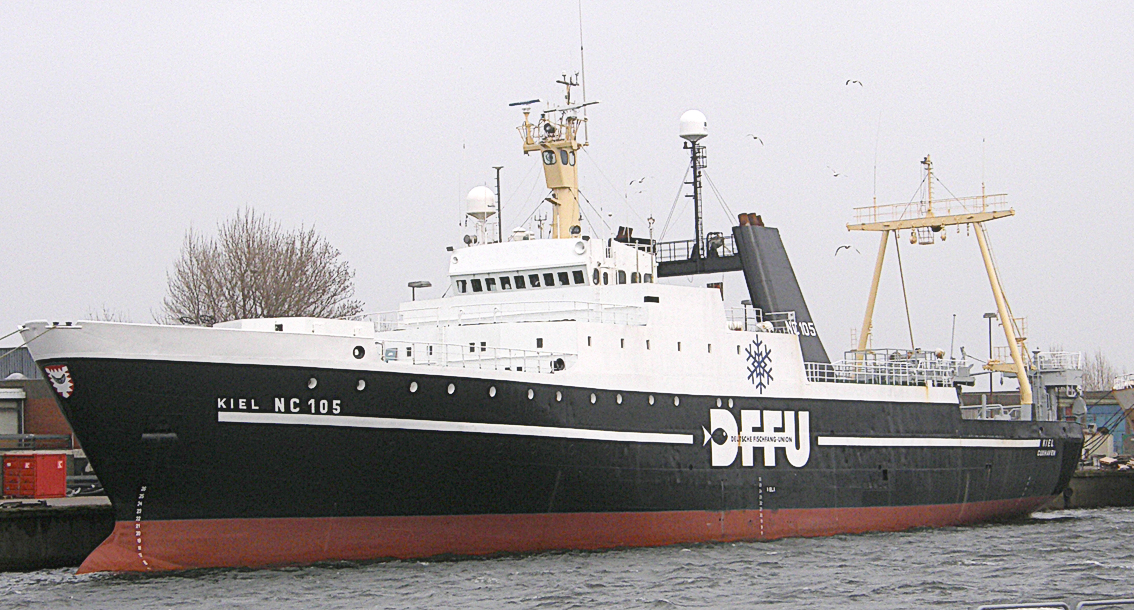
The German factory ship Kiel NC 105

The 200-mile fishing limit has changed fishing patterns and, in recent times, fishing boats are becoming more specialised and standardised. In the United States and Canada more use is made of large factory trawlers, while the huge blue water fleets operated by Japan and the Soviet-bloc countries have contracted. In western Europe, fishing vessel design is focused on compact boats with high catching power.

Commercial fishing is a high risk industry, and countries are introducing regulations governing the construction and operation of fishing vessels. The International Maritime Organization, convened in 1959 by the United Nations, is responsible for devising measures aimed at the prevention of accidents, including standards for ship design, construction, equipment, operation and manning.

According to the FAO, in 2004 the world's fishing fleet consisted of 4 million vessels. Of these, 1.3 million were decked vessels with enclosed areas. The rest were open vessels, of which two-thirds were traditional craft propelled by sails and oars. By contrast, nearly all decked vessels were mechanized. Of the decked vessels, 86% are found in Asia, 7.8% in Europe, 3.8% in North and Central America, 1.3% in Africa, 0.6% in South America and 0.4% in Oceania. Most commercial fishing boats are small, usually less than 30 metres (98 ft) but up to 100 metres (330 ft) for a large purse seiner or factory ship.

Commercial fishing vessels can be classified by architecture, the type of fish they catch, the fishing method used, or geographical origin. The following classification follows the FAO, who classify commercial fishing vessels by the gear they use.

=== Fishing gear ===
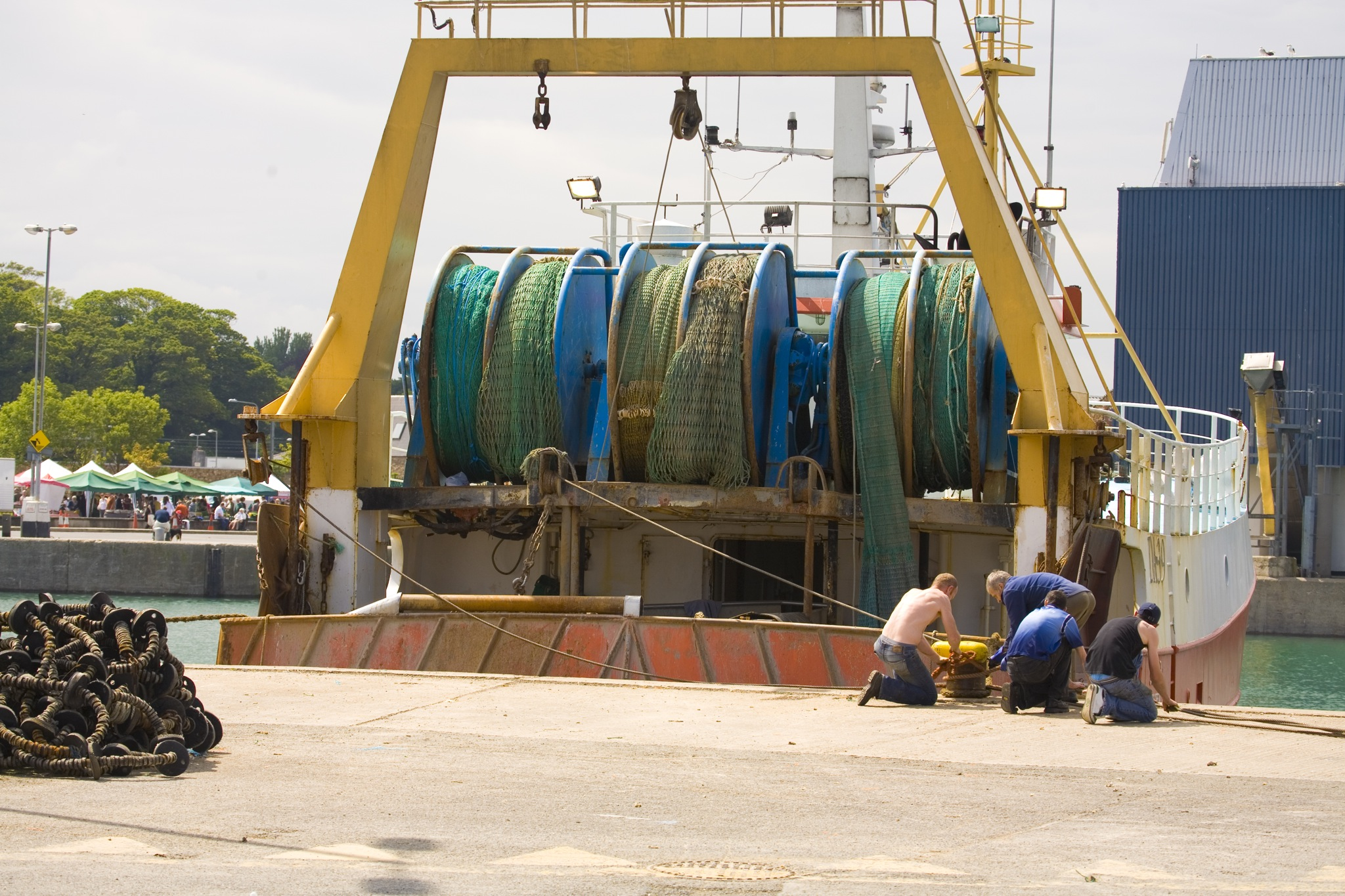
Drum winches mounted at the stern of an Irish trawler

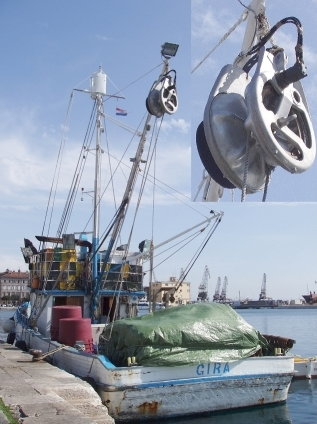
Puretic power block

=== Trawlers ===
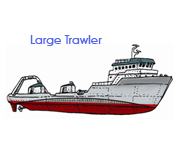

A trawler is a fishing vessel designed to use trawl nets in order to catch large volumes of fish.

- Outrigger trawlers – use outriggers to tow the trawl. These are commonly used to catch shrimp. One or two otter trawls can be towed from each side. Beam trawlers, employed in the North sea for catching flatfish, are another form of outrigger trawler. Medium-sized and high powered vessels, these tow a beam trawl on each side at speeds up to 8 knots.
  - Beam trawlers – use sturdy outrigger booms for towing a beam trawl, one warp on each side. Double-rig beam trawlers can tow a separate trawl on each side of the trawler. Beam trawling is used in the flatfish and shrimp fisheries in the North Sea. They are medium-sized and high powered vessels, towing gear at speeds up to 8 knots. To avoid the boat capsizing if the trawl snags on the sea floor, winch brakes can be installed, along with safety release systems in the boom stays. The engine power of bottom trawlers is also restricted to 2000 HP (1472 KW) for further safety.
- Otter trawlers – deploy one or more parallel trawls kept apart horizontally using otter boards. These trawls can be towed in midwater or along the bottom.
- Pair trawlers – are trawlers which operate together towing a single trawl. They keep the trawl open horizontally by keeping their distance when towing. Otter boards are not used. Pair trawlers operate both midwater and bottom trawls.
- Side trawlers – have the trawl set over the side with the trawl warps passing through blocks which hang from two gallows, one forward and one aft. Until the late sixties, side trawlers were the most familiar vessel in the North Atlantic deep sea fisheries. They evolved over a longer period than other trawler types, but are now being replaced by stern trawlers.
- Stern trawlers – have trawls which are deployed and retrieved from the stern. Larger stern trawlers often have a ramp, though pelagic and small stern trawlers are often designed without a ramp. Stern trawlers are designed to operate in most weather conditions. They can work alone when midwater or bottom trawling, or two can work together as pair trawlers.
- Freezer trawlers – The majority of trawlers operating on high sea waters are freezer trawlers. They have facilities for preserving fish by freezing, allowing them to stay at sea for extended periods of time. They are medium to large size trawlers, with the same general arrangement as stern or side trawlers.
- Wet fish trawlers – are trawlers where the fish is kept in the hold in a fresh/wet condition. They must operate in areas not far distant from their landing place, and the fishing time of such vessels is limited.

=== Seiners ===
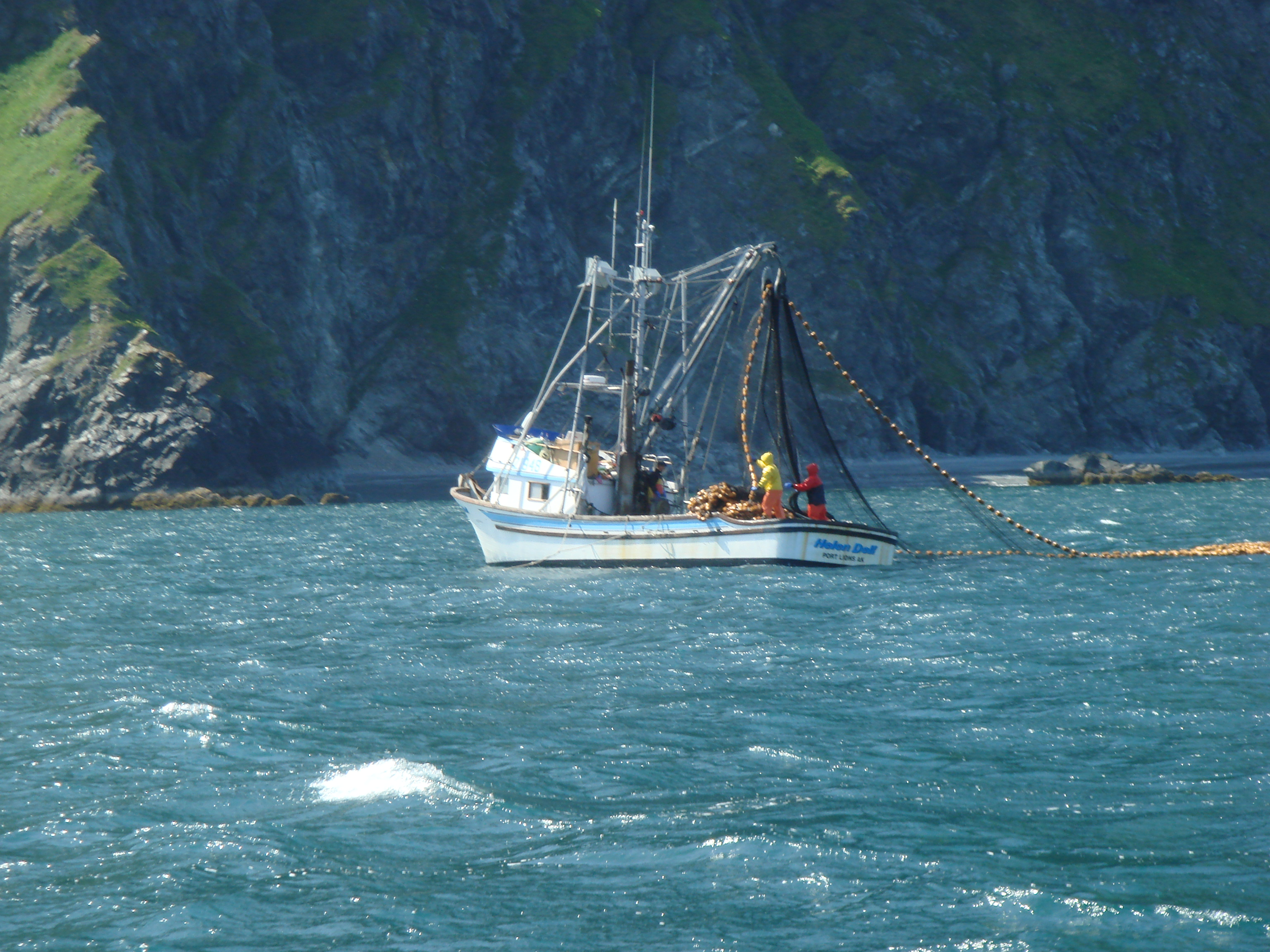
A seiner fishing for salmon off the coast of Raspberry Island, Alaska.

Seiners use surrounding and seine nets. This is a large group ranging from open boats as small as 10 metres (33 ft) in length to ocean-going vessels. There are also specialised gears that can target demersal species.

- Purse seiners are very effective at targeting aggregating pelagic species near the surface. The seiner circles the shoal with a deep curtain of netting, possibly using bow thrusters for better manoeuvrability. Then the bottom of the net is pursed (closed) underneath the fish shoal by hauling a wire running from the vessel through rings along the bottom of the net and then back to the vessel. The most important part of the fishing operation is searching for the fish shoals and assessing their size and direction of movement. Sophisticated electronics, such as echosounders, sonar, and track plotters, may be used are used to search for and track schools; assessing their size and movement and keeping in touch with the school while it is surrounded with the seine net. Crows nests may be built on the masts for further visual support. Large vessels can have observation towers and helicopter landing decks. Helicopters and spotter planes are used for detecting fish schools. The main types of purse seiners are the American seiners, the European seiners and the Drum seiners.
  - American seiners have their bridge and accommodation placed forward with the working deck aft. American seiners are most common on both coasts of North America and in other areas of Oceania. The net is stowed at the stern and is set over the stern. The power block is usually attached to a boom from a mast located behind the superstructure. American seiners use Triplerollers. A purse line winch is located amidships near the hauling station, near the side where the rings are taken on board.
  - European seiners have their bridge and accommodation located more to the after part of the vessel with the working deck amidships. European seiners are most common in waters fished by European nations. The net is stowed in a net bin at the stern, and is set over the stern from this position. The pursing winch is normally positioned at the forward part of the working deck.
  - Drum seiners have the same layout as American seiners except a drum is mounted on the stern and used instead of the power block. They are mainly used in Canada and USA.
  - Tuna purse seiners are large purse seiners, normally over 45 metres, equipped to handle large and heavy purse seines for tuna. They have the same general arrangement as the American seiner, with the bridge and accommodation placed forward. A crows nest or tuna tower is positioned at the top of the mast, outfitted with the control and manoeuvre devices. A very heavy boom which carries the power block is fitted at the mast. They often carry a helicopter to search for tuna schools. On the deck are three drum purse seine winches and a power block, with other specific winches to handle the heavy boom and net. They are usually equipped with a skiff.
- Seine netters - the basic types of seine netters are the anchor seiners and Scottish seiner in northern Europe and the Asian seiners in Asia.
  - Anchor seiners have the wheelhouse and accommodation aft and the working deck amidships, thus resembling side trawlers. The seine net is stored and shot from the stern, and they may carry a power block. Anchor seiners have the coiler and winch mounted transversally amidships.
  - Scottish seiners are basically configured the same as anchor seiners. The only difference is that, whereas the anchor seiner has the coiler and winch mounted transversally amidships, the Scottish seiner has them mounted transversally in the forward part of the vessel.
  - Asian seiners – In Asia, the seine netter usually has the wheelhouse forward and the working deck aft, in the manner of a stern trawler. However, in regions where the fishing effort is a labour-intensive, low-technology approach, they are often undecked and may be powered by outboards motors, or even by sail.
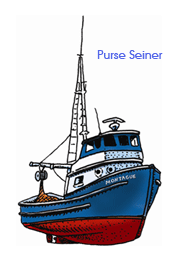
Purse seiner

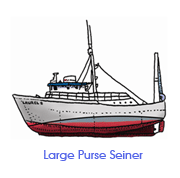
Large purse seiner

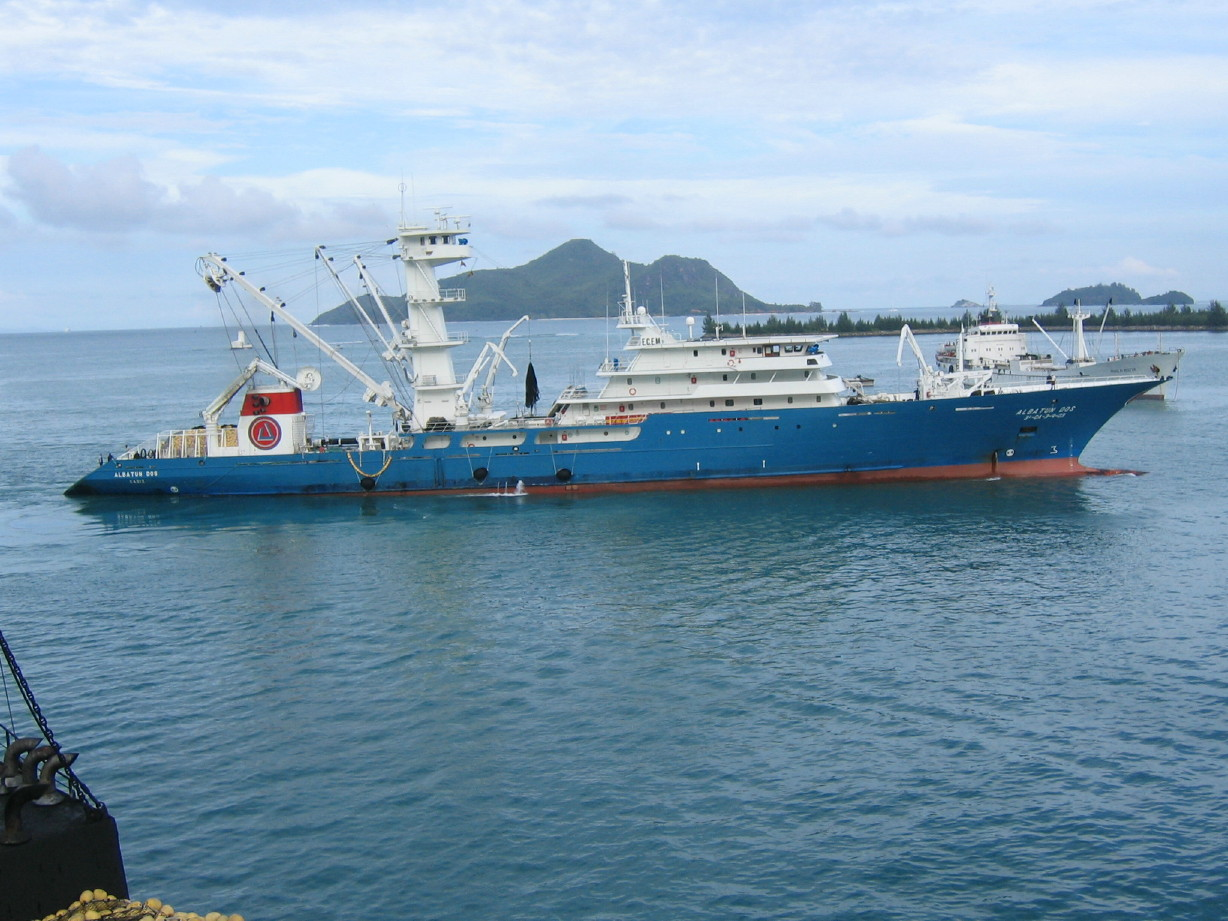
Spanish tuna purse seiner, Albatun Dos, near Victoria, Seychelles

=== Line vessels ===
Line vessels –

- Longliners – use one or more long heavy fishing lines with a series of hundreds or even thousands of baited hooks hanging from the main line by means of branch lines called "snoods". Hand operated longlining can be operated from boats of any size. The number of hooks and lines handled depends on the size of vessel, the number of crew, and the level of mechanisation. Large purpose built longliners can be designed for single species fisheries such as tuna. On such larger vessels the bridge is usually placed aft, and the gear is hauled from the bow or from the side with mechanical or hydraulic line haulers. The lines are set over the stern. Automatic or semi-automatic systems are used to bait hooks and shoot and haul lines. These systems include rail rollers, line haulers, hook separators, dehookers and hook cleaners, and storage racks or drums. To avoid incidental catches of seabirds, an outboard setting funnel is used to guide the line from the setting position on the stern down to a depth of one or two metres. Small scale longliners handle the gear by hand. The line is stored into baskets or tubs, perhaps using a hand cranked line drum.
  - Bottom longliners –
  - Midwater longliners – are usually medium-sized vessels which operate worldwide, purpose-built to catch large pelagics. The line hauler is usually forward starboard, where the fish are hauled through a gate in the rail. The lines are set from the stern where a baiting table and chute are located. These boats need adequate speed to reach distant fishing grounds, enough endurance for continued fishing, adequate freezing storage, suitable mechanisms for shooting and hauling longlines quickly, and proper storage for fishing gears and accessories.
  - Freezer longliners – are outfitted with freezing equipment. The holds are insulated and refrigerated. Freezer longliners are medium to large with the same general characteristics of other longliners. Most longliners operating on the high seas are freezer longliners.
  - Factory longliners – are generally equipped with processing plant, including mechanical gutting and filleting equipment accompanied by freezing facilities, as well as fish oil, fish meal and sometimes canning plants. These vessels have a large buffer capacity. Thus, caught fish can be stored in refrigerated sea water tanks and peaks in the catch can also be used. Freezer longliners are large ships, working the high seas with the same general characteristics of other large longliners.
  - Wet-fish longliners – keep the caught fish in the hold in the fresh/wet condition. The fish is stored in boxes and covered with ice, or stored with ice in the fish hold. The fishing time of such vessels is limited, so they operate close to the landing place.

External image
- Tuna Fishing – South Pacific – BBC Documentary

- Pole and line vessels – are used mainly to catch tuna and skipjack. The fishers stand at the railing or on special platforms and fish with poles and lines. The lines have hooks which are baited, preferably with live bait. Caught tuna are swung on board, by two to three fishermen if the tuna is big, or with an automated swinging mechanism. The tuna usually release themselves from the barbless hook when they hit the deck. Tanks with live bait are placed round the decks, and water spray systems are used to attract the fish. The vessels are 15 to 45 metres o/a. On smaller vessels fishers fish from the main deck right around the boat. With larger vessels, there are two different deck styles: the American style and the Japanese style.
  - American style – fishers stand on platforms arranged over the side abaft amidships and around the stern. The vessel moves ahead during fishing operation."Drawing". FAO. Archived from the original on 2015-09-24.
  - Japanese style – fishers stand at the rail in the forepart of the vessel. The vessel drifts during fishing operations."Drawing". FAO. Archived from the original on 2015-09-24.

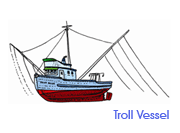

- Trollers – catch fish by towing astern one of more trolling lines. A trolling line is a fishing line with natural or artificial baited hooks trailed by a vessel near the surface or at a certain depth. Several lines can be towed at the same time using outriggers to keep the lines apart. The lines can be hauled in manually or by small winches. A length of rubber is often included in each line as a shock absorber. The trolling line is towed at a speed depending on the target species, from 2.3 knots up to at least 7 knots. Trollers range from small open boats to large refrigerated vessels 30 metres long. In many tropical artisanal fisheries, trolling is done with sailing canoes with outriggers for stability. With properly designed vessels, trolling is an economical and efficient way of catching tuna, mackerel and other pelagic fish swimming close to the surface. Purpose-built trollers are usually equipped with two or four trolling booms raised and lowered by topping lifts, held in position by adjustable stays. Electrically powered or hydraulic reels can be used to haul in the lines.

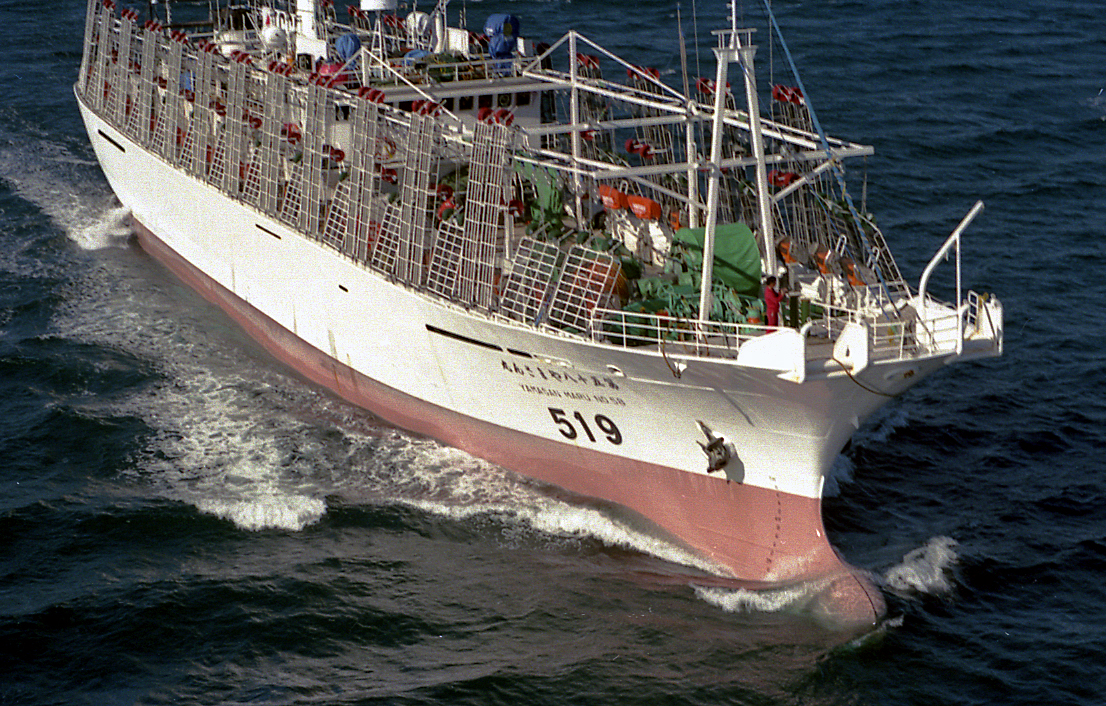
Japanese squid jigger

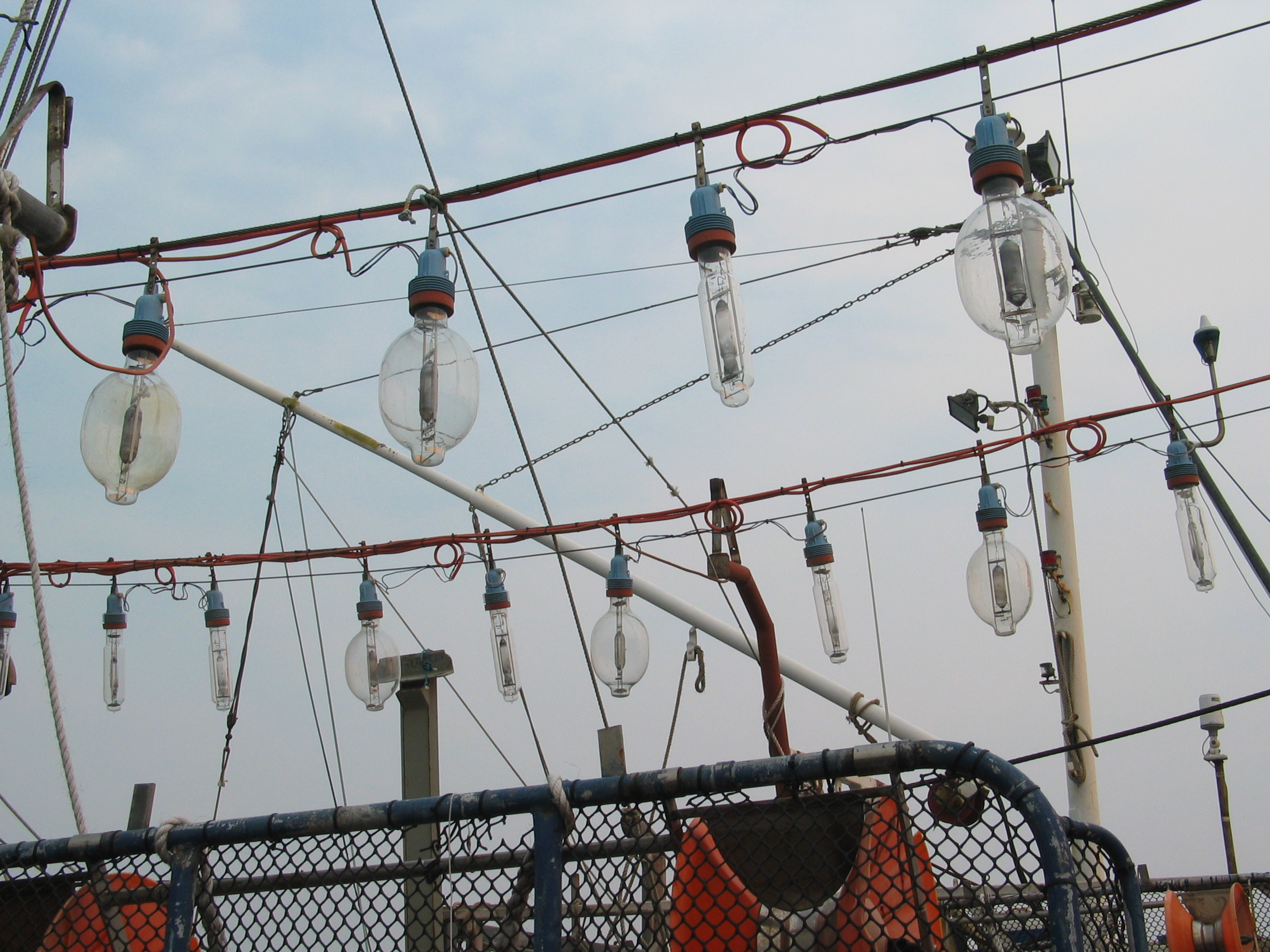
Electric lamps on squid jigger

- Jiggers – there are two types of jiggers: specialised squid jiggers which work mostly in the southern hemisphere and smaller vessels using jigging techniques in the northern hemisphere mainly for catching cod.
  - Squid jiggers – have single or double drum jigger winches lined along the rails around the vessel. Strong lamps, up to 5000 W each, are used to attract the squid. These are arranged 50–60 centimetres apart, either as one row in the centre of the vessel, or two rows, one on each side. As the squid are caught they are transferred by chutes to the processing plant of the vessel. The jigging motion can be produced mechanically by the shape of the drum or electronically by adjustment to the winch motor. Squid jiggers are often used during the day as midwater trawlers and during the night as jiggers.
  - Cod jiggers – use single jigger machines and do not use lights to attract the fish. The fish are attracted by the jigging motion and artificial bait.

=== Other vessels ===
- Dredgers – use a dredge for collecting molluscs from the seafloor. There are three types of dredges: (a) The dredge can be dragged along the seabed, scooping the shellfish from the ground. These dredges are towed in a manner similar to beam trawlers, and large dredgers can work three or more dredges on each side. (b) Heavy mechanical dredging units are operated by special gallows from the bow of the vessel. (c) The dredger employs a hydraulic dredge which uses a powerful water pump to operates water jets which flush the molluscs from the bottom. Dredgers don't have a typical deck arrangement, the bridge and accommodation can be aft or forward. Derricks and winches may be installed for lowering and lifting the dredge. Echosounders are used for determining depths.

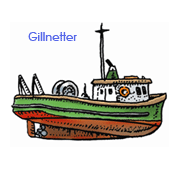

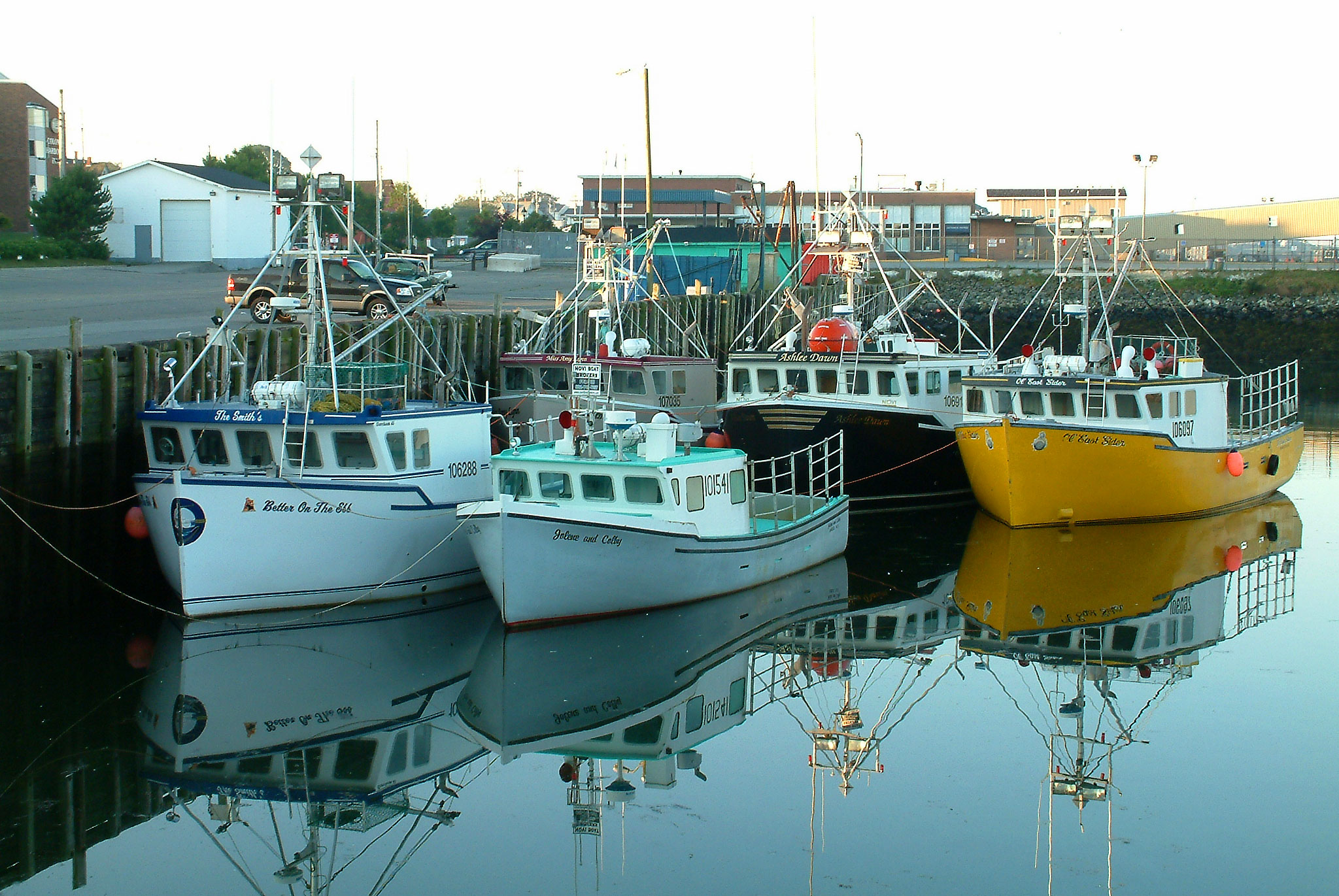
Lobster fishing boats

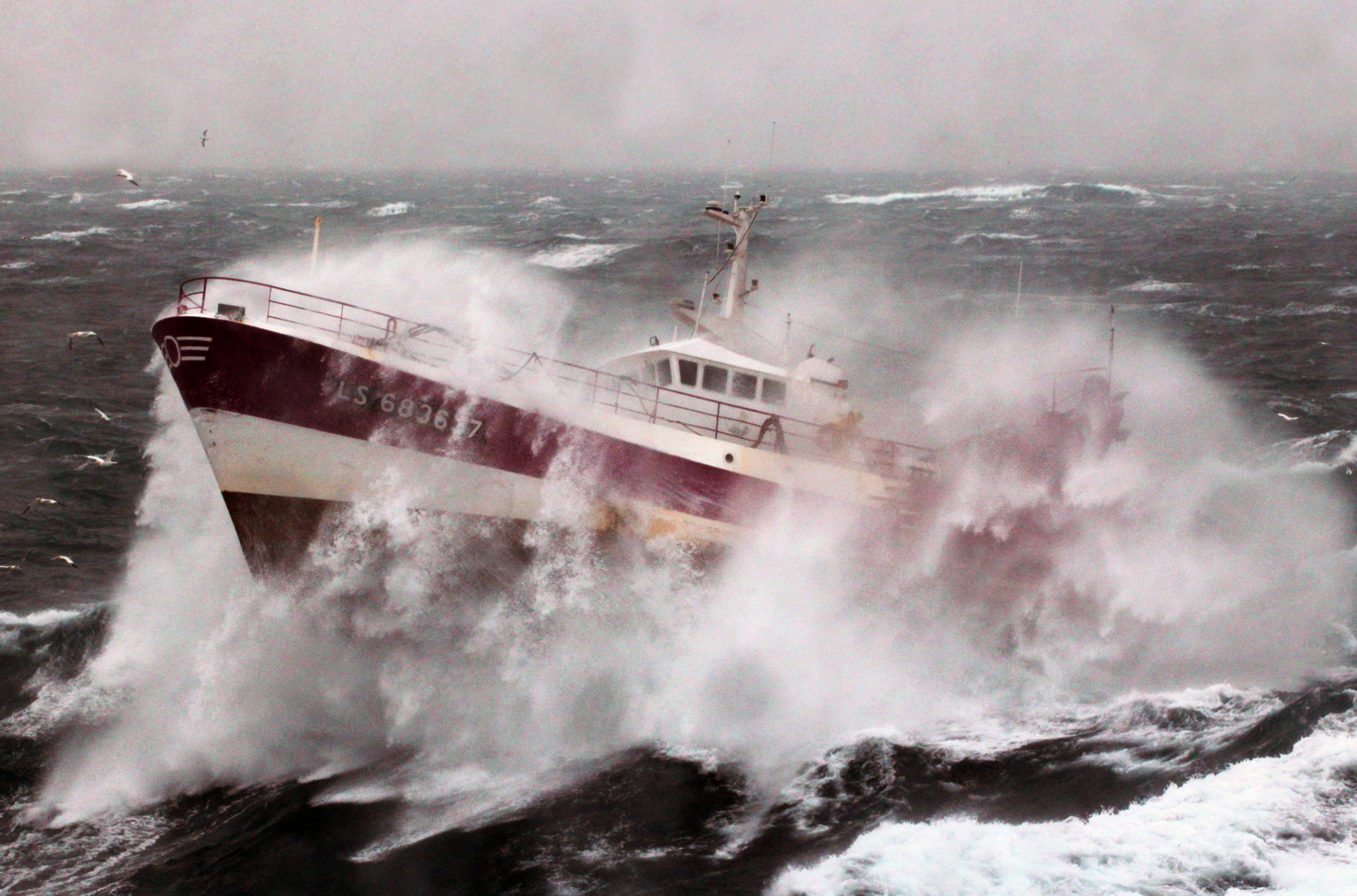
Fishing boat in a heavy sea

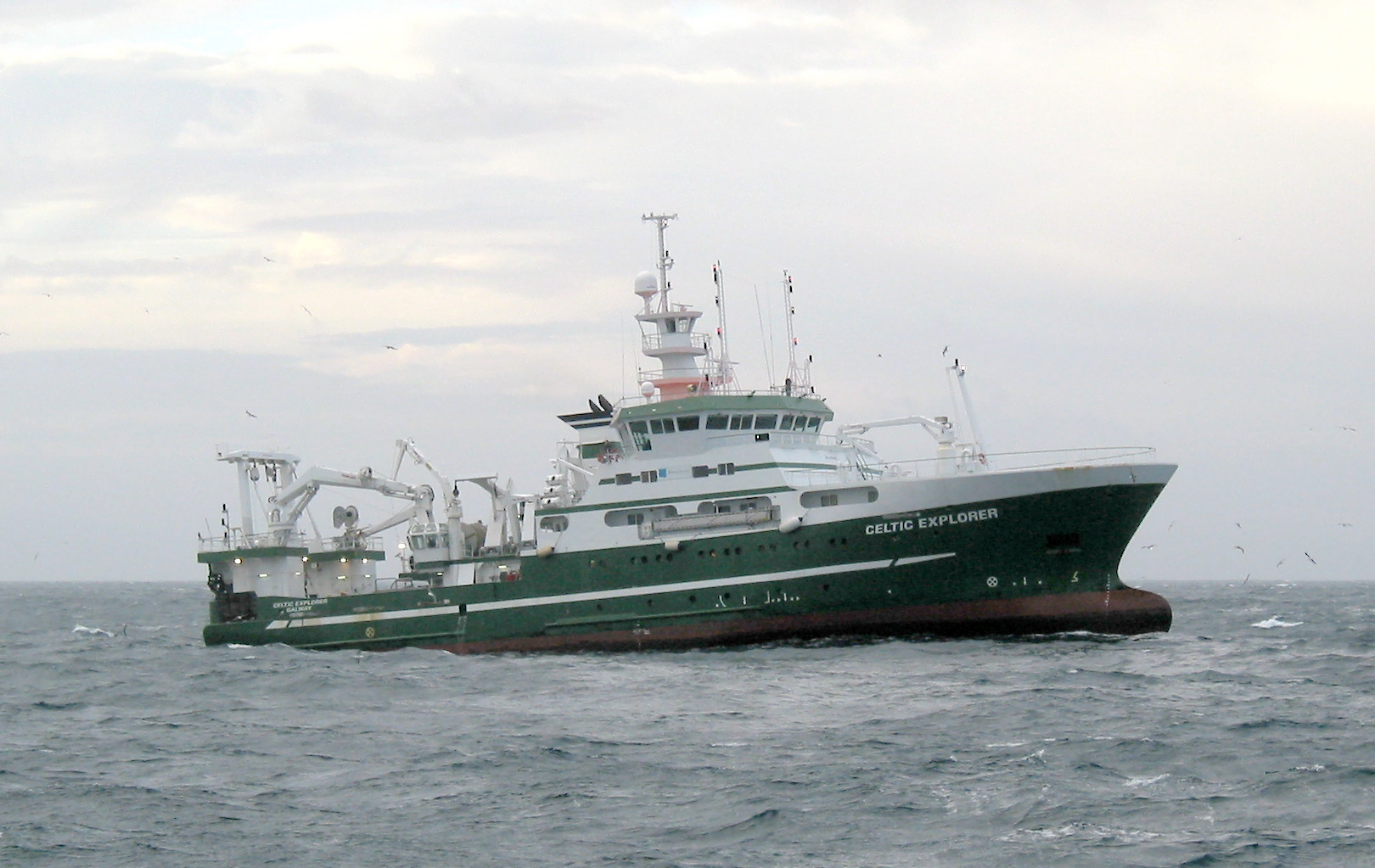
The fisheries research vessel RV Celtic Explorer

- Gillnetters – On inland waters and inshore, gillnets can be operated from open boats and canoes. In coastal waters, they are operated by small decked vessels which can have their wheelhouse either aft or forward. In coastal waters, gillnetting is often used as a second fishing method by trawlers or beam trawlers, depending on fishing seasons and targeted species. For offshore fishing, or fishing on the high seas, medium-sized vessels using drifting gillnets are called drifters, and the bridge is usually located aft. The nets are set and hauled by hand on small open boats. Larger boats use hydraulic or occasionally mechanical net haulers, or net drums. These vessels can be equipped with an echosounder, although locating fish is more a matter of the fishermen's personal knowledge of the fishing grounds rather than depending on special detection equipment.
  - Set netters – also operate gillnets. However, during fishing operations the vessel is not attached to the nets. The size of the vessels varies from open boats to large specialised drifters operating on the high seas. The wheelhouse is usually located aft, and the front deck is used for handling gear. Normally the nets are set at the stern by steaming ahead. Hauling is done over the side at the forepart of the deck, usually using hydraulic driven net haulers. Wet fish is packed in containers chilled with ice. Larger vessels might freeze the catch.
- Lift netters – are equipped to operate lift nets, which are held from the vessel's side and raised and lowered by means of outriggers. Lift netters range from open boats about 10 metres long to larger vessels with open ocean capability. Decked vessels usually have the bridge amidships. Larger vessels are often equipped with winches and derricks for handling the lifting lines, as well as outriggers and light booms. They can be fitted with powerful lights to attract and aggregate the fish to the surface. Open boats are usually unmechanized or use hand-operated winches. Electronic equipment, such as fishfinders, sonar and echo sounders are used extensively on larger boats.
- Trap setters – are used to set pots or traps for catching fish, crabs, lobsters, crayfish and other similar species. Trap setters range in size from open boats operating inshore to larger decked vessels, 20 to 50 metres long, operating out to the edge of the continental shelf. Small decked trap setters have the wheelhouse either forward or aft with the fish hold amidships. They use hydraulic or mechanical pot haulers. Larger vessels have the wheelhouse forward, and are equipped with derricks, davits or cranes for hauling pots aboard. Locating fish is often more a matter of the fishermen's knowledge of the fishing grounds rather than the use of special detection equipment. Decked vessels are usually equipped with an echosounder, and large vessels may also have a Loran or GPS.
- Handliners – are normally undecked vessels used for handlining (fishing with a line and hook). Handliners include canoes and other small or medium-sized vessels. Traditional handliners are less than 12 metres o/a, and do not have special gear handling, there is no winch or gurdy. Locating fish is left to the fishermen's personal knowledge of fishing grounds rather than the use of special electronic equipment. Non traditional handliners can set and haul using electrical or hydraulic powered reels. These mechanised reels are normally fastened to the gunwale or set on stanchions close to or overhanging the gunwale. They operate all over the world, some in shallow waters, some fishing up to 300 metres deep. No typical deck arrangement exists for handliners.
- Multipurpose vessels – are vessels which are designed so they can deploy more than one type of fishing gear without major modifications to the vessels. The fish detection equipment present on board also changes according to which fishing gear is being used.
  - Trawler/Purse seiners – are designed so the deck arrangement and equipment, including a suitable combination winch, can be used for both methods. Rollers, blocks, trawl gallows and purse davits need to be arranged so they control the lead of warps and pursing lines in such a way as to reduce the time needed to convert from one type to the other. Typical fish detection equipment includes a sonar and an echosounder. These vessels are usually designed as trawlers, since the power requirement for trawling is higher.
- Research vessels – a fisheries research vessel (FRV) requires platforms which are capable of towing different types of fishing nets, collecting plankton or water samples from a range of depths, and carrying acoustic fish-finding equipment. Fisheries research vessels are often designed and built along the same lines as a large fishing vessel, but with space given over to laboratories and equipment storage, as opposed to storage of the catch. An example of a fisheries research vessel is FRV Scotia.

== Artisan vessels ==
Artisan fishing is small-scale commercial or subsistence fishing, particularly practices involving coastal or island ethnic groups using traditional fishing techniques and traditional boats. This may also include heritage groups involved in customary fishing practices.

According to the FAO, at the end of 2004, the world fishing fleet consisted of about 4 million vessels, of which 2.7 million were undecked (open) boats. While nearly all decked vessels were mechanized, only one-third of the undecked fishing boats were powered, usually with outboard engines. The remaining 1.8 million boats were traditional craft of various types, operated by sail and oars.

These figures for small fishing vessels are probably under reported. The FAO compiles these figures largely from national registers. These records often omit smaller boats where registration is not required or where fishing licences are granted by provincial or municipal authorities.

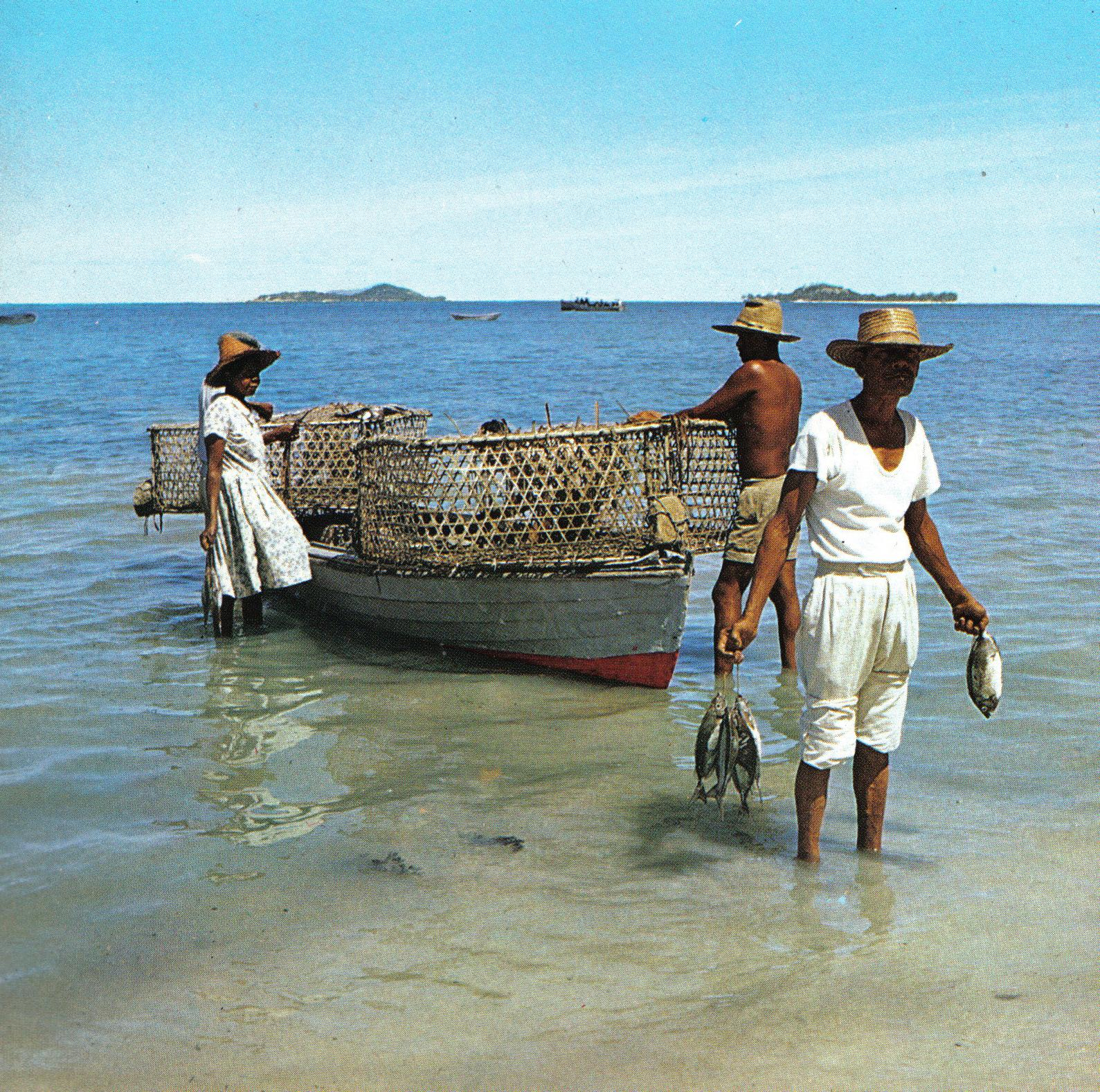
Fisherman landing his catch in the Seychelles.

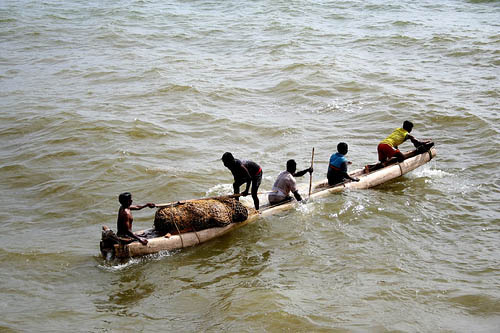
Indian split-log fishing canoe

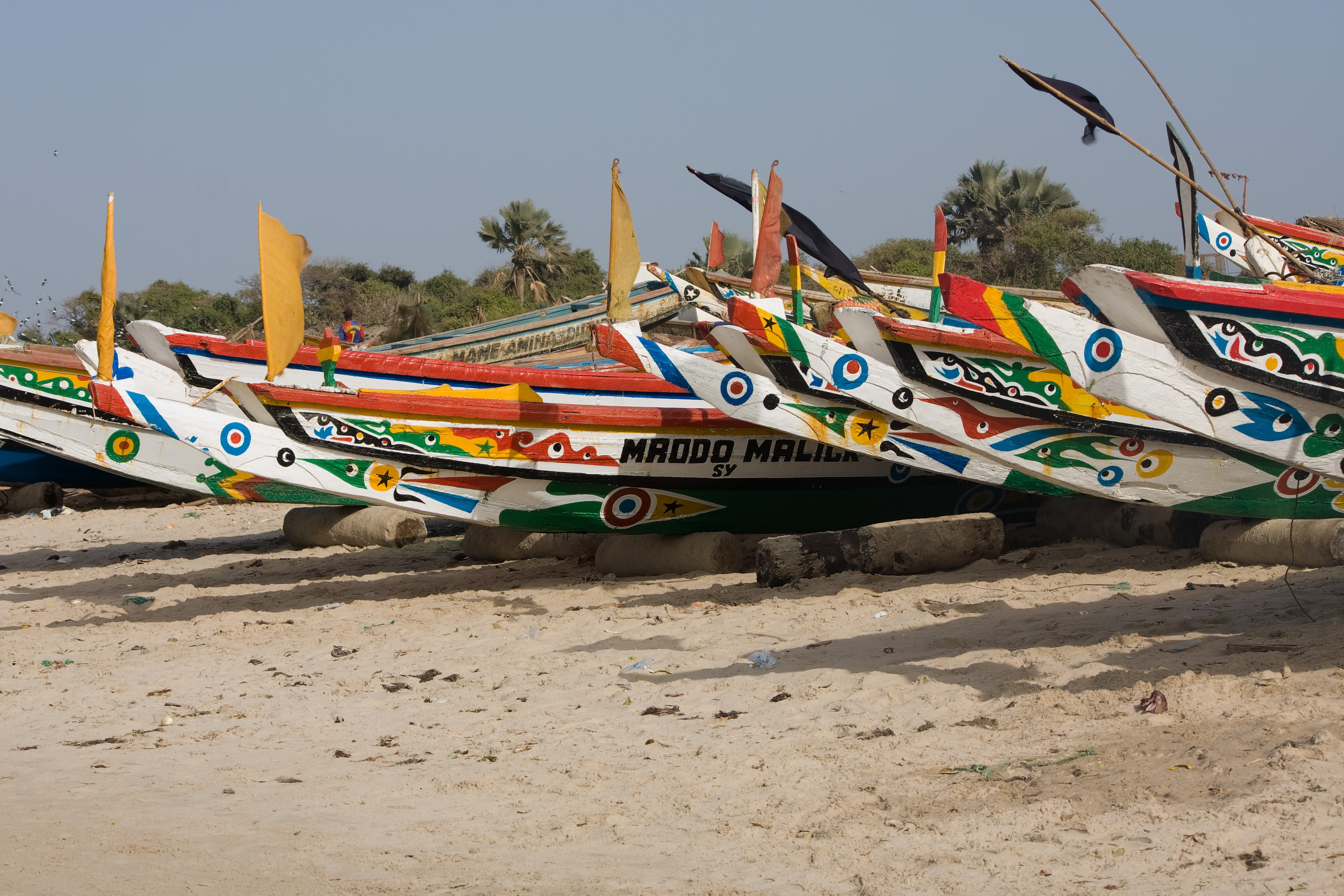
Senegalese fishing boats seen in the Gambian coasts.

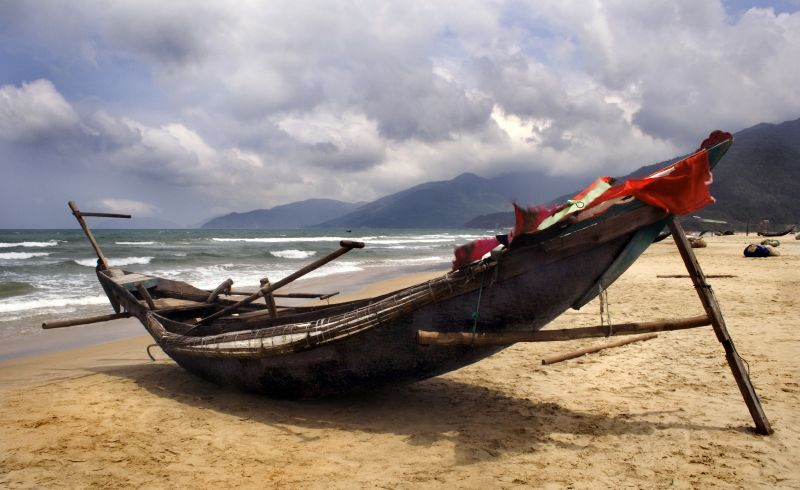
Traditional Vietnamese fishing boat

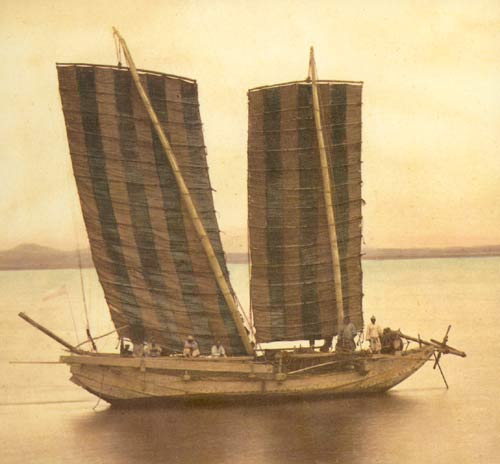
Fishing junk, 1871

Artisan fishing boats are usually small traditional fishing boats, appropriately designed for use on their local inland waters or coasts. Many localities around the world have developed their own traditional types of fishing boats, adapted to use local materials suitable for boat building and to the specific requirements of the fisheries and sea conditions in their area. Artisan boats are often open (undecked). Many have sails, but they do not usually use much, or any mechanised or electronic gear. Large numbers of artisan fishing boats are still in use, particularly in developing countries with long productive marine coastlines. For example, Indonesia has reported about 700,000 fishing boats, 25% of which are dugout canoes, and half of which are without motors. The Philippines have reported a similar number of small fishing boats. Many of the boats in this area are double-outrigger craft, consisting of a narrow main hull with two attached outriggers, commonly known as jukung in Indonesia and banca in the Philippines.

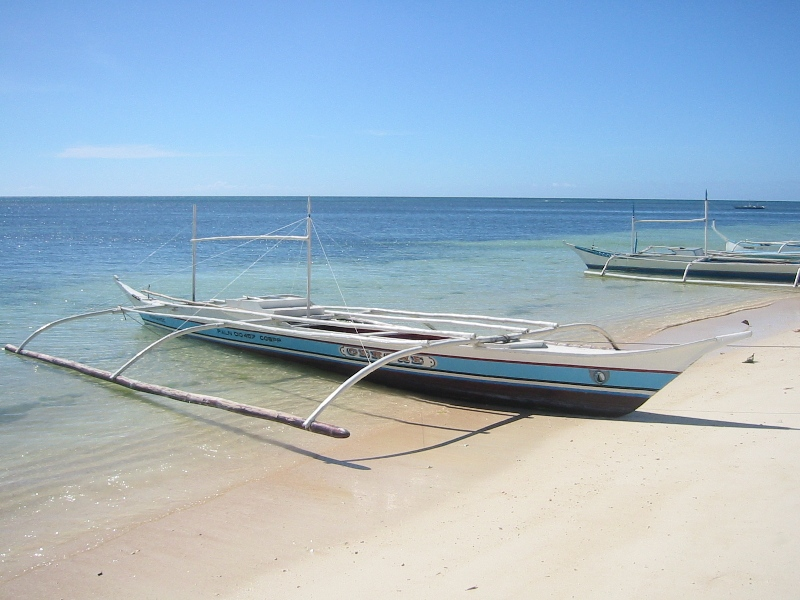
A small Philippine basnigan with the characteristic poles used for anchoring nets and holding gas-powered lamps for attracting fish

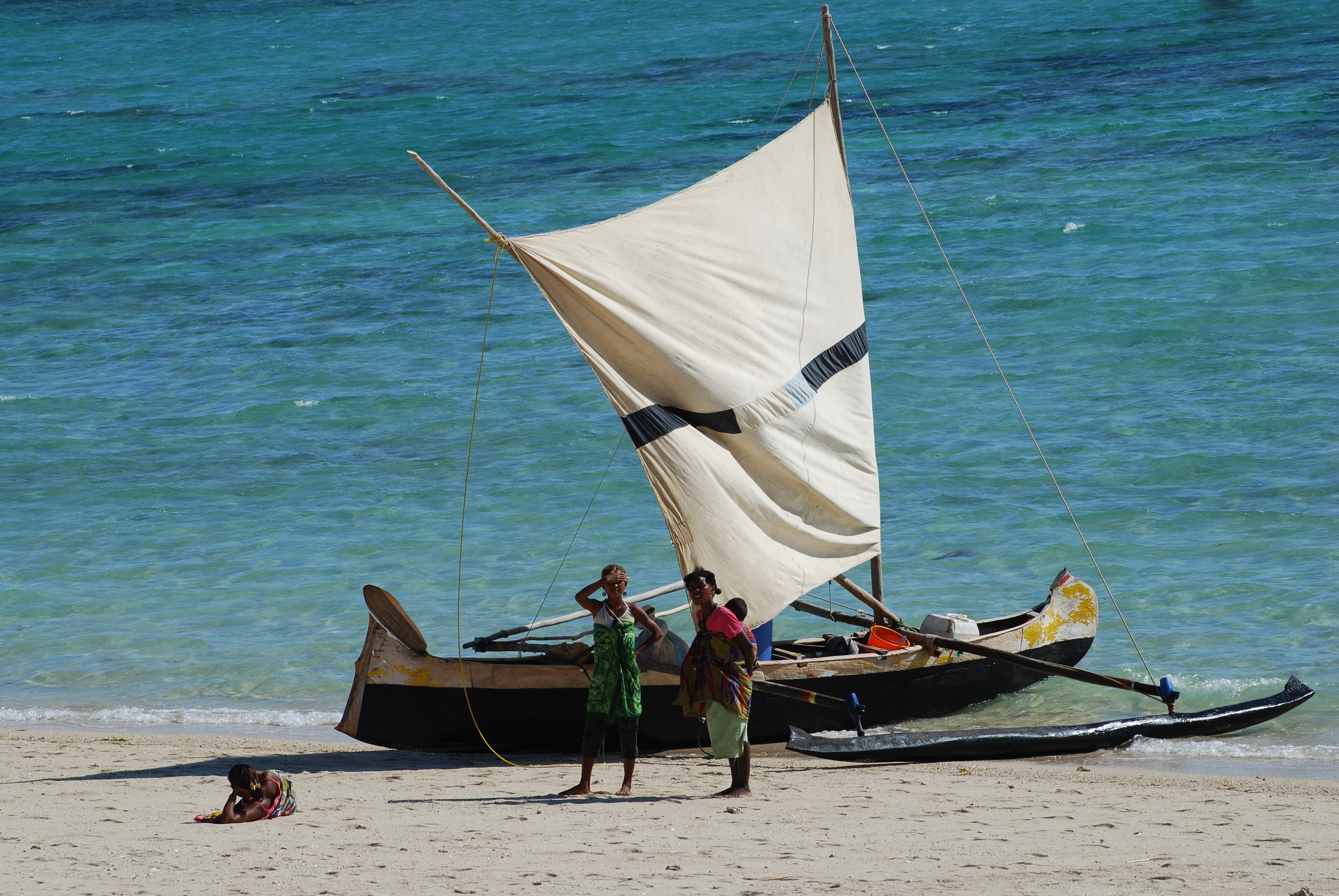
Traditional fishing lakana from Madagascar

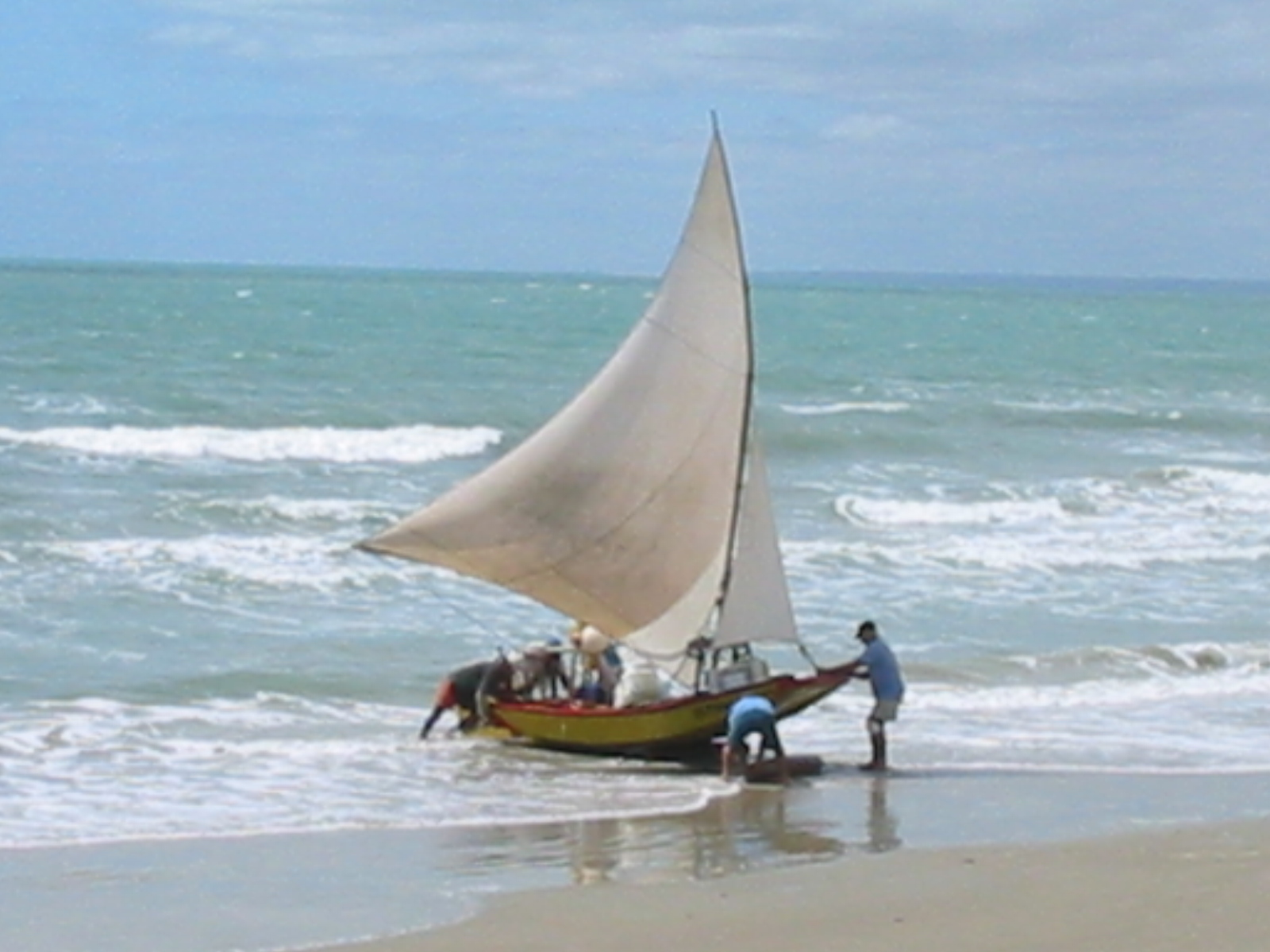
The elegant jangada on the coast off Mossoró in Brazil

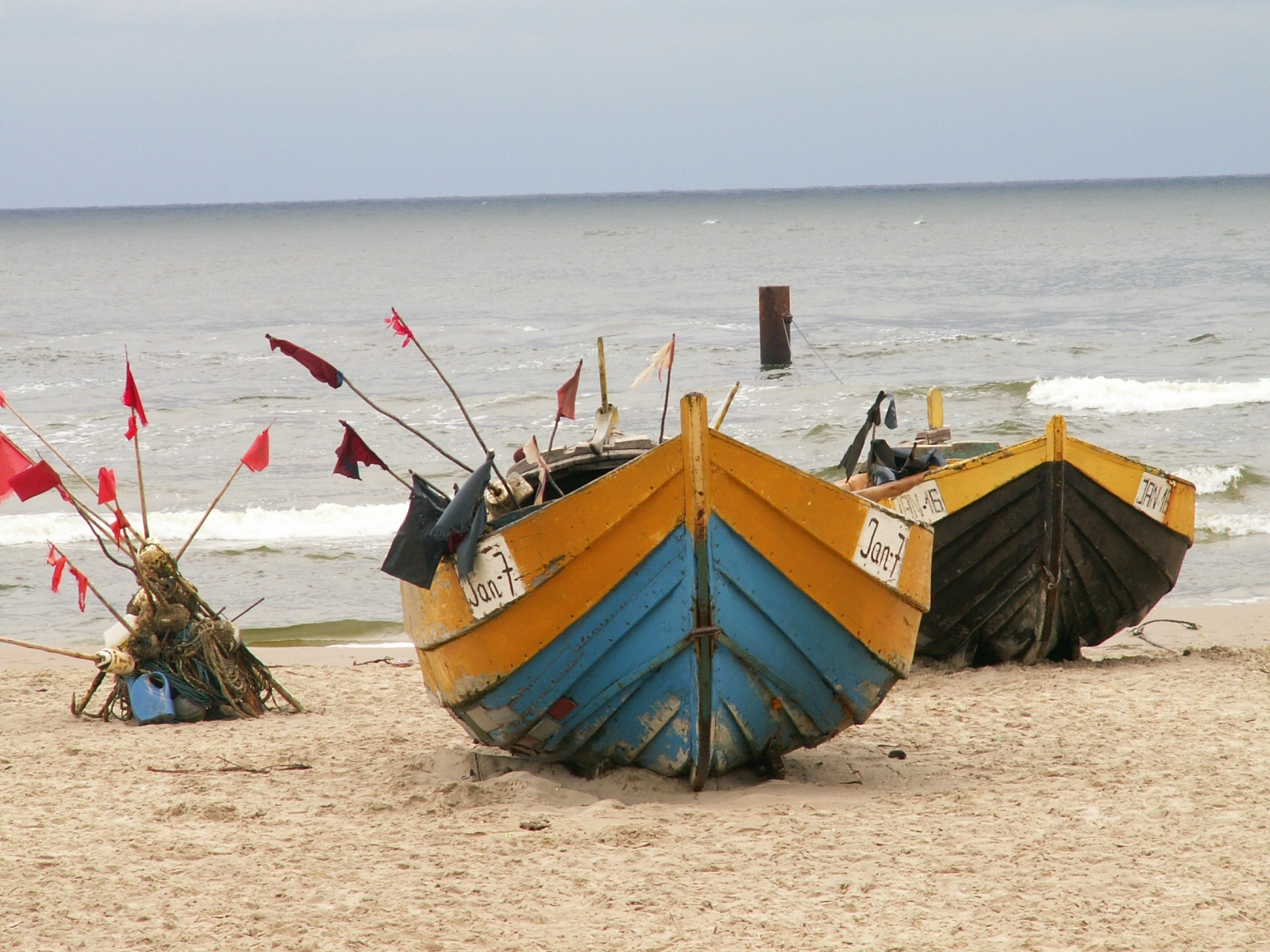
Indian clinker fishing boats

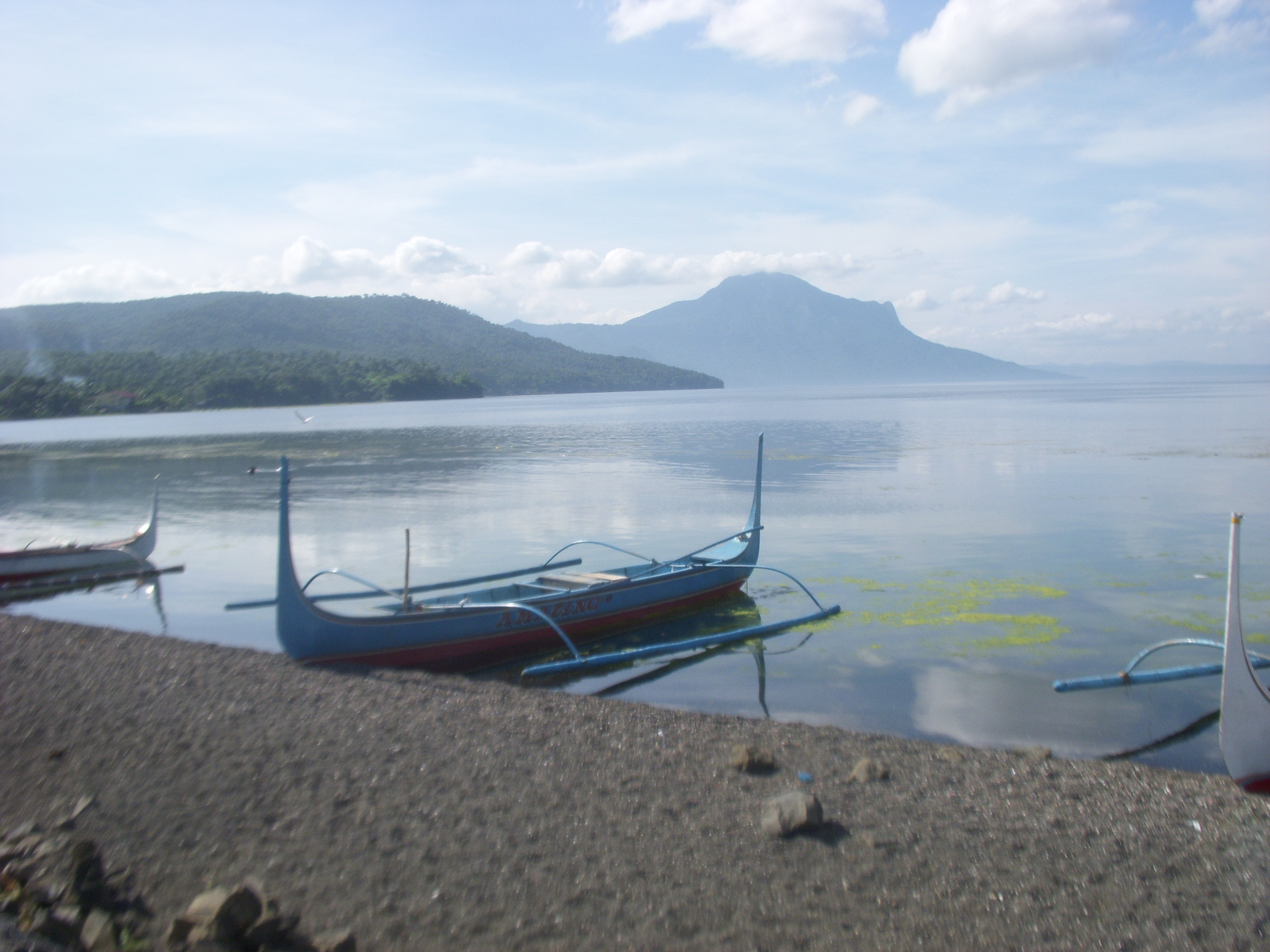
Traditional Philippine fishing outrigger canoes (bangka)

== Recreational vessels ==
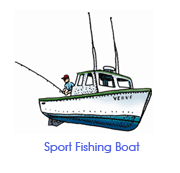

Recreational fishing is done for leisure or sport, and not for profit or survival. Just about anything that will stay afloat can be called a recreational fishing boat, so long as a fisherman periodically climbs aboard with the intent to catch fish. Usually some form of fishing tackle is brought on board, such as hooks and lines, rods and reels, sinkers or nets, and occasionally high-tech devices such as fishfinders and diving drones. Fish are caught for recreational purposes from boats that range from dugout canoes, kayaks, rafts, pontoon boats and small dinghies to runabouts, cabin cruisers and yachts to large, high-tech and luxurious big game boats sometimes fitted with outriggers. Larger boats, purpose-built with recreational fishing in mind, usually have large, open cockpits at the stern, designed for convenient fishing.

Big game fishing started as a sport after the invention of the motorized boat. Charles Frederick Holder, a marine biologist and early conservationist, is credited with founding the sport in 1898. Purpose-built game fishing boats appeared shortly after. An example is the Crete, in use at Catalina Island, California, in 1915, and shipped to Hawaii the following year. According to a newspaper report at that time, the Crete had "a deep cockpit, a chair fitted for landing big fish and leather pockets for placing the pole."

It is difficult to estimate how many recreational fishing boats there are, although the number is high. The term is fluid, since most recreational boats are also used for fishing from time to time. Unlike most commercial fishing vessels, recreational fishing boats are often not dedicated just to fishing, but also other water sports such as water skiing, parasailing and underwater diving.

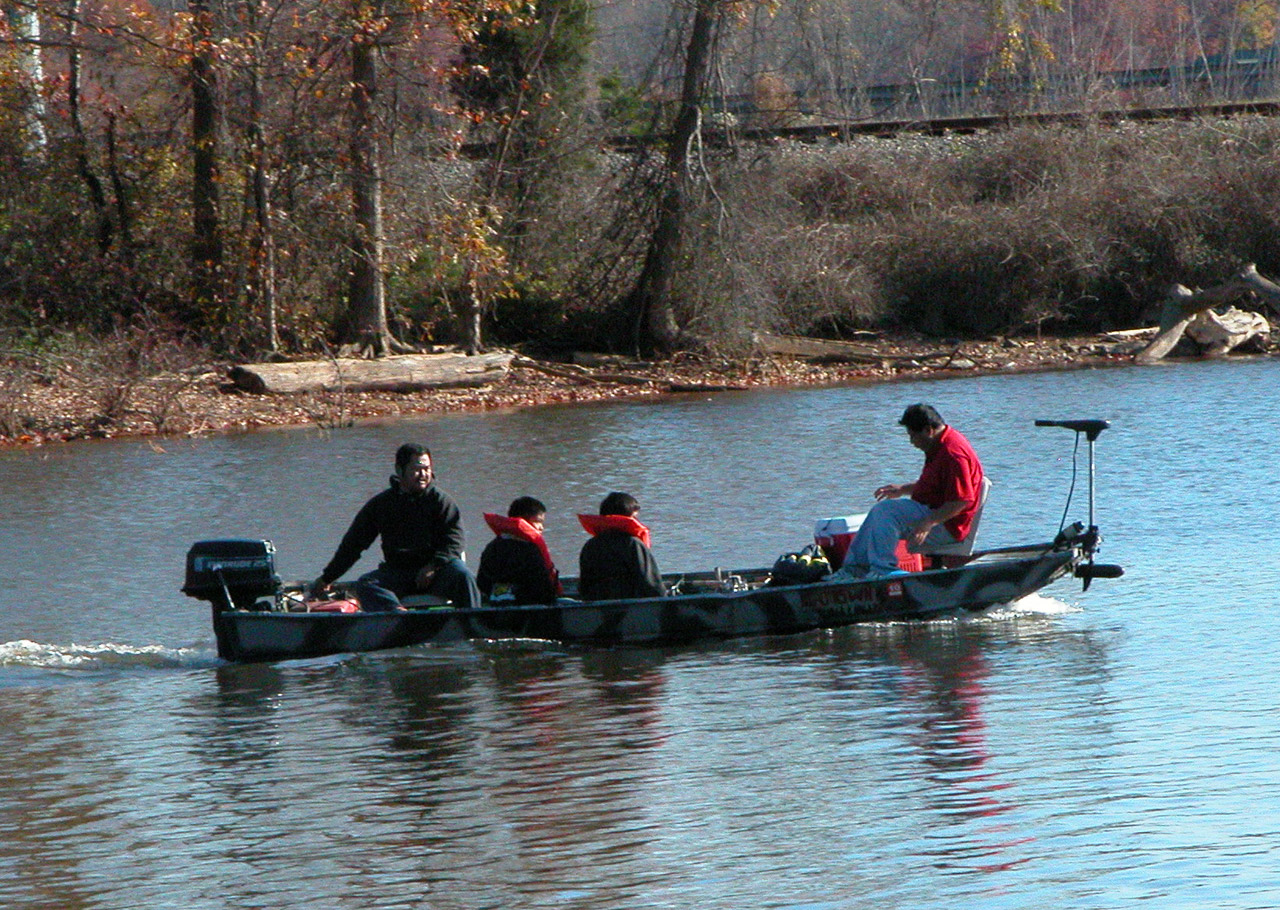
Standard aluminum bass boat, with trolling motor

- Fishing kayaks have gained popularity in recent years. The kayak has long been a means of accessing fishing grounds.
- Pontoon boats have also become popular in recent years. These boats allow one or two fishermen to get into small rivers or lakes that would have difficulty accommodating larger boats. Typically 8–12 ft in length, these inflatable craft can be assembled quickly and easily. Some feature rigid frames derived from the white water rafting industry.
- Bass boats are small aluminium or fibreglass motorboats used in freshwater lakes and rivers in the United States. for fishing bass and other panfish. They have a flat front deck, swivel chairs for the anglers, storage bins for fishing tackle, and a live well with recirculating water to keep caught fish alive. They are usually fitted with an outboard motor and a slower trolling motor, as well fishfinder and GPS navigation.
- Charter boats are often privately operated, purpose-built fishing boats, and host guided fishing trips for paying clients. Their size can range widely depending on the type of trips run and the geographical location.
- Freshwater fishing boats account for approximately one third of all registered boats in the USA. Most other types of boats end up being used for fishing on occasion.
- Saltwater fishing boats vary widely in size and can be specialized for certain species of fish. Flounder boats, for example, have flat bottoms for a shallow draft and are used in protected, shallow waters. Sport fishing boats range from 25 to 80 feet or more, and can be powered by large outboard engines or inboard diesels. Boats used for fishing in cold climates may have space dedicated to a cuddy cabin or enclosed wheelhouse, while boats in warmer climates are more likely to be open.
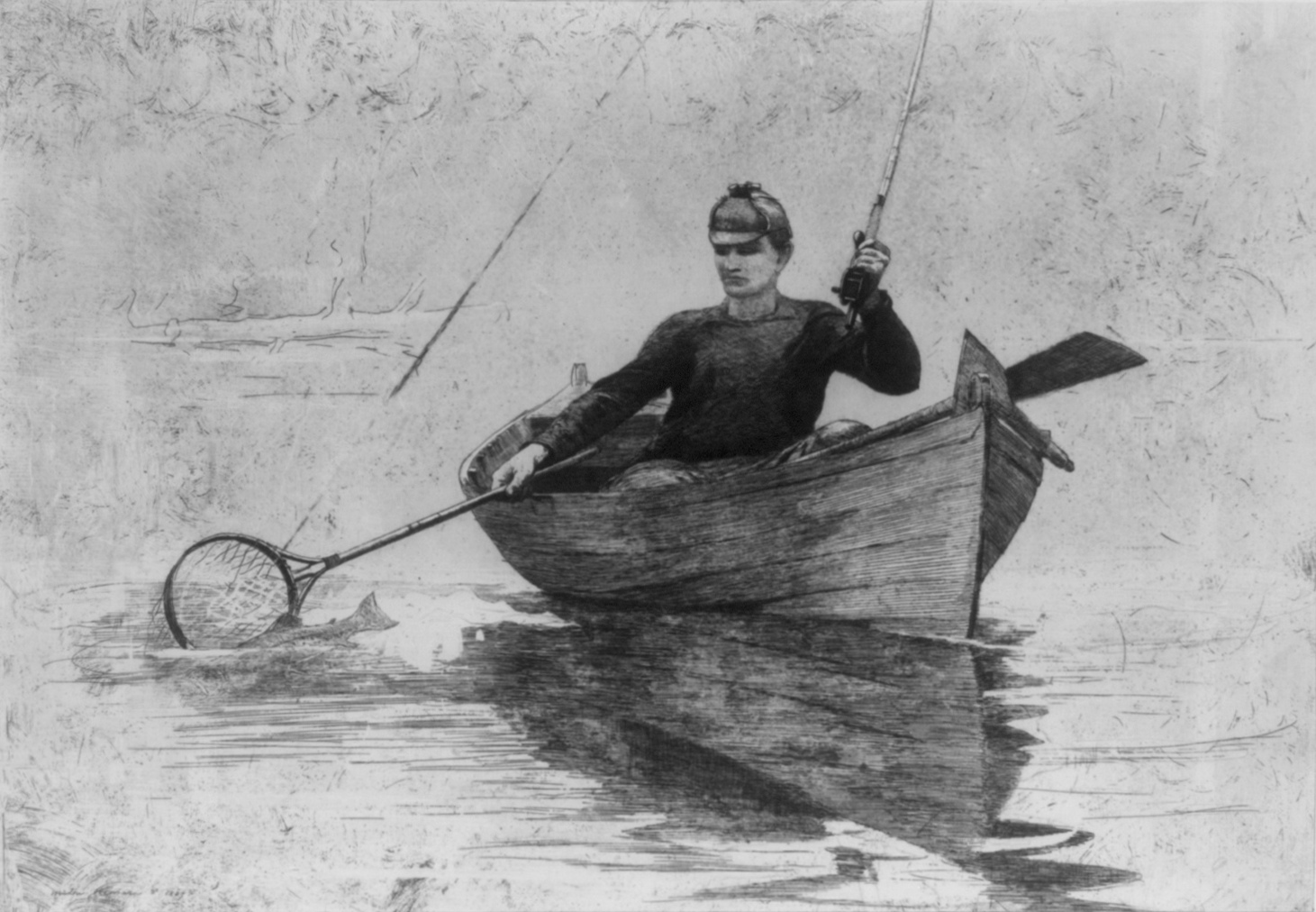
Fly fishing from a dinghy

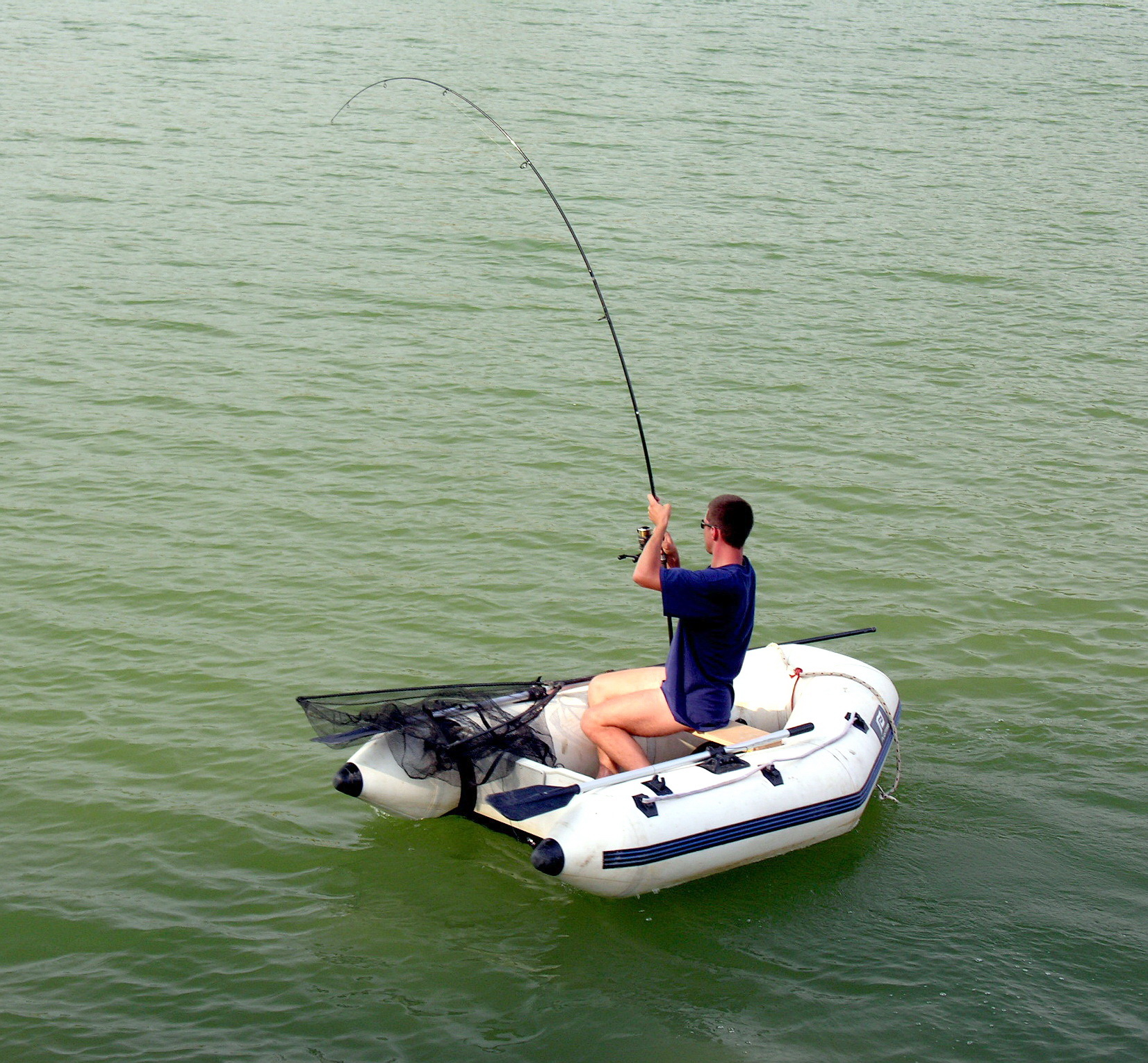
Angling from a small inflatable on Saint-Cassien's lake, France

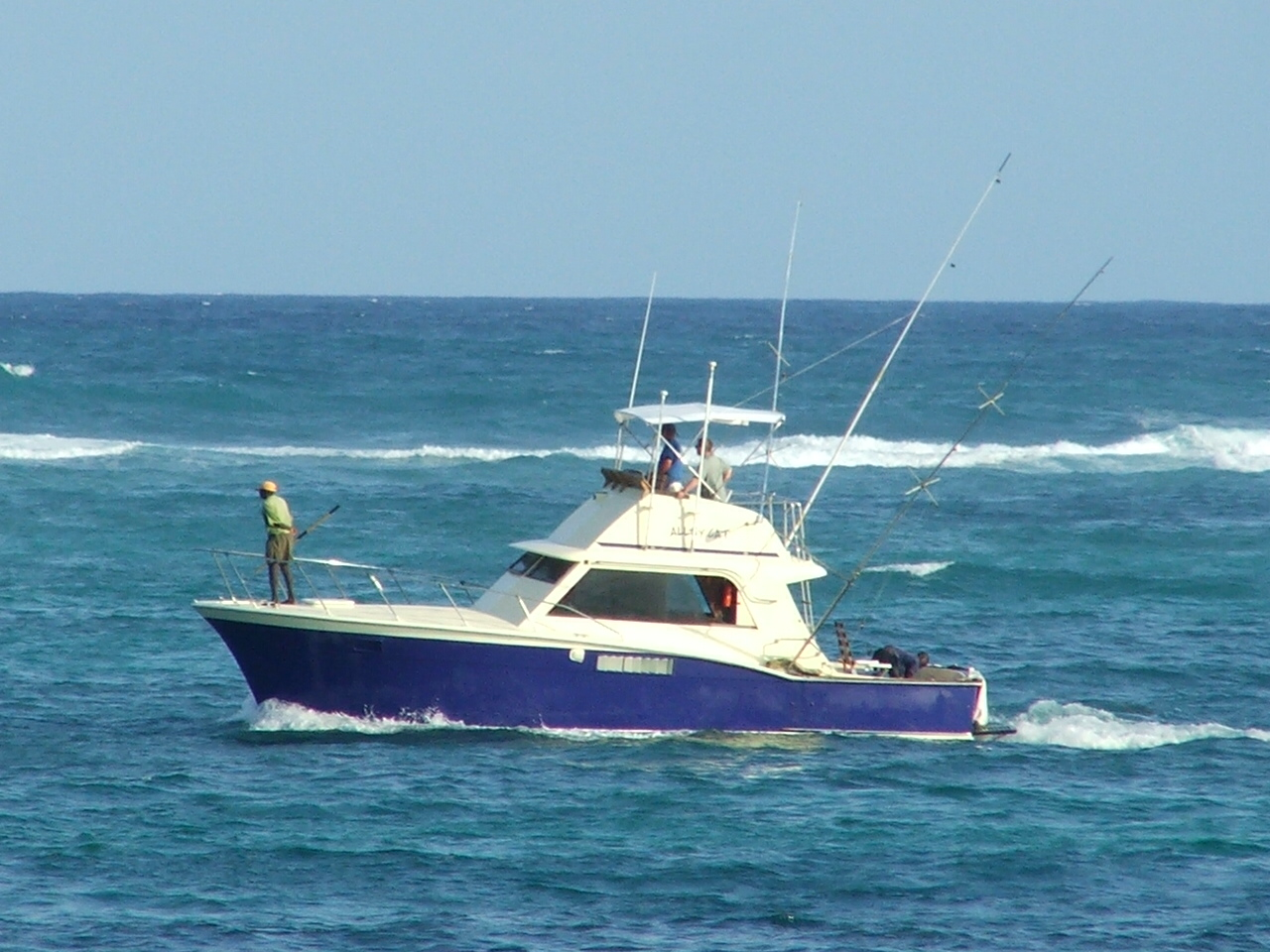
Small sport fishing boat

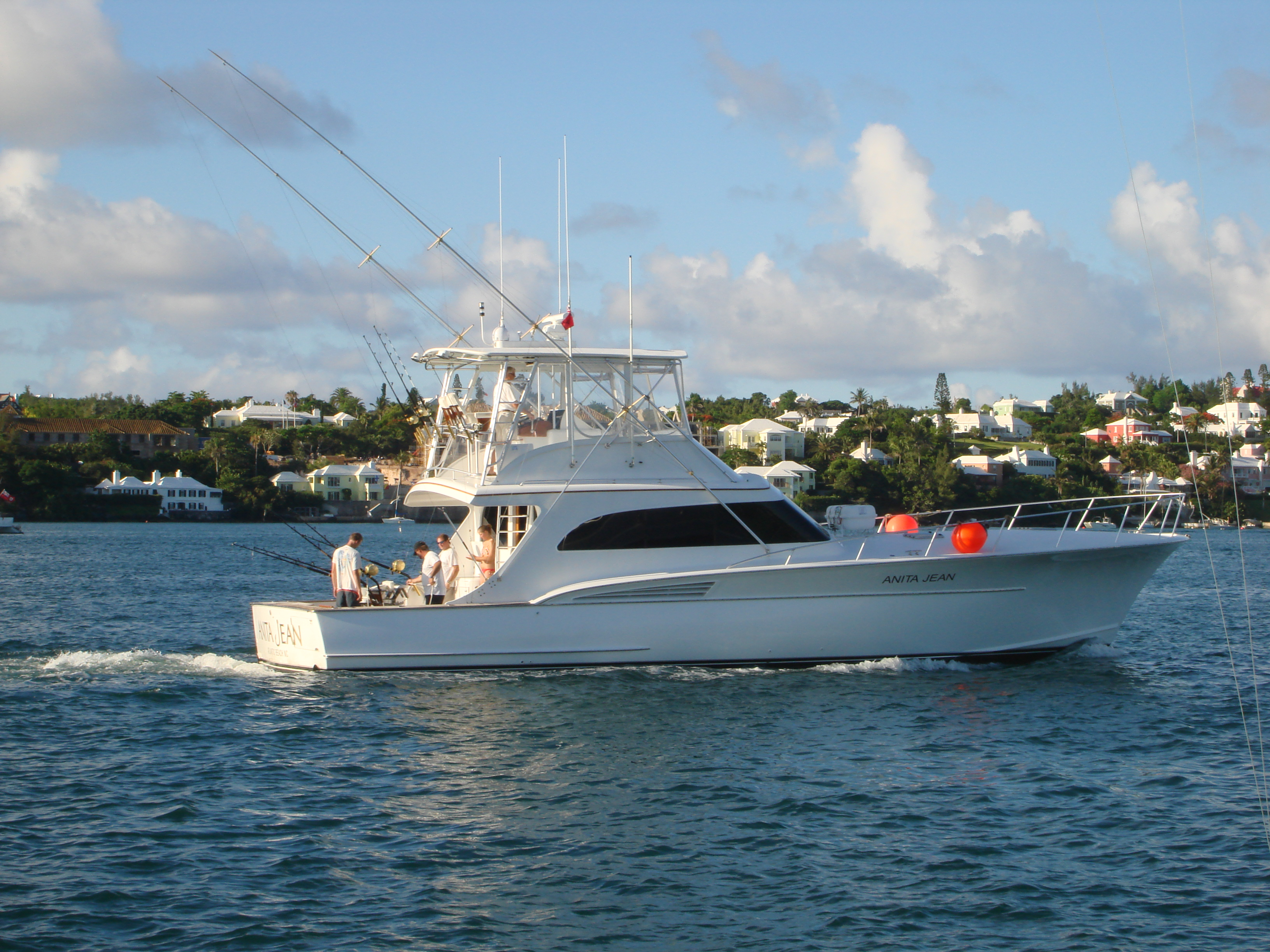
A larger charter big game rig in Bermuda.

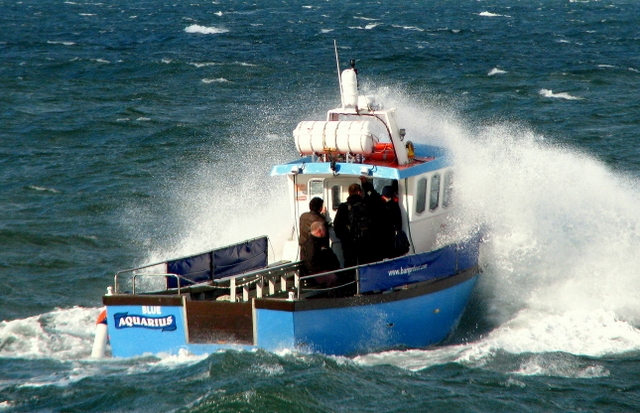

== See also ==
- Factory ship
- Maritime history of the United Kingdom
- Shetland bus boats
- Traditional fishing boat
- Western Flyer (boat)
- Pinasse from the Arcachon basin

== Sources ==
This article incorporates text from a free content work. Licensed under CC BY 4.0 (license statement/permission). Text taken from The State of World Fisheries and Aquaculture 2026, Food and Agriculture Organization of the United Nations.

This article incorporates text from a free content work. Licensed under CC BY 4.0 (license statement/permission). Text taken from The State of World Fisheries and Aquaculture 2024, FAO.
