= Life-saving appliances =

Maritime safety appliances

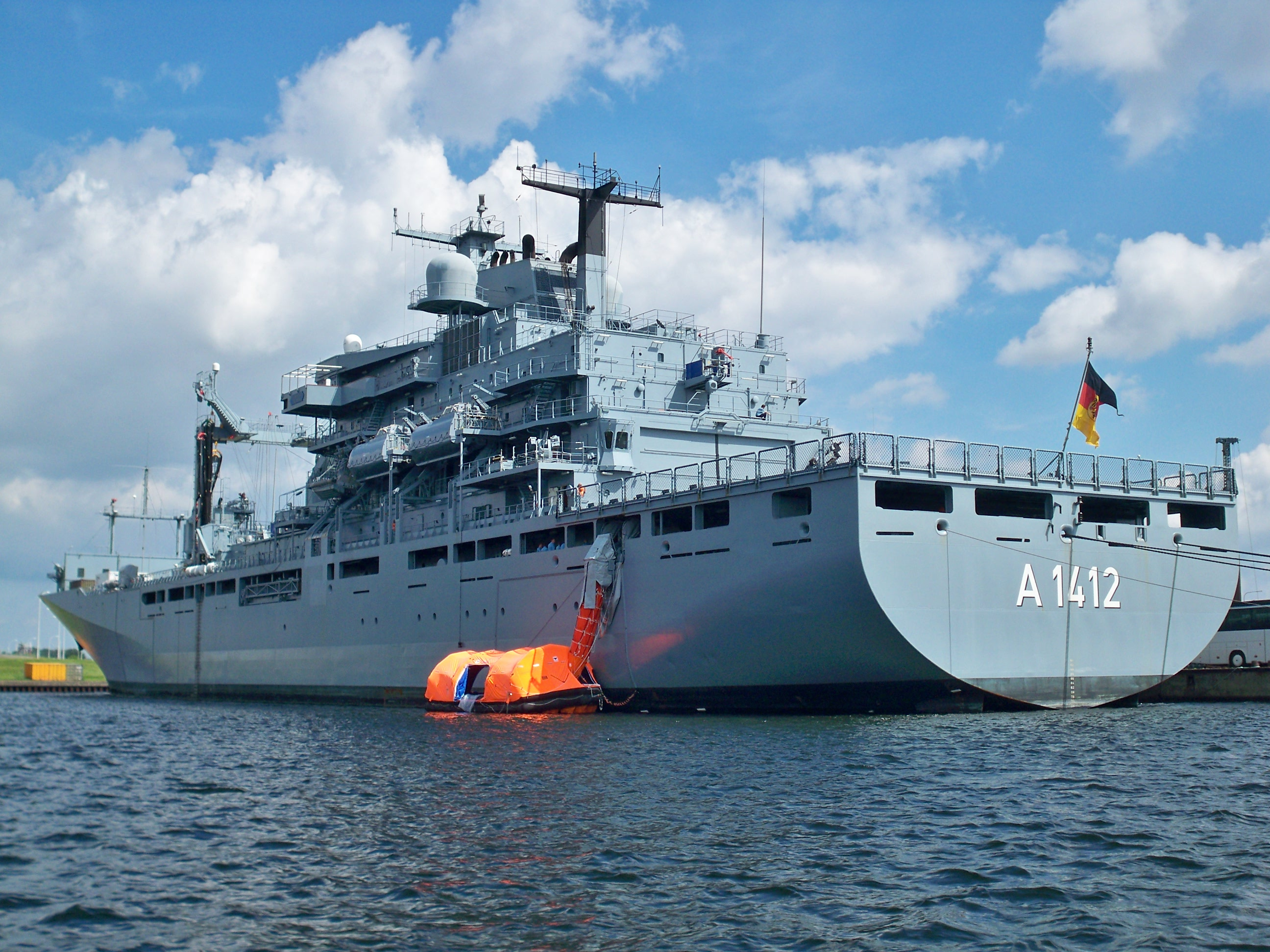

Life-saving appliances are appliances that protect human life at sea. The devices are documented as part of the International Convention for the Safety of Life at Sea, or SOLAS Convention.

== Types ==
In the SOLAS Convention and other maritime related standards, the safety of human life is paramount. Ships and other watercraft carry life saving appliances including lifeboats, lifebuoys, life-jackets, life raft and many others. Passengers and crew are informed of their availability in case of emergency. Life-saving appliances are mandatory as per chapter 3 of the SOLAS Convention. The International Life-Saving Appliance (LSA) Code gives specific technical requirements for the manufacture, maintenance and record keeping of life-saving appliances. The number and type of life-saving appliances differ from vessel to vessel, and the code gives a minimum requirement to comply in order to make a ship seaworthy.

=== Life-saving appliances include ===
- Lifebuoys and life-jackets
- Immersion suits, anti-exposure suits and thermal protective aids
- Lifeboats
- Life-rafts
- Rescue boats
- Rocket parachute flares
- Hand flares
- Buoyant smoke signals
- Launching and embarkation appliances
- Marine evacuation systems
- Line-throwing appliances
- General emergency alarm system
- Public address system
