= Muletta =

Portuguese fishing trawler

Muletta

A muletta is a variety of Portuguese fishing trawler, a sailing ship used to catch fish by means of large nets. They are between 45 and 60 feet (14 and 18 m) long, with an average of about 50 feet (15 m), and are crewed by between 10 and 18 sailors. Its carvel-built hull, sail plan, and rigging are unusual for a sailing vessel: the hull is slightly concave along the keel, allowing the ship to be beached upright and giving it a greater draught when tipped ("heeled") than when upright, the bows are nearly always painted with large eyes (a holdover from the Ancient Greek practice of doing so), and it has a series of small spikes above the waterline at the stem in a curved vertical row; it is principally lateen rigged on its single short mast, but forward of this it carries a number of square rigged sails called water sails which project from two additional mast-like spars and which reach nearly to the water, and behind the mast it has a long low boom to which is attached the clew of an additional triangular sail as well as the clew of a second triangular sail, both fore-and-aft rigged.
