= Bermuda Police Service =

Police service in Bermuda

Agency overview
- Formed: 1879

Jurisdictional structure
- Operations jurisdiction: Bermuda
- Area: 53 square kilometres (20 sq mi)
- Population: 66,000
- General nature: Civilian police

Operational structure
- Headquarters: Hamilton
- Sworn members: 468
- Agency executive: Darrin Simons, Acting Commissioner of Police

Facilities
- Stations: 4

Website
- www.bermudapolice.bm

The Bermuda Police Service is the law enforcement agency of the British Overseas Territory and former Imperial fortress of Bermuda.

== Overview ==
The BPS is responsible for policing the entire archipelago, including incorporated municipalities, and the surrounding waters. It is part of, and entirely funded by, the Government of Bermuda.

Like the Royal Bermuda Regiment, it is under the nominal control of the territory's Governor and Commander in Chief, although, for day-to-day purposes, control is delegated to a minister of the local government.

It was created in 1879, as Bermuda's first professional police service. In organisation, operation, and dress, it was created and has developed in line with the patterns established by British Isles police services, such as the City of Glasgow Police, and the Metropolitan Police Service.

== History ==
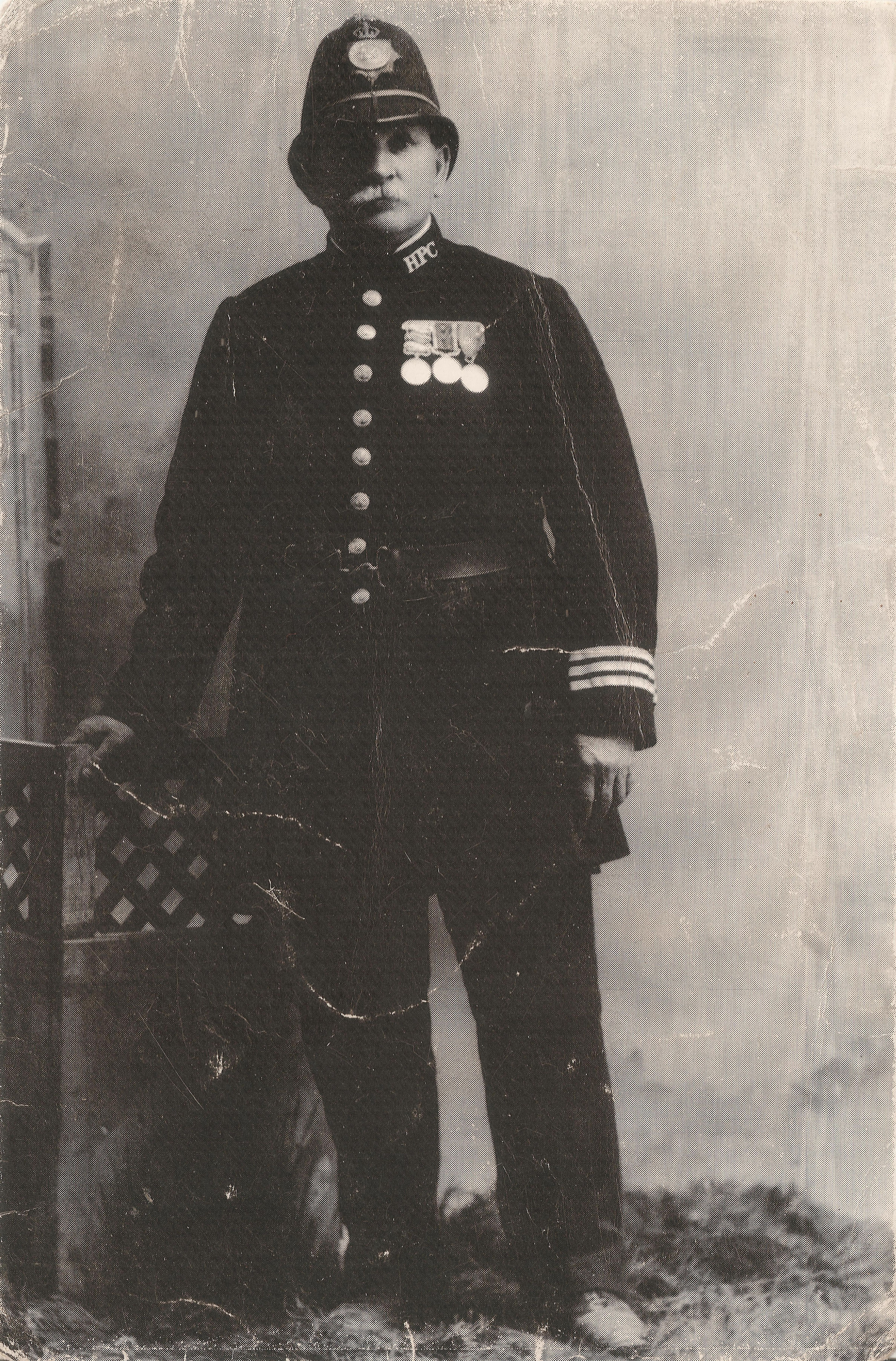
Hamilton Police Constable Thomas James Powell, c. 1890

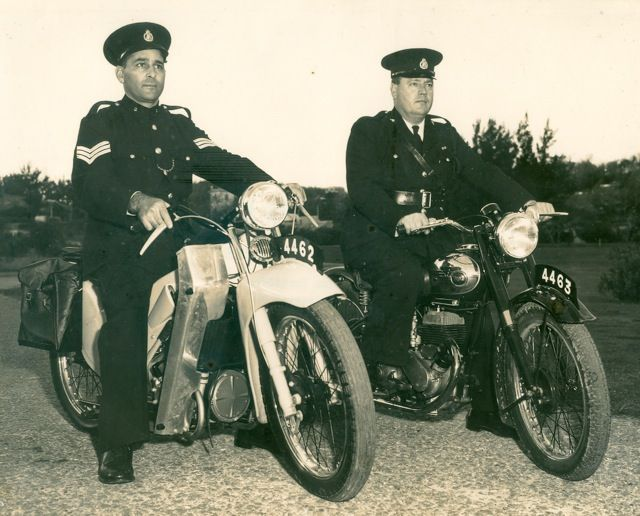
Sergeant John Marshall and Inspector Leonard Fearis on motorcycles in 1953

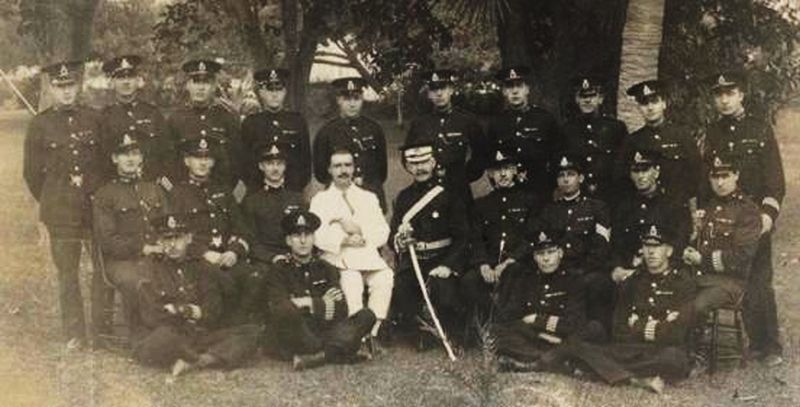
Bermuda Police Force personnel in 1920

Bermuda's first police, from settlement until 1879, had been nine parish constables (one for each parish). As had been the case in England, these positions were filled by men appointed for twelve months, unpaid service, until pay was introduced in the 19th century. These appointments were compulsory, akin to jury service.

Dissatisfaction with the quality of this part-time constabulary led to the formation of the Bermuda Police Force under the Police Establishment Act, 1879. The new body consisted of ten full-time constables under Superintendent J. C. B. Clarke. Three of the constables were based in Hamilton, with Clarke, three in St. George's, with Chief Constable H. Dunkley, and two in Somerset, and there were still twenty-one part-time parish constables.

The size of the police force was trebled in 1901. The first detective was appointed in 1919, and the force was reorganised again in 1920, with eighteen constables recruited from the UK raising its strength to forty-six. The size of the force grew steadily over the following decades.

The Bermuda Reserve Constabulary was created in 1951. After the reduction of Bermuda's Royal Naval Dockyard (which had had its own police force) to a base in 1951, and the associated withdrawal of regular British Army units of the Bermuda Garrison in 1957 (leaving only part-time units), Police Headquarters and other elements relocated to Prospect Camp, the former military headquarters. A Women's Department was established in 1961 with the first five female police officers. A marine section was formed in 1962, with its first large boat, the Heron, being built by police officers in their spare time.

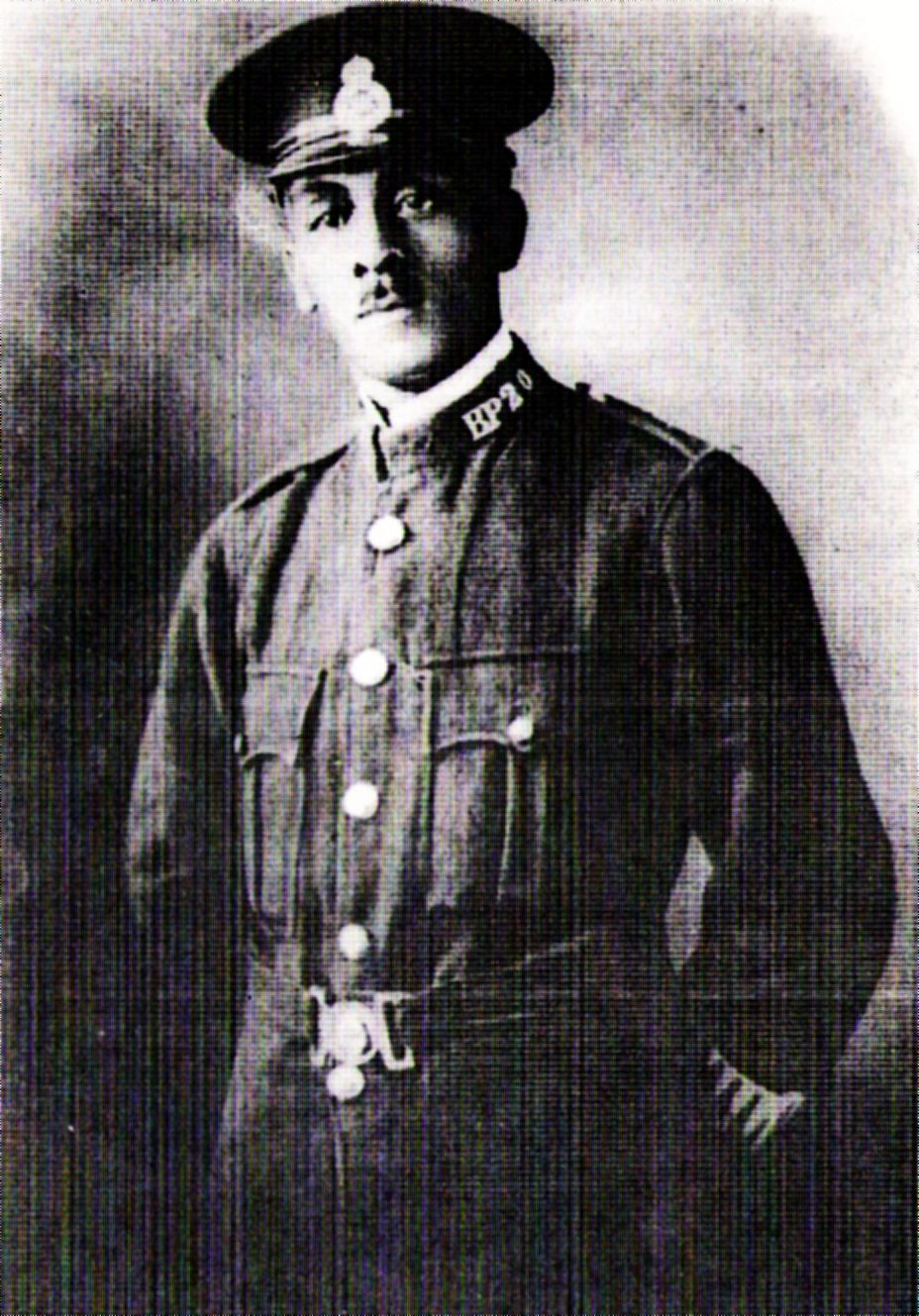
Parish Constable PC Edward 'Field' Williams, circa 1920

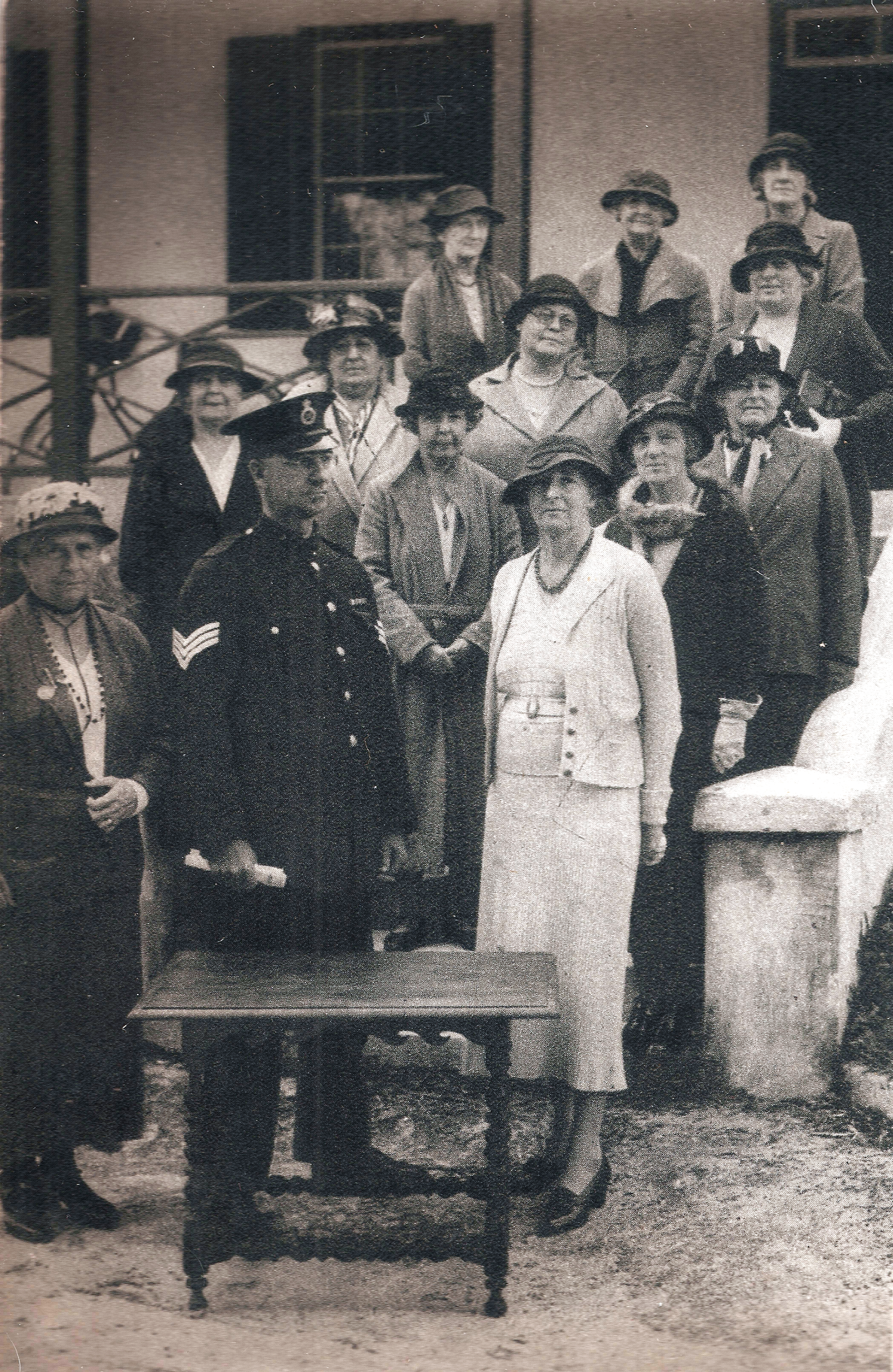
A Police Sergeant confiscates women's suffrage activist Gladys Morrell's table in the 1930s

The difficulty recruiting constables locally had led to increased intake of constables from the British Isles, such as William Joseph Cormack (who came to the force from the Staffordshire County Police in 1955, and would go on to become Chief of the Metropolitan Toronto Police from 1989 to 1995), which resulted in criticism of the racial make up of the force not reflecting that of the wider community. The reasons for failing to obtain the necessary local recruits, black or white, was attributed to a number of factors, including the small population, but primarily the reluctance among those islanders who were likely to meet the physical and educational requirements to choose a career in public service, especially the police. As recorded in the official "Bermuda Report for the year 1971":

Bermuda is an affluent society in which persons who would otherwise qualify for service in the Police Force can obtain equally or more lucrative positions in the business world, without being subjected to the disciplined existence of a policeman, entailing as it does working shifts on Sundays and Public Holidays. Bermudians are recognised as being very much individualists who resent restrictions on their freedoms. Many local Bermudians are used to holding down two jobs in order to earn extra money, a practice not permitted in the Police Force. But above all, in a small community such as Bermuda, service in the Police force which means service amongst friends and relatives whom it may be necessary to report and arrest is not popular.

As the resultant heavy reliance on recruitment of trained constables from the British Isles resulted in friction between the police force and part of the community due to the racial imbalance, in 1966 the Bermuda Police Force began also recruiting constables from British West Indian police forces, starting with seven constables from Barbados. Although the practice of recruiting from the British West Indies would continue, it was not deemed entirely successful. As the "Bermuda Report for the year 1971" continued:

More recently police have been recruited from the Caribbean with a view to correcting the racial imbalance in the force. This has not been particularly successful, Bermudians regarding West Indians as much, if not more, expatriate as recruits from the United Kingdom, which has been and remains the main source of recruitment.

The force consequently took a number of measures intended to encourage local recruitment, and the promotion of locally recruited officers. These steps included heavy police involvement in various youth programmes, with a member of the force seconded to the Government Youth Service, and the institution of a Police Cadet scheme in the colony's secondary schools from 1972, similarly to the military Bermuda Cadet Corps.

=== Internal security ===
In the 1960s the Bermuda Police performed a new role: internal security, dealing with riots resulting from the struggle for racial equality. This culminated in 1977 with riots following the hanging of two members of the Black Beret Cadre convicted of five murders, including those of Governor Richard Sharples, his aide-de-camp Captain Hugh Sayers, and the Commissioner of Police George Duckett. The death penalty had not been used in Bermuda for three decades. As the two men convicted were black, many blacks saw the death sentences as racially motivated.

=== Renaming as Bermuda Police Service ===
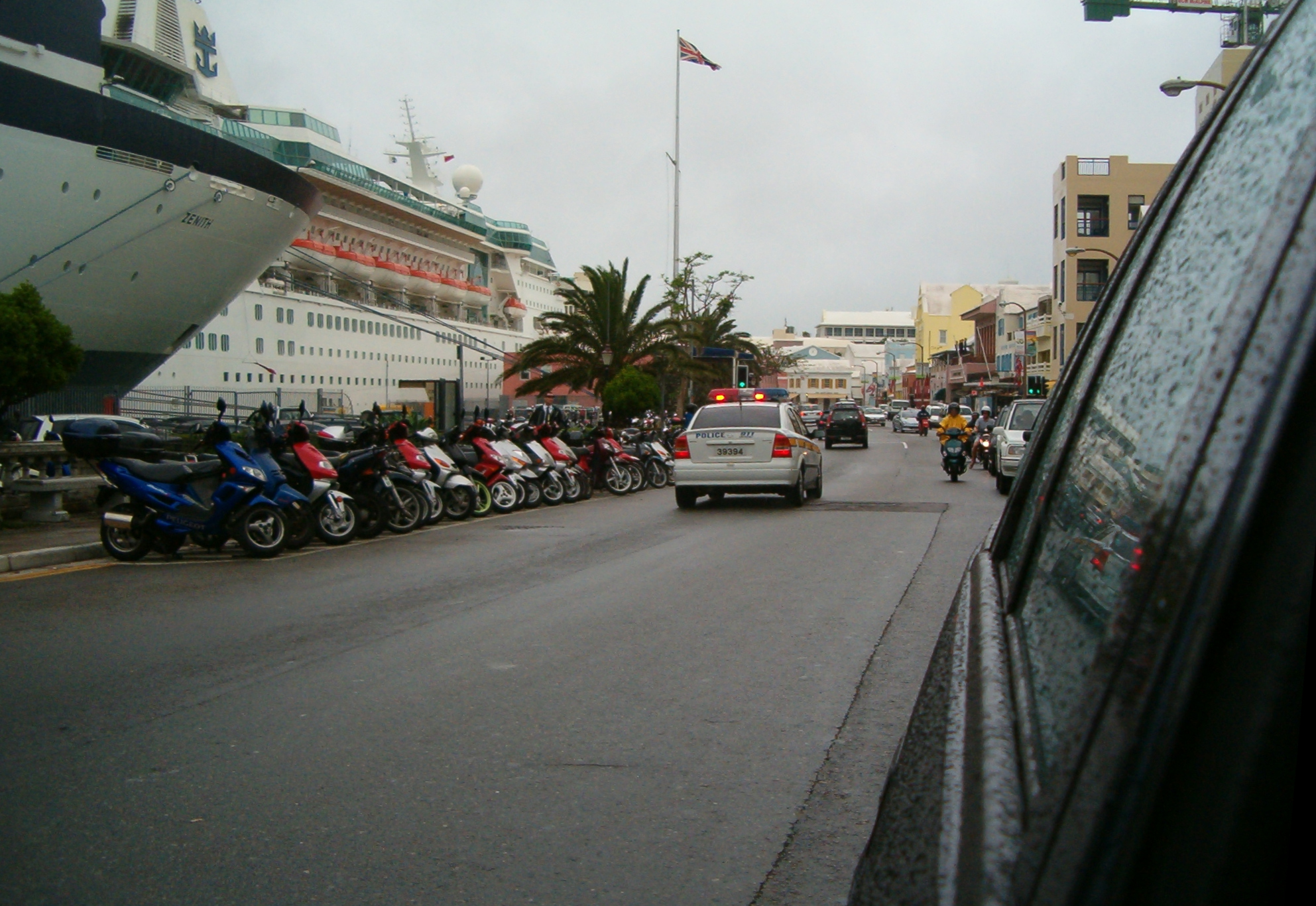
A BPS police car drives westward on Front Street, in the City of Hamilton, Bermuda on the 6 June 2006, responding to an incident

In 1995 the Bermuda Police Force was renamed the "Bermuda Police Service" as it was thought that the word "force" had unsavoury connotations. The Reserve Constabulary was renamed the "Bermuda Reserve Police" and adopted the same uniform as the full-time police officers. This was meant to address the common misconception they had suffered from, which was that they were not "real" police officers. Also in 1995, the United States Navy withdrew from Bermuda, leaving the Bermuda Government responsible for policing the whole of what was now Bermuda International Airport.

Bermuda was still feeling the effects of the recession of the early 1990s, and this had led to a reduction in the number of officers of the Bermuda Police Service. At the same time, the new Police Commissioner, Colin Coxall, was determined to modernise the Bermuda Police Service by returning it to its roots. It was felt that the service had lost familiarity with the community it was policing, with constables waiting in police stations to react to situations, rather than walking the beat, anticipating, and preventing them.

As the Bermuda Police Service attempted to redirect its efforts to more traditional "community policing", which required more officers, it found itself short of personnel. Many non-policing roles within the service were reassigned to civilians in order to place more police officers on the street, but it was ultimately decided to withdraw most of the detachment from the airport in order to make-up the shortfall elsewhere.

== Airport police ==
After the 1995 closure of the US Navy's Naval Air Station Bermuda (NAS Bermuda), policing of the airport, which had previously been split between the US Navy and the Bermuda Police, was divided between the new Airport Security Police (a privatised police force operating under the Department of Airport Operations - part of the Ministry of Transport), on the airside, and the Bermuda Police Service, which maintained a small detachment at its Airport Police Station, supplied from the complement of the St. George's Police Station, on the landside.

That part of the former US NAS Bermuda which was not required for the operation of the airfield was fenced off and patrolled, until final decisions on the disposal of the land were made, by the Baselands Security.

This was a unit of security guards recruited, trained, and operated by the Bermuda Police Service, which wore Bermuda Police uniforms, drove Bermuda Police cars, but whose personnel were civilians, without police powers.

== Current operations ==
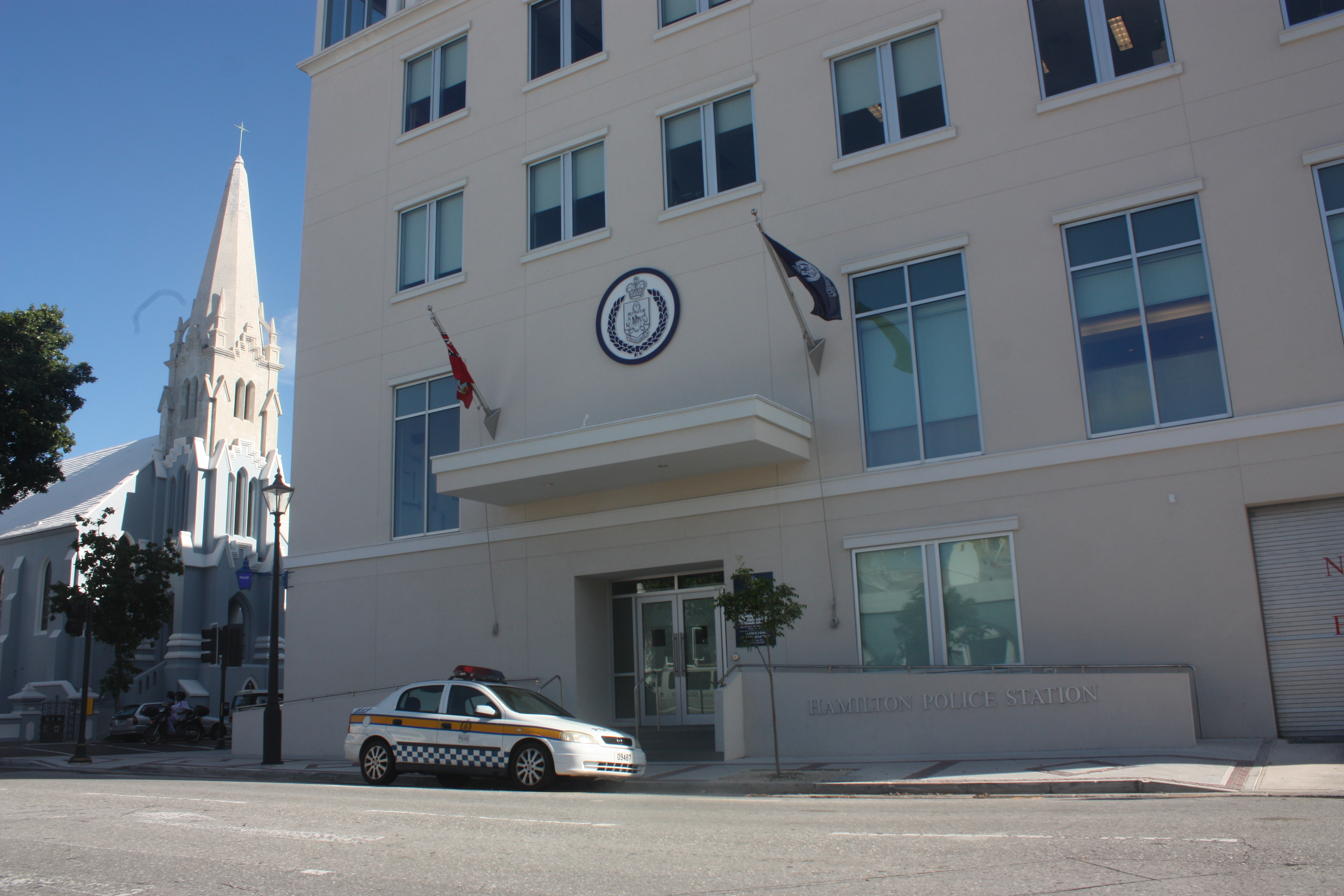
The new Hamilton Police Station in 2011

As of 2009, the strength of the service is 468 officers, operating from four police stations in Hamilton, St. George's, Southside (the former US Naval Air Station) and Somerset, along with the headquarters at Prospect Camp, and a small Marine Police Station on Barr's Bay, in Hamilton (which had been shared with the US Navy's Shore Patrol up until 1995. This has now been moved to the Royal Naval Dockyard). Following the closure of the US Naval Air Station in Bermuda, the Scenes Of Crimes officers have moved to a building there. Plans to create a single, new building to house both the Hamilton Police Station and the Magistrates Court on the corner of Court Street and Victoria Street have recently been carried through, with the Hamilton Police Station having relocated there. Sub police stations on Ord Road, in Warwick, and on St. David's Island have been discussed, though not opened. As with the Airport Police Station, these stations would be staffed only for parts of the day by detachments from one of the permanent stations. Such a sub station was actually created on Middle Road, in Warwick, a few years ago, but has since been closed.

Following a spate of shootings in May, 2009, believed to be gang-related, there were calls for increasing the size and deployment of police forces. Premier Ewart Brown called for "sustained, regular policing" and increased foot patrols "in recognised trouble spots". Police Commissioner Jackson said on 29 May that the Service faced "an unprecedented level of criminality" from a hardcore group of 50–100 violent individuals in four or five gangs. In response, the force will intensify patrolling of trouble-prone areas, by doubling the number of Armed Response Vehicles and deploying officers on an around-the-clock basis in those areas.

The Royal Bermuda Regiment Coast Guard takes control of any Maritime Law Enforcement and Search & Rescue duties.

Most of the boats used by the Bermuda Police are too small to be used far from shore. As Bermuda is now responsible for policing a zone within a 200-mile radius of Bermuda, larger, seagoing vessels are required. The first large boat operated by the unit, the Heron, lacked the speed required to quickly respond to incidents beyond the reefline. The unit had subsequently also utilised sport fishing boats, including the Heron II, but took delivery in 2006 of a purpose-built patrol vessel, the Guardian, built by Australian shipyard Austal.

== Rank Structure ==
The rank structure of the Bermuda Police Service is similar to British police forces and starts with the most junior rank of Constable and goes up to Commissioner.

The Commissioner has frequently been brought in as an experienced police officer from a police force in the British Isles or Canada (Jean-Jacques Lemay of the Royal Canadian Mounted Police),

although some have been promoted from within the force, including Bermudians Frederick C. B. Bean, and Jonathan Smith. In October 2021, a local Bermudian and career BPS Police Officer was made Acting Commissioner.

Bermuda Police Service Ranks and Insignia
Rank	Commissioner	Deputy Commissioner	Assistant Commissioner	Superintendent	Chief inspector	Inspector	Sergeant	Constable
Epaulette insignia								

== Reserve police ==
The BPS has a reserve force, created as the Bermuda Reserve Constabulary in 1951, which was renamed as the Bermuda Reserve Police in 1999 (the change also included issuing the reservists the same dark blue uniform as the regular constabulary as some members of the public had imagined the previously grey-uniformed reservists to not be "real police").

Prior to 1951, the Parish Constables had originally been retained to supplement the new regular Police Constables (today, Parish Constable is an appointment held by a regular Police Constable). Extra Constables (at least some of whom were retired Police Constables) were appointed when required to support the Police Constables and Rural Police Constables, including during the First World War. The Bermuda Special Constabulary had been created during the Second World War, but had been disestablished in 1950.

The Reserve is made up of men and women between the ages of 18 and 60, who have full powers, including the power of arrest.

They are unpaid officers, similar to the United Kingdom's Special Constabulary. However, they do receive a tax-free sum every six months.

=== Rank structure ===
The Reserve Police have their own distinct rank structure, which is one of the ways of distinguishing the more senior Reserve ranks from Regular ranks. The rank structure was altered in 2015.

The insignia is similar to some UK Special Constabulary rank structures, in that it does not use the 'pips and crowns' system, but rather bars and laurel wreaths. Reserve Constables wear no insignia, just their collar number, like their regular counterparts.

Bermuda Reserve Police Rank Structure
Rank	Commandant	Deputy Commandant	Assistant Commandant	Chief Officer	Section Officer	Reserve Constable
Epaulette insignia				SCI		

== Equipment ==
The current equipment of Bermuda Police consists of ASP telescopic batons for regular duty and Arnold 26-inch batons for crowd and riot control, as well as PAVA spray, Tasers, ARWEN 37 launchers, and tear gas and smoke grenades.

Firearms available are as below:

Model	Origin	Type
Glock 17	Austria	Semi-automatic pistol
Heckler & Koch MP5	Germany	Submachine gun
M16 rifle	United States	Assault rifle
M4 carbine	United States	Assault rifle
Remington 870	United States	Shotgun

== Gallery ==
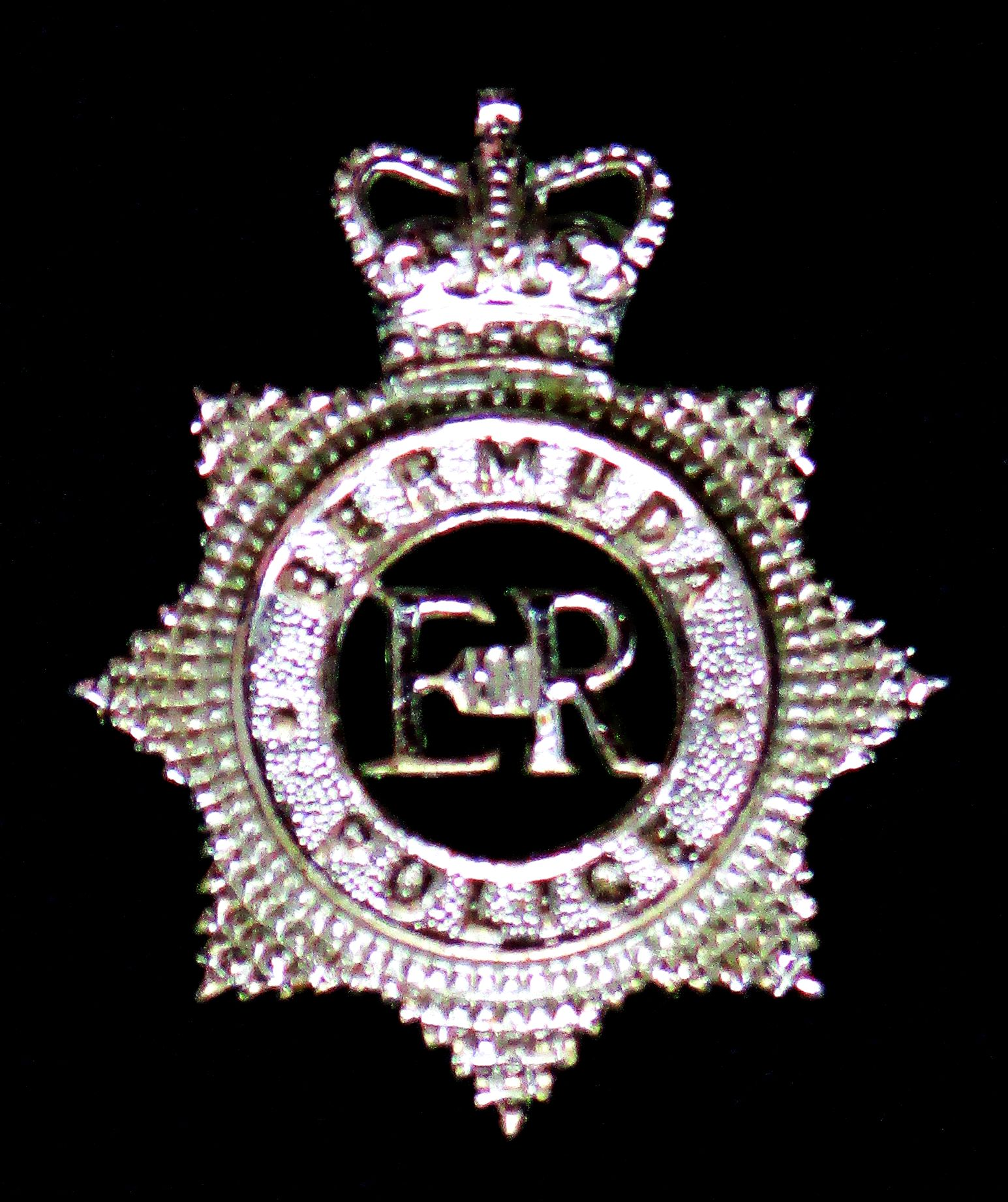
Obsolete pattern Bermuda Police Force cap badge (post 1953)

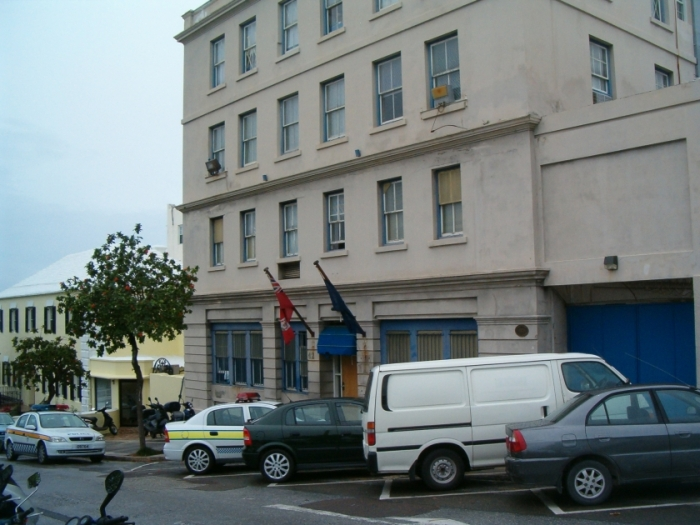
The former Hamilton police station in 2006

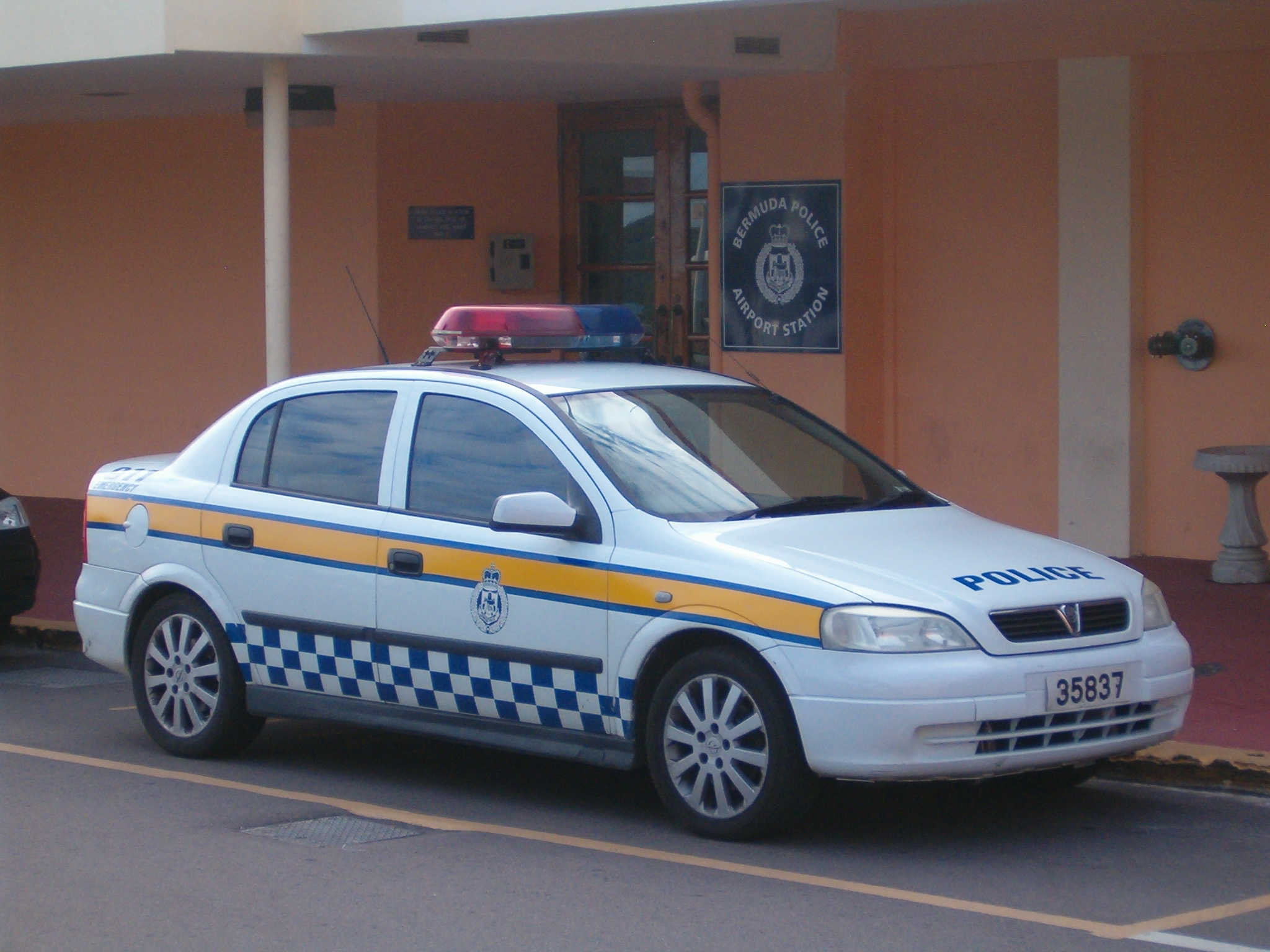
BPS patrol car at the Airport Station

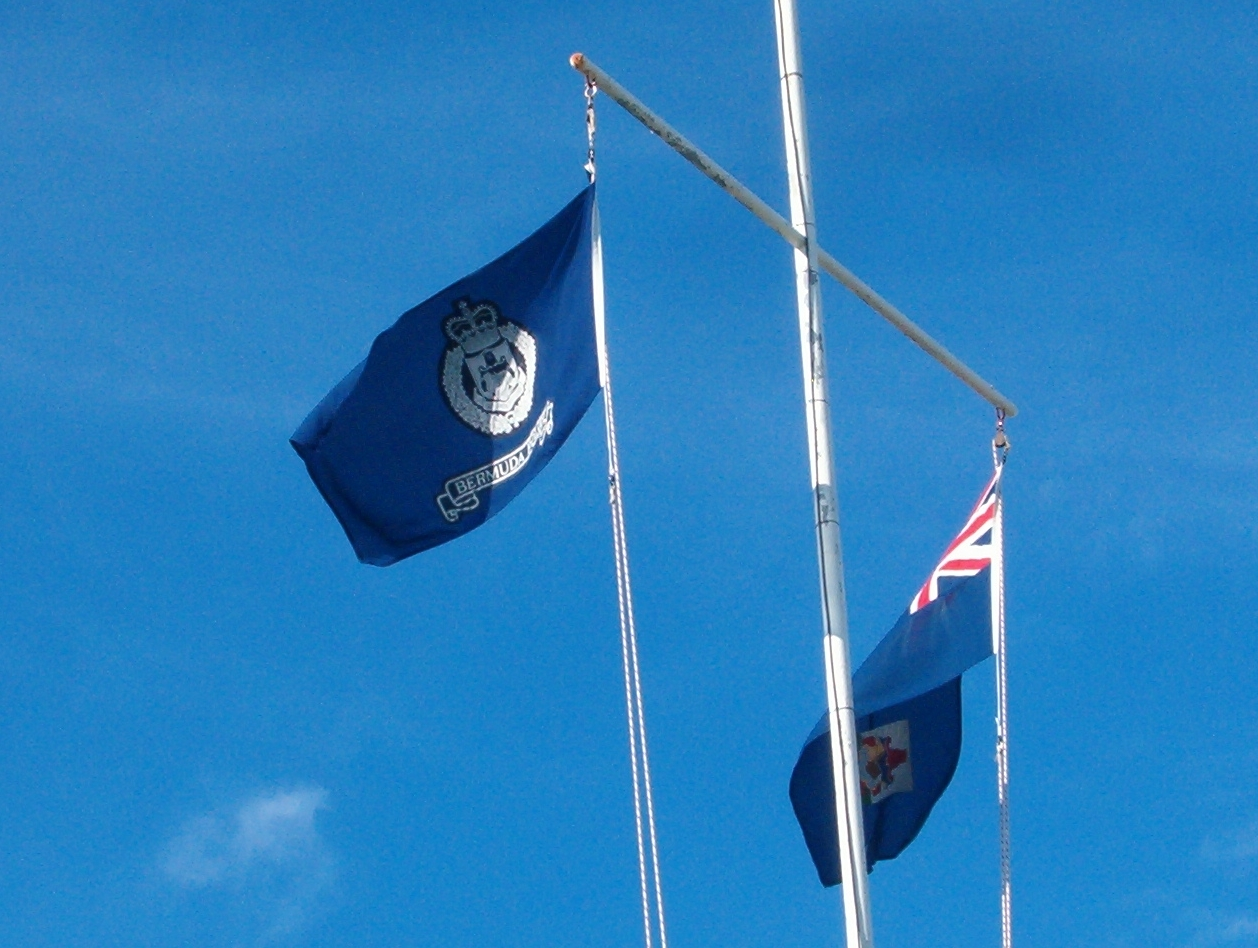
Flags of the marine section at Barr's Bay

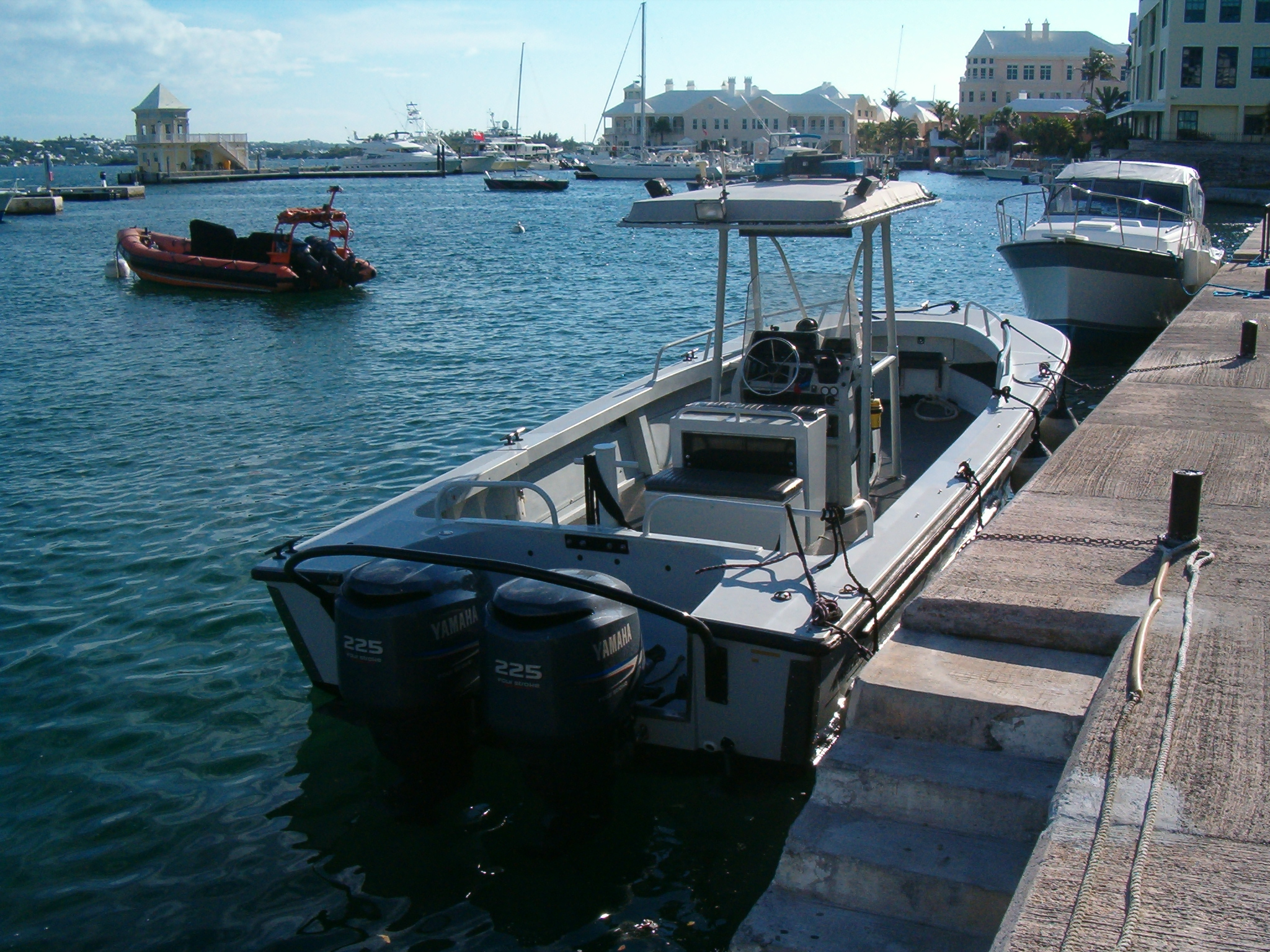
Boats of the marine section at Barr's Bay, in Hamilton

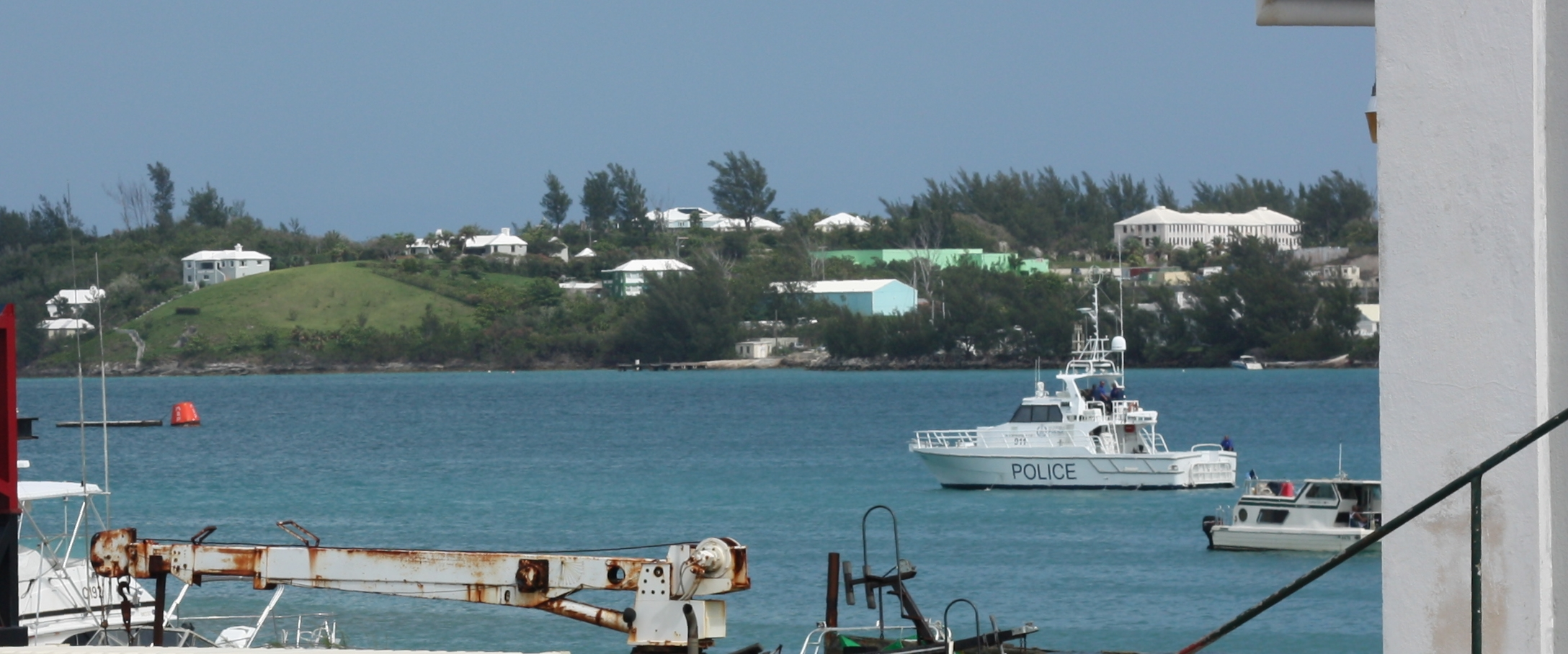
The Guardian patrolling St. George's Harbour, in July 2011

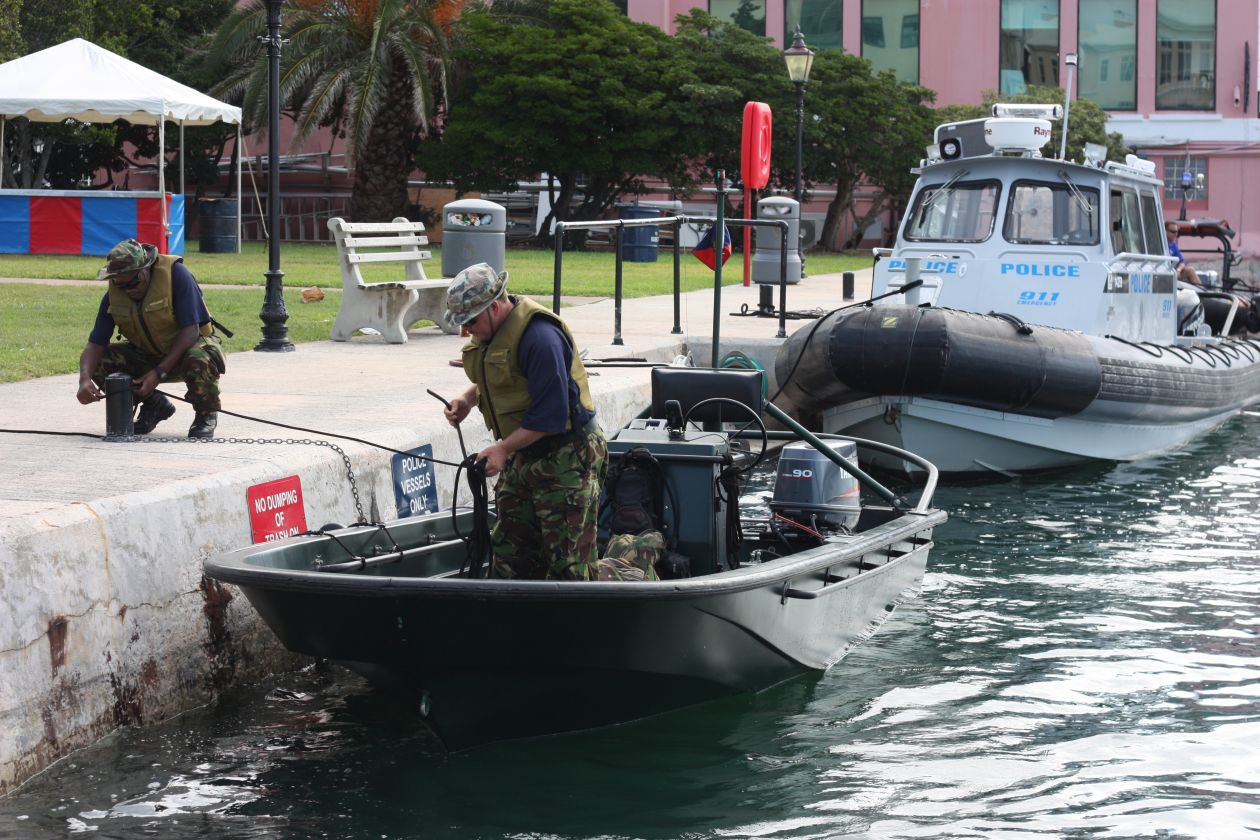
Royal Bermuda Regiment & BPS boats in July 2011

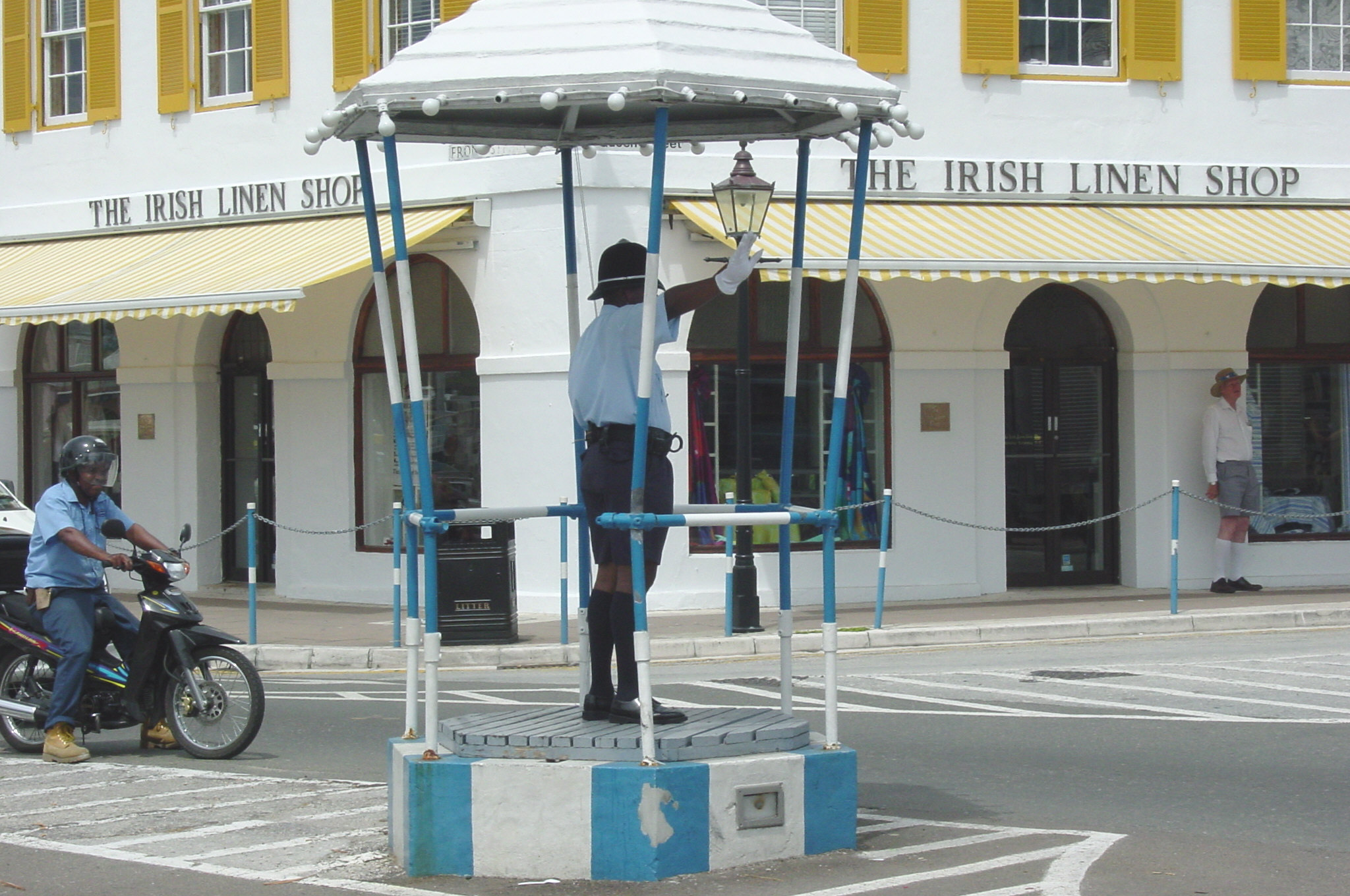
Policeman directing traffic from the Birdcage at Heyl's Corner, on Front Street in Hamilton, 2001

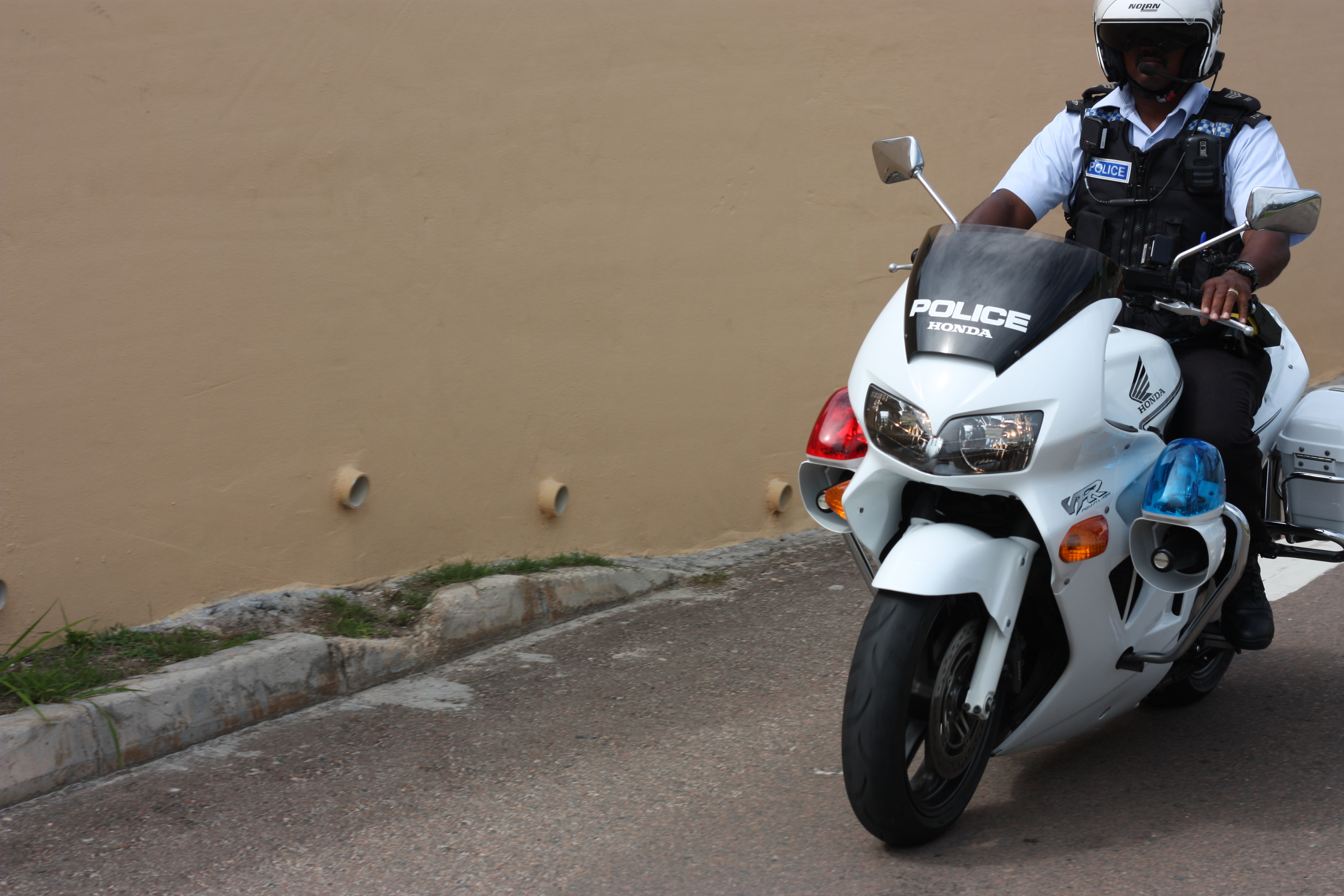
A police sergeant of the cycle squad in July, 2011

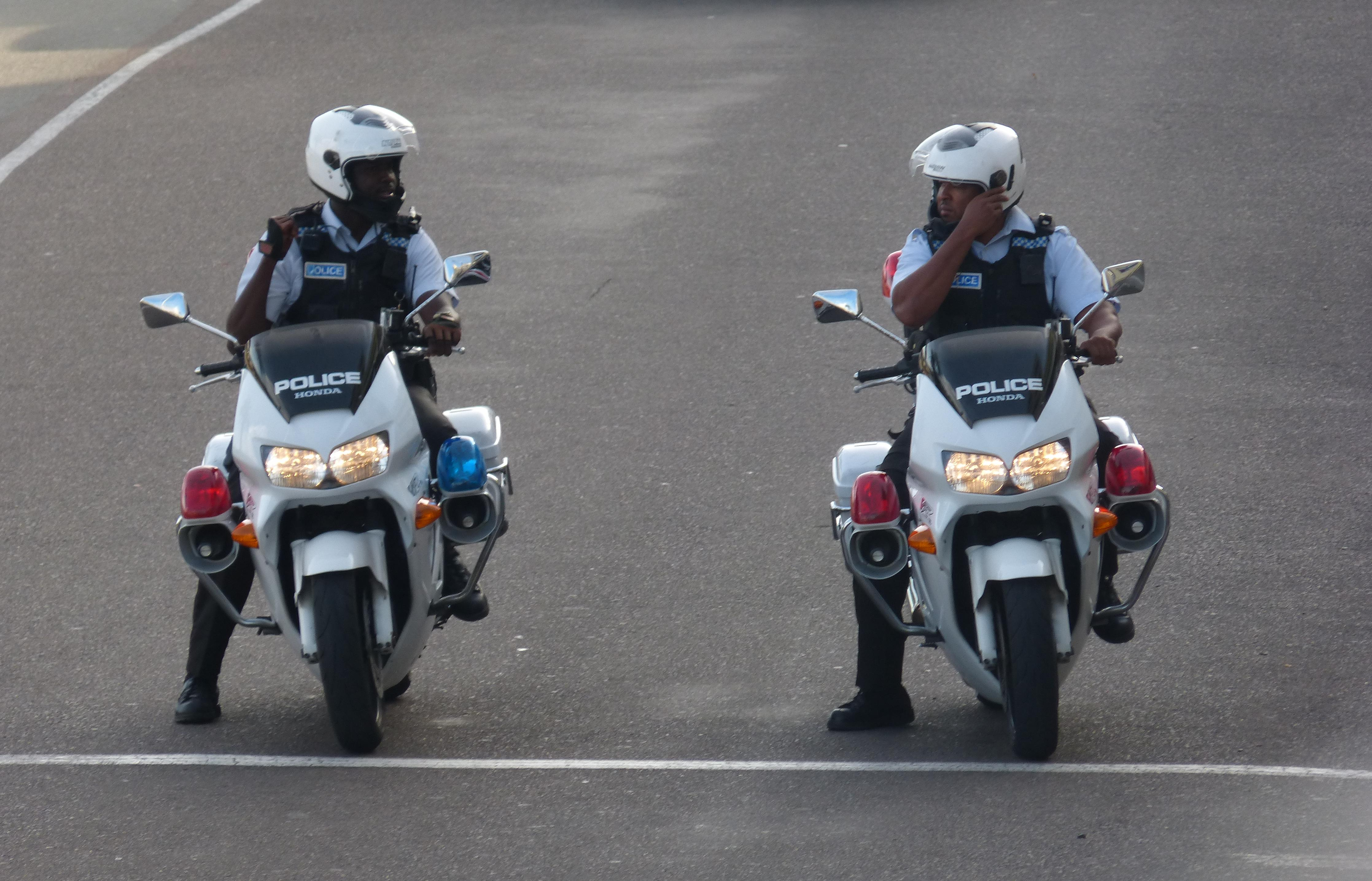
BPS motorcyclists

== Part of ==
- Bermuda
- Military of Bermuda
