= Recreational boat fishing =

Recreational fishing on water vessels

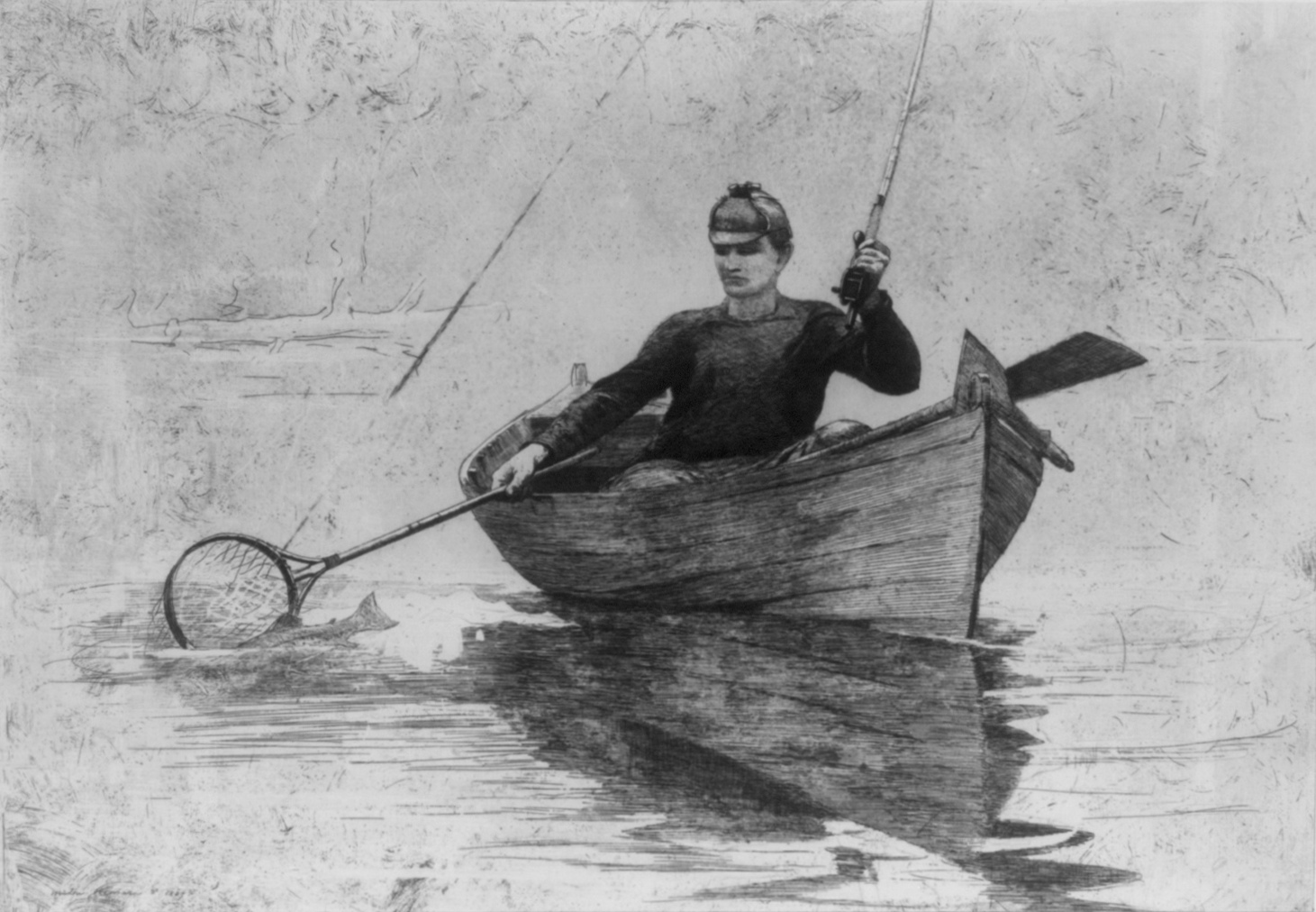
Fly fishing from a dinghy

Recreational boat fishing is recreational fishing using surface watercraft (boats) as the activity platform. Unlike commercial/artisanal boat fishing, where fishing are conducted from professional fishing vessels and more high-yielding fishing techniques such as nets, fish traps, longlining/trotlining and trolling are used, angling with rods is by far the most common recreational boat fishing technique, followed by bowfishing and spearfishing. Compared to the land-based bank fishing and surf fishing, where the fishing activities conducted by casting from a river bank or a shoreline, boating allows access to deeper fishing grounds farther from the shore and thus more diverse species of game fish.

== Inshore ==
Inshore boat fishing is fishing from a boat in easy sight of land and in water less than about 30 metres deep. The boat can be either sailboats, human-powered watercraft such as a dinghy, row boat, kayak or canoe, or light motorboats such as a runabout, inflatable, fanboat or small cabin cruiser. Inshore boats are typically small enough to be carried atop of a vehicle roof rack or be towed on a boat trailer, and are much more affordable than offshore fishing boats. They are typically deployed in inland waterbodies such as rivers, lakes/reservoirs and lagoons, as well as estuaries and shallow seas inside bays. In recent times, kayak fishing has become popular form of inshore boat fishing, especially on relatively calm bodies of water ("flatwater").

Anglers either use an uptide sea rod between 9 and 10 feet in length to cast from the boat or a shorter downtide rod between 6 and 8 feet. Lines are usually between 18 pounds and 50 pounds breaking strain dependent on the species of fish being targeted. Reels are usually multipliers, although fixed spool reels are being used more and more. Baits are similar to those used for beach and rock fishing except they are often larger since larger fish are targeted. The species will include all the beach species, but now also include big conger eels and small sharks like tope and smoothhound.

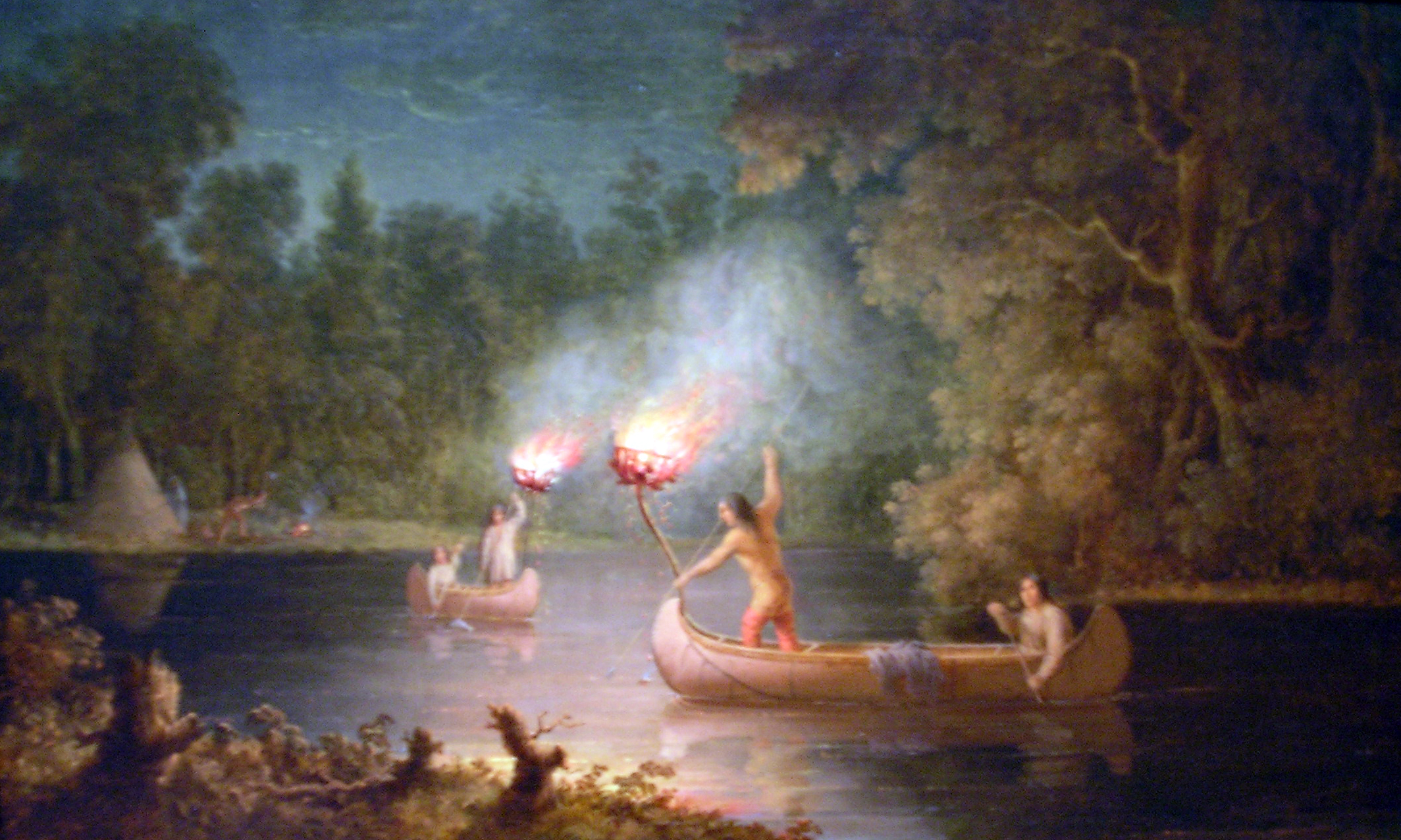
Menominees spearfishing salmon at night by torchlight and canoe on Fox River

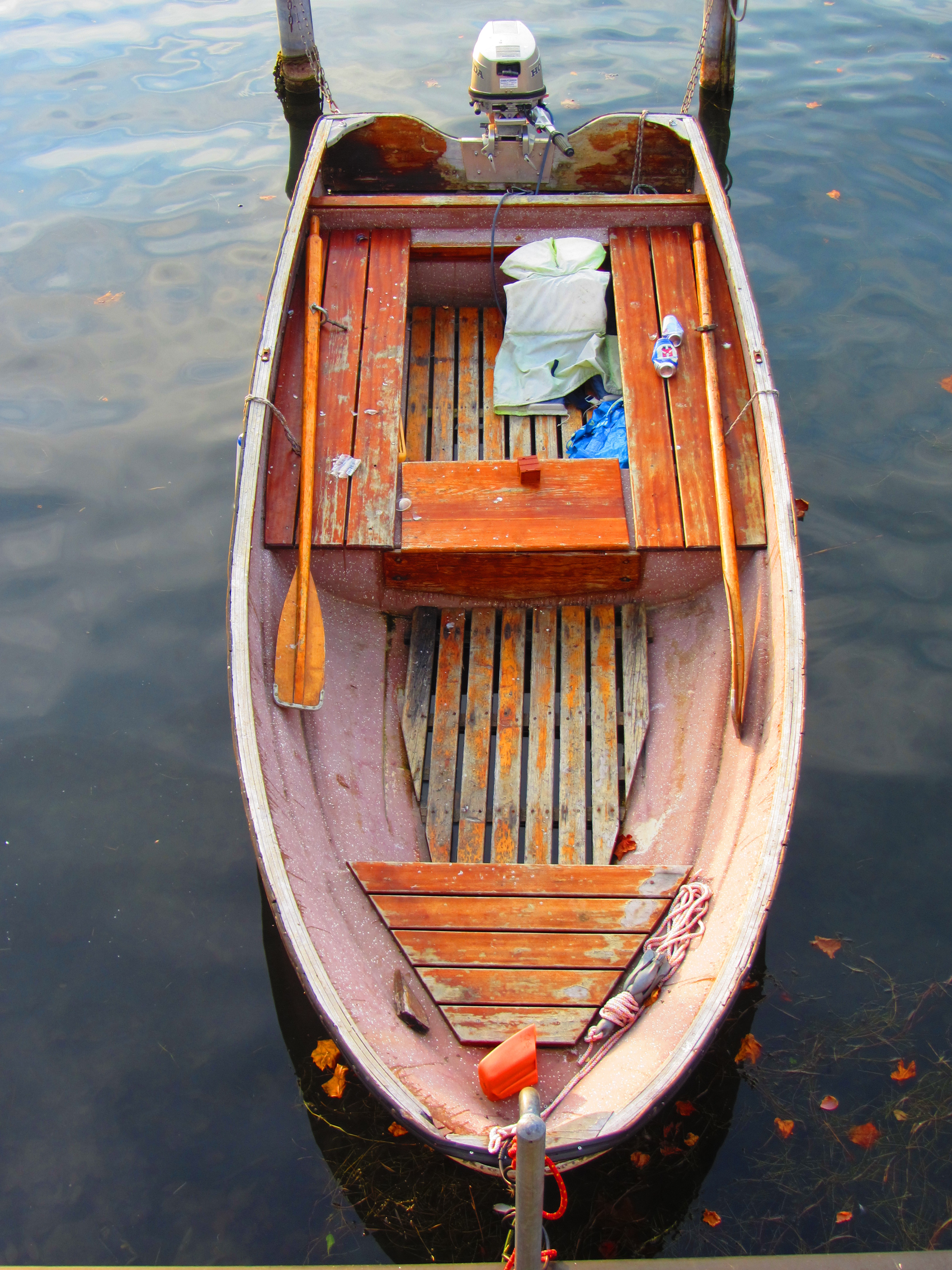
Fishing dingy in Switzerland

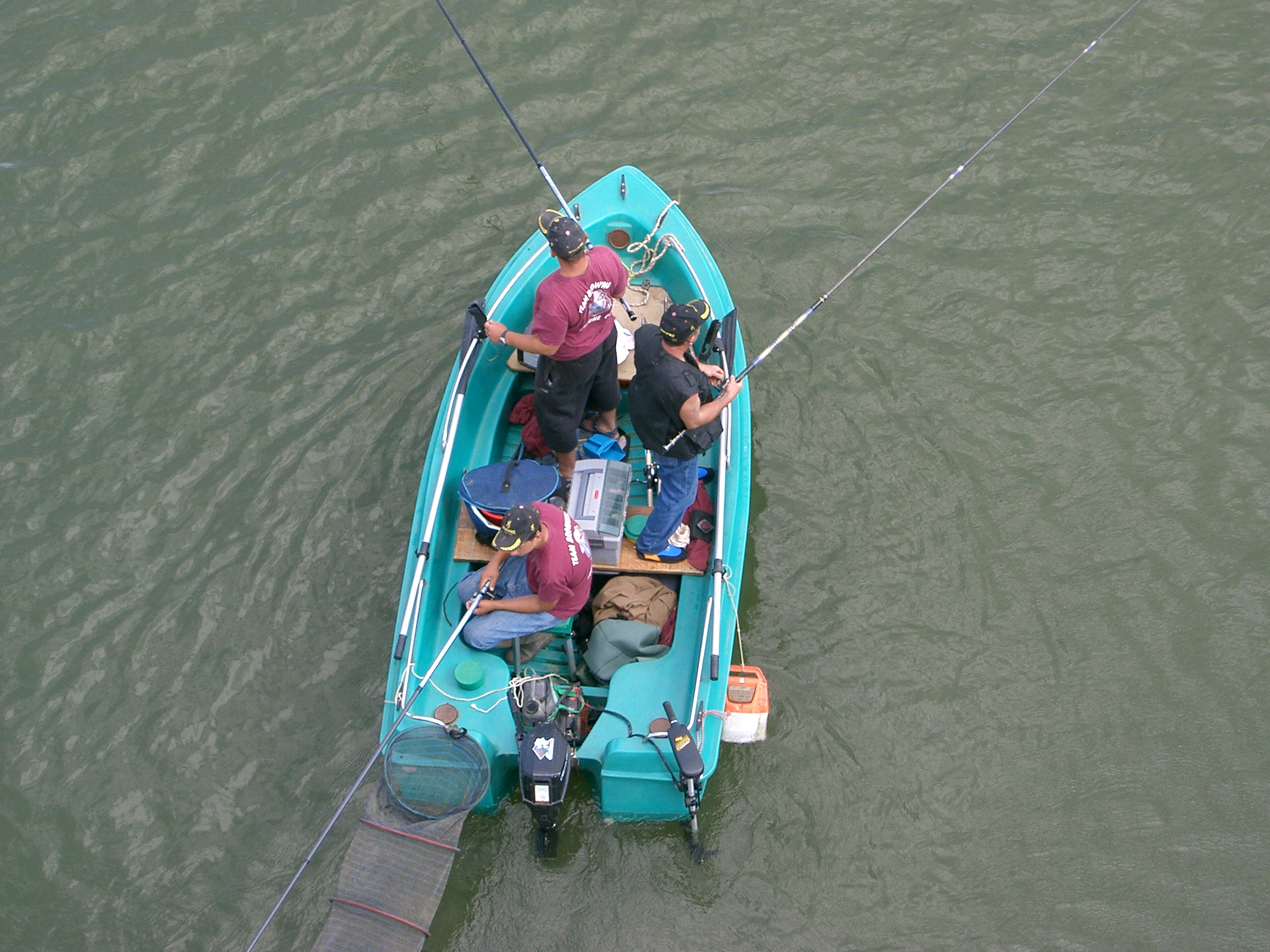
Fishing from a boat on the Doubs, France

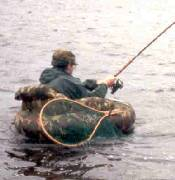
An angler in a float tube plays a pike.

== Offshore ==
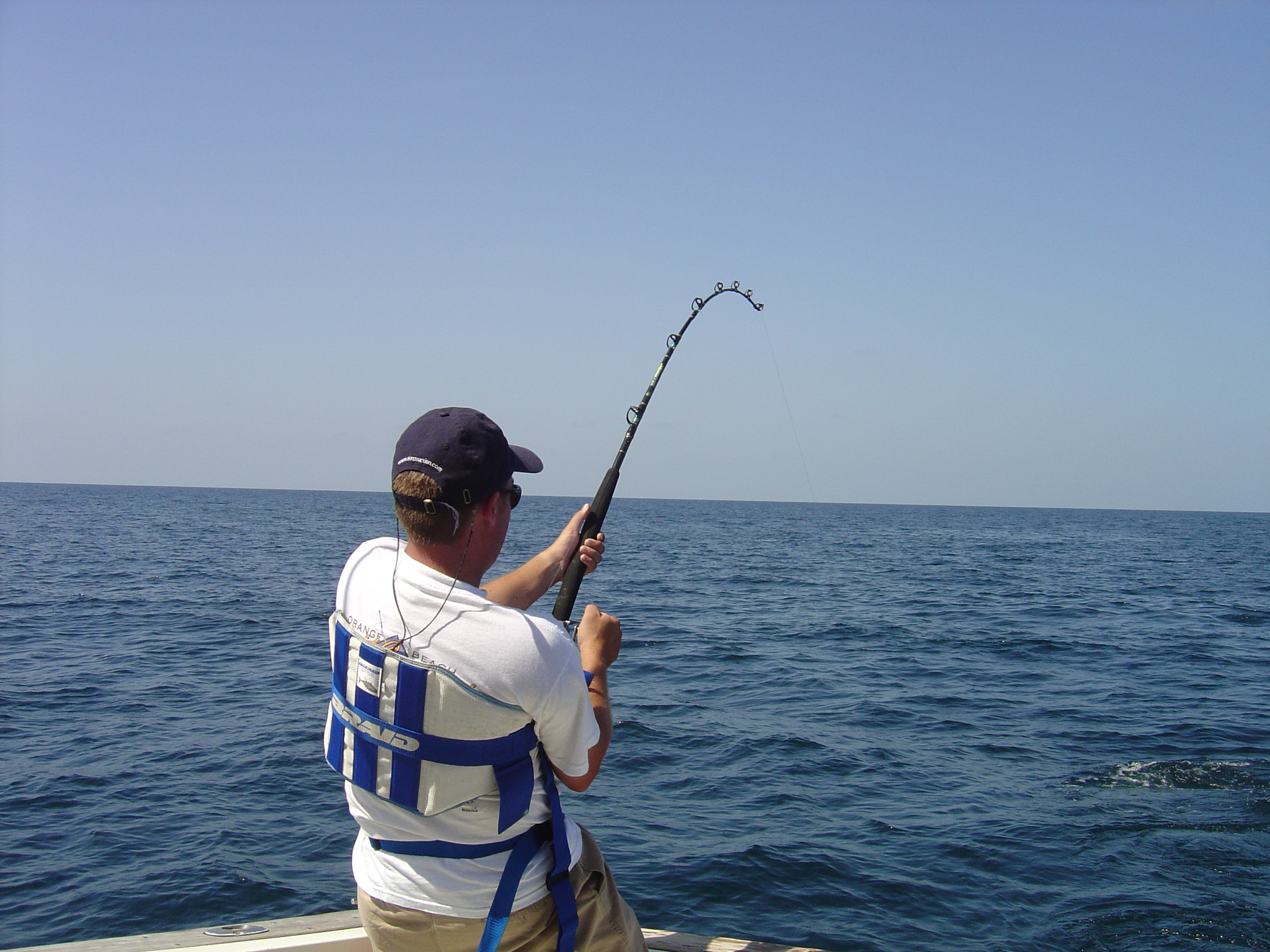
Deep sea fishing from a boat in the Gulf of Mexico

Offshore boat fishing, sometimes called deep sea or open water fishing, is fishing in deep water (more than 30 m or 98 ft) and at some distance away from land. It is more dangerous compared to shallow water fishing or lake fishing, as the boat is subjected to greater currents and waves and thus more vulnerable to maritime accidents. Offshore fishing therefore demands more knowledge and expertise about weather patterns, navigation and safety precautions, and is not an activity for beginners.

Offshore boats are generally much larger than inshore boats, and may need to be moored/docked in a marina. They are more sturdily constructed with more powerful engines, so they can brave the weather and water conditions encountered in open waters. Though they differ in design and purpose and prices vary widely they are generally expensive to build and maintain. Most offshore recreational fishermen charter boats rather than own them. It is often a pastime of the affluent, and there is a demand for charter boats equipped and catered to luxurious excess.

Offshore game fish, like marlin and tuna, can be very large and heavy tackles are needed. Fishing is usually done with sea rods, such as downtide rods, with lines of 30 to 50 pounds and multiplier reels. Baits are the same as for inshore fishing and include squid and whole mackerel as well as artificial lures such as perks. Fishing takes place over reefs and wrecks for very large cod, ling and congers.

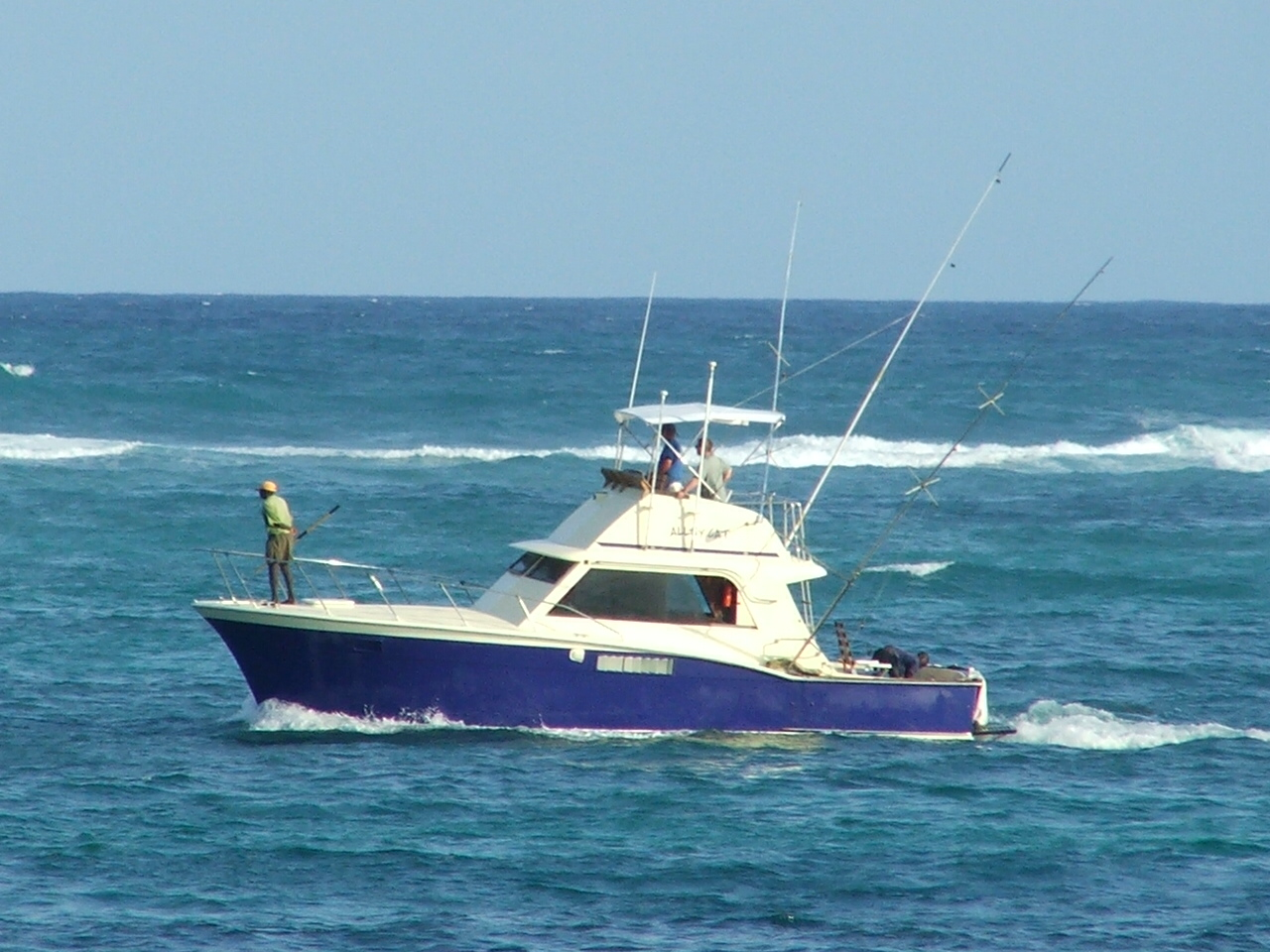
Small sport fishing boat

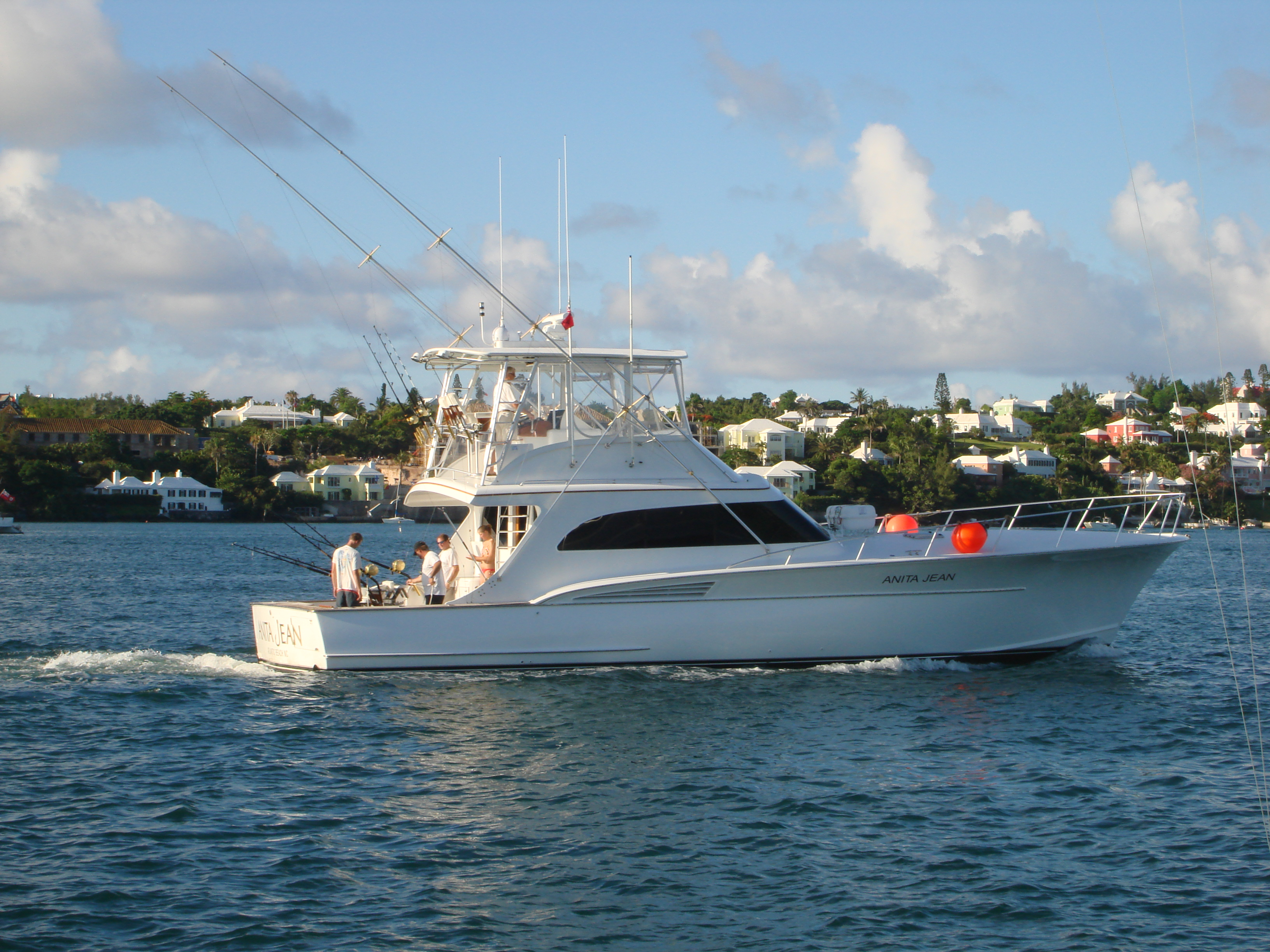
Larger charter boat in Bermuda

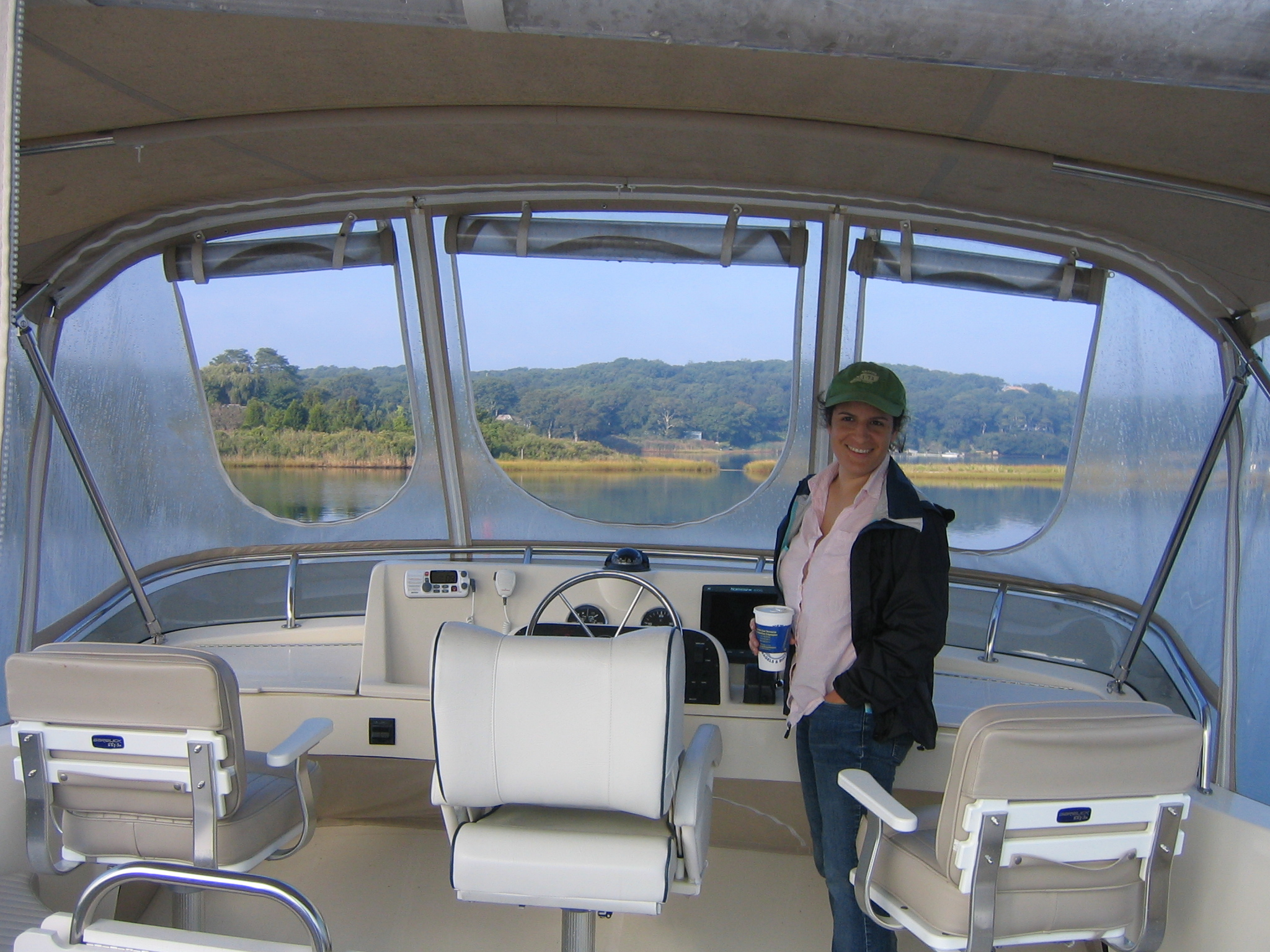
On the bridge of a sport fishing boat in Long Island Sound

== See also ==
- Fishing vessel
- Traditional fishing boats
