= Livewell =

Container for live bait on boats

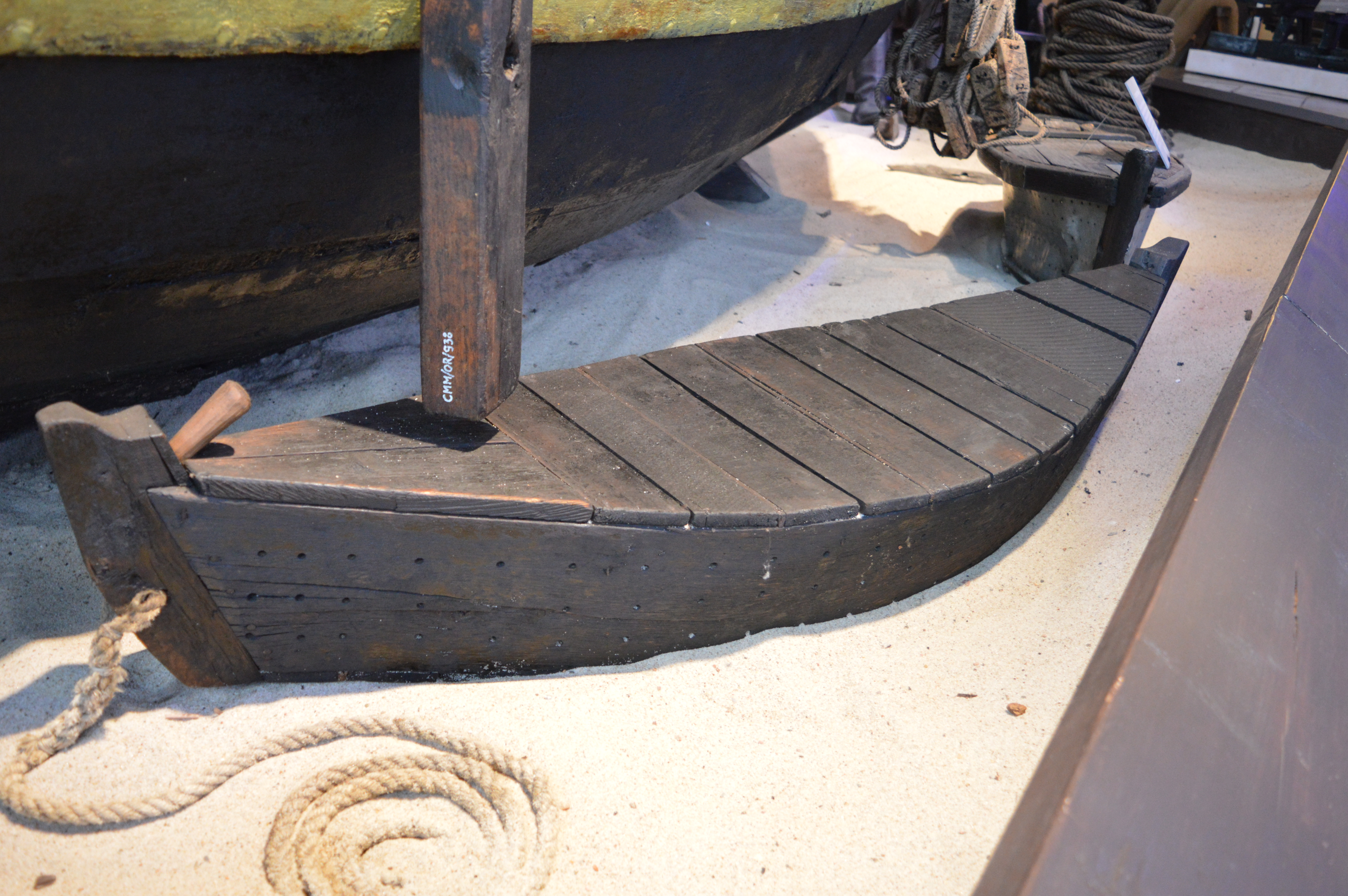
A wooden livewell (container for live bait), towed by fishing boat. Exposition in Fisheries Museum in Hel (branch of National Maritime Museum in Gdańsk)

A livewell is a water tank found on many fishing boats that is used to keep live bait and caught fish alive. It works by pumping natural water from the surrounding waterbody into the tank, as well as an air pump for water aeration. It is a standard design feature in many modern sport fishing boats and yachts, especially those used in fishing tournaments, as competitions typically weigh participants' catch only at the end of the round and thus require the caught fish to be kept in the condition they were caught until the boat returns to dock.

A rule of thumb for determining the necessitated size of a livewell is that every inch length of fish needs a gallon (3.8 liter) of water if it is desired to keep the fish alive for a prolonged period of time. Besides size and water circulation, two other key factors of the functionality of a livewell are maintaining proper temperature and removing metabolic waste. Water temperatures should be below 75 °F (24 °C); ice can be used as a coolant.

== Oxygen levels ==
It is very important to maintain adequate oxygen levels in the livewell. It should be above 5 parts per million. Electric aeration systems are often used to do this. These often work by creating a spray that increases the surface area of the water, or by passing it through a Venturi.

A livewell is a box used to transport live aquatic animals; shrimp, baitfish and mature fish, saltwater or freshwater species. A livewell should be made of materials that are non- toxic to aquatic animals. The shape may be square, rectangular, oval or round. The box may be insulated, portable, and have a drain and lid. Maintaining minimal safe water quality standards in livewell water is essential to ensure a safe habitat for all the captive animals during transport. When transporting baitfish, shrimp or mature fish, maintaining dissolved oxygen saturation (DO Sat) is the single most important water quality parameter that must be controlled. Livewell oxygen–injection systems and LOX systems insure O2 enriched livewell water. Pure 100% compressed welding oxygen is injected into the water with a precision dose adjustable high-pressure oxygen regulator, oxygen tube and diffuser. Commercial and sport fishing oxygen-injection systems are designed to insure 100% DO Saturation or greater whether the bait or fish load is 1 lb or >1000 lbs. The minimal safe EPA water quality standard for steady state environments (rivers, lakes, ponds, etc.) is 5 ppm DO.

Dissolved oxygen is the single most important factor for keeping bass alive, and an understanding of factors that affect oxygen levels will better enable anglers to keep their fish alive. At a moderate water temperature of 70˚F, 100 percent oxygen saturation is 8.8 mg/L of oxygen, whereas at the higher temperature of 80˚F, 100 percent saturation is 7.9 mg/L. Both of these 100 percent saturation oxygen levels are suitable for keeping bass alive. Without injecting oxygen into the livewell, it is very difficult to supply enough oxygen to keep alive heavier tournament limits. Oxygen injection has long been used by Texas Parks and Wildlife Department (TPWD) hatcheries to maintain the health of fish being stocked into reservoirs. Fisheries staff regularly transport or hold fish in ratios equal to or greater than one pound of fish to a gallon of water. However, boat manufactures do not offer oxygen injection system options. Proper installation and operation of an oxygen injection system will ensure oxygen levels remain above the preferred level of 7 mg/L even when livewells contain heavy limits.

== See also ==
- Keepnet
- Fish stringer
