= Bridge (nautical) =

Room or platform from which a ship can be commanded

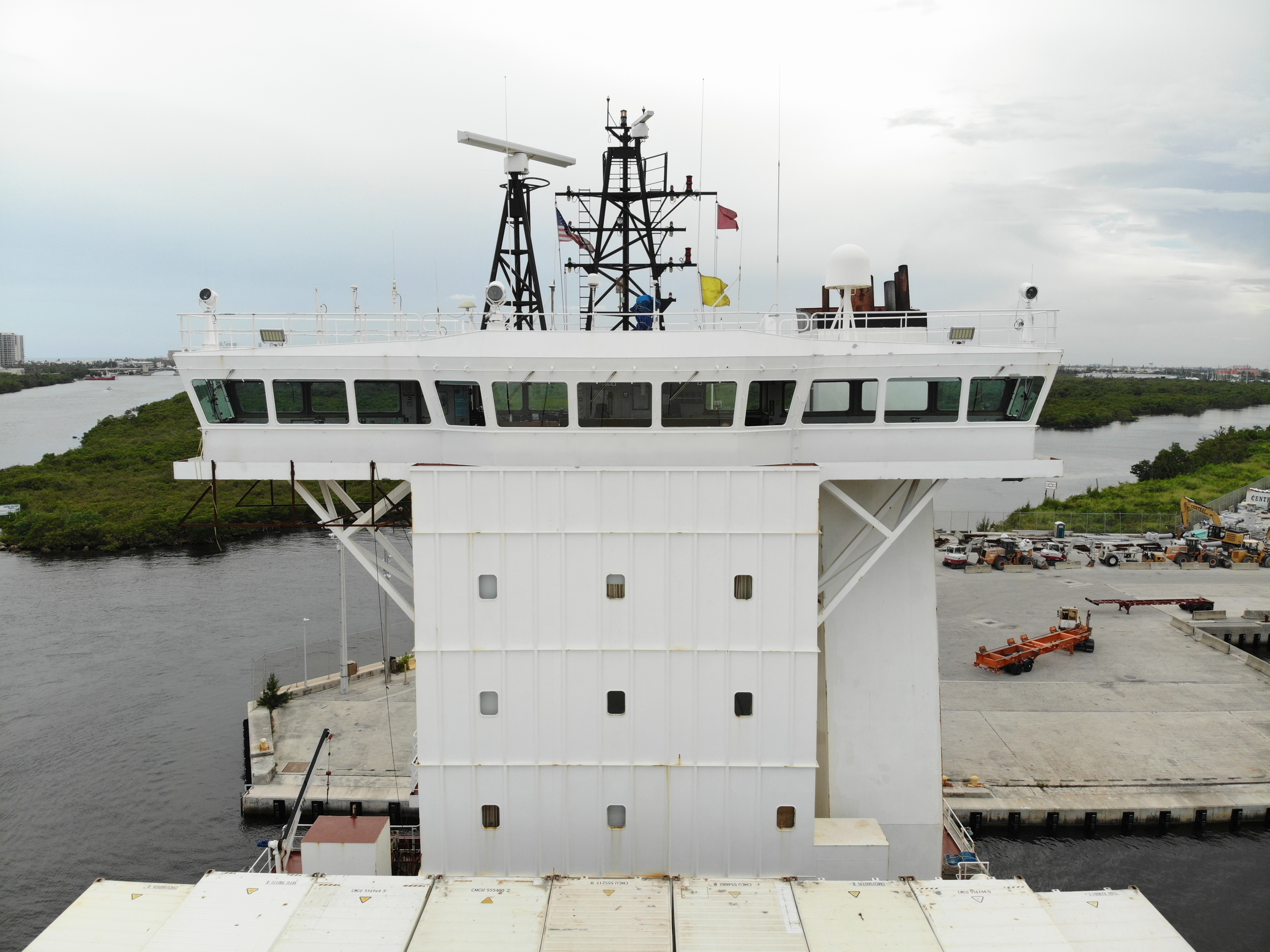
Navigational bridge of a cargo ship docked at Port Everglades, Florida

A bridge (also known as a command deck), or wheelhouse (also known as a pilothouse), is a room or platform of a ship, submarine, airship, or spaceship from which the ship can be commanded. When a ship is under way, the bridge is manned by an officer of the watch aided usually by an able seaman acting as a lookout. During critical maneuvers the captain will be on the bridge, often supported by an officer of the watch, an able seaman on the wheel and sometimes a pilot, if required.

== History ==
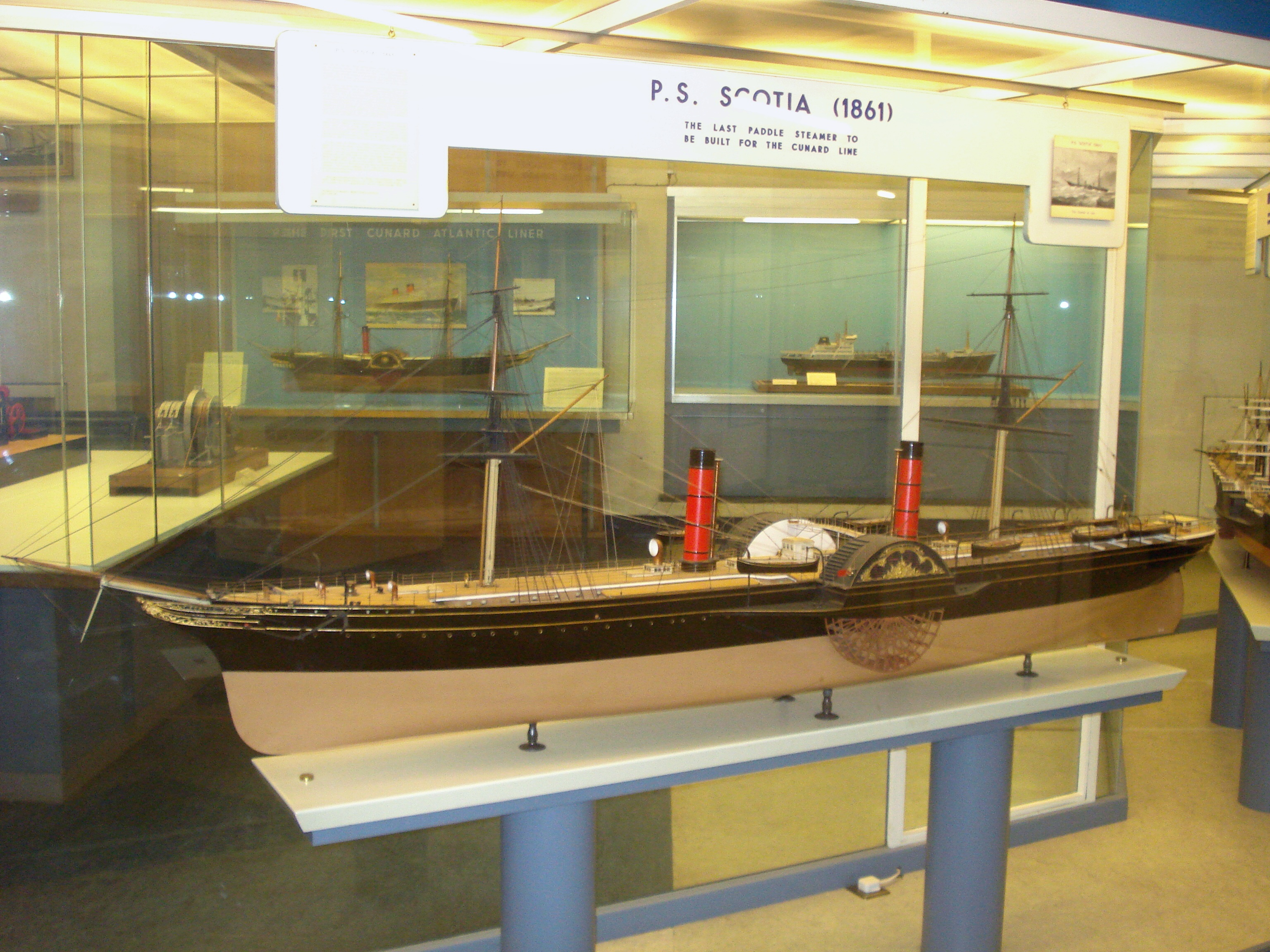
Model of the Cunard Line's Scotia, with a walkway bridge that spans the paddle houses

There are many terms for parts of a ship with functions similar to a bridge. Depending upon the design and layout of a ship, some of these terms may be interchangeable. Traditionally, sailing ships were commanded from the quarterdeck, aft of the mainmast, where the ship's wheel was located (as it was close to the rudder). A "wheelhouse" was a small enclosure around the ship's wheel on the quarterdeck of sailing ships. On modern ships the "wheelhouse" or "pilothouse" refers to the bridge of smaller motor vessels, such as tugs. With the arrival of paddle steamers, engineers required a platform from which they could inspect the paddle wheels and where the captain's view would not be obstructed by the paddle houses. A raised walkway, literally a bridge, connecting the paddle houses was therefore provided. When the screw propeller superseded the paddle wheel, the term "bridge" survived.

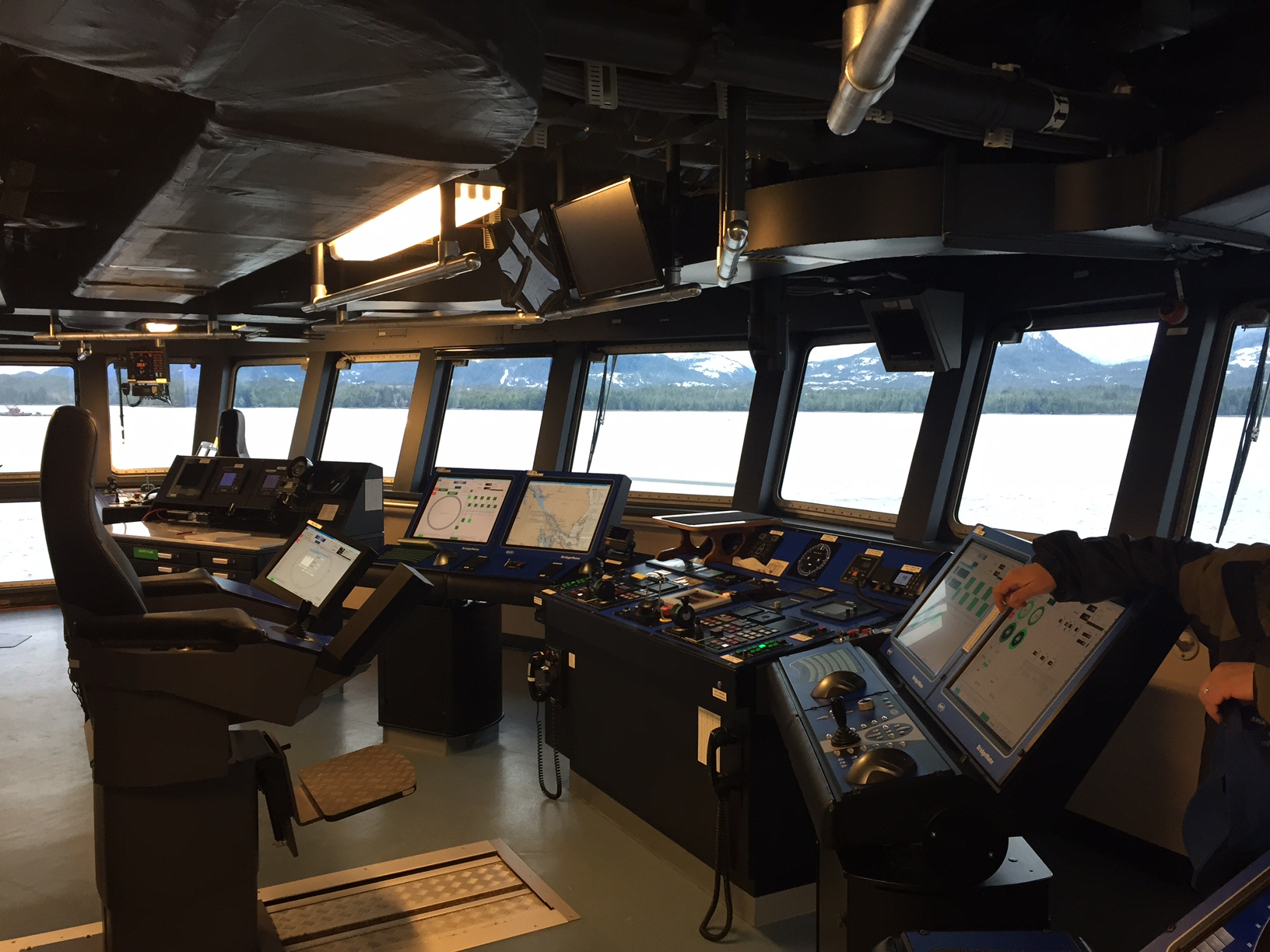
The interior of the bridge of the research vessel Sikuliaq, docked at Ketchikan, Alaska

Traditionally, commands would be passed from the senior officer on the bridge to stations dispersed throughout the ship, where physical control of the ship was exercised, as technology did not exist for the remote control of steering or machinery. Helm orders would be passed to an enclosed wheel house, where the coxswain or helmsman operated the ship's wheel. Engine commands would be relayed to the engine officer in the engine room by an engine order telegraph that displayed the captain's orders on a dial. The engine officer would ensure that the correct combination of steam pressure and engine revolutions were applied. Weatherproof pilot houses supplanted open bridges so that the pilot, who was traditionally the ship's navigating officer, could issue commands from shelter.

Iron, and later steel, ships also required a "compass platform". This was usually a tower, where a magnetic compass could be sited far away as possible from the ferrous interference of the hulk of the ship.

Many ships still have a "flying bridge", a platform atop the pilot house, open to weather, containing a binnacle and voice tubes to allow the conning officer to direct the ship from a higher position during fair weather conditions.

Larger warships may have a "navigation bridge", which is used for the actual conning of the ship, and a separate "admiral's bridge" can be provided in flagships, where the admiral can exercise control over the squadron of ships without interfering with the captain's command of the vessel. In older warships, a heavily armored conning tower was often provided, where the vital command staff could be located under protection to ensure that the ship could be commanded under fire.

On a submarine, the bridge is the highest point on the conning tower, to provide for better visual navigation when on the surface. They became standard on United States Navy submarines after 1917, greatly improving the function of the vessels while at the surface.

== Configuration ==
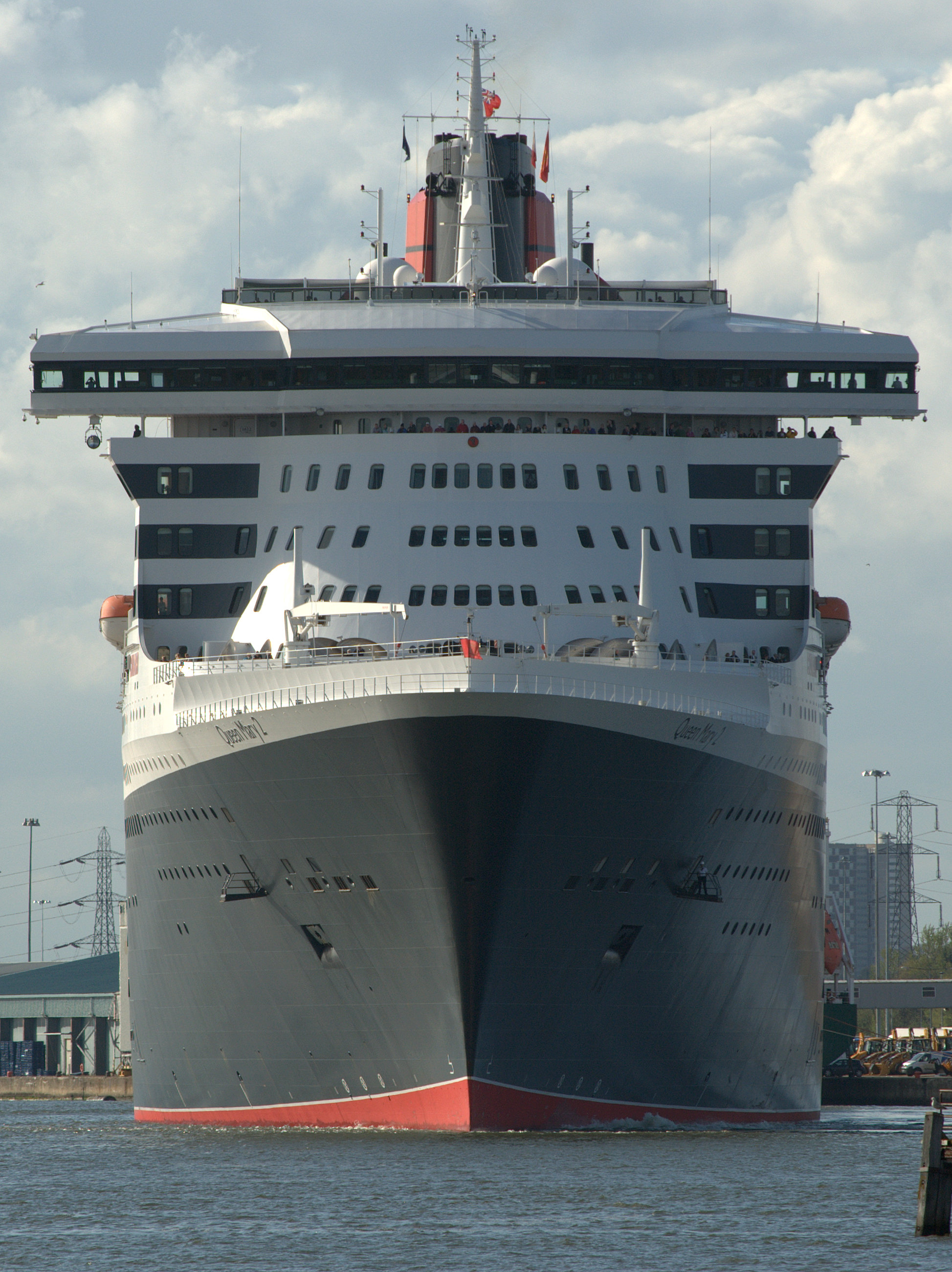
RMS Queen Mary 2, showing a bridge with enclosed bridge wings that permit a view along both sides of the vessel

Modern advances in remote control equipment have seen progressive transfer of the actual control of the ship to the bridge. The wheel and throttles can be operated directly from the bridge, controlling often-unmanned machinery spaces. Aboard modern warships, navigational command comes from the bridge, whereas electronically directed weapon systems are usually controlled from an interior compartment.

On a commercial vessel, the bridge will contain the equipment necessary to safely navigate a vessel on passage. Such equipment will vary with ship type, but generally includes a GPS navigation device, a Navtex receiver, an ECDIS or chart system, one or more radars, a communications system (including distress calling equipment), engine (telegraph) controls, a wheel/autopilot system, a magnetic compass (for redundancy and cross check capability) and light/sound signalling devices.

=== Navigation station ===
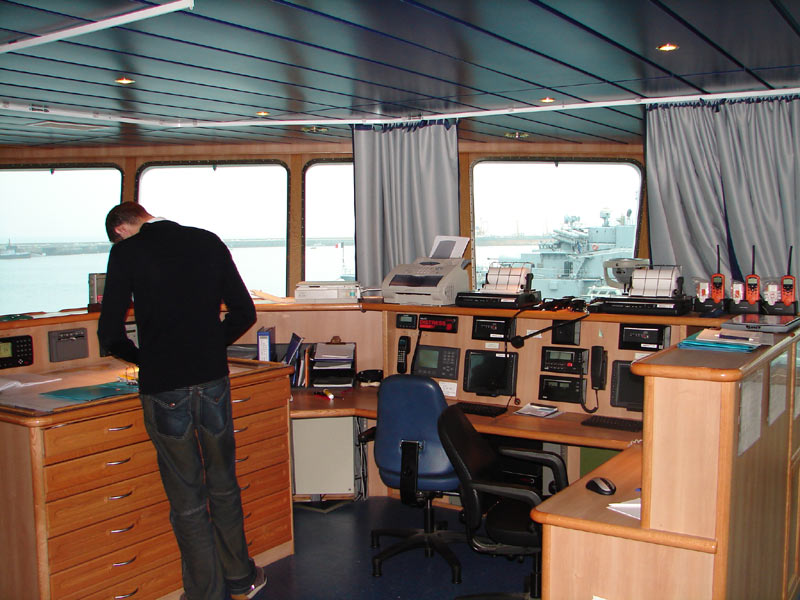
Navigation station on a ship

The navigation station of a ship may be located on the bridge or in a separate chart room, nearby. It includes a table sized for nautical charts where calculations of course and location are made. The navigator plots the course to be followed by the ship on these charts. Besides the desk and the navigation charts, the area contains navigational instruments that may include electronic equipment for a Global Positioning System receiver and chart display, fathometer, a compass, a marine chronometer, two-way radios, and radiotelephone, etc.

=== Flying bridge ===
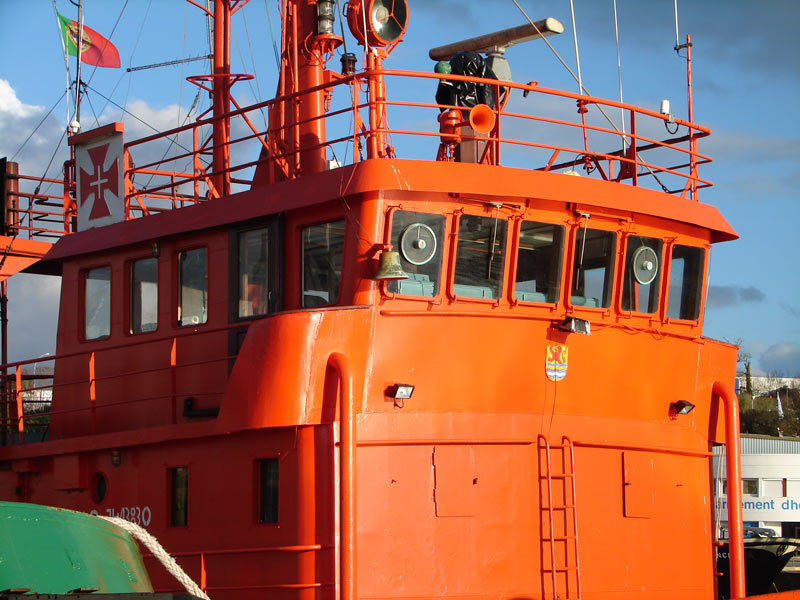
Wheelhouse on a tugboat, topped with a flying bridge

A flying bridge, also known as "monkey island", is an open area on top of a surface ship that provides unobstructed views of the fore, aft, and the sides of a vessel. It serves as an operating station for the ship's officers, such as the captain or officer of the watch.

Prior to World War II, virtually every sailing ship, steamship, monitor, paddle steamer, or large pleasure ship had a flying bridge above the main bridge. Flying bridges were generally not enclosed at all (although sometimes they were partially enclosed), and often had little equipment—usually just a speaking tube or telephone to allow communication with the helmsman or wheelman on the main bridge. On military warships after 1914, the flying bridge was usually the station for the air defense officer and the gunnery officer. The amount of equipment on a flying bridge varies widely with the need of the captain. During World War II, for example, American submarine chaser surface ships had a well-outfitted flying bridge which usually contained a pelorus, signal lamps, telescope, and voice tube to permit the captain to command the ship. U.S. Navy attack transport ships could be outfitted with either 20mm or 40mm automatic cannons on their flying bridges.

Flying bridges were almost always the highest bridge on the ship. They were usually above the flag bridge.

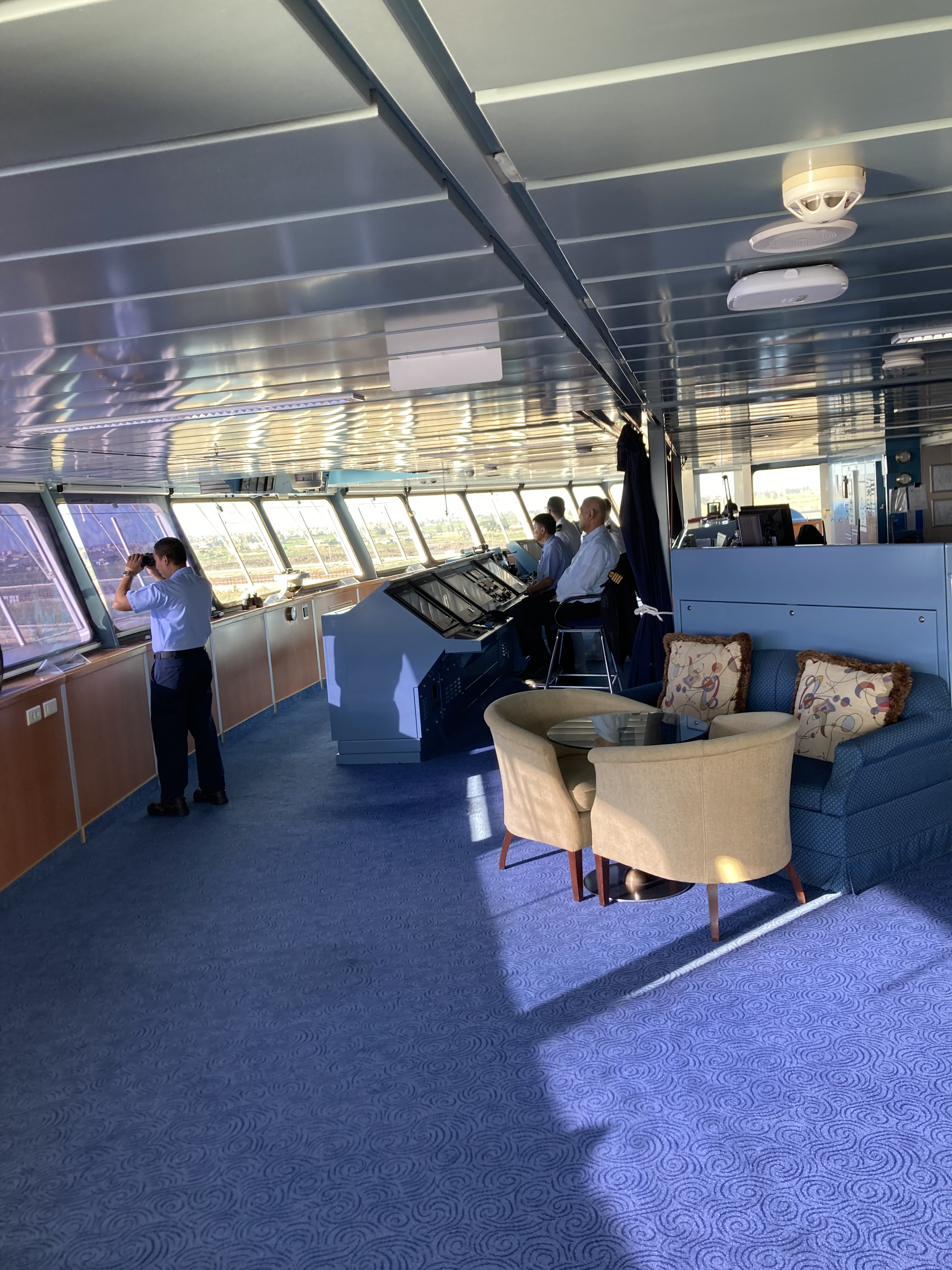
Appearance of a bridge on a cruise ship

Since the 1980s, large pleasure craft may have a flying bridge toward the stern that is used as additional outdoor seating space and a place to store a tender. On the smallest surface vessels, such as a sport fishing boat, the flying bridge may have controls permitting the ship to be piloted from the flying bridge, but will lack the full range of controls of the pilot house. On larger small vessels, the flying bridge may actually be enclosed, in which case it is more properly called an "upper pilot house" or "upper bridge".

=== Flag bridge ===
Warships that were also flagships (had a flag officer onboard) sometimes contained a flag bridge. Also known as the "admiral's bridge", these were a bridge below the main bridge on a command warship where a high-ranking officer such as an admiral could conduct fleet operations, plan strategy, and conduct large battles.

=== Bridge wing ===
The bridge wing of MS Amera while in use

Some flying bridges have "bridge wings", open areas which thrust outward from the flying bridge over the sides of the vessel by approximately 10 to 15 feet (3.0 to 4.6 m) to allow an officer to see the side of their ship while docking or working with smaller vessels. A bridge wing is a narrow walkway extending from both sides of a pilothouse to the full width of a ship or slightly beyond, to allow bridge personnel a full view to aid in the maneuvering of the ship. Officers use bridge wings when docking or maneuvering in locks and narrow waterways. Each bridge wing may be equipped with a console controlling the bow thruster, stern thruster, rudder and engines.

== See also ==
- Cab (locomotive)
- Cockpit (sailing)
- Command center
- Control room
- Deck department
- Engine department
