= Sport fishing boat =

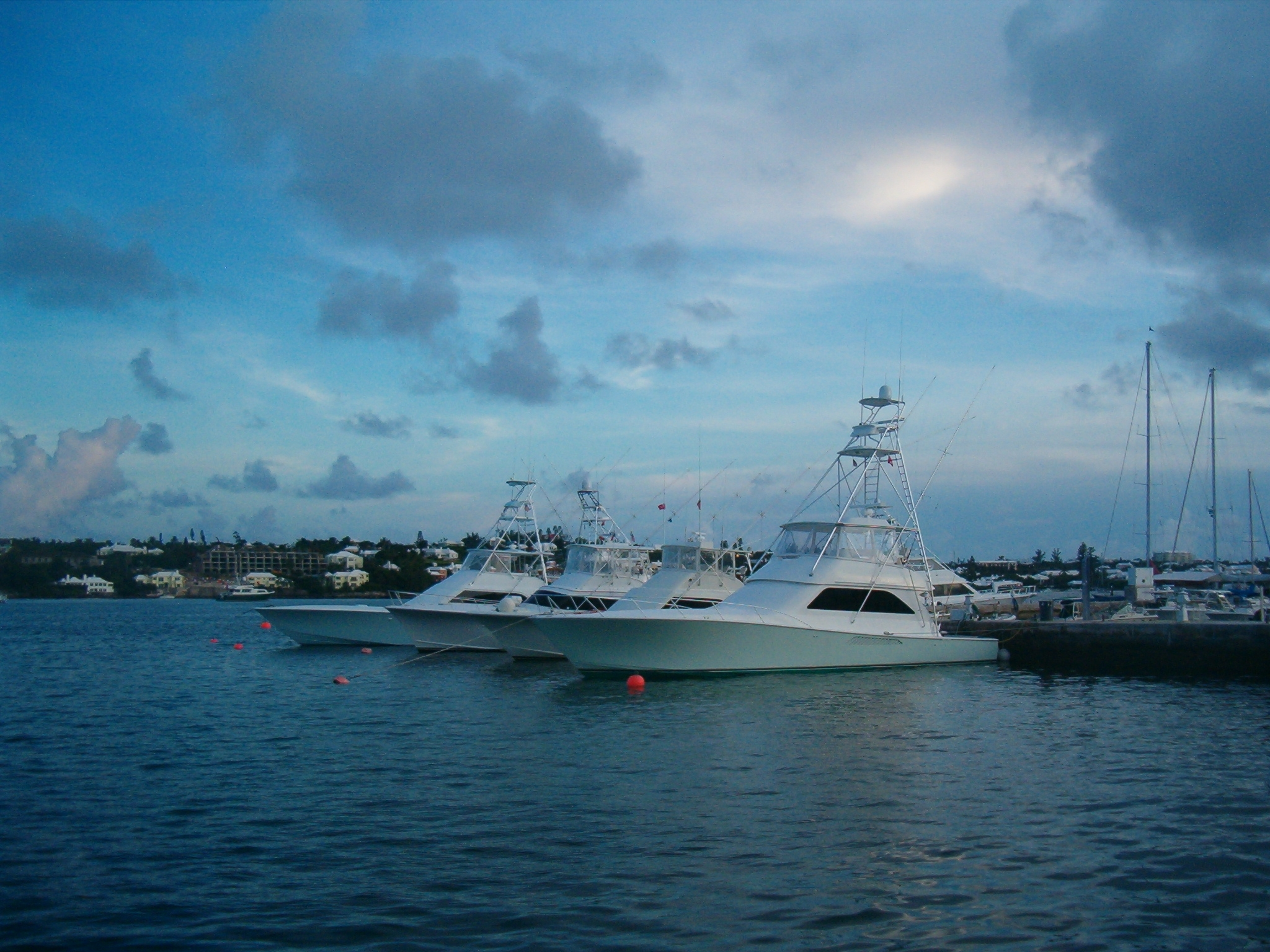
Sport fishers at the Royal Bermuda Yacht Club

A sport fishing boat, or sport fisher, is a type of power boat designed for recreational boat fishing, usually for angling or trolling with rods on open water, often while travelling at speed.

Typically, these boats are designed with a cockpit at the stern, fitted with a chair fixed to the deck to which a rod can be secured. Alternately, other rods can be used by hand or mounted to the stern or the gunwale. These boats usually have long, high foredeck leading back to a rear-set cabin, which has a flybridge set above. Many such boats are also equipped with on-board fishfinders, as well as a live well to keep captured fish alive.

Some boats used for sport fishing feature a center-console setup, in which the captain is positioned in the center of the boat and lines can be cast any direction around the deck, as opposed to a sportfish design in which lines can only be cast from the rear of the boat.

Bass boats are a subtype of small sport fishers specifically designed for bass fishing, typically with a bow-mounted trolling motor for slow maneuvers in shallow inland waters.

== See also ==
- Sport Fishing and Boating Partnership Council
- Coastal and offshore rowing
