= List of New York Islanders broadcasters =

List of New York Islanders broadcasters presents an excerpt as an overview of television and radio broadcasters sorted by year.

== Television ==
Year	Channel	Play-by-play	Color commentator(s)	Rinkside reporter	Studio host	Studio analysts
1972–73	WOR-TV	Jim Gordon and Ed Cain			Spencer Ross	
1973–74	WOR-TV	Hal Kelly and Dave Martin or Hawley Chester				
1974–75	WOR-TV	Tim Ryan	George Michael			
1974–75	HBO (playoffs only)	Spencer Ross	Stan Fischler			
1975–76	WOR-TV	Tim Ryan	George Michael			
1975–76	HBO	Spencer Ross	Stan Fischler			
1976–77	WOR-TV	Tim Ryan	George Michael			
1976–77	Cablevision Sports 3	Spencer Ross	Stan Fischler			
1977–78	WOR-TV	Tim Ryan	George Michael			
1977–78	Cablevision Sports 3	Tim Ryan	Stan Fischler			
1978–79	WOR-TV	Tim Ryan	Eddie Giacomin			
1978–79	SportsChannel New York	Steve Albert	Stan Fischler			
1979–80	WOR-TV	Tim Ryan	Ed Westfall	Stan Fischler		
1979–80	SportsChannel New York	Steve Albert	Ed Westfall	Stan Fischler		
1980–81	SportsChannel New York	Jiggs McDonald	Ed Westfall	Stan Fischler		
1980–81	WOR-TV	Tim Ryan	Ed Westfall	Stan Fischler		
1981–82	SportsChannel New York	Jiggs McDonald	Ed Westfall	Stan Fischler		
1981–82	WOR-TV	Jiggs McDonald	Ed Westfall	Stan Fischler		
1982–83	SportsChannel New York	Jiggs McDonald	Ed Westfall	Stan Fischler		
1982–83	WOR-TV	Jiggs McDonald	Ed Westfall	Stan Fischler		
1983–84	SportsChannel New York	Jiggs McDonald	Ed Westfall	Stan Fischler		
1983–84	WOR-TV	Jiggs McDonald	Ed Westfall	Stan Fischler		
1984–85	SportsChannel New York	Jiggs McDonald	Ed Westfall	Stan Fischler		
1984–85	WOR-TV	Jiggs McDonald	Ed Westfall	Stan Fischler		
1985–86	SportsChannel New York	Jiggs McDonald	Ed Westfall	Stan Fischler		
1986–87	SportsChannel New York	Jiggs McDonald	Ed Westfall	Stan Fischler		
1987–88	SportsChannel New York	Jiggs McDonald	Ed Westfall	Stan Fischler		
1988–89	SportsChannel New York	Jiggs McDonald	Ed Westfall	Stan Fischler		
1989–90	SportsChannel New York	Jiggs McDonald	Ed Westfall	Stan Fischler		
1990–91	SportsChannel New York	Jiggs McDonald	Ed Westfall	Stan Fischler		
1991–92	SportsChannel New York	Jiggs McDonald	Ed Westfall	Stan Fischler		
1992–93	SportsChannel New York	Jiggs McDonald	Ed Westfall	Stan Fischler		
1993–94	SportsChannel New York	Jiggs McDonald	Ed Westfall	Stan Fischler		
1994–95	SportsChannel New York	Jiggs McDonald	Ed Westfall	Stan Fischler		
1995–96	SportsChannel New York	Howie Rose	Ed Westfall	Stan Fischler		
1996–97	SportsChannel New York	Howie Rose	Ed Westfall	Stan Fischler		
1997–98	SportsChannel New York	Howie Rose	Ed Westfall		Stan Fischler	Mike Crispino
1998–99	Fox Sports New York	Howie Rose	Joe Micheletti (primary); Ed Westfall (during Micheletti's NHL on Fox assignments)		Stan Fischler	Mike Crispino
1999–2000	Fox Sports New York	Howie Rose	Joe Micheletti (primary); Ed Westfall (during Micheletti's NHL on ABC assignments)		Stan Fischler	Mike Crispino
2000–01	Fox Sports Net New York	Howie Rose	Joe Micheletti (primary); Ed Westfall (select games during Micheletti's NHL on ABC assignments); Mike Crispino (select games during Micheletti's NHL on ABC assignments)		Stan Fischler	
2001–02	Fox Sports Net New York	Howie Rose	Joe Micheletti (primary); Ed Westfall (select games during Micheletti's NHL on ABC assignments); Mike Crispino (select games during Micheletti's NHL on ABC assignments)		Deb Placey	
2002–03	Fox Sports Net New York	Howie Rose	Joe Micheletti (primary); Ed Westfall (select games during Micheletti's NHL on ABC assignments); Mike Crispino (select games during Micheletti's NHL on ABC assignments)		Deb Placey	
2003–04	Fox Sports Net New York	Howie Rose	Joe Micheletti (primary); Ed Westfall (select games during Micheletti's NHL on ABC assignments); Mike Crispino (select games during Micheletti's NHL on ABC assignments)	Deb Placey		
2005–06	FSN New York	Howie Rose	Joe Micheletti (primary); Billy Jaffe (during Micheletti's NHL on NBC assignments)	Deb Placey		
2006–07	FSN New York	Howie Rose	Billy Jaffe	Deb Placey		Jean Potvin (select games only)
2007–08	FSN New York	Howie Rose	Billy Jaffe	Deb Placey	Jean Potvin (select games only)	Butch Goring
2008–09	MSG Plus	Howie Rose	Billy Jaffe	CJ Papa	Butch Goring	
2009–10	MSG Plus	Howie Rose	Billy Jaffe	Rob Carlin or Deb Placey	Butch Goring	
2010–11	MSG Plus	Howie Rose	Butch Goring	Rob Carlin or Deb Placey	Butch Goring	Stan Fischler
2011–12	MSG Plus	Howie Rose	Butch Goring		Peter Ruttgaizer	Stan Fischler
2013	MSG Plus	Howie Rose	Butch Goring		Peter Ruttgaizer	Stan Fischler
2013–14	MSG Plus	Howie Rose	Butch Goring		Peter Ruttgaizer	Stan Fischler
2014–15	MSG Plus	Howie Rose	Butch Goring		Shannon Hogan	Stan Fischler, Mike Bossy, and Rick DiPietro
2015–16	MSG Plus	Howie Rose	Butch Goring		Shannon Hogan	Stan Fischler, Mike Bossy, and Rick DiPietro
2016–17	MSG Plus	Brendan Burke	Butch Goring		Shannon Hogan	
2017–18	MSG Plus	Brendan Burke	Butch Goring		Shannon Hogan	
2018–19	MSG Plus	Brendan Burke	Butch Goring	A.J. Mleczko (select games); Jennifer Botterill (select games)	Shannon Hogan	A.J. Mleczko and Jennifer Botterill
2019–20	MSG Plus	Brendan Burke	Butch Goring	A.J. Mleczko (select games); Jennifer Botterill (select games)	Shannon Hogan	A.J. Mleczko and Jennifer Botterill
2021	MSG Plus	Brendan Burke	Butch Goring	A.J. Mleczko (select games); Jennifer Botterill (select games)	Shannon Hogan	A.J. Mleczko
2021–22	MSG Plus (primary); MSG Network (during Knicks, Rangers, and Devils off-days)	Brendan Burke (most games); Jiggs McDonald (select games); Chris King (emergency); Alan Fuehring (select games)	Butch Goring (most games); A. J. Mleczko (select games); Anson Carter (select games)	A. J. Mleczko (select games); Anson Carter (select games)	Shannon Hogan	A. J. Mleczko (select games); Anson Carter (select games)
2022–23	MSG Sportsnet (primary); MSG Network (during Knicks, Rangers, and Devils off-days)	Brendan Burke (most games); Alan Fuehring (select games)	Butch Goring (most games); A. J. Mleczko (select games); Thomas Hickey (select games)	A. J. Mleczko (select games); Thomas Hickey (select games)	Shannon Hogan	A. J. Mleczko (select games); Thomas Hickey (select games)
2023–24	MSG Sportsnet (primary); MSG Network (during Knicks, Rangers, and Devils off-days)	Brendan Burke (most games); Alan Fuehring (select games)	Butch Goring (most games); Thomas Hickey (select games); A. J. Mleczko (select games)	Thomas Hickey (select games); A. J. Mleczko (select games)	Shannon Hogan	Thomas Hickey and A. J. Mleczko

The Islanders had very limited over-the-air television in the 1970s and early '80s as they shared WOR with the Rangers, Knicks and Nets. In their first two seasons, home games were televised by Teleprompter Cable. Cable coverage returned on HBO for the 1975 playoffs and 1975-76 season. Home telecasts went to LI Cable (later renamed SportsChannel) and have remained there since.

== Radio ==
Year	Stations	Play-by-play	Color commentator(s)	Studio host	Intermission Analyst
1972–73	WNBC & WHN	Al Albert	Jack DeCelles		
1973–74	WHN	Al Albert			
1974–75	WMCA	Dom Valentino	Jim Garvey		
1975–76	WMCA	John Sterling	Bob Lawrence		
1976–77	WMCA	John Sterling	Bob Lawrence		
1976–77	WGBB	John Sterling	Bob Lawrence		
1977–78	WMCA	John Sterling	Bob Lawrence		
1977–78	WGBB	John Sterling	Bob Lawrence		
1977–78	WGLI	John Sterling	Bob Lawrence		
1978–79	WMCA	Simulcast of TV broadcast or Bob Lawrence	No color commentators	Bob Lawrence	
1978–79	WGBB	Simulcast of TV broadcast or Bob Lawrence	No color commentators	Bob Lawrence	
1979–80	WMCA	Simulcast of TV broadcast or Bob Lawrence	Simulcast of TV broadcast or Jean Potvin	Bob Lawrence	
1979–80	WGBB	Simulcast of TV broadcast or Bob Lawrence	Simulcast of TV broadcast or Jean Potvin	Bob Lawrence	
1979–80	WALK	Simulcast of TV broadcast or Bob Lawrence	Simulcast of TV broadcast or Jean Potvin	Bob Lawrence	
1980–81	WMCA	Simulcast of TV broadcast or Barry Landers	Simulcast of TV broadcast or Jean Potvin	Barry Landers	
1980–81	WGBB	Simulcast of TV broadcast or Barry Landers	Simulcast of TV broadcast or Jean Potvin	Barry Landers	
1981–82	WMCA	Barry Landers	Jean Potvin		
1981–82	WGBB	Barry Landers	Jean Potvin		
1982–83	WMCA	Barry Landers	Jean Potvin		
1982–83	WGBB	Barry Landers	Jean Potvin		
1983–84	WOR	Barry Landers	Jean Potvin		
1984–85	WOR	Barry Landers	Jean Potvin	Joel Blumberg	
1985–86	WOR	Barry Landers	Jean Potvin	Joel Blumberg	
1986–87	WOR	Barry Landers	Jean Potvin	Joel Blumberg	
1987–88	WOR	Barry Landers	Jean Potvin	Joel Blumberg	
1987–88	WGBB	Barry Landers	Jean Potvin	Joel Blumberg	
1988–89	WEVD	Barry Landers	Jean Potvin	Joel Blumberg	
1988–89	WGBB	Barry Landers	Jean Potvin	Joel Blumberg	
1989–90	WEVD	Barry Landers	Bob Nystrom	Joel Blumberg	
1989–90	WGBB	Barry Landers	Bob Nystrom	Joel Blumberg	
1990–91	WEVD	Barry Landers	Bob Nystrom	Joel Blumberg	
1990–91	WGBB	Barry Landers	Bob Nystrom	Joel Blumberg	
1991–92	WPAT	Barry Landers	Bob Nystrom	Joel Blumberg	
1991–92	WGBB	Barry Landers	Bob Nystrom	Joel Blumberg	
1992–93	WPAT	Barry Landers	Bob Nystrom	Joel Blumberg	
1992–93	WGBB	Barry Landers	Bob Nystrom	Joel Blumberg	
1993–94	WRCN	Barry Landers	Bob Nystrom	Joel Blumberg	
1993–94	WGBB	Barry Landers	Bob Nystrom	Joel Blumberg	
1994–95	WRCN	Barry Landers	Bob Nystrom		
1995–96	WRCN	Barry Landers	Bob Nystrom		
1996–97	WLIR	Barry Landers	Bob Nystrom		
1997–98	WLIR	Jim Cerny	Chris Botta and Wayne Merrick		
1998–99	WJWR	Jim Cerny	Chris Botta		
1999–2000	WJWR	Jim Cerny	Chris King		
2000–01	WJWR	Jim Cerny	Chris King		
2001–02	WEVD	John Wiedeman	Chris King		
2002–03	WEVD	John Wiedeman	Chris King		
2003–04	WEPN	John Wiedeman	Chris King		
2005–06	WBBR	John Wiedeman	Chris King		
2006–07	WBBR	Steve Mears	Chris King		
2007–08	WBBR	Steve Mears	Chris King		
2008–09	WMJC	Steve Mears	Chris King		
2009–10	WMJC	Simulcast of TV Broadcast		Chris King	
2010–11	WRHU	Chris King	Selected Hofstra University radio student		
2011–12	WRHU	Chris King	Selected Hofstra University radio student		
2013	WRHU	Chris King	Selected Hofstra University radio student		
2013–14	WRHU	Chris King	Selected Hofstra University radio student		
2013–14	WRCN	Chris King	Selected Hofstra University radio student		
2014–15	WRHU	Chris King	Selected Hofstra University radio student		
2014–15	WRCN	Chris King	Selected Hofstra University radio student		
2015–16	WRHU	Chris King	Greg Picker	Selected Hofstra University radio student	
2015–16	WNYE	Chris King	Greg Picker	Selected Hofstra University radio student	
2015–16	WRCN	Chris King	Greg Picker	Selected Hofstra University radio student	
2016–17	WRHU, WFAN	Chris King	Greg Picker	Selected Hofstra University radio student	
2016–17	WCBS (when not on WFAN)	Chris King	Greg Picker	Selected Hofstra University radio student	
2016–17	WNYM (when not on WFAN)	Chris King	Greg Picker	Selected Hofstra University radio student	
2016–17	WRCN (when not on WFAN)	Chris King	Greg Picker	Selected Hofstra University radio student	
2017–18	WRHU, WFAN	Chris King	Greg Picker	Selected Hofstra University radio student	
2017–18	WNYM(when not on WFAN)	Chris King	Greg Picker	Selected Hofstra University radio student	
2017–18	WMCA (when not on WFAN)	Chris King	Greg Picker	Selected Hofstra University radio student	
2017–18	WRCN (when not on WFAN)	Chris King	Greg Picker	Selected Hofstra University radio student	
2018–19	WRHU	Chris King	Greg Picker	Selected Hofstra University radio student	
2018–19	WRCN	Chris King	Greg Picker	Selected Hofstra University radio student	
2018–19	Radio.com	Chris King	Greg Picker	Selected Hofstra University radio student	
2019–20	WRHU	Chris King	Greg Picker	Selected Hofstra University radio student	Cory Wright
2019–20	WEPN (AM)	Chris King	Greg Picker	Selected Hofstra University radio student	Cory Wright
2019–20	WRCN-FM	Chris King	Greg Picker	Selected Hofstra University radio student	Cory Wright
2021	WRHU, WEPN (AM)	Chris King Alan Fuehring (Emergency)	Greg Picker	Selected Hofstra University radio student	Cory Wright
2021	WNYM, WRCN-FM	Chris King Alan Fuehring (Emergency)	Greg Picker	Selected Hofstra University radio student	Cory Wright
2021–22	WRHU, WEPN (AM), WRCN-FM	Chris King Greg Picker (Emergency)	Greg Picker Cory Wright (Emergency)	Selected Hofstra University radio student	Cory Wright
2022–23	WRHU	Chris King	Greg Picker Cory Wright (Emergency)	Selected Hofstra University radio student	Cory Wright
2022–23	WEPN (AM)	Chris King	Greg Picker Cory Wright (Emergency)	Selected Hofstra University radio student	Cory Wright
2022–23	WRCN-FM	Chris King	Greg Picker Cory Wright (Emergency)	Selected Hofstra University radio student	Cory Wright
2023–24	WRHU	Chris King	Greg Picker	Selected Hofstra University radio student	Cory Wright
2023–24	WEPN (AM)	Chris King	Greg Picker	Selected Hofstra University radio student	Cory Wright
2023–24	WRCN-FM	Chris King	Greg Picker	Selected Hofstra University radio student	Cory Wright
2024-25	WRHU	Chris King	Greg Picker		
2024-25	WRCN-FM	Chris King	Greg Picker		
2025-26	WRHU, WRCN-FM	Alan Fuehring (Simulcast of TV broadcast when Alan Fuehring is doing TV)	Josh Bailey (occasionally)		
2026-27	WRHU, WRCN-FM, WBNR, WGHQ, WLNA	Alan Fuehring (Simulcast of TV broadcast when Alan Fuehring is doing TV)	Eric Cairns, Josh Bailey (occasionally)		

The full schedule was not carried on radio until 1978–79. WHN (1972–74) and WMCA (1974–78) carried all home games and most road games, but conflicts with Nets home games prevented some road games from being on radio.

== Alternate announcers ==
=== Television ===
==== Play-by-play ====
- George Michael: 1974–1976
- Steve Albert: 1976–1980
- Stan Fischler: 1977–1978
- Tim Ryan: 1978–1980
- Al Albert circa 1983
- Spencer Ross: 1987-1989
- Barry Landers: 1989-1995
- Mike Crispino: Late 1990s
- Jiggs McDonald: 1981; 2006–present
- Steve Mears: 2008
- Kenny Albert: 2010

=== Radio ===
==== Play-by-play ====
- Kenny Albert: 1989–1992
- Gary Stanley: circa 1994
- Jim Cerny: 1997–2001
- Chris King: 2008
- Alan Fuehring: 2021
- Greg Picker: 2022
