= 2025–26 NHL season =

National Hockey League season

- League: National Hockey League
- Sport: Ice hockey
- Duration: October 7, 2025 – June 14, 2026
- Games: 82
- Teams: 32
- TV partner(s): Sportsnet/SN1/SN360, Citytv, CBC, TVA Sports (Canada); ESPN/ABC/ESPN2, TNT/TBS/truTV (United States)
- Streaming partner(s): Sportsnet+, Amazon Prime Video (Canada); ESPN app/Hulu/Disney+, HBO Max (United States)

Draft
- Top draft pick: Matthew Schaefer
- Picked by: New York Islanders

Regular season
- Presidents' Trophy: Colorado Avalanche
- Season MVP: Nikita Kucherov (Lightning)
- Top scorer: Connor McDavid (Oilers)

Playoffs
- Playoffs MVP: Jordan Staal (Hurricanes)

Stanley Cup
- Champions: Carolina Hurricanes
- Runners-up: Vegas Golden Knights

NHL seasons
- 2024–25 2026–27

The 2025–26 NHL season was the 109th season of operation (108th season of play) of the National Hockey League (NHL). The regular season began on October 7, 2025, and was the final regular season played under the 82-game schedule before the schedule expands to 84 games in 2026–27. A mid-season break took place in February due to the NHL's participation in the 2026 Winter Olympics in Italy. The Stanley Cup playoffs began in April 2026 and ended on June 14, with the Carolina Hurricanes defeating the Vegas Golden Knights in six games to capture their second Stanley Cup in franchise history and first since 2006.

After playing the previous season under its temporary identity, the Utah Hockey Club was renamed the Utah Mammoth in the off-season.

== League business ==
=== Collective bargaining agreement ===
The 2020 extension of the 2013 collective bargaining agreement (CBA) expires at the end of the 2025–26 NHL season. On June 27, 2025, the league and the NHL Players' Association agreed on a new four-year extension that will take effect from the 2026–27 to 2029–30 seasons. Among the changes under the agreement, the 2026–27 regular season expands from 82 to 84 games, featuring two more divisional games.

=== Entry draft ===
The 2025 NHL entry draft took place on June 27–28, 2025, at the Peacock Theater in Los Angeles.

=== Utah rebranding ===
After opting to play the 2024–25 season with a temporary identity, the Utah Hockey Club announced on January 29, 2025, that fans attending their following four home games in late January and early February could vote for a permanent identity for the club, with the final three options being the existing Utah Hockey Club, Utah Mammoth, and Utah Wasatch. While the Wasatch name was not one of the six finalists, it was intended to honor the idea of a mythical snow creature similar to the yeti, with a "Utah-centric" approach inspired by the Wasatch Mountains; though originally considered a likely name, "Yeti" or "Yetis" had been ruled out as a choice following trademark disputes with Yeti Holdings. One day later, on January 30, the team announced that "Wasatch" was being removed from the survey, being replaced by previously announced option "Utah Outlaws".

On April 30, 2025, speculation arose that "Mammoth" was the selected name following leaks online that showed the team changing its YouTube handle to "UtahMammoth." This speculation was confirmed on May 7, 2025, when the team officially revealed their permanent name as the "Utah Mammoth." A new logo and uniforms were revealed as well, retaining the same color and striping scheme.

== Coaching changes ==
Coaching changes
Off–season
Team	2024–25 coach	2025–26 coach	Notes
Anaheim Ducks	Greg Cronin	Joel Quenneville	On April 19, 2025, three days after the conclusion of their season, the Ducks fired Cronin. In two seasons with Anaheim, Cronin compiled a 62–87–15 record, missing the playoffs in both years. Quenneville, most recently head coach of the Florida Panthers from 2019 to 2021, was named head coach on May 8.
Boston Bruins	Jim Montgomery; Joe Sacco*	Marco Sturm	Montgomery was fired on November 19, 2024, after the Bruins started the season 8–9–3. In just over two seasons with the Bruins, Montgomery totaled a 120–41–23 record with two playoff appearances, including a Presidents' Trophy in 2023 following one of the greatest regular seasons in NHL history. Sacco, a Bruins assistant coach, and formerly head coach of the Colorado Avalanche from 2009 to 2013, was named interim head coach the same day, and finished out the season with a 24–30–6 record. Sturm, most recently head coach of the Los Angeles Kings' AHL affiliate, the Ontario Reign, and who played five seasons for the Bruins from 2005 to 2010, was named head coach on June 5.
Chicago Blackhawks	Luke Richardson; Anders Sorensen*	Jeff Blashill	Richardson was fired on December 5, 2024, after the Blackhawks began the season 8–16–2. In just over two seasons with Chicago, Richardson totaled a 57–118–15 record, failing to reach the playoffs in either completed year. Sorensen, previously the head coach of the Blackhawks' AHL affiliate, the Rockford IceHogs, was named interim head coach the same day. Sorensen became the first Swedish-born head coach in NHL history, and finished out the season with a 17–30–9 record. Blashill, most recently an assistant coach with the Tampa Bay Lightning, and previously head coach of the Detroit Red Wings from 2015 to 2022, was named head coach on May 22.
Dallas Stars	Peter DeBoer	Glen Gulutzan	DeBoer was fired on June 6, 2025, eight days after the Stars' elimination from the 2025 Stanley Cup playoffs. In three seasons with the team, DeBoer recorded a 149–68–29 record, reaching the Western Conference finals in all three seasons, but failing to advance to the Stanley Cup Final. Gulutzan, who had previously coached Dallas from 2011 to 2013, and most recently served as an assistant coach with the Edmonton Oilers, was named head coach on July 1.
New York Rangers	Peter Laviolette	Mike Sullivan	Laviolette was fired on April 19, 2025, two days after the conclusion of the Rangers' season. In two seasons with the Rangers, Laviolette recorded a 94–59–11 record, winning the Presidents' Trophy and reaching the Eastern Conference finals in his first year, but missing the playoffs in his second. Sullivan, most recently the head coach of the Pittsburgh Penguins from 2015 to 2025, was named head coach on May 2.
Philadelphia Flyers	John Tortorella; Brad Shaw*	Rick Tocchet	Tortorella was fired on March 27, 2025, with the Flyers holding a 28–36–9 record, and after a 1–10–1 record in their 12 games prior to Tortorella's dismissal. In just under three seasons with Philadelphia, Tortorella posted a 97–107–33 record, with no playoff appearances. Shaw, previously an assistant coach, was named interim head coach the same day, and compiled a 5–3–1 record over the final nine games of the season. Tocchet, most recently the head coach of the Vancouver Canucks from 2023 to 2025, and who played 11 seasons for the Flyers from 1984 to 1992 and 2000 to 2002, was named head coach on May 14.
Pittsburgh Penguins	Mike Sullivan	Dan Muse	Sullivan and the Penguins mutually agreed to part ways on April 28, 2025, 11 days after the conclusion of the Penguins' season. In nine and a half seasons with Pittsburgh, Sullivan totaled a 409–255–89 record, reaching the playoffs seven times and winning back-to-back Stanley Cup championships in 2016 and 2017. Muse, most recently an assistant coach with the New York Rangers, was named head coach on June 4.
Seattle Kraken	Dan Bylsma	Lane Lambert	Bylsma was fired on April 21, 2025, six days after the conclusion of the Kraken's season. Bylsma recorded a 35–41–6 record in his only season with Seattle, missing the playoffs. Lambert, most recently an assistant coach for the Toronto Maple Leafs, and previously head coach of the New York Islanders from 2022 to 2024, was named head coach on May 29.
Vancouver Canucks	Rick Tocchet	Adam Foote	On April 29, 2025, fourteen days after the conclusion of the Canucks' season, Tocchet and the Canucks mutually agreed to part ways. In two and-a-half seasons with Vancouver, Tocchet recorded a 108–65–27 record with one playoff appearance, reaching the second round in 2024. Foote, the assistant coach, was promoted to head coach on May 14.
In–season
Team	Outgoing coach	Incoming coach	Notes
Columbus Blue Jackets	Dean Evason	Rick Bowness	Evason was fired on January 12, 2026, after Columbus began the season 19–19–7. In a season and a half with Columbus, Evason totaled a 59–52–16 record, missing the playoffs in his one completed season. Bowness, most recently head coach of the Winnipeg Jets from 2022 to 2024 before retiring at the conclusion of the 2023–24 season, was named head coach the same day.
Los Angeles Kings	Jim Hiller	D. J. Smith*	Hiller was fired on March 1, 2026, after the Kings started the season 24–21–14, including a 2–5–1 record in his final eight games. In parts of three seasons with Los Angeles, Hiller posted a 93–58–24 record, reaching the playoffs in both of his completed seasons, but losing to the Edmonton Oilers in the first round both times. Smith, most recently an assistant coach for Los Angeles, and formerly head coach of the Ottawa Senators from 2019 to 2023, was named interim head coach the same day.
New York Islanders	Patrick Roy	Peter DeBoer	Roy was fired on April 5, 2026, with four games remaining in the season, after the Islanders started the season 42–31–5, including a 3–7–0 in his final 10 games and a four-game losing streak immediately preceding his dismissal. In parts of three seasons with the Islanders, Roy recorded a 97–78–22 record, with one playoff appearance. DeBoer, most recently head coach of the Dallas Stars from 2022 to 2025, was named head coach the same day.
Vegas Golden Knights	Bruce Cassidy	John Tortorella	Cassidy was fired on March 29, 2026, with eight games remaining in the season, after the Golden Knights started the season 32–26–16, including a 3–5–2 record in his final ten games. In just under four seasons with Vegas, Cassidy recorded a 178–99–43 record, with three playoff appearances, leading the franchise to its first Stanley Cup championship in 2023. Tortorella, most recently head coach of the Philadelphia Flyers from 2022 to 2025, was named head coach the same day.

(*) Indicates interim

== Front office changes ==
General managers
Off–season
Team	2024–25 general manager	2025–26 general manager	Notes
Los Angeles Kings	Rob Blake	Ken Holland	On May 5, 2025, four days after the Kings' first-round elimination from the playoffs, Blake and the Kings mutually agreed to part ways. Blake had served as general manager since 2017, overseeing five playoff appearances, but never advancing past the first round. Holland, who was most recently general manager of the Edmonton Oilers from 2019 to 2024, was named general manager on May 14.
New York Islanders	Lou Lamoriello	Mathieu Darche	On April 22, 2025, five days after the conclusion of the Islanders' season, and with his contract expiring, the team announced that Lamoriello would not return as general manager. Lamoriello had served as general manager of the Islanders since 2018, overseeing five playoff berths, including two Eastern Conference finals appearances. Darche, who had been an assistant general manager with the Tampa Bay Lightning since 2022, was named general manager on May 23.
Seattle Kraken	Ron Francis	Jason Botterill	On April 22, 2025, Francis was promoted to president of hockey operations. Botterill, an assistant general manager, who was previously general manager of the Buffalo Sabres from 2017 to 2020, was promoted to general manager the same day.
In–season
Team	Outgoing general manager	Incoming general manager	Notes
Buffalo Sabres	Kevyn Adams	Jarmo Kekäläinen	Adams was fired on December 15, 2025, after the Sabres began the season 14–14–4. Adams had served as the Sabres' general manager since 2020, with the team missing the playoffs in all five completed seasons of his tenure, extending the longest playoff drought in NHL history, dating back to 2011. Kekalainen, who had been hired as a senior advisor by Buffalo in May 2025, and previously served as general manager of the Columbus Blue Jackets from 2013 to 2024, was named general manager the same day.
New Jersey Devils	Tom Fitzgerald	None (in-season); Sunny Mehta (2026–27)	Fitzgerald was fired on April 6, 2026, after the Devils began the season 40–34–3. Fitzgerald had served as the Devils' general manager since 2020, as well as president of hockey operations since 2024, overseeing two playoff berths in six completed seasons. The Devils finished out the season without naming an interim general manager, before naming former Florida Panthers assistant general manager Sunny Mehta as their new general manager immediately following the conclusion of their regular season schedule.
Toronto Maple Leafs	Brad Treliving	Ryan Hardy*; Brandon Pridham*	Treliving was fired on March 30, 2026, after the Maple Leafs began the season 31–30–13. Treliving had served as the Maple Leafs' general manager since 2023, overseeing playoff berths in his two completed seasons. The following day, Toronto announced that assistant general managers Hardy and Pridham would serve as co-interim general managers for the remainder of the season.

(*) Indicates interim

Ownership
In–season
Team	Outgoing ownership	Incoming ownership	Notes
Pittsburgh Penguins	Fenway Sports Group	Hoffmann Family of Companies	On December 17, 2025, Penguins ownership group, Fenway Sports, agreed in principle on a sale of controlling interest of the club to the private equity firm, Hoffman Family of Companies. The NHL approved of the sale on December 19, 2025. The Hoffman Family of Companies also owns the Florida Everblades of the ECHL and their arena, Hertz Arena.

== Arena changes ==
- Amalie Arena, the home of the Tampa Bay Lightning, was renamed to Benchmark International Arena on August 13, 2025, under a new deal with Benchmark International, a local mergers and acquisitions firm.
- Wells Fargo Center, the home of the Philadelphia Flyers, was renamed to Xfinity Mobile Arena on August 14, 2025, under a new naming rights deal with Xfinity, a subsidiary of Comcast (which owns the team and arena through its Spectacor division).
- Xcel Energy Center, the home of the Minnesota Wild, was renamed to Grand Casino Arena on September 3, 2025, under a new naming rights deal with Grand Casino Hinckley. Xcel Energy will remain a partner of the team.
- This is the final year on the original 30-year lease on KeyBank Center, the home of the Buffalo Sabres. Erie County, the entity responsible for the lease, announced it would not renew its lease once it expires, and the nominal owner, the city of Buffalo, indicated an inability to afford keeping the arena open. In a statement to the press, Sabres chief operating officer Pete Guelli insisted that the team did not intend to relocate. On July 30, 2025, it was announced by the Buffalo Sabres and KeyBank that the naming rights to KeyBank Center were extended through the 2035–36 season, and on September 27 the franchise confirmed the continuation of the lease of the arena itself through at least September 2031.

== Regular season ==
The regular season began on October 7, 2025, and concluded on April 16, 2026.

=== International games ===
The Nashville Predators and Pittsburgh Penguins played two games against each other on November 14 and 16, 2025, at Avicii Arena in Stockholm, Sweden, with the teams splitting the series.

=== Outdoor games ===
The league has scheduled two outdoor games this season, both planned to be held in Florida:

- The 2026 Winter Classic was held on January 2, 2026, at LoanDepot Park in Miami, with the Florida Panthers hosting the New York Rangers.
- The 2026 Stadium Series was held on February 1, 2026, at Raymond James Stadium in Tampa, with the Tampa Bay Lightning hosting the Boston Bruins.

=== Canceled All–Star Game and Olympics break ===
The 2026 All-Star Game was planned to be held in early February 2026, at UBS Arena in Elmont, New York, the home of the New York Islanders. The league intended to use the game as a "send-off" for the league's players participation at the 2026 Games in Milan and Cortina d'Ampezzo, Italy, with players who would have competed in both leaving directly from New York to Italy. This was scheduled to be the first time that the league participated in the Olympics since 2014, and it would have been the first time the All-Star Game was held in the same year as Olympic participation since 2002. However, the league announced on April 30, 2025, that the game had been canceled, with UBS Arena instead hosting an unspecified Olympic kickoff event. By October 2025, the league decided to cancel the event altogether and postpone UBS Arena's All-Star Game to 2027.

=== Postponed games ===
- The Columbus Blue Jackets home game against the Los Angeles Kings scheduled for January 26, 2026, was postponed to March 9, due to a severe winter storm.

== Standings ==
=== Eastern Conference ===
Top 3 (Metropolitan Division)
Pos	Team	GP	W	L	OTL	RW	GF	GA	GD	Pts
1	z – Carolina Hurricanes	82	53	22	7	39	296	240	+56	113
2	x – Pittsburgh Penguins	82	41	25	16	34	293	268	+25	98
3	x – Philadelphia Flyers	82	43	27	12	27	250	243	+7	98

Source: National Hockey League
Rules for classification: 1) Fewer number of games played (GP, only during regular season); 2) Greater number of regulation wins (RW); 3) Greater number of wins in regulation and overtime, excluding shootout wins (ROW); 4) Greater number of total wins, including shootouts (W); 5) Greater number of points earned in head-to-head play; if teams played an uneven number of head-to-head games, the result of the first game on the home ice of the team with the extra home game is discarded; 6) Greater goal differential (GD); 7) Greater number of goals scored (GF)
x – Clinched playoff spot; z – Clinched conference

Top 3 (Atlantic Division)
Pos	Team	GP	W	L	OTL	RW	GF	GA	GD	Pts
1	y – Buffalo Sabres	82	50	23	9	42	288	241	+47	109
2	x – Tampa Bay Lightning	82	50	26	6	40	290	231	+59	106
3	x – Montreal Canadiens	82	48	24	10	34	283	256	+27	106

Source: National Hockey League
Rules for classification: 1) Fewer number of games played (GP, only during regular season); 2) Greater number of regulation wins (RW); 3) Greater number of wins in regulation and overtime, excluding shootout wins (ROW); 4) Greater number of total wins, including shootouts (W); 5) Greater number of points earned in head-to-head play; if teams played an uneven number of head-to-head games, the result of the first game on the home ice of the team with the extra home game is discarded; 6) Greater goal differential (GD); 7) Greater number of goals scored (GF)
x – Clinched playoff spot; y – Clinched division

Eastern Conference Wild Card
Pos	Div	Team	GP	W	L	OTL	RW	GF	GA	GD	Pts
1	AT	x – Boston Bruins	82	45	27	10	33	272	250	+22	100
2	AT	x – Ottawa Senators	82	44	27	11	38	278	246	+32	99
3	ME	Washington Capitals	82	43	30	9	37	263	244	+19	95
4	AT	Detroit Red Wings	82	41	31	10	30	241	258	−17	92
5	ME	Columbus Blue Jackets	82	40	30	12	28	253	253	0	92
6	ME	New York Islanders	82	43	34	5	29	233	241	−8	91
7	ME	New Jersey Devils	82	42	37	3	29	230	254	−24	87
8	AT	Florida Panthers	82	40	38	4	32	251	276	−25	84
9	AT	Toronto Maple Leafs	82	32	36	14	23	253	299	−46	78
10	ME	New York Rangers	82	34	39	9	25	238	250	−12	77

Source: National Hockey League
Rules for classification: 1) Fewer number of games played (GP, only during regular season); 2) Greater number of regulation wins (RW); 3) Greater number of wins in regulation and overtime, excluding shootout wins (ROW); 4) Greater number of total wins, including shootouts (W); 5) Greater number of points earned in head-to-head play; if teams played an uneven number of head-to-head games, the result of the first game on the home ice of the team with the extra home game is discarded; 6) Greater goal differential (GD); 7) Greater number of goals scored (GF)
x – Clinched playoff spot

=== Western Conference ===
Top 3 (Central Division)
Pos	Team	GP	W	L	OTL	RW	GF	GA	GD	Pts
1	p – Colorado Avalanche	82	55	16	11	48	302	203	+99	121
2	x – Dallas Stars	82	50	20	12	38	279	226	+53	112
3	x – Minnesota Wild	82	46	24	12	31	272	240	+32	104

Source: National Hockey League
Rules for classification: 1) Fewer number of games played (GP, only during regular season); 2) Greater number of regulation wins (RW); 3) Greater number of wins in regulation and overtime, excluding shootout wins (ROW); 4) Greater number of total wins, including shootouts (W); 5) Greater number of points earned in head-to-head play; if teams played an uneven number of head-to-head games, the result of the first game on the home ice of the team with the extra home game is discarded; 6) Greater goal differential (GD); 7) Greater number of goals scored (GF)
p – Clinched Presidents' Trophy; x – Clinched playoff spot

Top 3 (Pacific Division)
Pos	Team	GP	W	L	OTL	RW	GF	GA	GD	Pts
1	y – Vegas Golden Knights	82	39	26	17	30	265	250	+15	95
2	x – Edmonton Oilers	82	41	30	11	32	282	269	+13	93
3	x – Anaheim Ducks	82	43	33	6	26	273	288	−15	92

Source: National Hockey League
Rules for classification: 1) Fewer number of games played (GP, only during regular season); 2) Greater number of regulation wins (RW); 3) Greater number of wins in regulation and overtime, excluding shootout wins (ROW); 4) Greater number of total wins, including shootouts (W); 5) Greater number of points earned in head-to-head play; if teams played an uneven number of head-to-head games, the result of the first game on the home ice of the team with the extra home game is discarded; 6) Greater goal differential (GD); 7) Greater number of goals scored (GF)
x – Clinched playoff spot; y – Clinched division

Western Conference Wild Card
Pos	Div	Team	GP	W	L	OTL	RW	GF	GA	GD	Pts
1	CE	x – Utah Mammoth	82	43	33	6	33	268	240	+28	92
2	PA	x – Los Angeles Kings	82	35	27	20	22	225	247	−22	90
3	CE	St. Louis Blues	82	37	33	12	33	231	258	−27	86
4	CE	Nashville Predators	82	38	34	10	28	247	269	−22	86
5	PA	San Jose Sharks	82	39	35	8	27	251	292	−41	86
6	CE	Winnipeg Jets	82	35	35	12	28	231	260	−29	82
7	PA	Seattle Kraken	82	34	37	11	26	226	263	−37	79
8	PA	Calgary Flames	82	34	39	9	27	212	259	−47	77
9	CE	Chicago Blackhawks	82	29	39	14	22	213	275	−62	72
10	PA	Vancouver Canucks	82	25	49	8	15	216	316	−100	58

Source: National Hockey League
Rules for classification: 1) Fewer number of games played (GP, only during regular season); 2) Greater number of regulation wins (RW); 3) Greater number of wins in regulation and overtime, excluding shootout wins (ROW); 4) Greater number of total wins, including shootouts (W); 5) Greater number of points earned in head-to-head play; if teams played an uneven number of head-to-head games, the result of the first game on the home ice of the team with the extra home game is discarded; 6) Greater goal differential (GD); 7) Greater number of goals scored (GF)
x – Clinched playoff spot

== Playoffs ==
=== Bracket ===
In each round, teams compete in a best-of-seven series following a 2–2–1–1–1 format (scores in the bracket indicate the number of games won in each best-of-seven series). The team with home ice advantage plays at home for games one and two (and games five and seven, if necessary), and the other team is at home for games three and four (and game six, if necessary). The top three teams in each division make the playoffs, along with two wild cards in each conference, for a total of eight teams from each conference.

In the first round, the lower seeded wild card in each conference was played against the division winner with the best record while the other wild card was played against the other division winner, and both wild cards were de facto #4 seeds. The other series matched the second and third-place teams from the divisions. In the first two rounds, home ice advantage was awarded to the team with the better seed. In the conference finals and Stanley Cup Final, home ice advantage was awarded to the team with the better regular season record.

First round	Second round
A1	Buffalo	4
WC1	Boston	2
A1	Buffalo	3
A3	Montreal	4
A2	Tampa Bay	3
A3	Montreal	4
Eastern Conference
M1	Carolina	4
WC2	Ottawa	0
M1	Carolina	4
M3	Philadelphia	0
M2	Pittsburgh	2
M3	Philadelphia	4
C1	Colorado	4
WC2	Los Angeles	0
C1	Colorado	4
C3	Minnesota	1
C2	Dallas	2
C3	Minnesota	4
Western Conference
P1	Vegas	4
WC1	Utah	2
P1	Vegas	4
P3	Anaheim	2
P2	Edmonton	2
P3	Anaheim	4

Conference finals
A3	Montreal	1
M1	Carolina	4
C1	Colorado	0
P1	Vegas	4

Stanley Cup Final
M1	Carolina	4
P1	Vegas	2

== Statistics ==
=== Scoring leaders ===
The following players led the league in regular season points at the completion of games played on April 16, 2026.

Player	Team	GP	G	A	Pts	+/–	PIM
Connor McDavid	Edmonton Oilers	82	48	90	138	+17	44
Nikita Kucherov	Tampa Bay Lightning	76	44	86	130	+43	50
Nathan MacKinnon	Colorado Avalanche	80	53	74	127	+57	39
Macklin Celebrini	San Jose Sharks	82	45	70	115	+8	44
Mark Scheifele	Winnipeg Jets	82	36	67	103	0	43
Nick Suzuki	Montreal Canadiens	82	29	72	101	+37	28
Martin Necas	Colorado Avalanche	78	38	62	100	+47	30
David Pastrnak	Boston Bruins	77	29	71	100	+4	72
Leon Draisaitl	Edmonton Oilers	65	35	62	97	+13	26
Jason Robertson	Dallas Stars	82	45	51	96	+22	32

=== Leading goaltenders ===
The following goaltenders led the league in regular season goals against average at the completion of games played on April 16, 2026, while playing at least 1,800 minutes.

Player	Team	GP	TOI	W	L	OTL	GA	SO	SV%	GAA
Scott Wedgewood	Colorado Avalanche	45	2,549:04	31	6	6	86	4	.921	2.02
Andrei Vasilevskiy	Tampa Bay Lightning	58	3,430:45	39	15	4	132	2	.912	2.31
Daniel Vladar	Philadelphia Flyers	52	2,995:13	29	14	7	121	0	.906	2.42
Logan Thompson	Washington Capitals	58	3,445:03	31	21	6	140	4	.912	2.44
Brandon Bussi	Carolina Hurricanes	39	2,360:49	31	6	2	97	2	.895	2.47
Igor Shesterkin	New York Rangers	51	3,024:13	25	19	6	126	1	.912	2.50
Mackenzie Blackwood	Colorado Avalanche	39	2,155:41	23	10	2	90	3	.904	2.51
Ukko-Pekka Luukkonen	Buffalo Sabres	35	2,027:46	22	9	3	85	1	.910	2.52
Anton Forsberg	Los Angeles Kings	36	2,032:06	16	12	5	87	3	.910	2.57
Jake Oettinger	Dallas Stars	54	3,194:11	35	12	6	138	4	.899	2.59
Akira Schmid	Vegas Golden Knights	34	1,965:47	16	10	6	85	2	.893	2.59

== NHL awards ==
Voting concluded immediately after the end of the regular season. Statistics-based awards such as the Art Ross Trophy, Maurice "Rocket" Richard Trophy, William M. Jennings Trophy and the Presidents' Trophy are announced at the end of the regular season. The Stanley Cup and the Conn Smythe Trophy are presented at the end of the Stanley Cup Final.

Matthew Schaefer was announced as the Calder Memorial Trophy winner on the May 14 episode of Good Morning America. The winners of the other individual awards were announced during the Stanley Cup Final. The Jim Gregory General Manager of the Year Award is presented prior to the NHL entry draft.

2025–26 NHL awards
Award	Recipient(s)	Runner(s)-up/Finalists	Ref
Presidents' Trophy (best regular-season record)	Colorado Avalanche	Carolina Hurricanes	
Prince of Wales Trophy (Eastern Conference playoff champion)	Carolina Hurricanes	Montreal Canadiens	
Clarence S. Campbell Bowl (Western Conference playoff champion)	Vegas Golden Knights	Colorado Avalanche	
Art Ross Trophy (player with most points)	Connor McDavid (Edmonton Oilers)	Nikita Kucherov (Tampa Bay Lightning)	
Bill Masterton Memorial Trophy (perseverance, sportsmanship, and dedication)	Gabriel Landeskog (Colorado Avalanche)	Rasmus Dahlin (Buffalo Sabres); Jonathan Toews (Winnipeg Jets)	
Calder Memorial Trophy (best first-year player)	Matthew Schaefer (New York Islanders)	Ivan Demidov (Montreal Canadiens); Beckett Sennecke (Anaheim Ducks)	
Conn Smythe Trophy (most valuable player, playoffs)	Jordan Staal (Carolina Hurricanes)	Taylor Hall (Carolina Hurricanes)	
Frank J. Selke Trophy (best defensive forward)	Nick Suzuki (Montreal Canadiens)	Anthony Cirelli (Tampa Bay Lightning); Brock Nelson (Colorado Avalanche)	
Hart Memorial Trophy (most valuable player, regular season)	Nikita Kucherov (Tampa Bay Lightning)	Nathan MacKinnon (Colorado Avalanche); Connor McDavid (Edmonton Oilers)	
Jack Adams Award (best coach)	Jon Cooper (Tampa Bay Lightning)	Dan Muse (Pittsburgh Penguins); Lindy Ruff (Buffalo Sabres)	
James Norris Memorial Trophy (best defenseman)	Zach Werenski (Columbus Blue Jackets)	Rasmus Dahlin (Buffalo Sabres); Cale Makar (Colorado Avalanche)	
King Clancy Memorial Trophy (leadership and humanitarian contribution)	Marcus Foligno (Minnesota Wild)	N/A	
Lady Byng Memorial Trophy (sportsmanship and excellence)	Cole Caufield (Montreal Canadiens)	Anze Kopitar (Los Angeles Kings); Jake Sanderson (Ottawa Senators)	
Ted Lindsay Award (outstanding player as voted by the NHLPA)	Connor McDavid (Edmonton Oilers)	Macklin Celebrini (San Jose Sharks); Nikita Kucherov (Tampa Bay Lightning)	
Mark Messier Leadership Award (leadership and community activities)	Gabriel Landeskog (Colorado Avalanche)	N/A	
Maurice "Rocket" Richard Trophy (top goal-scorer)	Nathan MacKinnon (Colorado Avalanche)	Cole Caufield (Montreal Canadiens)	
Jim Gregory General Manager of the Year Award (best general manager)	Bill Guerin (Minnesota Wild)	Chris MacFarland (Colorado Avalanche); Pat Verbeek (Anaheim Ducks)	
Vezina Trophy (best goaltender)	Andrei Vasilevskiy (Tampa Bay Lightning)	Ilya Sorokin (New York Islanders); Jeremy Swayman (Boston Bruins)	
William M. Jennings Trophy (goaltender(s) of team with fewest goals against)	Mackenzie Blackwood and Scott Wedgewood (Colorado Avalanche)	Casey DeSmith and Jake Oettinger (Dallas Stars)	

=== All-Star teams ===
Position	First Team	Second Team	Position	All-Rookie
G	Andrei Vasilevskiy, Tampa Bay Lightning	Logan Thompson, Washington Capitals	G	Jakub Dobes, Montreal Canadiens
D	Cale Makar, Colorado Avalanche	Evan Bouchard, Edmonton Oilers	D	Alexander Nikishin, Carolina Hurricanes
D	Zach Werenski, Columbus Blue Jackets	Rasmus Dahlin, Buffalo Sabres	D	Matthew Schaefer, New York Islanders
C	Connor McDavid, Edmonton Oilers	Nathan MacKinnon, Colorado Avalanche	F	Ivan Demidov, Montreal Canadiens
RW	Nikita Kucherov, Tampa Bay Lightning	David Pastrnak, Boston Bruins	F	Beckett Sennecke, Anaheim Ducks
LW	Jason Robertson, Dallas Stars	Cole Caufield, Montreal Canadiens	F	Jimmy Snuggerud, St. Louis Blues

== Uniforms ==
=== Wholesale team changes ===
- The Boston Bruins unveiled a new logo, permanently adopting the re-designed "spoked B" logo previously used in their 2023–24 centennial season and 2024 centennial game. The team also introduced new uniforms, resembling jerseys worn by the Bruins in the 1980s and 1990s as well as the prior season's centennial game.
- The Carolina Hurricanes revealed a new road jersey, based on the jersey the team wore during the 2023 Stadium Series. The logo is recolored in black and red, with the flag of North Carolina on the left shoulder, and a "strutting Stormy" mascot logo, based on the vintage logos of the four "Tobacco Road" college teams in the area, on the right shoulder.
- The Chicago Blackhawks debuted a centennial edition uniform, which temporarily replaced their regular red home jerseys for the entire season. This uniform mostly resembled their current home jerseys, but added a lace-up collar and gold trim around the crest and back numbers, as well as the 100th anniversary patch on the right shoulder. The Blackhawks also reintoduced their alternate black jerseys, to be worn for select home games.
- The Colorado Avalanche unveiled blue Quebec Nordiques throwback uniforms as their 30th anniversary heritage jersey, paying tribute to the franchise's time in Quebec City.
- The Dallas Stars unveiled a new "'99" third jersey based on the "big star" design worn from 1997 to 2006. The jersey features the design in the team's current colors, with a black base and victory green waist and sleeve sections, as well as "3OT 1999" written in the collar, referencing the Stars' 1999 Stanley Cup Final game 6 victory in the original jerseys.
- The Detroit Red Wings unveiled a centennial edition uniform, which they wore for select home games. They feature inspirations from the previous incarnations of the team, the Detroit Cougars and the Detroit Falcons, as well as a chain-stitched crest featuring the original version of the team's "winged wheel" primary logo.
- The Edmonton Oilers revealed a new third jersey worn seven times during the season. The light-tan uniform features an all-new "Oilers" wordmark as the crest and a new "Oil Country" shoulder patch, with a blue shoulder yoke and blue and orange striping.
- The Los Angeles Kings debuted a new third jersey worn 16 times during the season. The jersey resembled the Kings' original 1967–68 uniforms, featuring the team's classic crown logo as the crest, but with a black base and silver striping replacing the original forum blue and gold.
- The Minnesota Wild re-introduced their former white jerseys, worn from their 2000–01 inaugural season through 2012–13, as a 25th anniversary uniform, but with the formerly-tan striping and sleeve numbers now gold.
- The New York Rangers debuted a centennial edition uniform, which they wore for select home games. They feature a lighter shade of blue compared to their regular jerseys and the diagonal "RANGERS" wordmark in white lettering, paying tribute to the uniforms worn by the team during their inaugural 1926–27 season.
- The Ottawa Senators released a new third jersey, their first since the 2019–20 season. The jersey is red, trimmed in black and gold on the hem and sleeves, with the Peace Tower and the flag of Canada on the back of the jersey.
- The Pittsburgh Penguins unveiled a new third jersey featuring a yellow base with black striping and their skating-penguin crest without its usual triangle. The jersey features multiple design choices referencing the city of Pittsburgh itself, with the gold base evoking previous Penguins third jerseys.
- The San Jose Sharks re-introduced their former teal uniforms, previously worn from 1998 to 2007, as their "Heritage 2.0" 35th anniversary jersey.
- The Seattle Kraken unveiled a new third jersey. The jersey is black, with sonar-inspired stripes on the sleeves and socks. The crest, stripes and Muckleshoot Tribe sponsor patch glow in the dark, referencing bioluminescence commonly found in deep sea creatures.
- The St. Louis Blues revealed a new logo and colors based on the "heritage" blue note used in the 2017 and 2022 Winter Classic games. The home uniforms resemble those worn in the 2017 game and utilized as an alternate jersey from 2018 to 2025, while the road uniforms resemble those worn in the 2022 game. The previous navy-accented blue home jersey were retained as alternates.
- The Utah Mammoth debuted their first jersey set since rebranding from the Utah Hockey Club. The home jerseys have replaced the diagonal "UTAH" wordmark with the Mammoth primary logo crest and Utah state outline shoulder patches, while the road uniforms retain the wordmark in an overhauled font and feature the Mammoth logo on the shoulders.
- The Washington Capitals revealed a new third jersey for the second consecutive season. The new red jersey, worn for 15 home games, features striping and a white yoke referencing the Capitals' original 1970s and 1980s uniforms, but with the "Screaming Eagle" crest and Capitol dome shoulder patches of the 1990s and early 2000s, as well as the previous season's 50th anniversary alternate.

=== Outdoor game uniforms ===
- The Florida Panthers and New York Rangers introduced uniforms for the 2026 Winter Classic. The Panthers' uniforms include a retro-inspired version of the "Leaping Panther" logo as a crest, while the Rangers' uniforms are a white version of their centennial edition uniforms, with the diagonal "NEW YORK" wordmark in blue lettering.
- The Boston Bruins and Tampa Bay Lightning introduced uniforms for the 2026 Stadium Series. The Bruins' uniforms feature a new bright gold base and their new bear shoulder patch as the crest, with a "BOSTON" wordmark above. The Lightning's uniforms incorporate a new sky blue color for the striping and numbers, and a diagonal "TBL" wordmark across the front.

== Milestones ==
=== First games ===
The following is a list of notable players who played their first NHL game during the 2025–26 season, listed with their first team.

Player	Team	Notability
Matthew Schaefer	New York Islanders	First overall pick in the 2025 draft, 2025–26 Calder Memorial Trophy winner, NHL All-Rookie Team selection

=== Last games ===
The following is a list of players of note who played their last NHL game in 2025–26, listed with their team:

Player	Team	Notability
Matt Dumba	Pittsburgh Penguins	King Clancy Memorial Trophy winner
Connor Ingram	Edmonton Oilers	Bill Masterton Memorial Trophy winner
Anze Kopitar	Los Angeles Kings	Over 1,500 games played, two-time Frank J. Selke Trophy winner, three-time Lady Byng Memorial Trophy winner, Mark Messier Leadership Award winner, five-time NHL All-Star, first Slovenian-born NHL player
Jonathan Quick	New York Rangers	Conn Smythe Trophy winner, two-time William M. Jennings Trophy winner, one-time NHL All-Star team selection, three-time NHL All-Star, led all American-born goalies in wins (410) at retirement
Jonathan Toews	Winnipeg Jets	Over 1,100 games played, Conn Smythe Trophy winner, Frank J. Selke Trophy winner, Mark Messier Leadership Award winner, one-time NHL All-Star Team selection, six-time NHL All-Star, 100 Greatest NHL Players, member of the Triple Gold Club

=== Major milestones reached ===
- On June 28, 2025, the Ottawa Senators selected Bruno Idzan 181st overall in the sixth round of the 2025 NHL entry draft, making him the first Croatian selected in the NHL draft.
- On October 11, 2025, Colorado Avalanche defenseman Brent Burns played his 1,500th NHL game, becoming the 23rd player to reach the mark.
- On October 18, 2025, Toronto Maple Leafs forward John Tavares became the fourth player to score 500 points with two different teams.
- On October 21, 2025, Edmonton Oilers forward Adam Henrique played his 1,000th NHL game, becoming the 409th player to reach the mark.
- On October 25, 2025, Tampa Bay Lightning forward Nikita Kucherov recorded his 1,000th point, becoming the 101st player to reach the mark.
- On October 25, 2025, Washington Capitals forward Alexander Ovechkin played his 1,500th NHL game, becoming the 24th player to reach the mark.
- On October 25, 2025, Florida Panthers goaltender Sergei Bobrovsky recorded his 50th shutout, becoming the 33rd goaltender to reach the mark.
- On October 27, 2025, Pittsburgh Penguins forward Sidney Crosby recorded his 1,700th point, becoming the ninth player to reach the mark.
- On October 29, 2025, Toronto Maple Leafs forward John Tavares scored his 500th goal, becoming the 49th player to reach the mark.
- On October 30, 2025, Dallas Stars forward Tyler Seguin played his 1,000th NHL game, becoming the 410th player to reach the mark.
- On November 5, 2025, Washington Capitals forward Alexander Ovechkin scored his 900th goal, becoming the first player in NHL history to reach the mark.
- On November 5, 2025, Calgary Flames forward Nazem Kadri played his 1,000th NHL game, becoming the 411th player to reach the mark.
- On November 9, 2025, Minnesota Wild forward Marcus Johansson played his 1,000th NHL game, becoming the 412th player to reach the mark.
- On November 13, 2025, Florida Panthers forward Brad Marchand recorded his 1,000th point, becoming the 102nd player to reach the mark.
- On November 17, 2025, Florida Panthers defenseman Jeff Petry played his 1,000th NHL game, becoming the 413th player to reach the mark.
- On November 18, 2025, St. Louis Blues defenseman Justin Faulk played his 1,000th NHL game, becoming the 414th player to reach the mark.
- On December 1, 2025, New Jersey Devils defenseman Brenden Dillon played his 1,000th NHL game, becoming the 415th player to reach the mark.
- On December 11, 2025, Carolina Hurricanes goaltender Brandon Bussi recorded his 10th win in his 11th NHL game, becoming the first goaltender in NHL history to win 10 of his first 11 games, and the fastest goaltender in NHL history to 10 career wins.
- On December 13, 2025, Winnipeg Jets forward Nino Niederreiter played his 1,000th NHL game, becoming the first Swiss-born and 416th overall player to reach the mark.
- On December 16, 2025, Edmonton Oilers forward Leon Draisaitl recorded his 1,000th point, becoming the first German-born and 103rd overall player to reach the mark.
- On December 31, 2025, Nashville Predators forward Steven Stamkos scored his 600th goal, becoming the 22nd player to reach the mark.
- On January 2, 2026, New York Rangers forward Mika Zibanejad scored a hat trick in the 2026 Winter Classic, marking the first hat trick in the history of the Winter Classic.
- On January 8, 2026, Detroit Red Wings forward Patrick Kane scored his 500th goal, becoming the 50th player to reach the mark.
- On January 10, 2026, Montreal Canadiens forward Nick Suzuki played his 500th consecutive game, becoming the 27th player to reach the mark.
- On January 18, 2026, Edmonton Oilers forward Ryan Nugent-Hopkins played his 1,000th NHL game, becoming the 417th player to reach the mark.
- On January 21, 2026, Anaheim Ducks forward Alex Killorn played his 1,000th NHL game, becoming the 418th player to reach the mark.
- On January 22, 2026, Columbus Blue Jackets forward Charlie Coyle played his 1,000th NHL game, becoming the 419th player to reach the mark.
- On January 22, 2026, Nashville Predators defenseman Roman Josi played his 1,000th NHL game, becoming the 420th player to reach the mark.
- On January 29, 2026, Detroit Red Wings forward Patrick Kane scored his 1,375th point, setting a new all-time record for points among U.S.-born players, and surpassing the record previously held by Mike Modano.
- On January 29, 2026, Buffalo Sabres forward Alex Tuch scored a hat trick, setting a league record for most hat tricks in a single month at 30. The record increased to 31 after forward Charlie Coyle of the Columbus Blue Jackets scored a hat trick on January 30.
- On March 5, 2026, Los Angeles Kings forward Anze Kopitar played his 1,500th NHL game, becoming the 25th player to reach the mark.
- On March 14, 2026, Minnesota Wild defenseman Jared Spurgeon played his 1,000th NHL game, becoming the 421st player to reach the mark.
- On March 22, 2026, Washington Capitals forward Alexander Ovechkin scored his 1,000th overall goal (combining regular season and playoffs), becoming the second player to reach the mark.
- On March 23, 2026, New York Rangers forward Mika Zibanejad played his 1,000th NHL game, becoming the 422nd player to reach the mark.
- On March 24, 2026, Seattle Kraken defenseman Adam Larsson played his 1,000th NHL game, becoming the 423rd player to reach the mark.
- On March 24, 2026, Florida Panthers head coach Paul Maurice coached his 2,000th career NHL game, becoming the second coach to reach the mark.
- On March 28, 2026, Washington Capitals forward Alexander Ovechkin played his 1,565th game, setting a new record for the most games of any career spent with one team, and surpassing the record previously held by Nicklas Lidström.
- On March 30, 2026, Vancouver Canucks forward Evander Kane played his 1,000th NHL game, becoming the 424th player to reach the mark.
- On April 2, 2026, the Los Angeles Kings lost to the Nashville Predators in a shootout for their 19th overtime/shootout loss of the year, setting a new single-season record for overtime/shootout losses, and surpassing the record previously shared by four teams.
- On April 4, 2026, Colorado Avalanche defenseman Brent Burns played his 1,000th consecutive NHL game, becoming the second player to reach the mark.
- On April 13, 2026, Colorado Avalanche forward Brock Nelson played his 1,000th NHL game, becoming the 425th player to reach the mark.
- On April 16, 2026, the Utah Mammoth lost their regular season finale 5–3 to the St. Louis Blues, officially becoming the first team since the shootout was implemented in 2005–06 to go the entire season without ever participating in a shootout.
- On April 26, 2026, Tampa Bay Lightning defenseman Ryan McDonagh played his 200th NHL playoff game, becoming the 24th player to reach the mark.
- On May 3, 2026, the Montreal Canadiens recorded only nine shots on goal in their 2–1 first round game 7 victory over the Tampa Bay Lightning, setting a new playoff record for fewest shots on goal in a win.
- On June 14, 2026, the Carolina Hurricanes won the Stanley Cup, making head coach Rod Brind'Amour the fourth individual in NHL history to win the Stanley Cup with the same franchise as both the captain and head coach, and the first to do so in the expansion era.
- On June 14, 2026, Carolina Hurricanes forward Jordan Staal was awarded the Conn Smythe Trophy as the most valuable player of the 2026 Stanley Cup playoffs, becoming the oldest Conn Smythe winner in NHL history (37 years, 277 days), and surpassing the record previously set by Tim Thomas in 2011.

== Media rights ==
=== National ===
==== Canada ====
This was the 12th and final season of the Canadian national broadcast rights deal with Sportsnet, before a new 12-year contract begins in 2026–27. The original deal expiring this 2025–26 season included Sportsnet's sub-licensing agreements to air Saturday Hockey Night in Canada games on CBC Television, French-language broadcasts on TVA Sports, and the final year of Amazon Prime Video's two-year streaming deal.

This ended up being the 74th and final year of CBC's relationship with the league. After the season, CBC announced that it would no longer sub-license NHL coverage. CBC also maintained ownership of the Hockey Night in Canada brand, stating that it would use the brand in "different ways".

Linear television

- Saturday Hockey Night in Canada games aired across CBC, one or more of the four Sportsnet feeds, Sportsnet One, Sportsnet 360, and Citytv. Decisions on network assignments were made on a week-by-week basis, and select games simulcast on multiple networks.
- Sportsnet also exclusively aired Wednesday Night Hockey, the Winter Classic, Stadium Series, and All-Star Game.
- TVA Sports' schedule included Saturday La super soirée LNH (lit. 'NHL Super Evening') games, as well as French-language broadcasts of the Winter Classic, Stadium Series, All-Star Game, among others.

Streaming

- Sportsnet+ streamed games depending on the tier, with national games available on the Standard level, out-of-market games on the Premium tier, and via authenticated streaming on participating teams.
- Amazon Prime Video streamed Monday Night Hockey.

==== United States ====
This was the fifth season of the league's seven-year U.S. national broadcast rights deals with the ESPN family of networks and TNT Sports. A total of 16 more national games aired on linear channels this season. ESPN continued to produce 100 games, but three more was on its linear channels versus being exclusively streamed. TNT had 13 more games this season, hitting the maximum 72 allowed per season in its contract for the first time. These time slots opened up after changes to both networks' rights to the NBA (with ESPN having a reduced schedule under its new NBA contract, and TNT having lost its rights to that league entirely), as well changes to ESPN's Major League Baseball contract.

Linear television

- ESPN continued to have the opening day tripleheader, and produce ABC's Hockey Saturday on ten select afternoon or night games this season between January 3 and April 11. ESPN was now free to schedule other games on any day of the week except during NBA Wednesday games, with Thursday being the most common day. ESPN's schedule included Sunday night games on three select weekends in February and March (in place of NBA Sunday games), and on April 5 (in place of Sunday Night Baseball). ESPN also had the Stadium Series. An alternate broadcast of the April 5 Washington Capitals–New York Rangers game aired on Disney Channel and Disney XD as Inside Out Classic, using the league's player and puck tracking system to render a live animated version of the game portrayed by Inside Out characters.
- TNT continued to primarily carry Wednesday night games throughout the regular season, the Thanksgiving Showdown, the Winter Classic, and Sunday games on five select weekends between March 1 and April 12. With its loss of rights to the NBA, TNT's NHL schedule expanded to 13 select Tuesdays to occupy what was the NBA on TNT's flagship window (including a tripleheader on December 23 to precede the Christmas break), a Thursday game on October 30, and a doubleheader on Martin Luther King Jr. Day (counterprogramming the NBA's traditional slate of games on that day). Not all of TNT Sports' regular season games were exclusive broadcasts and were thus subject to blackout in local markets.

Streaming

- ESPN's new direct-to-consumer streaming service, ESPN DTC, streamed games depending on the tier. ESPN+ was integrated into ESPN DTC's "Select" plan, including the NHL Power Play on ESPN+ out-of-market package. ESPN+ and Hulu also continued to have exclusive games on select days throughout the season, mostly on Tuesdays and Thursdays. The Inside Out Classic alternative broadcast was on both ESPN+ and Disney+. The live streaming of ESPN's linear games (on the ESPN cable channel and ABC) was on ESPN DTC's higher "Unlimited" plan before their on-demand replays awere made available on ESPN+.
- HBO Max's ad-free tiers streamed all TNT Sports-produced games.

==== Radio ====
This was the third season of the league's six-year deal with SiriusXM and SiriusXM Canada to simulcast all 32 teams' local regular season and postseason broadcasts.

=== Local ===
- The Tampa Bay Lightning announced an agreement with Scripps Sports to replace FanDuel Sports Network Sun as the team's local broadcast partner. WXPX-TV will serve as the flagship station for Lightning games. A DTC streaming option will also be available.
- The Dallas Stars, whose local rights are held by the FAST streaming service Victory+, announced an expanded agreement with Fox Television Stations and Gray Media to simulcast 17 games on over-the-air stations in Texas, Arkansas and Louisiana.
- In January, the Wild announced an agreement with Hubbard Broadcasting and Gray Media to simulcast four games on over-the-air networks across Minnesota, Iowa, North Dakota, South Dakota and Wisconsin. The games will be the first time since 2010-11 that the Wild have aired local games over-the-air.

FanDuel Sports Network teams

In December 2025, the Wall Street Journal reported that DAZN was in advanced talks to acquire a majority stake in Main Street Sports Group, the owner of the FanDuel Sports Networks. If the deal goes through, DAZN and Main Street would integrate their live streaming platform in the United States and collaborate on programming. Afterwards, Sports Business Journal reported that Main Street had missed a payment to the St. Louis Cardinals baseball team and that the company would be forced to dissolve operations at the end of the 2025–26 season if the deal with DAZN did not go through by the end of January 2026. In January, Sports Business Journal reported that Main Street had missed payments to "several, if not all 13" of its NBA teams. As a result, Main Street and the teams with missed payments entered a 15-day grace period. Two days later, Sports Business Journal reported that talks with DAZN had stopped progressing and all MLB teams except the Tampa Bay Rays had not received payments on-time.

On January 8, 2026, all nine MLB teams with agreements with FanDuel Sports Network terminated their contracts with the company due to missed payments. In February 2026 it was reported, and later confirmed, that most of the impacted teams would move their production and distribution to MLB Local Media, but that the Los Angeles Angels and Atlanta Braves were considering in-house operations that could include potentially include team-owned RSNs. Puck reported that Main Street intends to wind down FanDuel Sports Network in mid-April after the close of the 2025–26 NBA and NHL seasons.

Personnel

- The New York Rangers promoted the radio broadcast team of Kenny Albert (play-by-play) and Dave Maloney (color commentator) to replace Sam Rosen and Joe Micheletti in the television booth. Alex Faust and Dave Starman were then brought in to replace Albert and Maloney, with Faust serving as Albert's backup on television during the latter's national TV assignments.
- The New York Islanders fired long-time radio announcers Chris King and Greg Picker. King had served as the radio play-by-play man since the 1998–99 season, with Picker becoming a radio analyst ahead of the 2013–14 season. The Islanders later announced that Alan Fuehring will take over on radio play-by-play with Josh Bailey as analyst. Additionally, Thomas Hickey will now serve as the primary television analyst with Butch Goring moving to a backup role.
- Toronto Maple Leafs announcer Joe Bowen announced his impending retirement after the season. Bowen began calling Maple Leafs games in the 1982–83 season mainly on radio, though he also called regional games on television from 1989 to 1995, and from 1998 to 2014.
- The New Jersey Devils hired Don La Greca as its new television play-by-play announcer, replacing Bill Spaulding. La Greca was previously the backup radio play-by-play announcer of the New York Rangers.
- The St. Louis Blues did not renew the contract of television play-by-play announcer John Kelly, ending his 20-year run with the team. The Blues then announced that they will employ a radio and TV simulcast of their games, with Chris Kerber and Joe Vitale serving as game announcers, and TV color commentator Jamie Rivers returning to his previous role as studio analyst. The Blues joined the Buffalo Sabres, Carolina Hurricanes, and Dallas Stars as the only teams to employ a radio and TV simulcast.
- The Los Angeles Kings will once again employ separate radio and TV broadcast crews, hiring former Blues announcer John Kelly as its new television play-by-play announcer to replace Nick Nickson. Additionally, the team brought in Ray Ferraro, Tony Granato and Jarret Stoll to rotate with Jim Fox in the TV color analyst role, and Josh Schaefer will serve as Kelly's backup while also serving as the lead radio play-by-play announcer. Kelly was also hired by ESPN to call select nationally televised NHL games for ESPN and ESPN+.
- Anaheim Ducks radio announcer Steve Carroll announced his impending retirement after the season. Carroll has called games for the Ducks on radio starting with the 1998–99 season, and also worked with the Philadelphia Flyers radio team during their 1995–96 season.

=== International ===
- On July 30, 2025, the NHL announced a global digital rights deal with DAZN, which will see its international streaming service NHL.TV move to DAZN as part of or as an add-on subscription in around 200 countries. The agreement succeeds a previous streaming partnership the NHL had with Sportradar.
- For the eighth consecutive season, the NHL Saturday and NHL Sunday package of regular season games will air across selected European broadcasters.
- This was the final season of a five-year deal with Viaplay to stream games in Sweden, Finland, Norway, Denmark and Iceland.
- ESPN will additionally air its slate of games in Latin America, Brazil, the Caribbean, sub-Saharan Africa, Oceania and the Netherlands, and will air games through Disney+ in select markets in Asia and Europe.
- Sky Sports will air selected games in the United Kingdom, Austria, Germany, Italy, Liechtenstein, Luxembourg, and San Marino.
- Australia's Nine Network acquired a package of weekly regular season games beginning on October 18, airing on 9Go! and streaming on 9Now. The package is drawn from Friday night games, which air locally in a Saturday morning timeslot, and feature a dedicated broadcast feed tailored to the local audience. The package was meant to lead towards Nine's coverage of the 2026 Winter Olympics, and marked the first time the NHL had been broadcast on free-to-air television in Australia.
- In January 2026, ITV Sport acquired a package of weekly regular season games in the United Kingdom for the remainder of the season, airing on ITV4 and streaming on ITVX.

== See also ==
- 2025–26 NHL transactions
- 2025–26 NHL suspensions and fines
- List of 2025–26 NHL Three Star Awards
- 2025 in sports
- 2026 in sports
- 2026 in ice hockey
