= Deb Placey =

American news anchor

Deborah Kaufman Placey (born March 17, 1966) is an American sportscaster who currently co-hosts the television program, NHL Live, with EJ Hradek on the NHL Network, as well as The BlackBerry All-Access Pregame show on NHL.com. On September 6, 2018, MSG Network announced Placey was leaving the regional sports network to take a new on-air position with the NHL Network.

Placey had previously served as a news anchor/reporter for the New Jersey Devils' televised games on MSG Plus and the MSG Network. Placey joined the New Jersey Devils in 2011 after 10 seasons as pre-game and intermission host for New York Islanders telecasts. Placey's earlier TV anchor work includes stops at WSIL-TV in Carterville, Illinois, KWWL-TV in Waterloo, Iowa, WPRI-TV in Providence, Rhode Island and WSVN-TV in Miami, Florida.

Prior to joining MSG in the mid-1990s, Placey regularly appeared on ESPN2 at the time of ESPN2's infancy (October 1993) through mid-1995. She appeared on the debut ESPN2 SportsNight broadcast with Keith Olberman, providing news from the "SportSmash update desk." From 2004 through 2005, Placey worked as a fill-in weekend sports anchor and reporter for WNBC-TV, the flagship NBC affiliate.

In 1997, during her time at MSG, Howard Z. Unger, writing in The Village Voice, described her as "soothingly pragmatic" compared to co-host Bob Page, who "takes a little getting used to."

Born and raised in St. Louis, Missouri, Deb Placey is married to Edward Placey, a senior coordinating producer at ESPN. The Placeys have two daughters, Madeline and Caroline, and a beagle named Lucky.
