= List of Brooklyn Nets broadcasters =

This article is a list of broadcasters for the National Basketball Association (NBA)'s Brooklyn Nets franchise.

== Television ==
=== Play by Play ===
- Marty Glickman (1970–1972)
- Steve Albert (1972–1990)
- Leandra Reilly (February 14 and March 2, 1988, Alternate Play by Play for Steve Albert)
- Spencer Ross (1990–1995)
- Ian Eagle (Primary 1995–2005, Secondary 2005–2011, 2011–Present,)
- Mike Crispino (Secondary 1995–2005)
- Matt Loughlin (Secondary 1995–2005)
- Marv Albert (2005–2011)
- Noah Eagle (Secondary 2023–Present)
- Ryan Ruocco (Secondary 2011–Present)

=== Color Analyst ===
- Bob Gibson (1970–1972)
- Mike DiTomasso (1972–1981)
- Phil Jackson (1981–1982)
- Bill Raftery (Primary 1982–2002)
- Bob Goldsholl (Secondary 1982–1987)
- Jim Spanarkel (Secondary 1987–2002, Secondary 2005–2019)
- Kelly Tripucka (2002–2005)
- Mark Jackson (2005–2008)
- Mike Fratello (2008–2017)
- Greg Anthony (Tertiary 2012–2013)
- Donny Marshall (Tertiary 2013–2016)
- Sarah Kustok (Tertiary 2015–2017, Primary 2017–Present)
- Richard Jefferson (Secondary 2019–Present)

=== Broadcast Outlets ===
==== Terrestrial ====
- WWOR-TV (1972–1985 and 1989–1994 )
- WBIS-TV (1996–1997)

==== Cable ====
- Cablevision Sports 3/SportsChannel/Fox Sports (Net) New York (1976–2002)
- YES Network (2002–Present)

== Radio ==
=== Play by Play ===
- Marty Glickman (1970–1972)
- Al Albert (1972–1974)
- Dom Valentino (1974–1975)
- John Sterling (1975–1981)
- Joe Tait (1981–1982)
- Mike Zimet (1982–1983)
- Mel Proctor (1983–1985)
- Neil Funk (1985–1987)
- Howard David (1987–1994)
- Ian Eagle (1994–1995)
- Steve Albert (1995–1996)
- Bob Papa (1996–2001)
- Chris Carrino (2001–Present)
- Craig Carton (March 8, 2013)

=== Color Analyst ===
- Bob Gibson (1970–1972)
- Mike DiTomasso (1972–1987)
- Jim Spanarkel (primary 1987–1993)
- Tim Bassett (secondary 1987–1988)
- Mike O'Koren (secondary 1988–1993, 1993–1999)
- Albert King (1999–2001)
- Kelly Tripucka (2001–2002)
- Tim Capstraw (2002–Present)
- Boomer Esiason (March 8, 2013)

=== Flagship Station ===
- WJRZ (1967–1968)
- WGBB (1968–1970)
- WGBB (1968–1970)
- WGBB and WGLI (1970–1971)
- WHN (1971–1974)
- WMCA (1974–1978)
- WVNJ (1978–1980)
- WWRL (1980–1982)
- WVNJ (1982–1983)
- WNBC (1983–1986)
- WNEW (1986–1992)
- WPAT and WEVD (1992–1994)
- WQEW (1994–1997)
- WOR (1997–2004)
- WFAN (2004–Present)

== See also ==
- List of current NBA broadcasters

== Notes ==
- When Leandra Reilly called a 1988 game on SportsChannel New York, she became the first woman to do play-by-play of an NBA game.
- On March 8, 2013, Craig Carton and Boomer Esiason, the morning hosts on the Nets' radio flagship station, WFAN, worked as the play-by-play announcer and color commentator, respectively, for the Nets' contest against the Washington Wizards at Barclays Center.
