= MSG Network =

Regional sports network

- Type: Regional sports network
- Country: United States
- Broadcast area: New York; Northern & Central New Jersey; Southwestern Connecticut; Northeastern Pennsylvania; Nationwide (via satellite)
- Headquarters: Pennsylvania Plaza, New York, NY 10001

Programming
- Languages: English; Spanish (via SAP)
- Picture format: 1080i (HDTV); 480i (SDTV)

Ownership
- Owner: Sphere Entertainment
- Parent: MSG Networks, Inc.
- Key people: James L. Dolan (chairman & CEO)
- Sister channels: MSG Sportsnet; MSG Western New York

History
- Launched: October 15, 1969; 57 years ago
- Founder: Charles Dolan

Links
- Website: www.msgnetworks.com

Availability

Streaming media
- MSG+ on DAZN: www.dazn.com/en-US/welcome/msgplusyes (Requires a DAZN account or existing Gotham Sports account, and a login from participating providers or a subscription to stream content)
- DirecTV Stream: 634
- FuboTV: Available within designated area

The MSG Network (MSG) is an American regional cable and satellite television network, and radio service owned by Sphere Entertainment—a spin-off of the main Madison Square Garden Company operation (itself a spin-off of local cable provider Cablevision)—which are all controlled by the family of Charles Dolan.

Primarily serving the Mid-Atlantic United States, its programming focuses on events featuring and other programs about New York City sports teams, including live game broadcasts of the New York Knicks of the National Basketball Association, the New York Rangers, New York Islanders, Buffalo Sabres, and New Jersey Devils of the National Hockey League and Gotham FC of the National Women's Soccer League. The channel is named after the Madison Square Garden sports and entertainment venue in Midtown Manhattan, home of the Knicks and Rangers.

== History ==
What would become MSG debuted on October 15, 1969, with an NHL hockey game between the New York Rangers and the Minnesota North Stars. As a result, it became the first regional sports network in North America, and one of the first of its kind in the world. The channel, which at the time did not even have a name, was carried by Manhattan Cable Television under a one-year, 125-event deal that was signed in May 1969. At the time, the cable provider, which had televised New York Knicks and Rangers post-season games the previous spring for a $25,000 rights fee, had only 13,000 subscribers. (The channel's coverage of the deciding game of the 1970 NBA Finals, in which the Knicks beat the Los Angeles Lakers, was the only live broadcast of the game shown in New York City; WABC-TV blacked out ABC's telecast.) Madison Square Garden renewed the deal with what was now Sterling Manhattan Cable Television in the fall of 1970, in a five-year deal at an estimated rights fee of $1–1.5 million. Charles Dolan, who later headed MSG and Cablevision, was the president of Sterling Manhattan at the time. Games held at Madison Square Garden later appeared on another of Sterling Manhattan Cable's ventures, premium cable network Home Box Office (HBO) during the network's early years.

In the meantime, an unrelated channel was launched on September 22, 1977, as a joint-venture of UA-Columbia Cablevision and the Madison Square Garden Corporation, and would brand itself the "Madison Square Garden Sports Network" in 1978 before the Sterling Manhattan Cable channel could use the name. The competitor would change its name in 1980 to the USA Network.

In 1977, the Madison Square Garden Corp, which included its namesake sports arena was sold to Gulf+Western. Around the same time, a separate network was created by the Madison Square Garden Corp. to distribute 125 events to New York-area cable systems. These events were in addition to the 250 already being produced for the national distribution. It was this network which became known as Madison Square Garden Television that would evolve into the current MSG Network.

On April 9, 1980, the channel began using both the full name "Madison Square Garden Network" and its new abbreviated form "MSG Network". By August 1983, Barry Diller, who as head of prominent Gulf+Western division Paramount Pictures became the main shareholder in the USA Network when Gulf+Western transferred the network to Paramount in 1981, would increase the USA Network's relationship with the Madison Square Garden Network through a deal which included making the USA Network a source for MSG events. In December 1988, MSG Network became the first cable network to secure all local television rights to a Major League Baseball team's game, signing a 12-year deal with the New York Yankees that would give it exclusive rights to 150 games per season from 1991 through 2000. Sources placed the value of the agreement at approximately $500 million. By the early 1990s, the channel would affiliate with Prime Network. In 1994, Paramount Communications was acquired by Viacom (itself a cable giant, having once owned various cable systems in the U.S. under the Viacom Cablevision banner and also owner of MTV Networks), which in turn sold the MSG properties to Cablevision and ITT Corporation, which each held a 50% ownership stake; ITT would sell its share to Cablevision three years later.

On October 5, 2006, MSG underwent an extensive rebrand with the introduction of a new logo and graphics package, and the removal of the word "Network" from the channel's promotions. The new logo was designed by Jennifer Little for PMCD design. Since the rebrand, the channel has incorporated more entertainment-oriented programming, including concerts and professional boxing and wrestling cards that have taken place at Madison Square Garden or Radio City Music Hall (both operated by MSG Entertainment). (Full length broadcasts of Madison Square Garden WWWF/WWF wrestling shows had already been previously screened by the MSG Network since the 1970s.) In February 2010, Cablevision spun off MSG Network, the Madison Square Garden venue and other related properties into The Madison Square Garden Company.

In September 2015, the MSG Networks division was spun out into a separate company, with The Madison Square Garden Company maintaining ownership of the venue and related properties. The company was split further in April 2020, with the sports properties operating as Madison Square Garden Sports Corp., and the venue and entertainment properties spun out as the publicly traded Madison Square Garden Entertainment.

On March 26, 2021, MSG Entertainment announced that it would acquire MSG Networks in an all-stock deal; the company stated that the purchase was part of an effort "to grow the company beyond its established collection of assets into one that is pioneering the next generation of entertainment." The acquisition was completed in July 2021. In April 2023, MSG Entertainment subsequently spun off its theatre and live events businesses under the MSG Entertainment name, with the remainder of the company renamed Sphere Entertainment (after an eponymous live events venue in Las Vegas).

Facing an environment where its core leagues, the NHL and NBA, were increasingly diverting their game inventory to national broadcast and multichannel partners, MSG representatives stated that the actions jeopardized their ability to deliver the required number of games on the MSG networks to providers and subscribers under their retransmission agreements, reducing the fees they could collect from providers. This, along with the broader trend of cord-cutting and the similar declines of other regional sports network groups, placed MSG Networks at risk of bankruptcy by the end of March 2025.

== Programming ==
Among other teams, it has long produced radio and television broadcasts of the NBA's New York Knicks, the NHL's New York Rangers and (until 2018) the WNBA's New York Liberty, which play their home games at the Garden. Upon its launch in 2014, MSG also became the television home of the Westchester Knicks, the New York Knicks' farm club in the NBA G League. Since 2013, MSG has also aired games from the Hartford Wolf Pack, the New York Rangers' farm club in the AHL.

MSG also holds television rights to the NASL's New York Cosmos since 2017. In 2010, MSG began broadcasting exclusive content from the NFL's New York Giants. Buffalo Bills content was added in 2016.

MSG also owns the television rights to the NHL's Buffalo Sabres, New Jersey Devils, New York Islanders and the AHL's Bridgeport Islanders and Rochester Americans. Islanders, Devils and (AHL Islanders) games air on MSG Sportsnet, while Sabres and Americans games air on MSG Western New York in Western New York and are split between MSG and MSG Sportsnet in the rest of upstate New York.

The network also broadcast nightly highlights of races held at tracks sanctioned by the New York Racing Association, as well as a weekly magazine show; live races (normally graded stakes races) also air on select Saturday afternoons. MSG Network broadcasts soccer events from the Premier League (since 2002, consisting of game rebroadcasts from Fox Soccer and later Fox Soccer Plus and a weekly highlight program) and the UEFA Champions League (since 2009, with a live game each Tuesday of competition, produced by Fox Soccer Plus, with a second game originally aired on Fox Soccer Plus also rebroadcast on MSG or MSG Sportsnet).

It also runs extended highlights from concerts held at MSG or other venues owned by the Dolan family through MSG Entertainment, along with other shows focused on New York musicians – which are frequently used as filler programming in blackout zones; as well as movies – generally sports-related, in addition to some Hollywood blockbusters and several New York sports-related fiction or documentary programs that were originally broadcast on ESPN, which are most commonly seen during the summer NHL and NBA offseason.

During the period of time in which sister station MSG Sportsnet was a primary affiliate of Fox Sports Net (now known as Bally Sports as of 2021), MSG also acted as a secondary FSN affiliate, airing Fox Sports-produced programming in certain timeslots (such as the National Sports Report) and contributing footage to FSN shows. This ceased when the FSN branding was removed and FSN New York became MSG Plus (now MSG Sportsnet), and FSN programming has since been split between MSG Sportsnet and the YES Network (as Fox took a stake in YES in 2012).

MSG began carrying local broadcasts of Gotham FC matches in 2023 before expanding the broadcast rights partnership in 2024.

=== Collegiate sports ===
MSG airs locally produced athletic events from Hofstra University and Fordham University. MSG also airs the Kwik Trip Holiday Face-Off college hockey tournament through its affiliation with Bally Sports.

MSG and MSG Sportsnet previously broadcast basketball games from the Metro Atlantic Athletic, Northeast, America East and Atlantic Coast Conferences; football games from the Southeastern Conference; and football and basketball games from the Pac-10 and Big 12 Conferences (with basketball games from the latter exclusive to women's teams). The Pac-10, Big 12 and ACC telecasts were carried though Fox Sports Networks (which maintained national broadcast rights to all three conferences), while the other games were either produced by the conferences themselves or through ESPN Plus.

MSG formerly carried games from the Big East Conference, along with the coaches shows for Rutgers and St. John's University. In July 2008, the Big East and SportsNet New York announced a multi-year deal which gave SNY exclusive regional rights to Big East coaches shows and ESPN Plus-produced games. However, MSG retained rights to a reduced schedule of Big East games, including any St. John's basketball games played at Madison Square Garden.

=== Original programming ===
==== MSG, NY ====
MSG, NY, a daily sports highlights and entertainment program which served as the network's flagship program, debuted in October 2006. Aired numerous times during the day, the program originated as the sports-focused MSG Sportsdesk similar to ESPN's SportsCenter, until a format change that occurred as part of MSG's 2006 rebranding and reformatting in which sporting events remain the primary focus while a secondary focus was placed on all events at Madison Square Garden.

Anchors included Jason Horowitz, Deb Placey, Tina Cervasio, Al Trautwig, Greg Gumbel, Marv Albert, Jonathan Coachman, and Bill Daughtry.

The show however, gave expanded coverage to area sports teams that the channel holds game telecast rights; other New York City area teams were covered on the program, usually to a lesser extent. Along with coverage of Garden-related entertainment news, this was intended to prevent direct competition with SportsNite on SportsNet New York. MSG, NY was taped inside a street-level studio, with a window overlooking Madison Square Garden across the street. The program originally aired as a half-hour broadcast on Tuesday through Saturdays (with no editions on Sundays and Mondays, possibly as they were considered "low-viewership nights"), at about 10 or 10:30 p.m. Eastern time, with the exact time dependent on sports events schedules, before expanding to an hour-long nightly broadcast in 2008, based on improved ratings over its predecessor Sportsdesk. The studio is also used by SiTV Media Fuse. The show was cancelled in January 2009, due to declining ratings; in its place, MSG usually offers team-specific post-game shows.

==== Pro Wrestling ====
Besides airing Knicks, Rangers and Yankees games MSG also aired pro wrestling programs such as:

- WWE events from MSG (1976–1992, 1997)
- WWF Wrestling Spotlight (1989–1995)
- World Class Championship Wrestling (1986–1989)
- Ladies Pro Wrestling Association (1989–1991)
- ECW Hardcore TV (January 6, 1995 – December 31, 2000)
- WCW Prime (1995–1997)

==== Archival programs ====
- The 50 Greatest Moments at Madison Square Garden – debuted in October 2006, the program looks at the historic sports and non-sports-related events that have been held at Madison Square Garden.
- MSG Originals – a series of programs expanding on 50 Greatest Moments to further discuss the history of Madison Square Garden, that debuted in 2007. Topics include Mecca of Boxing and Spring of 1994.
- MSG Vault – a series that debuted in 2006, featuring classic Knicks and Rangers games (among other events held at the Garden) from previous decades. In some cases, MSG no longer has complete tapes of the games, and so the content often consists of highlights; more recent episodes have seen Rangers and Knicks related content not originally produced by the channel. In launching MSG Vault, MSG indicated that it has over 90,000 tapes of Garden events in its archive. Some tapes prior to the 1990s are incomplete (parts of events may have been taped over or erased). Hosted by Al Trautwig, "The Vault" remains one of MSG's most popular programs, with a cult-like following of viewers from all ages. Trautwig, usually with a guest related to the theme of the program, often describes how the footage was found and other interesting info. Buffalo Sabres archival content is occasionally broadcast, but is shown as a separate program, generally hosted by Kevin Sylvester.
- WWE MSG Classics – debuted in 2006, it airs WWE Classic matches that have been held at Madison Square Garden, hosted by "Mean Gene" Okerlund.
- TXT MSG – a series highlighting classic sports events from MSG's library that debuted in 2010, which are reviewed in the style of Pop Up Video.
- 30 for 30 – Reruns of the ESPN Films series.

==== Basketball ====
- Inside the Knicks – a weekly Knicks magazine show that debuted in 2005.
- SummerBall – debuted in 2006, a series that highlights the major summer basketball leagues in New York City, featuring Hoops in the Sun at Orchard Beach, Dyckman and the Uptowners Basketball League, and especially the EBC at Rucker Park; hosted by Michael Bivins.
- Friday Night Knicks – special Friday night New York Knicks games.

==== Football ====
- Giants Opening Drive Live – a preview show hosted by Harry Carson and Anita Marks.
- Giants Game Day – a pregame show hosted by Bob Papa.
- Giants Chronicles – a 30-minute taped program that offers an in-depth look at the career of a Giants legend, hosted by Bob Papa.
- Coach's Press Conference – a weekly press conference with the Giants head coach.

==== Hockey ====
- Inside the Rangers – a weekly Rangers magazine show that debuted in 2006.
- Islanders Illustrated – a monthly Islanders magazine show (2008–2009)
- Hockey Night Live! – a week-in-review show focusing on the Rangers; Islanders; Devils and Sabres that debuted in 2005 as Hockey Night New York Live, and was renamed in 2007, airing on Saturday nights during the NHL season. Al Trautwig is the primary host, with Ron Duguay, Mike Keenan, Stan Fischler, Dave Maloney, Ken Daneyko, Butch Goring, Steve Valiquette, Henrik Lundqvist, and John MacLean among the analysts.
- Beyond Blue & Gold — a periodical Sabres magazine show that debuted in 2013

==== High school sports ====
- High School Weekly – one of MSG's longest-running shows, focuses on high school football and basketball games from around the region, hosted by Mike Quick. Many NFL, NBA and WNBA athletes have appeared on the show during their high school days.
- High School Game of the Week – a weekly tape delayed broadcast of a high school football, basketball or lacrosse game from various parts of the New York City metropolitan area; the games typically feature schools from the suburbs (where MSG's sister company and former parent, Cablevision, serves as the dominant cable provider), or private schools in New York City proper. Selected games air live, such as the annual PSAL basketball championship at MSG, and occasional holiday football or basketball rivalry games. MSG Western New York also carries a high school game of the week, under its own brand High School Coverage focusing solely on the Monsignor Martin Athletic Association.
- The LAX Report – a local high school lacrosse show similar to High School Weekly that debuted in 2006, and is hosted by Mike Quick.

==== Online programming ====
MSG's website, MSGNetworks.com, has offered exclusive podcast programming since 2006. These include:

- This Week in Hockey – debuted in 2006, features guests from around the NHL and from MSG Networks, including Stan Fischler, Joe Micheletti, and a fantasy hockey perspective provided by the RinkRat.
- Batt'r Up! – debuted in 2006, is a weekly baseball podcast hosted by Matt Loughlin and longtime baseball analyst Fran Healy, with guests from around Major League Baseball, and fantasy advice from The Knuckler. New York Post columnist and MSG baseball analyst Joel Sherman also contributes to the program.
- CenterCourt – debuted in 2006, is an all-basketball podcast hosted by Gus Johnson and featuring John Andariese and Walt "Clyde" Frazier. Johnson recaps NBA news and offers fantasy advice, while Frazier answers fan emails in a segment called "Dishin and Swishin" and Andariese tells basketball stories in the segment "Tall Tales". David Dominik hosts the "Three-Point Play" segment and conducts the "One-on-One" interviews with major NBA players.

==== Talk shows ====
- Halls of Fame – hosted by Fran Healy, the program features interviews with famous players and coaches from a variety of sports.
- The Game 365 (beginning in 2017 the show was renamed Focused) – hosted by Fran Healy, the program features profiles and interviews of players and coaches with the backdrop of following each episode's guest around for a day in his/her athletic environment.
- Hahn, Humpty & Canty – an in-studio simulcast of the midday radio show from New York City sports talk station WEPN-FM (98.7), hosted by Alan Hahn, Rick DiPietro and Chris Canty.
- 4 Courses – a general entertainment, half-hour talk show hosted by J. B. Smoove.
- The Mask – a general entertainment, half-hour talk show hosted by Henrik Lundqvist.
- People Talking Sports* (*and Other Stuff) — a general entertainment, half-hour late-night talk show hosted by Brandon 'Scoop B' Robinson.
- Follow the Money - Talk show carried on tape delay from Brent Musburger's Vegas Stats & Information Network.
- The MSG 150 - 150-minute news and discussion program.

=== Former original programming ===
- Boomer and Carton in the Morning – an in-studio simulcast of the morning radio show from New York City sports talk station WFAN (660 AM). The show later moved to CBS Sports Network.
- Play It Up! – a children's show that aired on Saturday mornings from the 1998–99 to 2002–03 seasons. Hosted by Lisa Mollick and Howie Ravikoff, each episode featured interviews, skill demonstrations, tips and trivia from members of the New York Knicks, New York Rangers, New York Liberty and later, New York Mets, New York MetroStars and New York Power. Play It Up! was nominated for two New York Emmy Awards for the 1998–99 and 2001–02 television seasons.

=== Former sports rights ===
==== New York Yankees (1989–2001) ====
From 1989 to 2001, the channel held cable television rights to the New York Yankees Major League Baseball franchise. MSG paid an average of $55 million a year for the broadcast rights, a deal that is widely credited with starting a national trend towards greater team coverage on regional sports networks, with more games being broadcast than the programming schedules of broadcast television stations could usually permit due to other programming commitments. MSG also produced radio broadcasts of Yankees games from 1994 to 2001, which aired on WABC (770 AM). MSG also held the over-the-air broadcast rights to Yankee games, which it sold to longtime broadcaster, independent station (later a WB affiliate) WPIX channel 11 from 1989 to 1998 and Fox owned-and-operated station WNYW (channel 5) from 1999 to 2001. In 2002, the Yankees terminated their agreement with MSG to form its own regional sports network, YES Network.

==== New York Mets (2002–2005) ====
From 2002 to 2005, MSG held rights to Tuesday and Wednesday night games from the New York Mets, obtaining the rights from Fox Sports Net New York (MSG, Fox Sports New York and WPIX each carried about 50 games a season on consistent days of the week). Like the Yankees deal, MSG also maintained broadcast television rights, placing games on WWOR-TV (channel 9) before the games moved to WPIX in 1999.

For the 2005 season, Mets games moved to SportsNet New York, a regional sports network co-owned by the team and several cable providers (later Comcast and Spectrum), which provide cable service to areas not served by Cablevision in New York City metropolitan area – and in Spectrum's case, most of upstate New York. WPIX retained rights to a reduced slate of games.

==== New York Red Bulls/MetroStars ====
MSG has broadcast New York Red Bulls matches from its inception in 1996, when the team was known as the New York/New Jersey MetroStars. The network also signed multi-year deals in 2011 and in 2014.

The network lost its rights to the New York Red Bulls matches in 2022 after Major League Soccer signed a 10-year broadcast deal to air all matches of MLS on Apple TV+ through the MLS Season Pass.

== On-air staff ==
=== Basketball ===
- Mike Breen – Knicks play-by-play announcer
- Kenny Albert – Knicks alternate play-by-play announcer
- Walt Frazier – Knicks game color analyst
- Alan Hahn – Knicks studio host, alternate color analyst, sideline reporter
- Wally Szczerbiak – Knicks studio analyst, alternate color analyst
- Gus Johnson - Knicks alternate play-by-play announcer
- Jamal Crawford - Knicks alternate color analyst
- Ed Cohen – Liberty play-by-play announcer
- Tyler Murray - Knicks radio play-by-play announcer
- Monica McNutt - Knicks radio color analyst, alternate TV color analyst
- Julianne Viani – Liberty game color analyst

=== Hockey ===
==== Rangers ====
- Kenny Albert – Rangers play-by-play announcer
- Alex Faust – Rangers fill-in TV play-by-play announcer
- Dave Maloney – Rangers color analyst
- John Giannone – Rangers rinkside reporter and fill-in play-by-play announcer
- Bill Pidto – Studio host for Rangers and Knicks road games, fill-in play-by-play announcer for Knicks games
- Steve Valiquette – Rangers studio analyst
- Henrik Lundqvist – Rangers studio analyst
- Michelle Gingras – Rangers intermission/Locker room reporter (Home games)

==== Devils ====
- Don La Greca – Devils play-by-play announcer
- Ken Daneyko – Former Devils player (retired); Devils color analyst
- Rachel Herzog – Devils studio host
- Bryce Salvador – Former Devils player (Captain); Devils studio analyst

==== Islanders ====
- Brendan Burke – Islanders play-by-play announcer
- Alan Feuhring – Islanders alternate play-by-play announcer
- Butch Goring – Islanders color analyst
- Thomas Hickey – Islanders alternate color analyst
- Shannon Hogan – Islanders host/reporter
- Corey Schneider – hockey analyst

==== Sabres ====
- Dan Dunleavy – Sabres play-by-play announcer
- Rob Ray – Sabres color analyst
- Brian Duff – Sabres studio host
- Martin Biron – Sabres studio analyst

=== Soccer ===
- Steve Cangialosi – Red Bulls play-by-play announcer
- Shep Messing – Red Bulls color analyst
- Michelle Gingras – Red Bulls sideline reporter and studio host; host of Red Bulls Insider
- Kristian Dyer – Red Bulls insider and studio analyst
- Jonathan Yardley – Red Bulls alternate play-by-play announcer and studio analyst

=== MSG Radio Network ===
- Alex Faust – Rangers primary play-by-play announcer
- Dave Starman – Rangers primary radio color commentator
- Tyler Murray – Knicks primary play-by-play commentator
- Brendan Brown – Knicks radio color analyst
- Bill Daughtry – Knicks studio host
- Alex Thomas - Rangers fill-in play-by-play announcer
- Pete Stemkowski – Rangers fill-in color analyst
- Matt Harmon - Red Bulls play-by-play announcer
- Steve Jolley - Red Bulls color analyst

=== Former on-air staff ===
- Roberto Abramowitz - Spanish-language play-by-play announcer
- Marv Albert – Knicks and Rangers play-by-play announcer; MSG SportsDesk anchor
- John Andariese – Knicks radio and TV color analyst (deceased)
- Gary Apple – MSG SportsDesk anchor (now with SportsNet New York)
- Steve Cangialosi – Devils play by play
- Bill Chadwick – Rangers radio and TV color analyst (deceased)
- Jonathan Coachman – MSG, NY host; Knicks pre-game and halftime host, Liberty play-by-play announcer
- Doug Collins – Knicks color analyst (2003–04)
- Mike Crispino – Knicks alternate play-by-play announcer
- John Davidson – Rangers color analyst
- JP Dellacamera – Red Bulls play-by-play announcer (now with ESPN)
- Mike "Doc" Emrick – Devils play-by-play announcer
- Danny Gare – Sabres studio analyst
- Jim Gordon – Rangers TV play-by-play announcer (deceased)
- Fran Healy – host of Halls of Fame and The Game 365
- Keith Hernandez – Mets color analyst (now with SportsNet New York)
- Rick Jeanneret – Sabres play by play (deceased)
- Gus Johnson – Knicks Radio play-by-play announcer (now with Fox Sports and Big Ten Network)
- Jim Kaat – Yankees color announcer
- Michael Kay – Yankees reporter and pre-game host (now with YES Network and WEPN-FM)
- Tony Kubek – Yankees announcer
- Jim Lorentz – Sabres color analyst
- Brad May – Sabres studio analyst
- Curt Menefee – Unnecessary Roughness host and MSG SportsDesk lead anchor (now with Fox Sports)
- Harry Neale – Sabres color analyst
- Bob Page – MSG SportsDesk anchor
- Glenn "Chico" Resch – Devils color analyst
- Mike Robitaille – Sabres studio analyst
- Howie Rose – Islanders play by play
- Malik Rose – Knicks halftime studio analyst (now with Comcast SportsNet Philadelphia)
- Sam Rosen – Rangers play-by-play announcer
- Spencer Ross – Knicks studio host; Fill-in Knicks radio play-by-play announcer
- Dave Sims - Knicks Post Game, Hosted a Simulcast of 66 WNBC SportsNight 1986–1988, Host of GameFace on MSG Metro Channel June 2000 - December 2001
- Ken Singleton – Yankees color announcer
- Kenny Smith – Knicks color analyst (2005–08, concurrent with his time with TNT) (now with TNT)
- Tommy Smyth – Red Bulls color analyst (now with ESPN)
- Bill Spaulding – Devils play-by-play announcer
- Kevin Sylvester – Sabres studio host
- Erika Wachter – Devils studio host
- Jenna Wolfe – sports reporter (now moderator of "First Things First" on FS1)
- Ethan Zohn – co-host of MSG Soccer Report

== Carriage disputes ==
MSG was dropped from Dish Network due to a contract dispute in October 2010; the dispute remains unresolved. MSG was removed from Time Warner Cable at midnight on December 31, 2011, as the two companies could not agree on a new carriage contract; the network was restored on all TWC systems on February 17, 2012. MSG HD was not available on Verizon FiOS until several months after a court order forced MSG to provide the network's HD feed to that provider. MSG was dropped by Comcast in September 2021 and remains unavailable.

On January 1, 2025, MSG was removed from Altice USA's cable systems. Altice bought the former Cablevision systems which was under the same ownership as MSG until its sale. The dispute has since been resolved.

== Alternate channels ==
Along with MSG and MSG Sportsnet, MSG also operates secondary channels, MSG2 and MSG Sportsnet 2, which mainly serve to assist in scheduling the many sporting events it carries. Select New York Islanders and New Jersey Devils games also air on MSG when both teams play concurrently, with one airing on MSG Sportsnet, which along with MSG and its alternate channels are officially referred to as MSG Media. In turn, select Rangers games air on MSG Sportsnet, when Knicks telecasts are shown on MSG and no live game is airing on MSG Sportsnet at the same time. Any sports event to which MSG holds the broadcast rights could air on either channel.

If more than two of the four local teams it carries are playing at the same time, MSG normally goes to the Knicks – the highest-rated property on the channel – except for instances when that night's game is scheduled for a late start time, in which case a Rangers game will air instead. In all other cases, Rangers games are broadcast on MSG2. Devils or Islanders games air on MSG Sportsnet 2. If any teams are out of playoff contention, MSG will sometimes switch the order of priority among its teams. For several years in the 1990s when Cablevision had the rights to seven professional sports teams, an MSG3 overflow feed was occasionally used.

In the cases of MSG2 and MSG Sportsnet 2, the alternate channels vary. Many cable providers use Pop to carry the overflow/alternate feed, while satellite providers use an alternate channel. In some cases, these channels are not available outside the New York City area; however, they are offered by DirecTV, Dish Network and Comcast. In order to help alleviate confusion, MSG directs viewers to a special website.

=== MSG Western New York ===
Following the collapse of Empire Sports Network and its parent, Adelphia, MSG also picked up rights to the Buffalo Sabres, and agreed to a 10-year contract in 2006. The Sabres, through its broadcast arm, the Sabres Hockey Network, control the entire broadcast, including the sale of advertising, and pre- and post-game programming.

During the inaugural season, all regionally-televised Sabres games were available to viewers outside of the New York City area, falling within MSG's "Zone 3" (Buffalo and Rochester) and "Zone 2" (which encompasses the remainder of Upstate New York and is shared with the Devils, Islanders, and Rangers). In Zone 3, all Sabres games were shown on the main MSG channel, but some games aired in Zone 2 on MSG Sportsnet (then known as FSN New York) instead.

As part of a contract extension for the 2016–17 season, MSG entered into a joint venture with Terry and Kim Pegula's ownership group to create an expanded opt-out feed known as MSG Western New York over the former Zone 3. The feed is carried in place of MSG's main network within the Sabres' television market of Upstate New York (defined as virtually all of the state outside the New York City television market). In addition to coverage of Sabres games, the feed also carries Pegula-produced studio programming dedicated to the Sabres and their sister NFL team, the Buffalo Bills.

=== Metro Channels ===
From the fall of 1998 until the spring of 2005, Cablevision chose not to launch an additional MSG2 channel, instead placing games on its MSG Metro Channels, which were only available in a limited coverage footprint. Sometimes, games were also carried by Riverhead–licensed WLNY-TV (channel 55). During this period, when two of the teams that the MSG channels maintained game broadcast rights to played against one another, only one broadcast would usually be produced using one of the team's announcing staffs (this was either due to MSG's television contracts or a desire to show a different sporting event at the same time).

With the discontinuation of Metro, and the loss of the New Jersey Nets from the network's winter lineup, the MSG channels now produce two broadcasts when two of the area teams with broadcast rights held by the network are playing against each other. Since 2009, the channel now has gone back to producing a single unified broadcast, though it will use two sets of commentators (particularly for Buffalo, where the Sabres' radio announcers are simply dubbed over the MSG broadcast when they play the Rangers, Islanders or Devils).

=== WBIS-TV/S+ ===
In 1996, ITT Corporation (then half-owner of MSG) entered a joint-venture with Dow Jones & Company to purchase WNYC-TV from the City of New York and convert it to a hybrid sports/business news format. The channel was renamed WBIS-TV and branded as "S+". Beginning in January 1997, several Knicks and Rangers games that would have otherwise aired on MSG were moved to WBIS. Select Devils, Islanders, and Nets games from SportsChannel also aired on WBIS, temporarily relieving some of the need for multiple overflow channels. However, this would be short lived as by June the S+ format was cancelled and ITT would soon be selling both its interests in both MSG and WBIS.

== Related services ==
=== High definition ===

MSG HD is a high definition simulcast feed of MSG Network, which broadcasts in the 1080i resolution format, with the vast majority of content from MSG and Fox Sports Regional Networks broadcast in HD; as of 2017 only archived and paid programming is broadcast in standard definition. MSG HD is available nationally on DirecTV, Optimum, Spectrum, RCN, AT&T U-verse and Verizon FiOS.

On January 22, 2009, the NHL and MSG became involved in a contract dispute which has resulted in MSG HD and MSG+ HD's broadcasts being pulled from NHL's GameCenter Live service for viewers outside of the primary markets for the New Jersey Devils, New York Rangers, New York Islanders and Buffalo Sabres, with games presented in standard definition and upconverted to a stretched widescreen format. On March 17, 2010, beginning with the game between the New Jersey Devils and Pittsburgh Penguins, MSG HD and MSG+ HD broadcasts returned to NHL Center Ice (as confirmed by Gary Bettman during the NHL Hour broadcast).

Since its launch, MSG Network had blocked Verizon and AT&T from carrying MSG HD on any terms through a controversial guideline imposed by the Federal Communications Commission (known as the "terrestrial exception"), that was implemented to encourage investments in local programming, which stated that television channels that do not transmit via satellite uplink – MSG HD's programming is distributed to cable television providers through a terrestrial infrastructure using only microwave and fiber optic relays – have the authority to decide which pay television providers (cable, satellite or telco) can have access to its programming. Because the network was once owned by Cablevision (and remains under common control by the Dolan family to this day), MSG fought attempts by the telco providers to carry it despite the significant rights fees it could collect from carriage deals with those services. On September 22, 2011, the FCC ordered MSG to negotiate with both Verizon FiOS and AT&T U-verse for carriage on each system. MSG and Cablevision used every appeal available to keep the HD channels from being carried by both distributors; however on December 14, 2011, a three-judge panel of the Second Circuit Court of Appeals denied Cablevision/MSG Holdings' petition for review. Verizon FiOS began carrying MSG HD and MSG+ HD on its New York City area systems the next day, and AT&T U-Verse began carrying the HD feeds on its Connecticut systems later that month.

=== 3D ===
On March 24, 2010, MSG Network launched a 3D feed, MSG 3D, available only to Cablevision subscribers in the New York City area on channel 1300; its inaugural broadcast was a game between the New York Rangers and the New York Islanders. This was a one time broadcast and MSG elected not to produce any more telecasts. Channel 1300 was eventually deleted from the system.

=== MSG+ ===
In 2014, MSG Network launched a TV Everywhere service known as MSG Go, initially available for subscribers on Optimum.

On March 1, 2023, MSG Network announced its direct-to-consumer streaming service MSG+. The service will include live streams of MSG and MSG SportsNet and live streams of all MSG-produced Knicks, Rangers, Islanders, Devils, and Sabres games as well as other live sports, events and programming depending on users area. The service will cost $29.99 a month or $309.99 a year. There is an option to purchase single games for $9.99 each. MSG+ is also available for free to subscribers of participating pay television service providers of MSG Networks, replacing MSG Go.

On August 28, 2024, Gotham Advanced Media and Entertainment—a joint venture formed by MSG Networks and YES Network—announced that they would merge their networks' direct-to-consumer services under a new joint streaming platform known as Gotham Sports App, ahead of the 2024–25 NBA and NHL seasons. As before, MSG+ would be available on the service for free to subscribers of participating pay television service providers, while customers would be able to purchase subscriptions to both networks individually or as a bundle.

On July 29, 2026, MSG and YES announced that the service would be discontinued, and the networks would both partner with DAZN to host their DTC platforms going forward.

=== MSG Sports Zone ===
MSG Sports Zone is a free ad-supported streaming TV channel featuring original MSG studio programming. It is currently available on Vizio and Plex.

== Radio division ==
The radio division of MSG, known as the Madison Square Garden (MSG) Radio Network, produces Knicks, Rangers and Red Bulls broadcasts for New York City ESPN Radio station WHSQ (880 AM) and other radio stations across the region. Prior to the fall of 2004, MSG-produced Knicks, Rangers and MetroStars games aired on WFAN. The coordinating producer of MSG Radio is Ray Santiago.

MSG Network also presents certain game telecasts with a Spanish-language audio track, accessible through the second audio program feature on most television sets, through simulcasts from its radio partners; all Knicks home games and selected away games that are simulcast from WADO (1280 AM), while a Spanish-language track of Red Bulls and Rangers games are simulcast from ESPN Radio station WEPN (1050 AM).

| Preceded by SportsChannel; 1981–1988 | Cable; Home of the New York Yankees; 1989–2001 | Succeeded by YES Network; 2002–present |
| Preceded by SportsChannel/FSN New York; 1980–2005 | Cable; Home of the New York Mets; 2002–2005 (split with FSN New York) | Succeeded by SNY; 2006–present |
