= Alan Fuehring =

American sportscaster (born 1990)

Alan Fuehring (born January 12, 1990) is an American sportscaster covering the New York Islanders for MSG Networks. He is also the team's lead radio play-by-play broadcaster.

== Early life ==
Fuehring was born in Peoria, Illinois, and raised in nearby Morton, Illinois.

== Broadcasting career ==
Fuehring studied sports communication at Bradley University from 2008 to 2012, where he also served as an announcer for the baseball, softball, volleyball, men's soccer and women's basketball programs. He also volunteered with the school's student radio station and interned with the local AHL hockey team, the Peoria Rivermen. Following graduation, he joined Fox Sports as a production assistant in Charlotte, North Carolina covering motorsports for NASCAR Race Hub on FS1, formerly Speed Channel.

At age 23, he was hired by the Peoria Rivermen as their first play-by-play broadcaster in the SPHL.

Fuehring spent the 2013-14 season with the Rivermen and the next two seasons with the Greenville Swamp Rabbits, the New York Rangers' affiliate at the time. During his time in Greenville, South Carolina, he was honored as a finalist for the 2016 ECHL Broadcaster of the Year.

Fuehring joined the Bridgeport Sound Tigers as their radio play-by-play broadcaster and public relations manager in August 2016. He called the 2018 AHL All-Star Classic in Utica, New York for Sirius XM NHL Radio. During the 2020-21 NHL season, Fuehring filled in for Chris King on select games as the New York Islanders play-by-play broadcaster on ESPN Radio New York.

Fuehring was part of the Chicago Blackhawks broadcast team during the 2021-22 season. He filled in for John Wiedeman on the Blackhawks' WGN radio broadcast on October 30, 2021, against the St. Louis Blues. Fuehring also sat in for Pat Foley on three Blackhawks' television games including his NBC Sports Chicago debut on January 1, 2022, against the Nashville Predators.

Since April 2022, Fuehring has worked as a play-by-play announcer and host for MSG Networks working alongside analysts Butch Goring, Thomas Hickey and Cal Clutterbuck. He was hired full-time by the New York Islanders as their lead play-by-play radio broadcaster on September, 24, 2025.

On February 2–3, 2025, Fuehring joined veteran broadcaster R.J. Broadhead for the national telecast of the 2025 AHL All-Star Classic in Palm Desert, California, which aired live on NHL Network in the United States and TSN in Canada.. He served as lead television play-by-play voice for the 2026 AHL All-Star Classic in Rockford, Illinois on February 10-11, 2026.
