= Bob Lawrence =

American baseball player (1899–1983)

- Pitcher
- Born: December 14, 1899; Brooklyn, New York
- Died: November 6, 1983 (aged 83); Jamaica, New York
- Batted: Right Threw: Right

MLB debut
- July 19, 1924, for the Chicago White Sox

Last MLB appearance
- July 19, 1924, for the Chicago White Sox

MLB statistics
- Win–loss record: 0–0
- Earned run average: 9.00
- Strikeouts: 1
- Stats at Baseball Reference

Teams
- Chicago White Sox (1924)

Robert Andrew Lawrence (December 14, 1899 – November 6, 1983) was a Major League Baseball pitcher who played in one game for the Chicago White Sox on July 19, 1924. He pitched in one inning and recorded one strikeout, with ERA of 9.00. He allowed one hit, one earned run, and one walk.
