= WRHU =

Radio station at Hofstra University in Hempstead, New York

- Hempstead, New York; United States
- Broadcast area: Nassau County
- Frequency: 88.7 MHz

Programming
- Language: English
- Format: Eclectic
- Affiliations: New York Riptide; New York Islanders radio network (flagship); Long Island Nets; Long Island Ducks; Hofstra Pride Athletic Teams

Ownership
- Owner: Hofstra University

History
- Former call signs: WVHC-FM (1969–1983)
- Call sign meaning: Radio Hofstra University

Technical information
- Licensing authority: FCC
- Facility ID: 27443
- Class: A
- ERP: 470 watts
- HAAT: 55 meters (180 ft)
- Transmitter coordinates: 40°43′3.00″N 73°36′12.00″W

Links
- Public license information: Public file; LMS
- Webcast: Listen live
- Website: www.hofstra.edu/wrhu/

WRHU (88.7 FM) is a college radio station licensed to Hempstead, New York, owned and operated by Hofstra University and broadcasting an eclectic radio format.

Since the 2010–11 NHL season, WRHU has been the radio home of New York Islanders games. Current Hofstra students produce, engineer, and perform on-air duties on all NY Islander game broadcasts alongside veteran NY Islander play-by-play announcer Chris King.

The station was named the National Association of Broadcasters' Non-Commercial Station of the Year in 2014, 2017, 2019, 2022 and 2025. It has also been ranked the number one college radio station in the country in The Princeton Review's 2015 and 2016 college rankings.

In 2023, WRHU and BUSH Radio launched the 1World Community Radio Network, an international collaboration highlighting community news from a positive solutions based perspective. Originally hosted by Andy Gladding, Jamie-Lee Freidricks, Mariama Kabbah and Cody Hmelar, the show now airs on multiple stations globally.

== Awards ==
=== 2020s ===
- National Association of Broadcasters (NAB) Marconi Awards – College Radio Station of the Year - 2022

=== 2010s ===
- National Association of Broadcasters (NAB) Marconi Awards – College Radio Station of the Year - 2019 (award formerly Non Commercial Station of the Year)
- National Association of Broadcasters (NAB) Marconi Awards – Non Commercial Station of the Year – 2017
- National Association of Broadcasters (NAB) Marconi Awards – Non Commercial Station of the Year – 2014

=== 2000s ===
- Society of Professional Journalists. Mark of Excellence Award Finalist – Best All-Around Radio Newscast – Newsline – 2010

== Alumni ==
=== 1950s ===
- Dan Ingram (a radio air announcer of the 1960s & 1970s on 77 WABC New York City and 1980s-2000s on 92.3 WKTU and 101.1 WCBS-FM New York City)
- Dick Maitland (multiple Emmy award-winning sound designer – Children's Television Workshop)

=== 1960s ===
- Alan Colmes (top rated national TV and radio talk show host)
- John DeBella (long time highly rated radio host, WMGK Philadelphia)

=== 1970s ===
- Steven Epstein (Grammy award-winning Senior Executive Producer / Sony Classical)

== See also ==
- College radio
- List of college radio stations in the United States
