= Bob Page (sportscaster) =

American sportscaster

Bob Page is an American sportscaster. In 1991, he was named Howard Cosell's successor on ABC Radio's Speaking of Sports, a twice-daily national commentary. Simultaneously, he was the lead anchor and original anchor of Sports Desk on MSG Network, a New York regional television sports network.

A magna cum laude graduate of Michigan State University, Page began his career in 1974 at Lansing, Michigan's WJIM-TV and radio. From there he worked 12 years in his hometown of Detroit at various stations, winning a national cable ACE award for co-hosting the show Sports View Today. He moved to New York City in 1988 to accept the MSG position. While there he was nominated two more times for the ACE award as best in-studio sports host in the United States. He was also nominated for a New York Emmy in 1990-91 for outstanding on-camera achievement.

In January 2019, sportscaster Eli Zaret launched "No Filter Sports Podcast," a one-hour show on controversial topics in sports and sports humor. The program features Bob Page and former Detroit Tigers star pitcher Denny McLain and is also heard on iHeartRadio, carried by stations in Michigan and Toledo, Ohio. It is produced under the auspices of Red Shovel Network in Detroit and its founder, Detroit radio personality Drew Lane.
