= Thomas Hickey (ice hockey) =

Canadian ice hockey player (born 1989)

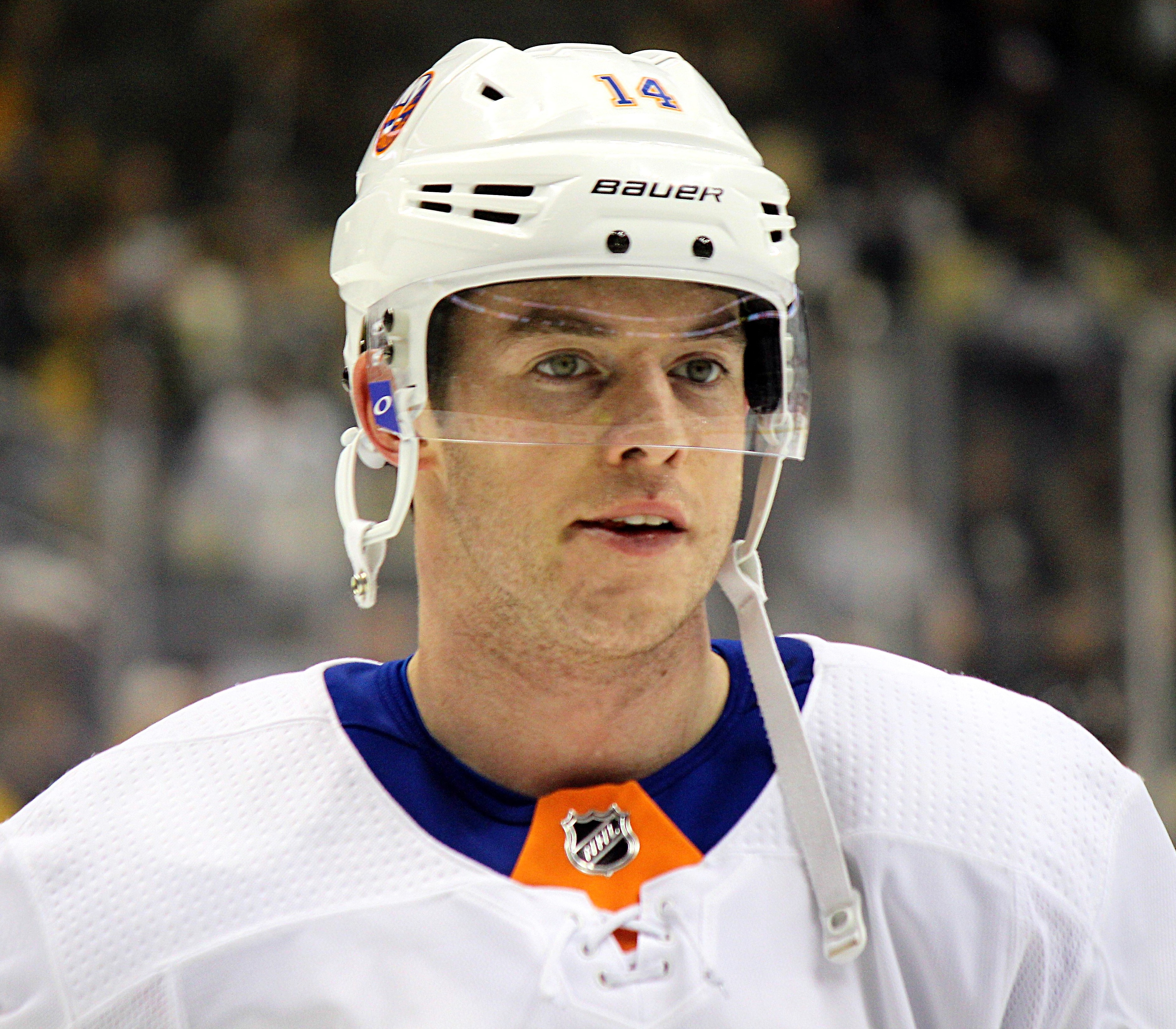
- Hickey with the New York Islanders in 2018
- Born: February 8, 1989 (age 37) Calgary, Alberta, Canada
- Height: 6 ft 0 in (183 cm)
- Weight: 185 lb (84 kg; 13 st 3 lb)
- Position: Defence
- Shot: Left
- Played for: New York Islanders
- NHL draft: 4th overall, 2007; Los Angeles Kings
- Playing career: 2009–2022

Thomas Robert Hickey (born February 8, 1989) is a Canadian broadcaster and former professional ice hockey player. Hickey was a defenceman for the New York Islanders of the National Hockey League (NHL).

== Early life ==
Hickey is a high school graduate of the Edge School in Calgary, Alberta.

== Playing career ==
Hickey joined the Seattle Thunderbirds of the Western Hockey League (WHL) in 2004–05 in a limited role for 5 games. The following season, in 2005–06, he tallied 28 points as a rookie. In his draft year, in 2006–07, Hickey improved to 9 goals and 50 points. He was then drafted in the off-season by the Los Angeles Kings in the first round, fourth overall, in the 2007 NHL entry draft. On July 17, 2007, he signed a three-year, entry-level contract with the Kings. Attending the Kings' training camp, he was returned to the Thunderbirds on September 21, 2007, for a third junior season. During the 2008–09 season, Hickey suffered an ankle injury that required surgery after the season. In November 2009, he suffered a shoulder injury that would also require surgery and keep him off the ice until April 1, 2010. Not much later, one game before the Monarchs would begin their playoff run for the 2009–10 season, Hickey sprained his ankle and was unable to play until the semi-finals, when the Monarchs lost to the Hershey Bears. During his time with the Monarchs, Hickey was named an alternate captain.

On January 15, 2013, Hickey was claimed off waivers from the Kings by the New York Islanders. He immediately joined the team during the 2012–13 training camp. He made his NHL debut with the Islanders on January 27, 2013, against the Winnipeg Jets at the MTS Centre. On February 21, 2013, Hickey scored his first NHL goal, an overtime winner against the Montreal Canadiens at the Bell Centre.

In the 2015–16 season, Hickey scored the overtime winner against the Washington Capitals, and with that goal the Islanders clinched a playoff spot in the 2016 Stanley Cup playoffs. Just two weeks later, Hickey scored his first playoff goal in Game 3 in overtime against the Florida Panthers on a pass from Brock Nelson, giving the Islanders a 2–1 series lead. On July 1, 2018, Hickey signed a four-year contract with the Islanders.

Heading into the 2019–20 season, having lost his spot during the 2018–19 season due to injury and the subsequent emergence of Devon Toews, coupled with the Islanders needing an NHL roster spot for Noah Dobson, Hickey was waived and sent to play for the Bridgeport Sound Tigers. Despite being limited to just 14 games for the Sound Tigers, Hickey was the Islanders nominee for the Bill Masterton Memorial Trophy in the 2019–20 season following the death of his older brother, Dan.

Hickey played out the remaining three years of his contract within the Islanders organization mostly with their AHL affiliate, the Bridgeport Islanders. During his final professional season, Hickey was loaned by the Islanders to finish his career with the Ontario Reign of the AHL, the affiliate of his original NHL club, the Los Angeles Kings.

== International play ==
Medal record

Representing Canada

Ice hockey

World Junior Championships
Gold medal – first place	2008 Czech Republic	
Gold medal – first place	2009 Canada	

During his third year of major junior, Hickey was chosen to represent Canada for the 2008 World Junior Championships in the Czech Republic, where he helped Canada to a fourth consecutive gold medal. He was selected the next year for the 2009 World Junior Championships in Ottawa as the team captain, returning with John Tavares, P. K. Subban and Zach Boychuk from the previous year's team. In the third game of preliminaries, he was chosen as Canada's player of the game in a 5–1 win against Germany. Canada went on to beat Sweden in the finals for the third straight year to capture its fifth consecutive WJHC gold medal.

== Broadcasting career ==
Following a 12-year professional playing career, Hickey effectively announced his retirement in joining the MSG Network's New York Islanders broadcast team on October 27, 2022.

In April 2024, Canadian NHL broadcast rightsholder Rogers Communications announced that it had struck a deal to shift a portion of its rights – specifically the Monday night games played in Canada – from its own NHL on Sportsnet broadcast to Amazon Prime Video for the 2024–25 and 2025–26 regular seasons. In September, it was announced that Hickey would provide analysis and interviews during Prime Monday Night Hockey, including reports from between the benches, when it launched with a game in Montreal on October 14, 2024. Hickey also continues his work as part of the MSG broadcast team for Islanders games.

== Career statistics ==
=== Regular season and playoffs ===
			Regular season					Playoffs
Season	Team	League	GP	G	A	Pts	PIM	GP	G	A	Pts	PIM
2004–05	Seattle Thunderbirds	WHL	5	2	1	3	5	—	—	—	—	—
2005–06	Seattle Thunderbirds	WHL	69	1	27	28	53	7	1	3	4	10
2006–07	Seattle Thunderbirds	WHL	68	9	41	50	70	11	3	4	7	4
2007–08	Seattle Thunderbirds	WHL	63	11	34	45	49	9	1	9	10	4
2008–09	Seattle Thunderbirds	WHL	57	16	35	51	30	5	2	1	3	4
2008–09	Manchester Monarchs	AHL	7	1	6	7	2	—	—	—	—	—
2009–10	Manchester Monarchs	AHL	19	1	5	6	12	4	0	3	3	0
2010–11	Manchester Monarchs	AHL	77	6	18	24	38	7	0	2	2	0
2011–12	Manchester Monarchs	AHL	76	2	23	26	36	4	0	4	4	2
2012–13	Manchester Monarchs	AHL	33	3	9	12	12	—	—	—	—	—
2012–13	New York Islanders	NHL	39	1	3	4	8	2	0	0	0	2
2013–14	New York Islanders	NHL	82	4	18	22	34	—	—	—	—	—
2014–15	New York Islanders	NHL	81	2	20	22	26	7	0	1	1	2
2015–16	New York Islanders	NHL	62	6	12	18	30	11	1	4	5	8
2016–17	New York Islanders	NHL	76	4	16	20	35	—	—	—	—	—
2017–18	New York Islanders	NHL	69	5	20	25	24	—	—	—	—	—
2018–19	New York Islanders	NHL	40	0	4	4	33	4	0	0	0	0
2018–19	Bridgeport Sound Tigers	AHL	2	2	2	4	0	—	—	—	—	—
2019–20	Bridgeport Sound Tigers	AHL	14	0	3	3	10	—	—	—	—	—
2020–21	New York Islanders	NHL	5	0	2	2	0	—	—	—	—	—
2021–22	Bridgeport Islanders	AHL	29	4	8	12	12	—	—	—	—	—
2021–22	New York Islanders	NHL	2	0	0	0	0	—	—	—	—	—
2021–22	Ontario Reign	AHL	15	2	4	6	6	5	0	2	2	0
NHL totals			456	22	95	117	190	24	1	5	6	12

=== International ===
Year	Team	Event	Result	GP	G	A	Pts	PIM
2006	Canada Pacific	U17	4th	6	0	8	8	6
2006	Canada	IH18	1st place, gold medalist(s)	4	0	1	1	2
2008	Canada	WJC	1st place, gold medalist(s)	7	0	1	1	4
2009	Canada	WJC	1st place, gold medalist(s)	6	0	3	3	2
Junior totals				23	0	13	13	14

== Awards and honours ==
Award	Year
WHL
West Second All-Star Team	2007
West First All-Star Team	2008, 2009
AHL
All-Star Game	2012

Awards and achievements
Preceded by Trevor Lewis	Los Angeles Kings first-round draft pick 2007	Succeeded by Drew Doughty
