= MSG Sportsnet =

Regional sports network in New York City

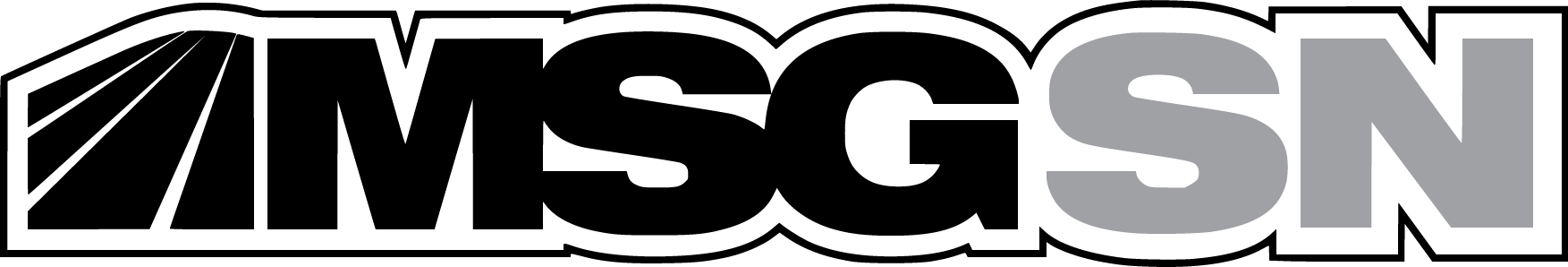
- Type: Regional sports network
- Country: United States
- Broadcast area: New York; Northern & Central New Jersey; Southeastern Connecticut; Southwestern Connecticut; Northeastern Pennsylvania; Nationwide (via satellite)
- Headquarters: Pennsylvania Plaza, New York, NY 10001

Programming
- Languages: English; Spanish (via SAP)
- Picture format: 1080i (HDTV); 480i (SDTV)

Ownership
- Owner: MSG Networks, Inc.
- Parent: Sphere Entertainment
- Key people: James L. Dolan (Chairman & CEO)
- Sister channels: MSG Network; MSG Western New York

History
- Founded: 1976; 50 years ago
- Founder: Charles Dolan
- Former names: Cablevision Sports 3 (1976–1979); SportsChannel New York (1979–1998); Fox Sports New York (1998–1999); Fox Sports Net New York (1999–2004); FSN New York (2004–2008); MSG Plus (2008–2022)

Links
- Website: www.msgnetworks.com

Availability

Streaming media
- MSG+ on DAZN: www.dazn.com/en-US/welcome/msgplusyes (Requires a DAZN account or existing Gotham Sports account, and a login from participating providers or a subscription to stream content; some events may not be available due to league rights restrictions)
- DirecTV Stream: 635
- FuboTV: Available within designated area

MSG Sportsnet (MSGSN, formerly MSG Plus) is an American regional sports network owned by Sphere Entertainment; it operates as a sister channel to MSG Network. The network serves the New York City metropolitan area, whose reach expands to cover the entire state of New York, Northern New Jersey, Southwestern Connecticut and Northeastern Pennsylvania; MSG Sportsnet carries sports events from several of the New York area's professional sports franchises, as well as college sports events.

The channel was first established in 1976 by Cablevision as Cablevision Sports 3; the channel later rebranded as SportsChannel New York, and became the charter affiliate of an eponymous chain of regional sports networks. The channel became a sister to MSG Network in 1995 after Cablevision acquired the Madison Square Garden company. In 1998, the channel—along with the remainder of the SportsChannel chain—was relaunched as part of Fox Sports Networks, later becoming FSN New York. In March 2008, the channel rebranded as MSG Plus to closer align it with its parent channel; the service later dropped FSN programming.

== History ==
=== SportsChannel New York ===
MSG+ originally launched in 1976 as Cablevision Sports 3, a local sports network owned by Cablevision and available to their subscribers on Long Island (the "3" referenced the network's channel slot on Cablevision, where it remained through the 1990s). When it debuted, the network had agreements to carry the home games of the New York Islanders and New York Nets. The service was renamed SportsChannel New York in March 1979. The next month, both the New York Yankees and New York Mets signed agreements with SportsChannel. SportsChannel would also gain the New Jersey Devils when the team relocated in 1982.

As the original SportsChannel was growing in popularity in New York City, Cablevision (through its then-broadcasting unit, Rainbow Media) eventually decided to form a new group of regional sports networks under the SportsChannel brand, with SportsChannel New York serving as the flagship charter affiliate. The expansion began with Cablevision's purchase of PRISM New England, a Boston-based premium channel previously owned by Spectacor, which was rechristened as SportsChannel New England on January 1, 1983. Other SportsChannel networks launched between throughout the 1980s and early 1990s in markets such as San Francisco, Chicago, Philadelphia and Los Angeles.

Throughout most of its history SportsChannel was operated as a joint-venture. The Washington Post became a partner in SportsChannel in 1983, gaining 50% interest in the networks. In 1984, CBS also entered the partnership in a deal that gave each of the three companies a one-third interest. The Washington Post and CBS sold back their shares to Rainbow in 1987.

In December 1988, Cablevision announced that it would form a joint venture with NBC to operate the cable networks owned by the respective companies, including SportsChannel. Through this partnership, SportsChannel acquired the cable television rights to the National Hockey League, which aired several games involving non-New York area teams on the SportsChannel regional networks at times when no games involving local teams were set to air and served as the programming cornerstone for national sister network SportsChannel America.

SportsChannel New York lost the broadcast rights to the Yankees to the MSG Network, then its main competitor, after the 1988 season. This led to a lengthy dispute between Cablevision and MSG that resulted in the network being removed by the provider, resulting in many Cablevision subscribers not being able to see MSG's Yankees telecasts during the 1989 season.

In March 1995, Cablevision and ITT Corporation purchased Madison Square Garden and its properties which included the Knicks, the Rangers, and the MSG Network; giving Cablevision broadcast rights to all professional New York-area sports teams (except the NFL, whose broadcast rights are nationalized). On April 25, 1995, NBC sold its 50% interest in SportsChannel New York to Rainbow Media for US$93 million, citing that "owning a piece of SportsChannel New York made less sense" after Cablevision and ITT purchased MSG.

=== FSN New York ===
On June 30, 1997, Fox/Liberty Networks—a joint venture between News Corporation (then the parent company of the New York Post and Fox owned-and-operated station WNYW) and Liberty Media (a spin-off of TCI, an American cable-television group) -- purchased a 40% interest in the SportsChannel networks, Madison Square Garden, the New York Knicks and the New York Rangers from Cablevision. The deal was intended to expand the reach of Fox Sports Net—a group of regional sports networks launched by Fox/Liberty in November 1996 through News Corporation's purchase of Liberty's Prime Network—by integrating the SportsChannel networks into the group; SportsChannel New York would also be rebranded as Fox Sports New York, while MSG would also become an FSN outlet, while retaining its existing brand.

National Sports Partners, the venture formed through Cablevision's entry into the News Corporation/Liberty partnership to operate the existing and newly acquired Fox Sports owned-and-operated regional networks, later announced that the other SportsChannel networks would be relaunched under the "Fox Sports Net" banner. Prior to the deal with Cablevision, FSN programming had aired on then-independent station WBIS-TV during its S+ era, where it carried a hybrid of sporting and business programming; by June 1998 the station dropped the format and eventually became WPXN-TV (though it continued to air Fox-sourced programming until August); FSN programming was subsequently picked up by SportsChannel in the run-up to the relaunch as FSNY, with SportsChannel's own national programming being discontinued in favor of Fox's programming. The last event broadcast on the network as SportsChannel New York aired on January 27, 1998, was an NBA game between the New Jersey Nets and Denver Nuggets at the McNichols Sports Arena in Denver.

SportsChannel New York officially became Fox Sports New York the following day on January 28, with the first event aired as a Fox Sports Net outlet that evening being an NBA game between the Nets and the Los Angeles Lakers at Great Western Forum in Inglewood, California. Five of the seven other remaining SportsChannel networks relaunched as member networks of Fox Sports Net later that week (SportsChannel Florida, which was rechristened Fox Sports Florida, was the last to join FSN in March 2000, after Rainbow bought Florida Panthers owner Wayne Huizenga's controlling interest). The network was later rebranded as Fox Sports Net New York in 2000, as part of a collective brand modification of the FSN networks under the "Fox Sports Net" banner.

In April 2002, Fox Sports Net New York began sharing the broadcast rights to the Mets with MSG, as the newly launched YES Network took the regional television rights to the Yankees and Nets (both owned by their and the network's co-parent at the time, YankeeNets) from FSN. In 2004, the channel shortened its name to FSN New York, through the networks' de-emphasis of the "Fox Sports Net" brand.

On February 22, 2005, Cablevision and News Corp agreed to trade several sports-related assets. Cablevision acquired majority control in Fox Sports New York, Fox Sports Chicago, Madison Square Garden and its associated properties, and a 50% share of Fox Sports New England; News Corp, meanwhile, received Cablevision's ownership stakes in Fox Sports Ohio and Fox Sports Florida. (Fox Sports Bay Area was not included in the deal, as News Corp and Cablevision chose to retain joint ownership of that network.) (News Corporation would later reverse course and purchase a 49% stake in YES Network in November 2012.)

In 2005, the Mets announced that it would launch its own sports network to carry the team's games after FSN New York's contract with the team expired; SportsNet New York became the Mets new cable home when it launched in April 2006, at the start of that year's regular season. As a result of losing the Yankees, Nets, and Mets over the span of three years, FSN New York and MSG went from being the sole rightsholders to seven of the New York area's major sports franchises to only four.

=== MSG+/MSGSN ===
On February 26, 2008, Cablevision announced that it would rebrand FSN New York as MSG Plus (branded in logos as "MSG+"), restructuring it as a spin-off of MSG Network. The last event to air under the FSN New York banner was a college basketball game between the Mount St. Mary's Mountaineers and the Robert Morris Colonials from Moon Township, Pennsylvania on March 9.

The network was rebranded as MSG+ at 7:00 p.m. on March 10, beginning with its broadcast of an exhibition tennis match at Madison Square Garden between Roger Federer and Pete Sampras (which was also distributed nationally on the Tennis Channel).

In February 2010, Cablevision spun off MSG Network and MSG+ into The Madison Square Garden Company. After News Corporation acquired a stake in the channel, rights to FSN national programming moved to YES Network.

On September 26, 2022, MSG Plus rebranded as MSG Sportsnet (MSGSN), as the "Plus" suffix has largely become synonymous with streaming services. MSG would announce a streaming service under the MSG Plus branding in March 2023.

On August 28, 2024, MSG Networks, along with the YES Network announced a combined streaming app for their teams called the Gotham Sports App. Their television rights are not affected.

== Programming ==
=== Professional sports ===
MSGSN holds the regional broadcast rights to the NHL's New Jersey Devils and New York Islanders. MSG Sportsnet also serves an overflow feed in the event that multiple local teams whose games would normally be televised on MSG (such as the NBA's New York Knicks and the NHL's Buffalo Sabres) are playing at the same time. In turn, through MSG's regional television rights agreements, MSG Sportsnet also broadcasts certain NHL games involving the New York Rangers and Major League Soccer games featuring the New York Red Bulls not broadcast by its parent network. MSG Sportsnet also carries a large proportion of Buffalo Sabres games available to subscribers in most of upstate New York.

The network carries New York Rangers and Red Bulls games, which mainly air on MSG, in the event that its parent network is scheduled to air a Knicks (in the case of the Rangers) or Liberty (for Red Bulls and until 2018) game at times when MSGSN is not carrying games of its main local teams. Games respectively involving the Knicks and Liberty (which no longer airs on MSG as of 2018) earn higher ratings on MSG than those involving the Rangers or Red Bulls, and rarely air on MSGSN as a result. This is also the case with MSG, as the Islanders or Devils air on that network in lieu of MSGSN, when those teams play simultaneously at times none of MSG's main contracted teams are playing.

Since the start of 2006–07 NBA and NHL seasons, some Rangers telecasts have aired on MSGSN even when there is a conflict with an Islanders and/or Devils telecast, resulting in these games being relocated to MSG2 and/or MSGSN 2. In addition, when the Knicks are not in contention for the NBA Playoffs and the Rangers are contending for the Stanley Cup playoffs, the Rangers telecast usually airs on MSG and the Knicks telecast on MSG2, or vice versa in either case.

=== College sports ===
MSGSN also airs college sports events and local weekly college basketball magazine program for Hofstra University. However, games involving teams in the Tri-State area are generally blacked out outside the New York City market. Some cable providers, such as Time Warner Cable, acquire the rights to the local games for broadcast on local origination and regional sports channels in certain markets. MSGSN previously carried most college sports events televised by Fox Sports Networks (including football and basketball games from the Pac-12 Conference and Big 12 Conference), before these rights were transferred to the YES Network in September 2013 as part of its affiliation with FSN through 21st Century Fox's ownership interest in the network. Nationally televised FSN games aired in all of MSGSN's broadcast zones, unless a local team was playing at the time of the national telecast. In such cases, the collegiate event would be joined-in-progress at the end of the local telecast (if the ended before the conclusion of the national game) on MSG, if there is no other live game telecast scheduled, or not at all.

=== Fox Sports Net programs ===
Since joining Fox Sports Net, MSGSN had also carried select non-sports programming distributed by FSN (such as FSN Final Score, The Best Damn Sports Show Period and The Dan Patrick Show). Even after the network's rebranding as MSGSN, it continued to carry these programs until they were discontinuance, similar to a programming agreement FSN maintained with Comcast SportsNet affiliates in markets where there is no local FSN outlet (although CSN maintains a local affiliation with SportsNet New York). As FSN New York, MSGSN formerly aired some Arena Football League games involving the New York Dragons as part of the AFL on FSN package.

== Related services ==
=== MSGSN 2 ===
MSGSN 2 is a gametime-only overflow feed of MSG Sportsnet, that – along with the MSG overflow MSG 2 – broadcasts in the event that three or four local games are scheduled to air simultaneously on the two main networks (for example, a Knicks or Rangers game would air on MSG2, while an Islanders or a Devils match would be shown on MSGSN 2). Normally, New York Knicks games are televised over MSG2 only during road games that start at least one hour later than a Rangers telecasts due to the fact that the Knicks (whose telecasts are the highest-rated sports events on MSG Network) normally take precedence on the main MSG network when played at Madison Square Garden. However, several Knicks home games originally scheduled to air on MSG were moved to MSG2 in 2008, in order for the former to carry the Rangers' Stanley Cup Playoff matches.

Previous names for this service were SportsChannel Plus, SportsChannel 2, Fox Sports New York 2 (FSNY2), and MSG Plus 2 (MSG+ 2). Traditionally cable providers mainly transmit MSG 2 and MSGSN 2 by preempting telecasts on other non-critical networks (such as a Public-access channel, the TV Guide Network, The Weather Channel, or C-SPAN); conversely, satellite providers carry both networks on alternate provider-assigned channels. With digital cable, many providers today now have dedicated channels for overflow games. For several years in the 1990s when Cablevision had the rights to seven professional sports teams, a SportsChannel 3 overflow feed was occasionally used.

From 1998 to 2005, Cablevision instead placed MSG's NBA and NHL telecasts on the MSG Metro Channels, which had limited availability within the provider's systems in the New York metropolitan area. In high cases of overflow, partially caused by New Jersey Nets telecasts aired on the then-rebranded FSN New York at the same time, games were also aired on Riverhead-based independent station WLNY-TV (channel 55). During this era, when two of the teams that the MSG Networks held the rights to broadcast played against each other, only one broadcast would usually be produced using one of the team's announcing staffs. This was either due to stipulations in MSG's television contracts or a desire to show a different sporting event at the same time. Beginning in the 2005–06 NBA and NHL seasons, after the Metro Networks ceased operation and the Nets telecasts moved to YES Network, MSG and the then-FSN New York relaunched MSG2 and FSN New York 2 (the present-day MSG+ 2) and began producing two separate broadcasts when two of their contracted teams play one another.

=== MSGSN HD ===
MSGSN HD is a high-definition simulcast feed of MSGSN HD, which broadcasts in the 1080i resolution format. It is carried on Cablevision (except on its system in Litchfield), Time Warner Cable (in New York and New Jersey), Comcast (which has carried MSGSN HD full-time since October 15, 2009 in areas of northern and central New Jersey within the New York City market) RCN, DirecTV and Verizon FiOS. Sister network MSGSN 2 also maintains an HD simulcast, whose availability depends on geographic location and television provider. MSGSN HD carries all games involving the New York Rangers, New York Islanders, New Jersey Devils and New York Red Bulls in high definition.

On January 22, 2009, hockey games broadcast by MSG HD and MSGSN HD were dropped from NHL's GameCenter Live service following a contract dispute between MSG and the National Hockey League; MSG HD and MSGSN HD returned to NHL Center Ice on March 17, 2010, beginning with the former's telecast of a game between the New Jersey Devils and Pittsburgh Penguins, confirmed on-air by NHL Hour co-host Gary Bettman during the program. On December 14, 2011, a three-judge panel of the Second Circuit Court of Appeals denied MSG Holdings' petition to review an order by the Federal Communications Commission that Cablevision make the HD feeds of its regional sports networks available for distribution to AT&T U-verse and Verizon FiOS.

== On-air staff ==
=== Current on-air staff ===
Game broadcasters

- Mike Breen – Knicks play-by-play announcer
- Walt Frazier – Knicks color analyst
- Kenny Albert – fill-in Knicks play-by-play announcer
- Mike Crispino – fill-in Knicks play-by-play announcer
- Sam Rosen – Rangers play-by-play announcer
- Joe Micheletti – Rangers color analyst
- John Giannone – Rangers sideline reporter; fill-in Rangers play-by-play announcer
- Brendan Burke – Islanders play-by-play announcer
- Butch Goring – Islanders color analyst
- A. J. Mleczko – fill-in Islanders color analyst
- Shannon Hogan – Islanders sideline reporter, pre-game and post-game show and intermission report host
- Rick DiPietro – Islanders pre-game, post-game, and intermission analyst
- Stan Fischler – Islanders pre-game, post-game, and intermission analyst
- Chris King – fill-in Islanders play-by-play announcer
- Jiggs McDonald – fill-in Islanders play-by-play announcer
- Steve Cangialosi – Red Bulls play-by-play announcer
- Bill Spaulding – Devils play-by-play announcer
- Ken Daneyko – Devils color analyst
- Bryce Salvador - Devils pre-game, post-game, and intermission analyst
- Dan Dunleavy – Sabres play-by-play announcer
- Rob Ray – Sabres sideline reporter
- Mike Robitaille – fill-in Sabres color analyst
- Brian Duff – Sabres pre-game, post-game, and intermission analyst
- Martin Biron – Sabres pre-game, post-game, and intermission analyst
- Jason Horowitz – Liberty play-by-play announcer
- Shep Messing – Red Bulls color analyst

Studio show staff

- Anson Carter – Rangers studio analyst
- Ron Duguay – Rangers studio analyst; MSG Hockey Night Live panelist
- Stan Fischler – MSG Hockey Night Live contributor, occasional Devils or Islanders sideline reporter
- EJ Hradek – MSG Hockey Night Live panelist
- Scott Lasky – Inside the Rangers host
- Brian Leetch – Rangers studio analyst
- Dave Maloney – Rangers pre-game and post-game analyst; MSG Hockey Night Live panelist; and fill-in Rangers color analyst/sideline reporter
- Bill Pidto – Rangers and Knicks (road games) pre-game and post-game show and intermission report host; MSG150 commentator; and MSG Hockey Night Live fill-in host
- Al Trautwig – MSG Hockey Night Live host; and Rangers and Knicks (home and playoff games) pre-game and post-game show and intermission report host
- Steve Valiquette – Rangers studio analyst; and MSG Hockey Night Live panelist

=== Awards ===
MSGSN (then MSG+) received Promax Awards in 2009 for their October 2008 rebranding campaign, its promotional campaign for the network's high school sports telecasts, and Devils and Islanders tuners.
