= Spencer Ross =

American sportscaster (born 1940)

- Born: July 19, 1940 (age 86); Brooklyn, New York, U.S.
- Education: Florida State University
- Occupation: Sports broadcaster

Spencer Ross (born July 19, 1940) is an American sportscaster. With the exception of the New York Mets, Ross has called play-by-play for every professional New York metropolitan area sports franchise, including the Yankees of MLB, the Nets and Knicks of the NBA, and Jets and Giants of the NFL. He has also called games for the Americans of the ABA and, in the NHL, for the New Jersey Devils, New York Islanders and the New York Rangers. Outside of New York, he has called games for the Florida State Seminoles and Boston Celtics. Nationally, he has worked for the NFL on NBC, Major League Baseball on CBS Radio, the NCAA Division I men's basketball tournament on Westwood One, and was the lead play-by-play announcer for the 1992 USA Olympic Dream Team with Dick Vitale.

Ross's mentor was Marty Glickman, who tutored Ross at around the same time as his better-known pupil, Marv Albert. Discussing his two star pupils (Albert and Ross), Glickman once noted that Ross was one of the best, if not the best radio play-by-player ever to call a game citing his distinctive voice and ability to make smooth transitions during game play. Further, Phil Rizzuto, one of Ross's broadcasting partners during the latter's three-year tenure with the Yankees, was once quoted as saying that Ross was "The Best Broadcaster" he had ever worked with.

Ross attended Florida State University on a basketball scholarship and, while there, called baseball and basketball games for the Seminoles and hosted a jazz show on WTNT in Tallahassee, Florida.

He currently does weekend sports updates for WINS-AM.

In 2009, he was inducted into the NYC Basketball Hall of Fame.

Ross was inducted into both the New York State Baseball and New York State Basketball Halls of Fame, becoming one of the first to be a dual New York State Hall of Fame inductee.
