= Professional ice hockey in Connecticut =

History of ice hockey in Connecticut

Professional ice hockey in Connecticut has a rich tradition dating from the mid-1920s. Most Connecticut teams were NHL minor league affiliates located in New Haven, though with the closure of the New Haven Coliseum, minor league affiliates now exist in Hartford and formerly Bridgeport. Hartford had its own National Hockey League team, the Whalers, who played in Hartford from 1974-97. Independent hockey leagues and teams have also been gaining a foothold in Danbury since 2004.

This article provides a summary of all past and present hockey teams from Connecticut, listed by city and league for reference, and links to main articles about each team.

== History ==
=== New Haven/Bridgeport ===
Minor League teams include player-development franchises affiliated with NHL teams, as well as independent (non-affiliate) teams

While New Haven has no currently active teams, New Haven has long been considered the birthplace of hockey in Connecticut. Teams have been hosted since the mid-1920s, first at the New Haven Arena until 1972 (demolished 1975), and followed by the New Haven Coliseum until 2002 (demolished in 2007). The New Haven Blades (1954–72) and later the New Haven Nighthawks (1972–93) were the most popular franchises. Since the Coliseum's closure in 2002, professional hockey has not returned to New Haven. The American Hockey League Sound Tigers have played in nearby Bridgeport since 2001.

In 1992, the Nighthawks signed a last-minute player-development affiliation with the Ottawa Senators, which required the team to be re-branded as the New Haven Senators for the 1992–93 season. Fans were ambivalent to the name change and attendance plummeted, making this the franchise last season in New Haven.

Hockey had a brief reboot with the arrival of former Hartford Whalers' affiliate, the Beast of New Haven (formerly the Carolina Monarchs), which were displaced from North Carolina by their parent team's relocation in 1997. They were followed by a two seasons of the independent New Haven Knights of the United Hockey League (UHL) from 2000–02. However, chronic maintenance issues in the New Haven Coliseum, as well as competition from other newer southern Connecticut arenas, prompted state and city officials to permanently close the arena in 2002, ultimately resulting in Knights' folding that same year. Demolition of the Coliseum began in 2005, starting with the tearing down of the arena area and concluding with the implosion of the signature elevated parking garage on January 20, 2007.

The Bridgeport Sound Tigers began play in the AHL in 2001, in the newly constructed Arena at Harbor Yard. During the first season of play, the Sound Tigers won their division championship and played in the Calder Cup Finals, though ultimately losing to the Chicago Wolves four games to one. As of the 2009 season, the team had seven winning seasons. Located 20 miles west of the New Haven Coliseum, competition from the Arena at Harbor Yard was one of the factors in the coliseum's demise. In 2021, the team was rebranded the Bridgeport Islanders after their long time NHL affiliate the New York Islanders. In 2026, the team was relocated to Hamilton, Ontario.

=== Hartford ===
Major league teams are franchises that played in the National Hockey League or the World Hockey Association

Hartford, the capital of Connecticut, was bereft of a professional ice hockey team until 1974, when the Whalers franchise from the World Hockey Association came to town, occupying the newly built Hartford Civic Center. After the Whalers relocated to North Carolina in 1997, the minor league team the Hartford Wolf Pack relocated to the Civic Center. In the years since, various proposals for a new arena have been submitted with the hope of attracting a new major league hockey team.

==== Major league ====
The former Hartford Whalers were the first and only major league hockey team located in Connecticut, nestled halfway between the Boston Bruins and New York Rangers/Islanders hockey markets. The team was founded in Boston as the New England Whalers, one of the original World Hockey Association teams (from whose initials "WHA" inspired the Whaler's name). The WHA planned for a rival team to play in New York on Long Island, however the NHL created the Islanders franchise to fill the desired arena, shutting them out of the market.

The Whalers moved to Hartford in 1974, and entered the NHL in 1979, where it became the Hartford Whalers. Although it had losing seasons its first two years in Hartford, the team had won the 1972–73 WHA championship while in Boston and, never missed the playoffs while in the WHA. The team had mixed success in the NHL before relocating to Raleigh, North Carolina in 1997 due to attendance and revenue issues.

==== Post NHL ====
Note: this section describes actions taken by third parties that are not affiliated with the Whalers/Hurricanes franchise

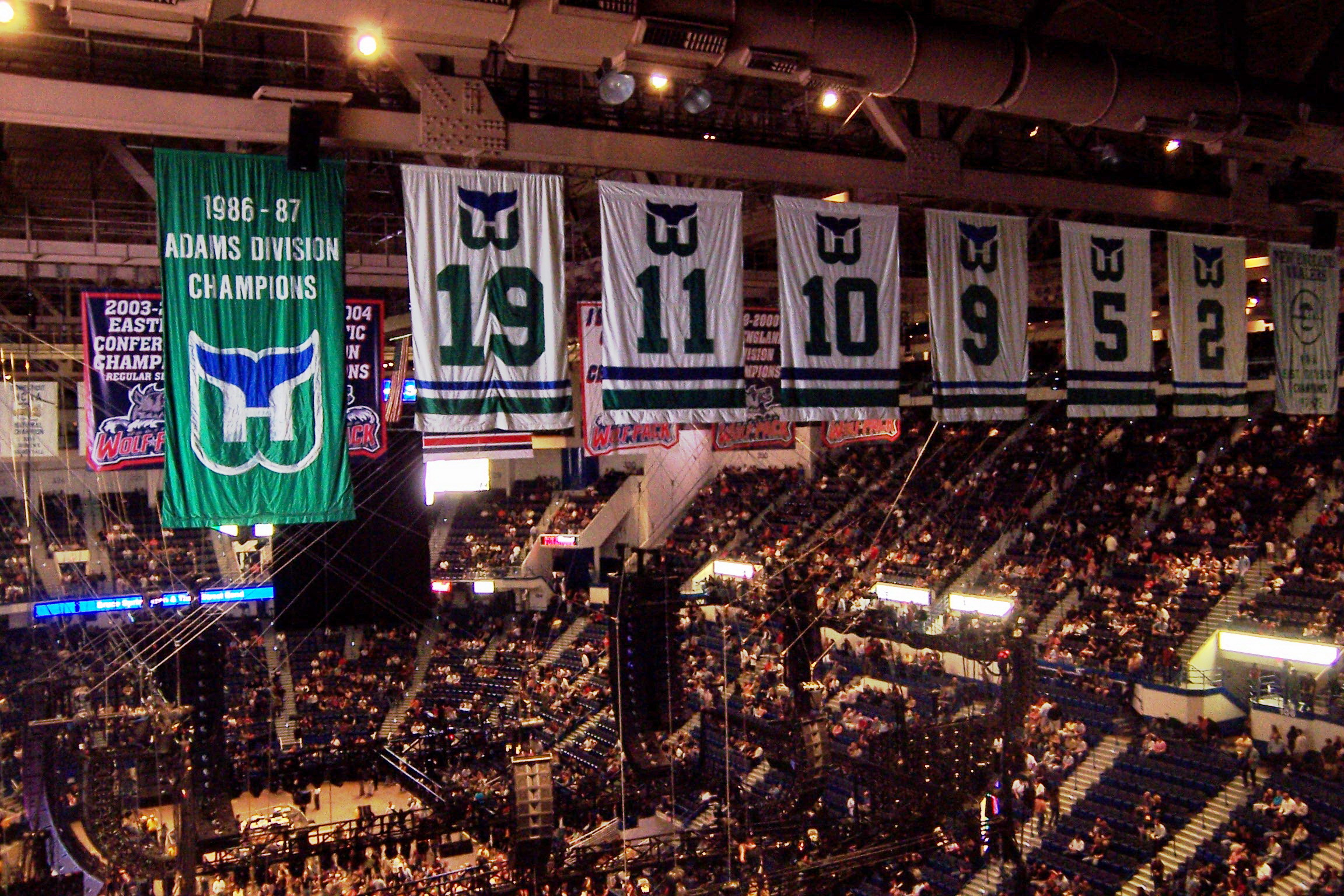
Whaler banners hanging from the Hartford Civic Center rafters in 2007. This set includes several numbers symbolically "retired" in 2006 by the Hartford Wolf Pack.

Years after the departure of the Whalers, the team remains a focus of civic pride among Connecticut residents. The retired jersey numbers still hang on green and white banner from the rafters of the former Hartford Civic Center (now called the PeoplesBank Arena) where the team played in Hartford. Aside from the jersey numbers officially retired by the team, the banners include former team members Ulf Samuelsson (#5), Gordie Howe (#9), Ron Francis (#10), and Kevin Dineen (#11), which were symbolically added by Hartford Wolf Pack management in honor of the players in 2006, nine years after the team departure.

Many fans have continued to follow the team after its move to North Carolina, however some have boycotted the team as former players from Hartford were traded to other teams or retired. Loyalty remains focused on the team's Hartford years, with new Whalers merchandise sales alone among the highest selling brands in the NHL as of August 2010. This continued popularity throughout the intervening years has led to many efforts to bring NHL Hockey back to Hartford by individuals such as Hartford real estate magnate and former PeoplesBank Arena operator Larry Gottesdiener and former Whalers franchise owner Howard Baldwin.

==== Efforts to attract new NHL Team ====
Rendering a new arena Hartford, CT, proposed to attract a new major league hockey team

Several efforts have been made over the years to revive NHL hockey by promoting the Hartford market for a new or relocated NHL franchise. Larry Gottesdiener, head of Northland Investment Group, has scouted for years for an NHL franchise to bring to Hartford. Northland, a firm heavily invested in Hartford real estate, jointly operated PeoplesBank Arena from 2007–10. Gottesdiener hoped to bring a new team temporarily to the PeoplesBank Arena until a modern arena could be built in a possible deal with the state. The new team would have likely been named after the Whalers, as at least some of the logos associated with the "Whalers" franchise were registered by Northland until 2009, when the registration with the patent office expired. Northland has since divested of its share in the PeoplesBank Arena, and appears to have abandoned its attempts to attract an NHL team.

Former Whalers owner Howard Baldwin has sponsored numerous events such the Whalers Reunion and Fan Fest in August 2010 featuring charitable events and appearances by former players. His company planned the Whalers Hockey Fest and Whale Bowl, a hockey festival in East Hartford, Connecticut at Rentschler Field held in February 2011. The festival featured over 20 outdoor high school and college hockey games and an AHL Outdoor Classic contest featuring the Connecticut Whale and the Providence Bruins.

==== Minor League ====
After the NHL team, the Hartford Whalers, left for North Carolina in 1997, the minor league Hartford Wolf Pack relocated from Binghamton, NY to Hartford. The Wolf Pack had a previous relationship with Hartford in the 1980s as the Whaler's AHL affiliate, the Binghamton Whalers, until they started their current affiliation with New York Rangers in 1990. In 2010, the team announced it was changing its name to the Connecticut Whale, to honor hockey tradition in Hartford started by the Whalers. The name reverted to the Wolf Pack in 2012.

=== Danbury ===
Danbury has a fairly short history of minor league hockey from mostly independent leagues (no affiliation with the NHL). Most of the teams succumbed to budget and management problems. Danbury teams played at the Danbury Ice Arena, built in 1999 and renovated in 2004 just before the Danbury Trashers began play.

The Danbury Whalers of the Federal Hockey League (FHL) were named in honor of the former Hartford Whalers NHL hockey team. The team and the FHL league have no affiliation with the NHL or any NHL franchise. The Danbury Titans replaced the Whalers in the FHL in the 2015–16 season but would also fold after two seasons

== Numbers that have been retired ==
Connecticut retired numbers
N°	Player	Team	Position	Tenure	N° Retirement	Notes
12	Ken Gernander	Hartford Wolf Pack	RW	1997–05	October 8, 2005	Head coach, 2007–2017
2	Rick Ley	Hartford Whalers	D	1972–81	December 26, 1982	
9	Gordie Howe	Hartford Whalers	RW	1977–80	February 18, 1981	
19	John McKenzie	Hartford Whalers	RW	1977–79	1979	

== Summary of franchises by city ==
=== Bridgeport ===
Name	Years active	League	Venue
Bridgeport Islanders; Bridgeport Sound Tigers (2001–2020)	2001–2026	AHL	Total Mortgage Arena
New York Sirens	2023–2024	PWHL	Total Mortgage Arena

=== Danbury ===
Name	Years active	League	Venue
Danbury Mad Hatters	2008–2009	Eastern Professional Hockey League	Danbury Ice Arena
New England Stars	2006–2007	North Eastern Hockey League	Danbury Ice Arena
Danbury Trashers	2004–2006	United Hockey League	Danbury Ice Arena
Danbury Whalers	2010–2015	Federal Hockey League	Danbury Ice Arena
Danbury Titans	2015–2017	Federal Hockey League	Danbury Ice Arena
Connecticut Whale	2019–20	Premier Hockey Federation	Danbury Ice Arena
Danbury Hat Tricks	2019–present	Federal Prospects Hockey League	Danbury Ice Arena

=== Hartford ===
Name	Years active	League	Venue
Hartford Wolf Pack; Connecticut Whale (2010–2013) (Note: Team was briefly rebranded as the "Connecticut Whale" under a marketing agreement with Howard Baldwin.)	1997–present	AHL	PeoplesBank Arena
Hartford Whalers	1975–1997	WHA (1975–1979); NHL (1979–1997)	Hartford Civic Center (Note: Except during its construction and major repairs.)

=== New Haven ===
Name	Years active	League	Venue
New Haven Knights	2000–2001	UHL	New Haven Coliseum
Beast of New Haven	1997–1999	AHL	New Haven Coliseum
New Haven Nighthawks (1972–1992); New Haven Senators (1992–93)	1972–1993	AHL	New Haven Coliseum
New Haven Blades	1954–1972	EHL	New Haven Arena
New Haven Nutmegs	1952 to 1953 (Note: The EHL League did not operate 1953–1954, so no New Haven team was fielded that season.)	EHL	New Haven Arena
New Haven Tomahawks	1951–1952	EHL	New Haven Arena
New Haven Eagles; New Haven Ramblers (1946–1950)	1926–1951	Can-Am (1926–1936); AHL (1936–1943, 1944–1950); EHL (1943–44)	New Haven Arena
