= Devin Rask =

Canadian ice hockey player

- Born: May 18, 1978 (age 48) Parkside, Saskatchewan, Canada
- Height: 5 ft 9 in (175 cm)
- Weight: 174 lb (79 kg; 12 st 6 lb)
- Position: Center
- Shot: Left
- Played for: Trenton Titans; St. John's Maple Leafs; Hannover Indians; Danbury Mad Hatters
- Playing career: 1999–2009
- Coaching career

Biographical details
- Education: Providence College

Coaching career (HC unless noted)
- 2006–2008: Wesleyan (assistant)
- 2009–2011: Connecticut (assistant)
- 2011–2019: South Kent School
- 2019–Present: Mount Saint Charles Academy

Devin Rask is a Canadian ice hockey coach and former center who was an All-American for Providence.

== Career ==
Rask was a star played in juniors, twice averaging more than point per season. After hitting the century mark in 1999, Rask began attending Providence College in the fall. While his offensive production saw a marked decline as a freshman, his scoring touch returned and he was named an All-American as a sophomore. That season he helped the Friars win 22 games, their highest total in a decade, and reach the Hockey East finals. He was named team captain for his junior season but both he and Providence declined. After a losing season, Rask returned as a senior and helped the team recover with a 4th-place finish.

After graduating, Rask played in the Toronto Maple Leafs farm system for a year before heading to Germany. He played two more years in the Oberliga (Germany's third-tier league) before retiring and beginning his coaching career. Rask's first job was as an assistant coach for Wesleyan, a position he held for 2 years. After that he came out of retirement and played a few games for Danbury Mad Hatters in their only year of existence. He was back behind the bench the following year, this time as an assistant for Connecticut. Two years later he was on the move again, this time being named ice hockey director and head coach for the South Kent School. He was with the program for over eight years before leaving to take over a similar position at Mount Saint Charles Academy.

== Statistics ==
=== Regular season and playoffs ===
			Regular Season					Playoffs
Season	Team	League	GP	G	A	Pts	PIM	GP	G	A	Pts	PIM
1994–95	Prince Albert Mintos	SMAAAHL	36	10	19	29	74	7	4	2	6	—
1995–96	Prince Albert Mintos	SMAAAHL	5	2	2	4	18	—	—	—	—	—
1995–96	Yorkton Terriers	SJHL	49	13	23	36	97	—	—	—	—	—
1996–97	Notre Dame Hounds	SJHL	65	23	35	58	92	6	3	2	5	4
1997–98	Notre Dame Hounds	SJHL	58	33	41	74	61	—	—	—	—	—
1998–99	Yorkton Terriers	SJHL	63	45	55	100	135	7	2	3	5	10
1999–00	Providence	Hockey East	38	7	14	21	18	—	—	—	—	—
2000–01	Providence	Hockey East	39	23	28	51	41	—	—	—	—	—
2001–02	Providence	Hockey East	37	16	19	35	14	—	—	—	—	—
2002–03	Providence	Hockey East	35	18	26	44	26	—	—	—	—	—
2003–04	Trenton Titans	ECHL	72	15	19	34	24	—	—	—	—	—
2003–04	St. John's Maple Leafs	AHL	1	0	0	0	0	—	—	—	—	—
2004–05	Hannover Indians	Oberliga	46	25	30	55	86	6	2	2	4	4
2005–06	Hannover Indians	Oberliga	50	27	27	54	95	9	1	5	6	10
2008–09	Danbury Mad Hatters	EPHL	3	1	1	2	2	—	—	—	—	—
SMAAAHL totals			41	12	21	33	92	7	4	2	6	—
SJHL totals			235	114	154	268	385	13	5	5	10	14
NCAA totals			149	64	87	151	99	—	—	—	—	—
Oberliga totals			96	52	57	109	181	15	3	7	10	14

== Awards and honors ==
Award	Year
All-Hockey East First Team	2000–01
AHCA East Second-Team All-American	2000–01
