= Billy Tibbetts =

American ice hockey player (born 1974)

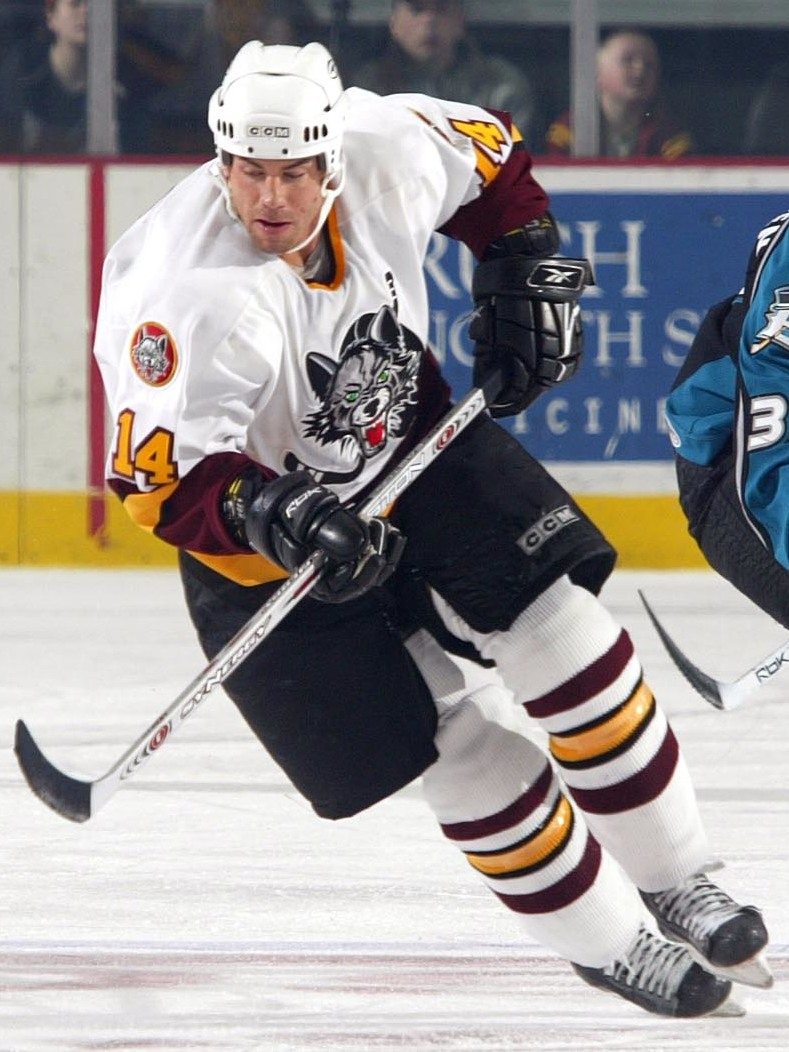
- Tibbetts with the Chicago Wolves in 2006
- Born: October 14, 1974 (age 52) Scituate, Massachusetts, U.S.
- Height: 6 ft 2 in (188 cm)
- Weight: 217 lb (98 kg; 15 st 7 lb)
- Position: Right wing
- Shot: Right
- Played for: Pittsburgh Penguins; Philadelphia Flyers; New York Rangers; HPK; HIFK; EHC Olten
- NHL draft: Undrafted
- Playing career: 1994–2012

William Thomas Tibbetts (born October 14, 1974) is an American former professional ice hockey player. He played 82 games in the National Hockey League with the Pittsburgh Penguins, Philadelphia Flyers, and New York Rangers from 2000 to 2003. The rest of his career, which lasted from 1994 to 2012, was mainly spent in the minor leagues.

== Early life ==
William Thomas Tibbetts was born on October 14, 1974, in Scituate, Massachusetts, to his parents Joe and Terry Tibbetts. His father was a graduate of Harvard University and had his own construction firm. He has two siblings a brother Nicky and a sister Alex. Tibbetts began playing hockey at the age of four and was a Boston Bruins fan growing up, having an admiration for enforcers such as Jay Miller. Tibbetts attended public school in Scituate followed by two private high schools in the area but never graduated, he went on to earn a GED later in life.

== Playing career ==
In 1992–93 Tibbetts played for the Boston Jr. Bruins of the New England Junior Hockey League (NEJHL), an independent junior circuit, where he established himself as a prospect scoring 60 goals and 80 assists 73 games. In 1993-94 Tibbetts played for multiple teams in various leagues such as the Sioux City Musketeers, Tri–City Americans, Bellingham Ice Hawks and the London Knights. During this period he scored 20 goals and 24 assists.

=== ECHL ===
Tibbetts started his career in the ECHL with the Birmingham Bulls, playing two games with the team as a 19-year-old rookie during the 1994–95 season. The following season, he signed with the Johnstown Chiefs. Tibbetts finished the season with 37 goals, 31 assists, and 68 points, ranking third on the team behind established ECHL veterans Don Parsons and Trevor Jobe. His 300 PIMs was the second highest on the team that season, finishing only behind Jason Courtemache's 363 PIMs. Because of a ruling which involved the violation of his probation, this was Tibbetts' last season of professional hockey until the year 2000.

=== Rape charge and prison ===
In 1994, Tibbetts plead guilty to rape, based on a 1992 interaction between a 17-year-old Tibbetts and a 15-year-old girl, that the convicting judge called "brutal" in nature. His sentence was suspended for 42 months. However, in 1995, while on probation for the rape case, Tibbetts was convicted of assault and battery with a dangerous weapon (a BB gun), disorderly conduct and witness intimidation. As a result, Tibbetts served 39 months in prison; the sentence on the assault and battery charges was 30 months, but it was served concurrently with the previously suspended sentence for statutory rape. As a result of the convictions, Tibbetts had to register as a sex offender and could not play games in Canada.

=== NHL ===
On August 13, 2000, Tibbetts signed a professional tryout (PTO) contract with the Pittsburgh Penguins of the NHL. He was later assigned to their AHL affiliate in Wilkes-Barre, where he scored 38 points in 38 games before being recalled by his parent club later that season. For Tibbetts to reach the NHL, even after three and a half years of jail time and adversity, Penguins owner Mario Lemieux considered this to be "a great accomplishment" and that it was "a great story". Tibbetts appeared in 29 games for the Penguins that year scoring his first NHL goal on February 21, 2001 vs. the New Jersey Devils. Tibbetts spent another partial season between Wilkes-Barre (scoring 30 points in 24 games) and Pittsburgh (scoring 5 points in 33 games) before being traded to Philadelphia. On March 17, 2002, Tibbetts was traded to the Philadelphia Flyers for defensive forward and faceoff specialist Kent Manderville.

Tibbetts' tenure with the Flyers was short lived. He played nine games with the Flyers, averaging less than seven minutes a game. Tibbetts was also suspended for two games during his short tenure for instigating a fight, which resulted in his third penalty of the night. On April 9, 2002, 23 days after he was traded to Philadelphia, Tibbetts was placed on waivers. Tibbetts "did everything he was supposed to do, which included going to anger management classes", Flyers GM Bobby Clarke said. Clarke later said that he released Tibbetts because of a "numbers game", which had Tibbetts behind five centerman and Marty Murray ready to come off the IR. Tibbetts started the 2002–03 season with the Hartford Wolfpack of the AHL. On December 16, 2002, Tibbetts signed with the New York Rangers of the National Hockey League. In 11 games with the Rangers, he went pointless with only 12 PIMs.

=== Return To ECHL ===
On October 17, 2003, Tibbetts signed with the San Diego Gulls of the ECHL, but was later assigned to two different AHL teams during the 2003–04 ECHL season. During his stint with the Gulls he scored (53 points 18 goals and 35 assists) in 40 games. On January 9, 2004, Tibbetts was recalled by the Springfield Falcons and returned to the team on January 23. Two months later, on March 20, 2004, he was loaned to the Houston Aeros. Both times he was returned to the Gulls due to "behavorial issues".

On October 5, 2004, Tibbetts re-signed with the San Diego Gulls, but spent time on the injured reserve (IR) list because of back problems. San Diego waived Tibbetts on November 12, 2004, citing unspecified violations of a zero-tolerance policy for his past behavior. Two days later, Tibbetts was claimed off waivers by the Las Vegas Wranglers of the ECHL. Tibbetts received an indefinite suspension on November 19, 2004, after being assessed a match penalty in a ECHL game at Bakersfield on November 18. This was Tibbetts' first game as a member of the Las Vegas Wranglers. Tibbetts returned to the ice on December 10 after a ten-game suspension. After receiving a fourth ejection in thirteen games, Tibbetts was placed on waivers by the Wranglers. He later was claimed by the Toledo Storm, but never played a game for them. Tibbetts declined to report to the Storm and was later traded to the Idaho Steelheads for future considerations. He played fifteen games with the Steelheads, scoring three goals with eleven assists. On March 17, 2005, Tibbetts was ejected from a game against the Louisiana IceGators for not having his fight strap tied down during a fight against IceGators forward Chris Thompson. Tibbetts later went after referee Chris Ciamaga but was restrained by three Steelheads teammates. Tibbetts earned a second game misconduct and a gross misconduct for this incident, and four days later, Tibbetts was handed a second indefinite suspension of the 2004–05 ECHL season. On March 21, 2005, Tibbetts was released from the Idaho Steelheads.

=== Minor leagues and Europe ===
In 2005–06 he started the season with the Rockford Icehogs of the UHL. On December 8, 2005, Rockford Icehogs announced that they loaned Tibbetts to the Chicago Wolves of the American Hockey League. He scored 22 goals and 20 assists in 42 games for the Wolves.

Tibbetts reported to the 2006–07 Boston Bruins training camp as part of the "Be A Bruin" promotion, a team-approved promotion which allowed one player of each position (forward, defenseman, goalie) of various leagues to take a chance at participating in a Bruins training camp. The promotion was originally intended for amateurs who wanted a shot at playing for the Boston Bruins, but because Tibbetts was a member of the Chicago Wolves at the time, his entry (submitted by his father) would be permitted. Tibbetts reported to camp on September 9, 2006, but was released on September 18. He later signed a tryout contract with HPK of the Finnish SM-liiga. After only four games with HPK, Tibbetts left the team without notice and signed with rival HIFK.

On November 7, 2007, he signed a contract with EHC Olten of the Swiss National League B

On February 18, 2009, Tibbetts signed a three-game contract with the Huntsville Havoc of the SPHL and five days later signed a contract for the remainder of the season . Tibbetts finished his tenure with 15 points in 12 games, and a suspension for two games for blindsiding Columbus Cottonmouths defenseman Kyle Lundale with a punch to the head.

After a 32-month sabbatical from professional hockey, Tibbetts resumed his playing career, with the Cape Cod Bluefins of the Federal Hockey League, signing with the team on December 3, 2011. In his first game, Tibbetts scored an empty net goal and assisted on four others in a 5–4 victory over the Danbury Whalers. Tibbetts followed up his 5-point night with a three-point game where he scored a goal and two assists. He played fifteen games with the Bluefins, scoring 40 points (10 goals and 30 assists) then retiring from professional hockey thereafter.

== Subsequent legal problems ==
Tibbetts was arrested in August 2007 for leading police on a high-speed car chase, not long after having led police on a different high speed chase earlier in 2007.

On April 27, 1994, he was given a suspended sentence of six months, 18 months probation and was fined $625 on charges of assault and battery on a police officer, disorderly conduct and intimidating a witness.

Tibbetts was arraigned again July 12, 1995, in Hingham (Mass.) District Court for assault and battery with a dangerous weapon, a BB gun. He was found guilty and sentenced to 2½ years in prison. He also was found to have violated his parole.

He was arrested early in the morning of August 13, 2007, after leading a Massachusetts State Police trooper on a high-speed chase from Scituate, MA to Abington, MA, where he crashed his 2007 BMW into a fence and a telephone pole, and fled on foot.

In 2019 he served 58 days for violating his probation, then pleaded guilty to two counts of criminal harassment against the Scituate police chief and the chief's sister, and one count each of violating a harassment prevention order, intimidating a witness and driving with a suspended license. Shortly after being released, he was arrested on new drug charges.

On March 20, 2026 Tibbetts was arrested at a Massachusetts motel for allegedly violating a protective order tied to a harassment claim.

== Post retirement ==
=== Politics ===
In 2019 Tibbetts ran for an empty Scituate select board seat, being heavily against rezoning in Scituate's Greenbush neighborhood. He lost the race to Karen Connolly, receiving 261 votes.

=== Hockey camps ===
Since 2026, Tibbetts has begun running his own hockey camp based out of Cranston, Rhode Island.

Comedy Show

Since 2026, Tibbetts has been running comedy shows at locations such as the Ming Dyansty in Marshfield Massachusetts. Fan pages such as tibsfanpage has been to these events.

== Career statistics ==
=== Regular season and playoffs ===
			Regular season					Playoffs
Season	Team	League	GP	G	A	Pts	PIM	GP	G	A	Pts	PIM
1992–93	Boston Junior Bruins	Ind	73	60	80	140	150	—	—	—	—	—
1993–94	Sioux City Musketeers	USHL	7	1	4	5	27	—	—	—	—	—
1993–94	Tri–City Americans	WHL	9	0	2	2	39	—	—	—	—	—
1993–94	Bellingham Ice Hawks	BCHL	4	2	3	5	16	—	—	—	—	—
1993–94	London Knights	OHL	14	6	6	12	49	—	—	—	—	—
1994–95	Antigonish Bulldogs	MarJHL	15	11	11	22	128	1	2	0	2	4
1994–95	Birmingham Bulls	ECHL	2	0	1	1	18	—	—	—	—	—
1995–96	Johnstown Chiefs	ECHL	58	37	31	68	300	—	—	—	—	—
2000–01	Pittsburgh Penguins	NHL	29	1	2	3	79	—	—	—	—	—
2000–01	Wilkes–Barre/Scranton Penguins	AHL	38	14	24	38	185	12	4	6	10	55
2001–02	Pittsburgh Penguins	NHL	33	1	5	6	109	—	—	—	—	—
2001–02	Wilkes–Barre/Scranton Penguins	AHL	24	13	17	30	193	—	—	—	—	—
2001–02	Philadelphia Flyers	NHL	9	0	1	1	69	—	—	—	—	—
2002–03	New York Rangers	NHL	11	0	0	0	12	—	—	—	—	—
2002–03	Hartford Wolf Pack	AHL	35	7	10	17	172	—	—	—	—	—
2003–04	San Diego Gulls	ECHL	40	18	35	53	256	—	—	—	—	—
2003–04	Springfield Falcons	AHL	6	0	2	2	25	—	—	—	—	—
2003–04	Houston Aeros	AHL	8	0	8	8	22	1	0	0	0	0
2004–05	Las Vegas Wranglers	ECHL	13	1	4	5	132	—	—	—	—	—
2004–05	San Diego Gulls	ECHL	7	4	5	9	56	—	—	—	—	—
2004–05	Idaho Steelheads	ECHL	15	3	11	14	132	—	—	—	—	—
2005–06	Rockford IceHogs	UHL	13	5	6	11	55	7	7	3	10	20
2005–06	Chicago Wolves	AHL	46	20	22	42	249	—	—	—	—	—
2006–07	HPK	SM-l	4	4	4	8	4	—	—	—	—	—
2006–07	HIFK	SM-l	15	3	8	11	24	5	1	1	2	10
2007–08	EHC Olten	SWI–2	9	7	7	14	78	—	—	—	—	—
2008–09	Danbury Mad Hatters	EPHL	3	1	4	5	9	—	—	—	—	—
2008–09	Huntsville Havoc	SPHL	12	8	7	15	30	4	1	5	6	10
2011–12	Cape Cod Bluefins	FHL	15	10	30	40	109	—	—	—	—	—
AHL totals			157	54	83	137	846	13	4	6	10	55
ECHL totals			135	63	87	150	904	—	—	—	—	—
NHL totals			82	2	8	10	269	—	—	—	—	—
