= IceCat =

IceCat may refer to:

- Open ICEcat, a multilingual open catalogue providing linked data for product datasheets, related digital assets and usage statistics
- Mohawk Valley IceCats, an NEHL team based in Utica, New York
- Norfolk IceCats, an NEHL team based in Simcoe, ON
- Worcester IceCats, an ice hockey team in the American Hockey League who played in Worcester, Massachusetts
- The club hockey team of the Arizona Wildcats
- GNU IceCat, a web browser formerly known as GNU IceWeasel, based on Mozilla Firefox
