= Hudson Valley Bears =

- City: Poughkeepsie, New York; Newburgh, New York
- League: Eastern Professional Hockey League
- Founded: 2008
- Home arena: Mid-Hudson Civic Center; Ice Time Sports Complex
- Colors: Black, gold, and blue
- Owner(s): Curtis Russell
- General manager: Phil Esposito
- Head coach: Phil Esposito
- Media: Poughkeepsie Journal

Franchise history
- 2008–2009: Hudson Valley Bears

The Hudson Valley Bears were an ice hockey team in the Eastern Professional Hockey League. They split their home games between the Mid-Hudson Civic Center in Poughkeepsie, New York and the Ice Time Sports Complex in Newburgh, New York.

== History ==
=== 2008-2009 ===
The Hudson Valley Bears were founded in 2008 as an Eastern Professional Hockey League expansion team. In October 2008, weeks before the first games were scheduled, the Copper City Chiefs and New Hampshire Freeze folded endangering the ability of the season to be played. Rather than postpone the season, a replacement team was put together and named the Hudson Valley Bears, with home games at the Mid-Hudson Civic Center in Poughkeepsie, New York and the Ice Time Sports Complex] in Newburgh, New York. The Bears' roster was drawn from a pool of nearly 100 "local guys with part-time jobs", as Jim Riggs, the league commissioner, put it.

The Bears had little success during their only season as they finished with a 3–45–1–1 record and last place, missing the playoffs by 54 points. They also finished last in attendance with average attendance 235.

== Roster ==
Goaltenders
#		Player	Pos.	Catches	Height	Weight	Place of Birth
30	(United States)	Len DiCostanzo	G	R	5' 10"	185 lbs.	Port Jefferson Station, New York, United States
33	(United States)	Vincent Januska	G	R			Chester, New York, United States
85	(Germany)	Tim Schneider	G	L	5' 7"	165 lbs	Düsseldorf, NRW, GER

Defensemen
#		Player	Pos.	Shoots	Height	Weight	Place of Birth
3	(United States)	Dan Malloy	D	L	6' 2"	215 lbs.	Stamford, Connecticut, United States
4	(United States)	Chris Sullivan	D	R	6' 3"	195 lbs.	South Windsor, Connecticut, United States
5	(United States)	Chris Clark	D	R	6' 3"	215 lbs.	Philadelphia, Pennsylvania, United States
15	(United States)	Tony Troccia	D	R			Brick, New Jersey, United States
32	(United States)	TJ Cline	D	L	6' 1"	220 lbs.	Buffalo, New York, United States
77	(United States)	Gabe Yeung	D	R	6' 5"	230 lbs.	Madison, Wisconsin, United States

Forwards
#		Player	Pos.	Shoots	Height	Weight	Place of Birth
10	(United States)	Jerry Cardinale	F	L	5' 9"	165 lbs.	Brooklyn, New York, United States
12	(United States)	Scott Horvath	F	R	6' 2"	225 lbs.	West Redding, Connecticut, United States
14	(United States)	John Geverd	F	R	5' 11"	217 lbs.	Hooksett, New Hampshire, United States
15	(United States)	Kevin Kaminski	F	R
16	(United States)	Joey Bouchard	C	L	5' 9"	240 lbs.	Deerfield, New Hampshire, United States
18	(United States)	Jeff Pozzuto	F	R	6'1"	180 lbs.	Butler, Pennsylvania, United States
18	(United States)	Tom Westfall	F	R	6' 5"	220 lbs.	Meadville, Pennsylvania, United States
19	(United States)	Scotty Estey	F	L	5' 11"	190 lbs.	Highland Falls, New York, United States
20	(United States)	Joe Morrison	F	R
21	(United States)	Devin Guy	F		6' 0"	200 lbs.	Highland Falls, New York, United States
44	(United States)	Phil Esposito	LW	L	6' 2"	235 lbs.	East Haven, Connecticut, United States
52	(United States)	Bill Blaszcyk	F	R	6' 1"	208 lbs.	Manorville, New York, United States
83	(United States)	Chris Seifert	F	L	6' 0"	180 lbs.	Fairfield, Connecticut, United States
57	(United States)	Chris O'Brien	F	L	6' 0"	180 lbs.	Watertown, MA, United States
