= Majed J. Nesheiwat Convention Center =

Multi-purpose indoor venue in Poughkeepsie, New York

Coordinates: 41.704988°N 73.929557°W

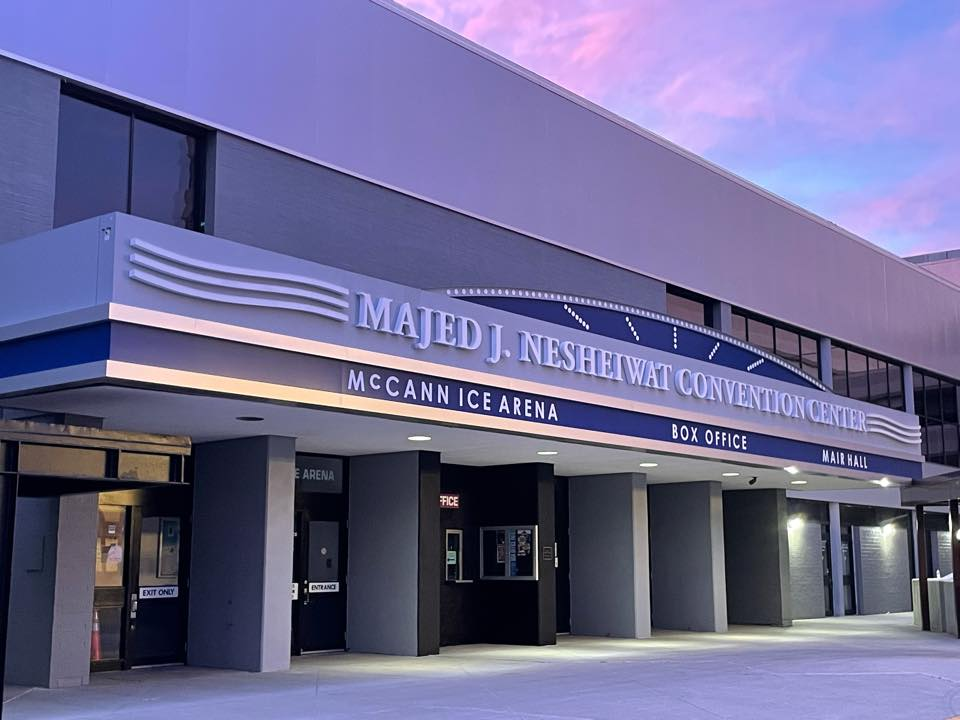
- Interactive map of Majed J. Nesheiwat Convention Center
- Former names: Mid-Hudson Civic Center (1976–2018)
- Address: 14 Civic Center Plaza; Poughkeepsie; United States
- Location: Poughkeepsie, New York
- Operator: MHCC, Inc.
- Capacity: 3,050 (Mair Hall); 1,288 (McCann Ice Arena)

Construction
- Opened: 1976

Tenants
- Poughkeepsie Panthers (NEHL) (2003–2004); Hudson Valley Bears (EPHL) (2008–2009); HC Venom (FPHL) (2025)

Majed J. Nesheiwat Convention Center (MJN Center, formerly the Mid-Hudson Civic Center) is a multi-purpose event center located in Poughkeepsie, New York, consisting of Mair Hall (a concert and convention hall) and the McCann Ice Arena (an ice skating venue). It was built in the 1970s as part of the general attempt at rehabilitation of the central district of the City of Poughkeepsie. It is located at 14 Civic Center Plaza, on a segment of what was formerly known as Market Street near the former Main Mall. The Poughkeepsie Grand Hotel, at 40 Civic Center Plaza, is adjacent on the same block and was originally designed to be constructed concurrently with the civic center and financed by Hilton, but the hotel construction was abandoned after the foundation was laid. Four years after the completion of the Mid-Hudson Civic Center, Radisson Hotels bought the hotel property and after a re-design of the original hotel plans, construction of the hotel resumed.

The MJN Nesheiwat Convention Center, a private, not-for-profit community organization, is a dual venue comprising Mair Hall and McCann Ice Arena. Mair Hall is a 15,475-square-foot (1,437.7 m^{2}) space with the capacity to host 3,050 seated spectators and large expos and trade shows.

On December 3, 2018 the Mid-Hudson Civic Center issued a press release announcing the name change of the Poughkeepsie building to the Majed J. Nesheiwat Convention Center. Majed "Mitch" Nesheiwat is a long time resident of Dutchess County, New York. He is the founder and CEO of Gas Land Petroleum, which distributes petroleum products for companies such as Exxon Mobil, Shell, Sunoco, Gulf, Citgo, Phillips 66, and Conoco.

== McCann Ice Arena ==
The McCann Ice Arena serves youth organizations, leagues and individuals for both recreational and competitive figure skating and ice hockey and offers open ice slots, group and private lessons, public skating sessions and private parties. McCann Ice Arena had briefly been the home of the Hudson Valley Bears professional hockey team and the Poughkeepsie Panthers semi-professional hockey team. McCann Ice Arena also serves as the home of Marist College Hockey. On January 2, 2025, it was announced that the HC Venom would be playing their remaining home games in the 2024-25 season at the McCann Ice Rink.

== Mair Hall ==
Mair Hall opened with a sold-out performance by Pete Seeger.

== Professional wrestling events ==
=== WWF/WWE ===
Between July 1984 and August 1986, World Wrestling Entertainment taped their internationally televised WWF Championship Wrestling at the venue. Notable wrestlers who performed at the events during this time include Hulk Hogan, Junkyard Dog, "Macho Man" Randy Savage, André the Giant, Bret Hart, Brutus Beefcake, Greg "The Hammer" Valentine, The British Bulldogs, Ricky "The Dragon" Steamboat, King Kong Bundy, Big John Studd, Ken Patera, Tito Santana, Don Muraco, The Iron Sheik, "Mr Wonderful" Paul Orndorff, Hercules Hernandez, Adrian Adonis and Rowdy Roddy Piper, who also hosted his "Piper's Pit" segment on the show. Television commentators were WWF owner Vince McMahon, who at the time was only known outside of wrestling circles as an announcer and not the company owner and "professional wrestling's only living legend" Bruno Sammartino, with Jesse "The Body" Ventura occasionally joining the duo or filling in for Sammartino. Ventura also wrestled on the show occasionally as Randy Savage's tag-team partner, usually taunting the semi-retired Sammartino and challenging him to get in the ring.

The venue was also where "Macho Man" Randy Savage, who had been billed as "the top free agent in pro wrestling", first introduced Miss Elizabeth, his then real life wife, as his chosen manager on an episode of Championship Wrestling on August 24, 1985 (taped July 30). Heel managers Bobby "The Brain" Heenan, Mr. Fuji, "Classy" Freddie Blassie, Luscious Johnny V, and "The Mouth of the South" Jimmy Hart had been "bidding" for his services in the previous months and had gathered in the ring to hear who Savage had chosen.

The venue was also where Heenan Family members Big John Studd and Ken Patera faced André the Giant and S. D. Jones in a tag team match. After knocking Jones out of the ring, Studd and Patera then double-teamed André, knocking him unconscious. Bobby Heenan then pulled a pair of scissors from his pocket which Studd used to cut The Giants long hair, with Vince McMahon claiming in commentary that they were raping André of his dignity. While it shocked the audience, in reality André had agreed to the haircut prior to the match as part of his ongoing feud with the 6'10" (208 cm) Studd over who was the true giant in professional wrestling.

The only title change at the Civic Center during WWF Championship Wrestling tapings was on June 17, 1985 when The U.S. Express (Mike Rotundo and Barry Windham) defeated "The Foreign Legion" (The Iron Sheik and Nikolai Volkoff), regaining the WWF Tag Team Championship they had lost to the pair at Wrestlemania on March 31, 1985. The Mid Hudson Civic Center has also host a handful of episodes of Monday Night Raw between 1993 and 1995; the March 15, 1993 episode was the first to be taped outside New York City's Manhattan Center.

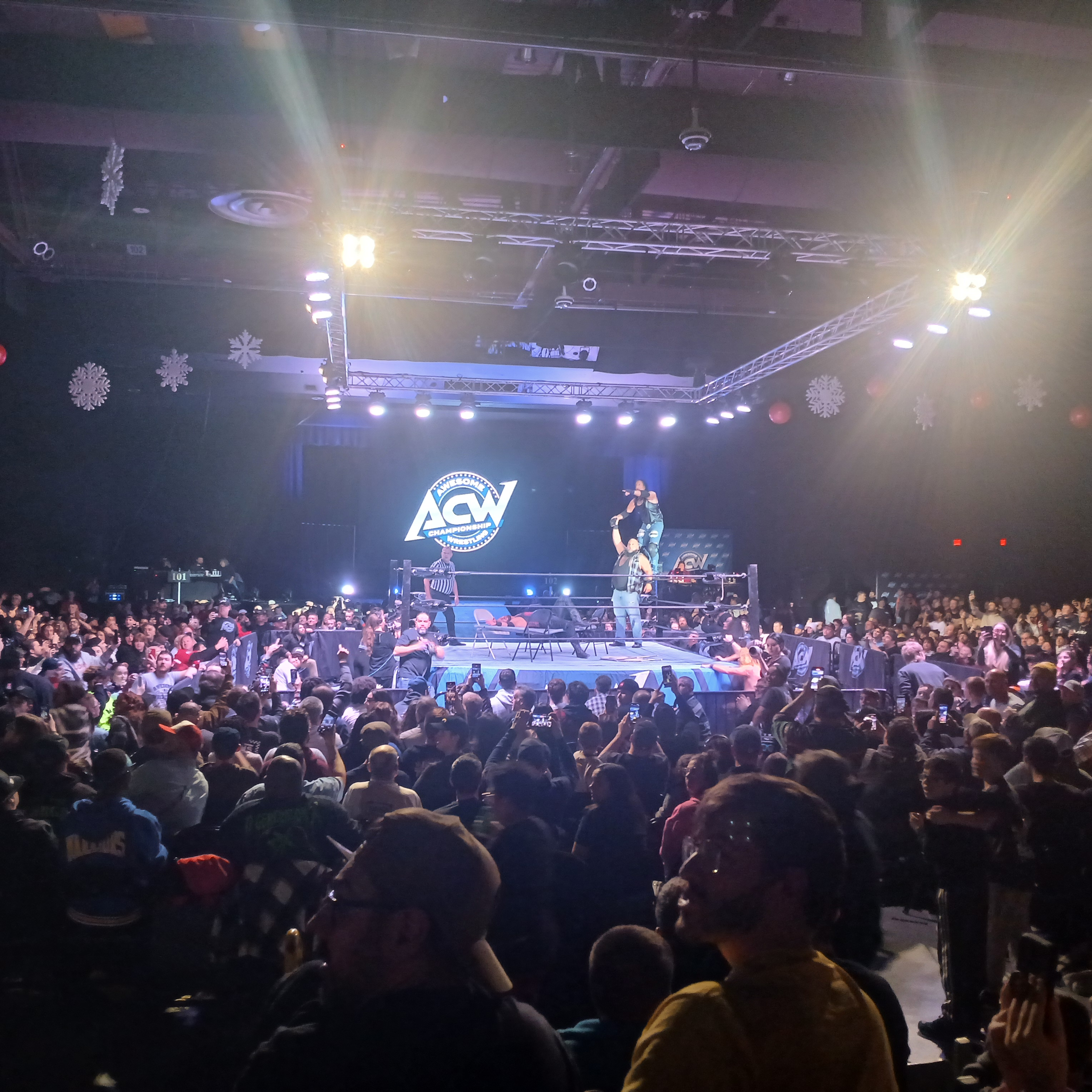
ACW Wrestling at MJN Convention Center in 2026

At the final taping of Championship Wrestling on August 5, 1986 (aired August 30), Harley Race was crowned the "King of Wrestling" after winning the 1986 King of the Ring tournament.

=== Extreme Championship Wrestling ===
ECW hosted their Hardcore Heaven pay-per-view event at the venue on May 16, 1999.

=== Other wrestling promotions ===
Total Nonstop Action Wrestling taped their pay-per view event TNA One Night Only: #OldSchool at the venue on December 30, 2013.

Impact Wrestling held their Rebellion pay-per view event at the venue on April 23, 2022.

In 2026, Awesome Championship Wrestling held events at the facility.

== Notable performances ==
Kiss performed at the venue on November 28, 1984, as part of their Animalize World Tour. This was the first show with lead guitarist, Mark St. John, playing the entire show. St. John only performed three shows (two in full) with the group before being permanently replaced by Bruce Kulick.

IRSL Roller Derby action was skated here in April 1986, featuring the San Francisco Bay Bombers vs. The Southern Stars. Roller Derby athletes Ann Calvello & Joan Weston squared off against each other.

Anthrax, Exodus and Helloween performed at the venue on May 12, 1989. It was the last show of the Headbangers Ball Tour.

System of a Down, Mr. Bungle, Incubus, and Puya performed on February 18, 2000 as part of the SnoCore Tour.
