= Shane Willis =

Canadian ice hockey player (born 1977)

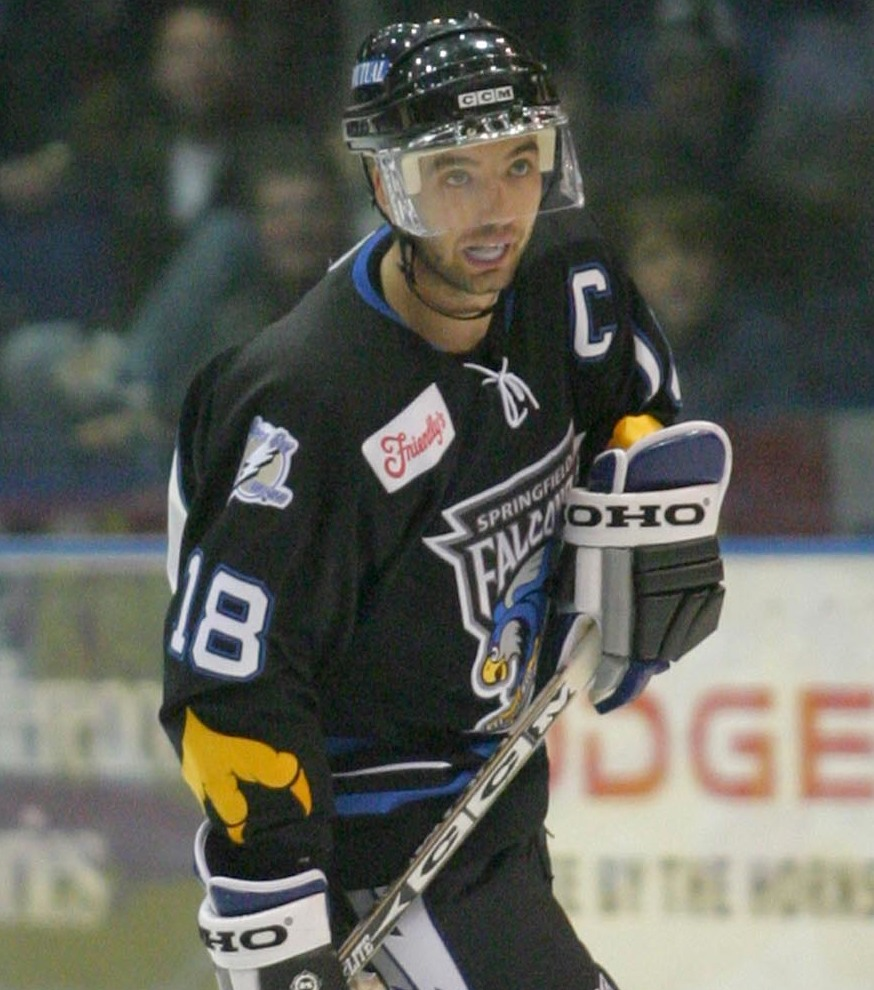
- Willis with the Springfield Falcons in 2004
- Born: June 13, 1977 (age 49) Edmonton, Alberta, Canada
- Height: 6 ft 1 in (185 cm)
- Weight: 195 lb (88 kg; 13 st 13 lb)
- Position: Right wing
- Shot: Right
- Played for: Carolina Hurricanes; Tampa Bay Lightning
- NHL draft: 56th overall, 1995; Tampa Bay Lightning; 88th overall, 1997; Carolina Hurricanes
- Playing career: 1998–2009

Shane Willis (born June 13, 1977) is a Canadian former professional ice hockey right winger. Willis was born in Edmonton, Alberta, but grew up in Sylvan Lake, Alberta.

== Career ==
Willis was originally drafted by Tampa Bay 56th overall in the 1995 NHL Entry Draft, but unable to come to terms, he re-entered the draft and was selected 88th overall by the Carolina Hurricanes in the 1997 NHL Entry Draft. Willis was drafted from the Western Hockey League where he played for the Prince Albert Raiders and Lethbridge Hurricanes.

In 1999, his first full professional season, Willis won the Dudley "Red" Garrett Memorial Award as the top rookie of the American Hockey League, while playing for the Beast of New Haven. Shane made his NHL debut for the Hurricanes in the 1998–99 before breaking out in the 2000–01 season, enjoying career highs of 20 goals and 24 assists.

Carolina qualified for the postseason in 2001 and faced the New Jersey Devils in the conference quarterfinals. Late in game 2, Willis was leveled by a Scott Stevens hit. He sat out the rest of the series. Combined with another hit the following season, an elbow to the face by Bryan Marchment, the injuries would hinder Willis' game, who would never score as much as in his rookie season.

In 2005–06, he played in Europe for Davos in Switzerland and for Linköpings HC in Sweden. He returned to North America for the 2006–07 season, signing with the Carolina Hurricanes on July 18, 2006. However, Willis spent the year playing with the Hurricanes affiliate, the Albany River Rats.

On July 5, 2007, Willis signed a one-year contract with the Nashville Predators but after his first game with affiliate, the Milwaukee Admirals, he was ruled out for the season.

In the 2008–09 season Willis had signed a tryout contract with the Columbus Blue Jackets for the 2008–09 season but was subsequently released on September 25, 2008. On January 13, 2009, Shane was signed by the Wheeling Nailers of the ECHL to a player/coach role. After one game Willis was then signed by former team the Springfield Falcons of the AHL to a professional try-out contract on January 16, 2009. Willis has played 174 career NHL games, scoring 31 goals and 43 assists for 74 points.

On September 8, 2011, Willis was hired as the Youth and Amateur Hockey Coordinator for the Carolina Hurricanes. He also serves as a television analyst for locally-broadcast Hurricanes games.

== Awards and achievements ==
- 1996–97 WHL East First All-Star Team
- 1997–98 WHL East First All-Star Team
- 1998–99 AHL All-Rookie Team
- 1998–99 AHL First All-Star Team
- 1998–99 AHL Dudley "Red" Garrett Memorial Award
- 2000–01 NHL All-Rookie Team

== Career statistics ==
=== Regular season and playoffs ===
			Regular season					Playoffs
Season	Team	League	GP	G	A	Pts	PIM	GP	G	A	Pts	PIM
1993–94	Red Deer Royals AAA	AMHL	34	40	26	66	103	—	—	—	—	—
1994–95	Prince Albert Raiders	WHL	65	24	19	43	38	13	3	4	7	6
1995–96	Prince Albert Raiders	WHL	69	41	40	81	47	18	11	10	21	18
1996–97	Prince Albert Raiders	WHL	41	34	22	56	63	—	—	—	—	—
1996–97	Lethbridge Hurricanes	WHL	26	22	17	39	24	19	13	11	24	20
1997–98	Lethbridge Hurricanes	WHL	64	58	54	112	73	4	2	3	5	6
1997–98	Beast of New Haven	AHL	1	0	1	1	2	—	—	—	—	—
1998–99	Carolina Hurricanes	NHL	7	0	0	0	0	—	—	—	—	—
1998–99	Beast of New Haven	AHL	73	31	50	81	49	—	—	—	—	—
1999–00	Cincinnati Cyclones	IHL	80	35	25	60	64	11	5	3	8	8
1999–00	Carolina Hurricanes	NHL	2	0	0	0	0	—	—	—	—	—
2000–01	Carolina Hurricanes	NHL	73	20	24	44	45	2	0	0	0	0
2001–02	Carolina Hurricanes	NHL	59	7	10	17	24	—	—	—	—	—
2001–02	Tampa Bay Lightning	NHL	21	4	3	7	6	—	—	—	—	—
2002–03	Springfield Falcons	AHL	56	16	16	32	26	6	4	2	6	4
2003–04	Hershey Bears	AHL	55	27	21	48	71	—	—	—	—	—
2003–04	Tampa Bay Lightning	NHL	12	0	6	6	2	—	—	—	—	—
2004–05	Springfield Falcons	AHL	58	18	16	34	29	—	—	—	—	—
2005–06	HC Davos	NLA	32	5	15	20	47	—	—	—	—	—
2005–06	Linköpings HC	SEL	6	0	1	1	4	13	6	5	11	10
2006–07	Albany River Rats	AHL	43	20	23	43	23	5	3	1	4	0
2007–08	Milwaukee Admirals	AHL	1	0	0	0	0	—	—	—	—	—
2008–09	Springfield Falcons	AHL	32	5	10	15	8	—	—	—	—	—
AHL totals			319	117	136	253	208	11	7	3	10	4
NHL totals			174	31	43	74	77	2	0	0	0	0

=== International ===
Year	Team	Event	GP	G	A	Pts	PIM
1997	Canada	WJC	7	0	0	0	0
Junior totals			7	0	0	0	0
