= Yvan Chasle =

Canadian ice hockey player (1932–1987)

- Born: November 13, 1932 Valleyfield, Quebec, Canada
- Died: August 15, 1987 (aged 54)
- Height: 5 ft 9 in (175 cm)
- Weight: 172 lb (78 kg; 12 st 4 lb)
- Position: Left wing
- Shot: Left
- Played for: New Haven Blades
- Playing career: 1947–1966

Yvan Chasle (November 13, 1932 – August 15, 1987) was a Canadian professional hockey player who played 591 games in the Eastern Hockey League with the New Haven Blades.
