= Ron Duguay =

Canadian ice hockey player and coach (1957–2026)

- Duguay in 2013
- Born: July 6, 1957 Sudbury, Ontario, Canada
- Died: October 22, 2026 (aged 69) Ponte Vedra Beach, Florida, U.S.
- Height: 6 ft 2 in (188 cm)
- Weight: 200 lb (91 kg; 14 st 4 lb)
- Position: Centre
- Shot: Right
- Played for: New York Rangers; Detroit Red Wings; Pittsburgh Penguins; Los Angeles Kings; Mannheim ERC
- National team: Canada
- NHL draft: 13th overall, 1977; New York Rangers
- WHA draft: 3rd overall, 1976; Winnipeg Jets
- Playing career: 1977–1989

Ronald Duguay (July 6, 1957 – October 22, 2026) was a Canadian professional ice hockey player and coach who played 12 seasons in the National Hockey League (NHL) from 1977 through 1989, and served four seasons as a minor league coach. As a player, he played in the 1979 Stanley Cup Final with the New York Rangers.

Duguay appeared as an in-studio analyst during MSG Network's coverage of the New York Rangers from 2007 to 2018. He was born in Sudbury, Ontario, and as a child resided in Val Caron, Ontario. Duguay played junior ice hockey for the hometown Sudbury Wolves of the Ontario Major Junior Hockey League (OMJHL).

== Junior career ==
Duguay played for his hometown Sudbury Wolves of the Ontario Major Junior Hockey League (OMJHL) throughout his entire junior career spanning from 1973 to 1977. He was a very valuable player for the Wolves and one of the team's top scorers. He recorded 134 points in the 1975–76 OMJHL season, which helped the team win the Hamilton Spectator Trophy as the best team in the regular season and make the league finals where they lost to the Hamilton Fincups in six games.

He was selected to the Canada junior team for the 1977 World Junior Championships where he recorded one goal and four assists in five games as Canada finished in second place.

== NHL career ==
Duguay was drafted 13th overall by the New York Rangers in the 1977 NHL amateur draft. He played 864 career NHL games, scoring 274 goals and helped with 346 assists for 620 points as is displayed below in his CAREER STATISTICS section.

=== New York Rangers ===
After being drafted in 1977, Duguay made the jump directly from junior ice hockey to the NHL, with 20 goals in his rookie year. Duguay played his first six seasons in New York, where he was known as much for his long hair and flashy behaviour as he was for his play on the ice.

With the Rangers, Duguay set a team record, for the fastest goal at the start of a game, at 9 seconds, on April 6, 1980, against the Philadelphia Flyers. Suffering injuries, his production did not progress as hoped, but after playing for Team Canada in the 1981 Canada Cup, his play improved, and in 1981–82, he led the Rangers in scoring with 40 goals. That same season, he played in the NHL All-Star Game, representing the Rangers on the Wales Conference squad. In 1982–83, Duguay's numbers dropped, and he only scored 19 goals. Rangers coach Herb Brooks clashed with Duguay over his play and popularity in New York's night life, and on June 13, 1983, Duguay, Eddie Mio and Ed Johnstone were traded to the Detroit Red Wings in exchange for Willie Huber, Mark Osborne and Mike Blaisdell.

During Duguay's time with the Rangers, he took part in some of team president Sonny Werblin's schemes to make the Rangers more hip and visible in disco-era New York City. This includes singing on "Hockey Sock Rock", written by Alan Thicke. The song featured vocals by Duguay, Phil Esposito, Pat Hickey, Dave Maloney and John Davidson. It was released as a 45, as Platinum Records 1217–75 in 1979.

=== Detroit Red Wings ===
Playing in Detroit, Duguay's career was revitalized, and in 1983–84 he was third on the Red Wings with 33 goals, and second on the team with 47 assists, which placed him third overall on the team for points, with 80. In 1984–85 he was second on the Red Wings in all three categories, with 38 goals, 51 assists and 89 total points, the best offensive season of his career. At the trade deadline in 1985–86 Duguay was traded to the Pittsburgh Penguins for Doug Shedden.

=== Pittsburgh Penguins ===
Duguay played parts of only two seasons in Pittsburgh, and his production was never as good again as it had been in New York or Detroit. On January 21, 1987, Pittsburgh traded Duguay to his original team, the Rangers, in exchange for Chris Kontos, reuniting Duguay with former teammate, and then-Rangers general manager, Phil Esposito.

=== Return to the Rangers ===
Duguay re-signed with the Rangers in the summer of 1987.

It was towards the end of his second stint with the Rangers that Duguay was sent to the minors for the first time, playing two games with the Colorado Rangers of the International Hockey League (IHL).

=== Los Angeles Kings ===
After briefly returning to the Rangers, Duguay finished his NHL career with the Los Angeles Kings in 1988–89. Attempted comebacks with the Toronto Maple Leafs in 1990, as well as with the Tampa Bay Lightning, where Phil Esposito was the general manager in 1992, were not successful.

== Post-NHL career ==
=== San Diego Gulls ===
Duguay's career continued in the minor leagues for a few years after his final NHL season. He played 22 games in Europe with Mannheim ERC of the German Bundesliga during the 1989–90 season, then returned to the United States where he played two seasons in the IHL with the San Diego Gulls. Following the 1991–92 season he retired, but three years later resumed playing, again, for the new incarnation of the San Diego Gulls, who were now members of the West Coast Hockey League (WCHL). Duguay explained that he was inspired to return to playing to help the then injury-riddled team; he also said that he wanted his children, who had been too young to see him play in the NHL, to see him in action.

He finished the 1995–96 season with the Gulls, recording eight goals and nine assists in 12 games. Over the next two seasons, Duguay played in just five games for the Gulls. In 1998–99, he joined to the Jacksonville Lizard Kings of the (East Coast Hockey League), but skated in just one game before commencing his second retirement.

=== Jacksonville Barracudas ===
In 2003, he joined the Jacksonville Barracudas, then playing in the Atlantic Coast Hockey League (ACHL). Duguay played six games as a Barracudas forward, then took over as the team's head coach. In the 2003–04 season Duguay led the Barracudas, now playing in the World Hockey Association 2, to the league's best record and a playoff championship. In 2004, the Barracudas joined the newly-formed Southern Professional Hockey League (SPHL). With Duguay as coach, the Barracudas' overall record over parts of three seasons was 92–92–0–3 with a 6–3 playoff record. Duguay resigned as coach after an unsuccessful 2005–06 season, in which more than 50 different players left the team as it finished with a 15–39–0–2 record. Upon the occasion of his resignation, he told the Florida Times-Union that he was "tired."

== Broadcasting career ==
From 2007 to 2018, Duguay was an analyst for MSG Network's television coverage of New York Rangers games, also appearing regularly on MSG's weekly Hockey Night Live! program. Duguay's contract with MSG expired in 2018 and was not renewed.

On March 21 and 22, 2009, nearly six years after playing his final professional game, Duguay played two games in the Eastern Professional Hockey League (EPHL), one game each with the Brooklyn Aces and the Jersey Rockhoppers, to raise money for the Garden of Dreams Foundation, a nonprofit organization associated with Madison Square Garden. Duguay signed a waiver and played his game with the Brooklyn Aces without a helmet, which allowed his hair to flow free as it did when he played in the NHL. With 37 seconds left in regulation, he assisted on the game-tying goal, but the Aces lost 4–3 in overtime.

In 2009, Duguay competed in the first season of the Battle of the Blades skating competition on CBC Television, partnered with Barbara Underhill. The charity he skated for was World Vision Canada.

On December 31, 2011, Duguay participated in the 2012 Winter Classic Alumni game pitting legends of the Rangers against the legends of the Philadelphia Flyers.

== Legacy ==
The Sudbury Wolves have retired his sweater.

In the 2009 book 100 Ranger Greats, the authors ranked Duguay at no. 49 all-time of the 901 New York Rangers who had played during the team's first 82 seasons.

== Personal life and death ==
Duguay grew up in Carol Richard Park in the township of Valley East, also known as Vallée-Est, now part of Greater Sudbury. He played at the Centennial Arena in Hanmer.

In the NHL, Duguay was noted for his long curly hair, which would blow behind him as he skated without a helmet. He and teammates Phil Esposito, Dave Maloney and Anders Hedberg appeared in a TV commercial for Sasson Jeans.

On December 1, 1983, Duguay married California model Robin Bobo. The couple had two daughters before their divorce. In the 1990s, he married former fashion model Kim Alexis. After marrying Alexis, Duguay moved to Ponte Vedra Beach, Florida, and the couple had a son, Noah (born 1994). They divorced in 2016.

In 2022, Slate and other publications referred to him as the "reported beau" of former Alaska governor and 2008 vice presidential candidate Sarah Palin. In February 2022, Duguay confirmed that they were dating. In January 2022, he was seen dining outdoors with Palin at Elio's on Second Avenue on the Upper East Side of Manhattan. Palin had recently tested positive for COVID-19. A photographer was allegedly assaulted by Duguay after questioning the risk of being in Palin’s company following her positive diagnosis.

In February 2026, Duguay's family announced that he had been diagnosed with stage IV colon cancer in 2024.

Duguay died on October 22, 2026, at the age of 69.

== Career statistics ==
=== Regular season and playoffs ===
			Regular season					Playoffs
Season	Team	League	GP	G	A	Pts	PIM	GP	G	A	Pts	PIM
1973–74	Sudbury Wolves	OHA	59	20	20	40	73	4	0	3	3	4
1974–75	Sudbury Wolves	OMJHL	64	26	52	78	43	15	11	6	17	19
1975–76	Sudbury Wolves	OMJHL	61	42	92	134	101	17	11	9	20	37
1976–77	Sudbury Wolves	OMJHL	61	43	66	109	109	6	4	3	7	5
1977–78	New York Rangers	NHL	71	20	20	40	43	3	1	1	2	2
1978–79	New York Rangers	NHL	79	27	36	63	35	18	5	4	9	11
1979–80	New York Rangers	NHL	73	28	22	50	37	9	5	2	7	11
1980–81	New York Rangers	NHL	50	17	21	38	83	14	8	9	17	16
1981–82	New York Rangers	NHL	72	40	36	76	82	10	5	1	6	31
1982–83	New York Rangers	NHL	72	19	25	44	58	9	2	2	4	28
1983–84	Detroit Red Wings	NHL	80	33	47	80	34	4	2	3	5	2
1984–85	Detroit Red Wings	NHL	80	38	51	89	51	3	1	0	1	7
1985–86	Detroit Red Wings	NHL	67	19	29	48	26	—	—	—	—	—
1985–86	Pittsburgh Penguins	NHL	13	6	7	13	6	—	—	—	—	—
1986–87	Pittsburgh Penguins	NHL	40	5	13	18	30	—	—	—	—	—
1986–87	New York Rangers	NHL	34	9	12	21	9	6	2	0	2	4
1987–88	New York Rangers	NHL	44	4	4	8	23	—	—	—	—	—
1987–88	Colorado Rangers	IHL	2	0	0	0	0	—	—	—	—	—
1987–88	Los Angeles Kings	NHL	15	2	6	8	17	2	0	0	0	0
1988–89	Los Angeles Kings	NHL	70	7	17	24	48	11	0	0	0	6
1989–90	Mannheimer ERC	GER	22	11	7	18	38	3	0	1	1	20
1990–91	San Diego Gulls	IHL	51	15	24	39	87	—	—	—	—	—
1991–92	San Diego Gulls	IHL	60	18	18	36	32	4	0	1	1	0
1995–96	San Diego Gulls	WCHL	12	8	9	17	10	7	0	2	2	2
1996–97	San Diego Gulls	WCHL	2	1	1	2	0	—	—	—	—	—
1997–98	San Diego Gulls	WCHL	3	0	3	3	2	—	—	—	—	—
1998–99	Jacksonville Lizard Kings	ECHL	1	0	0	0	0	—	—	—	—	—
2002–03	Jacksonville Barracudas	ACHL	6	1	3	4	2	—	—	—	—	—
2008–09	Brooklyn Aces	EPHL	1	0	1	1	0	—	—	—	—	—
2008–09	Jersey Rockhoppers	EPHL	1	0	0	0	0	—	—	—	—	—
NHL totals			860	274	346	620	582	89	31	22	53	118

=== International ===
Year	Team	Event	GP	G	A	Pts	PIM
1977	Canada	WJC	5	1	4	5	11
1981	Canada	CC	7	0	2	2	6
Junior totals			5	1	4	5	11
Senior totals			7	0	2	2	6

Preceded by Thomas Gradin	Winnipeg Jets first-round draft pick 1976	Succeeded by Miles Zaharko
Preceded by Lucien DeBlois	New York Rangers first-round draft pick 1977	Succeeded by Doug Sulliman
