= Colton Orr =

Canadian ice hockey player (born 1982)

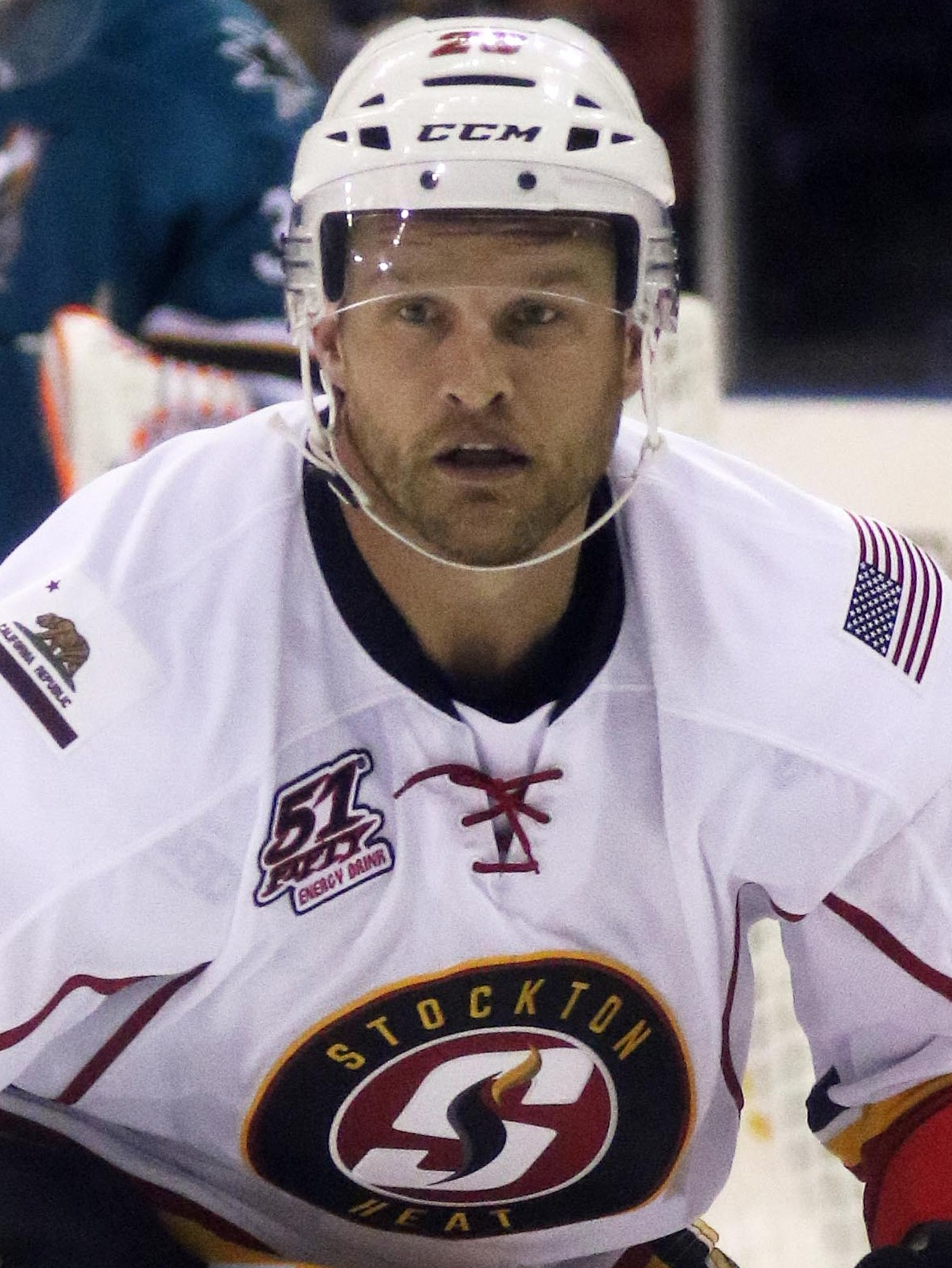
- Orr with the Stockton Heat in 2015
- Born: March 3, 1982 (age 44) Winnipeg, Manitoba, Canada
- Height: 6 ft 3 in (191 cm)
- Weight: 222 lb (101 kg; 15 st 12 lb)
- Position: Right wing
- Shot: Right
- Played for: Boston Bruins; New York Rangers; Toronto Maple Leafs
- NHL draft: Undrafted
- Playing career: 2003–2016

Colton Douglas Orr (born March 3, 1982) is a Canadian former professional ice hockey player. Having played nearly 500 games in the National Hockey League (NHL), Orr was known as an enforcer for his physical style of play and for regularly fighting.

In 2019, he was named the head coach of the Connecticut Whale in the Premier Hockey Federation.

== Playing career ==
Born and raised in Winnipeg, Manitoba, Orr played junior hockey for the Swift Current Broncos, Kamloops Blazers and Regina Pats in Western Hockey League (WHL). Orr went undrafted and signed as a free agent with the Boston Bruins. He played his first NHL game against the Washington Capitals, the only game he played in the 2003–04 season. He played most of the 2003–04 season, as well as the following, lockout-cancelled 2004–05 season with the Providence Bruins of the American Hockey League (AHL), playing 125 games, scoring 12 points and recording 536 penalty minutes.

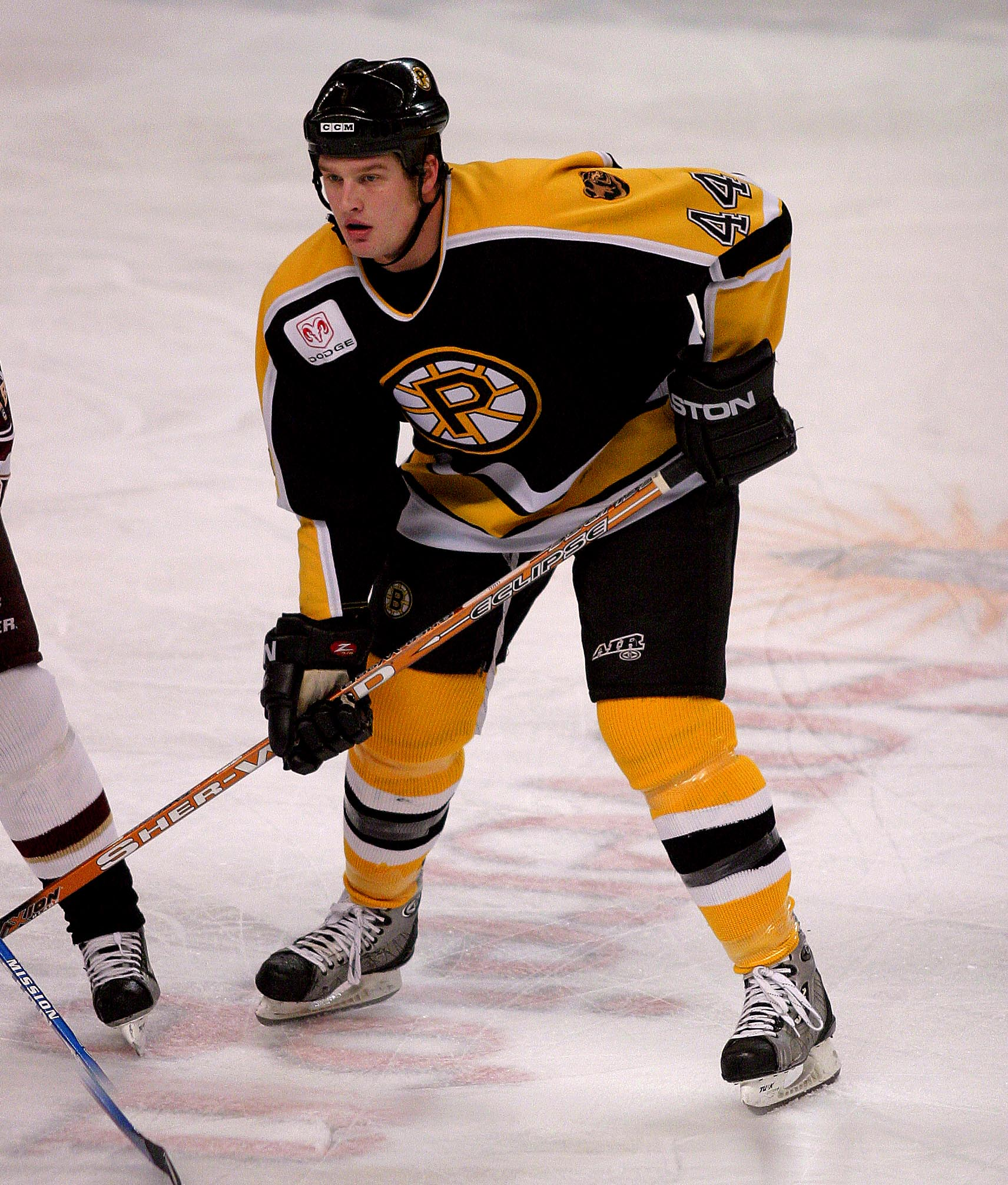
Orr with the Providence Bruins in 2004

Orr played as regular early in the 2005–06 season with the Bruins, but was shortly waived, where on November 29, 2005, the New York Rangers claimed him off waivers. He scored his first NHL point in 15 games with the Rangers, as well as dressing for one Stanley Cup playoff game against the New Jersey Devils.

Orr saw his playing time increase over three consecutive seasons in New York, dressing in 53 games in 2006–07, 74 games in 2007–08 and a full 82-game season in 2008–09. On December 31, 2006, Orr was suspended for five games by the NHL for a cross check to the face of Washington Capitals' Alexander Ovechkin in the third period of a December 30 game at Madison Square Garden. Ovechkin was uninjured, but NHL Senior Vice President and Director of Hockey Operations Colin Campbell termed Orr's infraction "reckless." Later in the season, Orr scored his first NHL goal in a February 9, 2007, game against the Tampa Bay Lightning's Johan Holmqvist, adding four more goals with the Rangers along with 478 penalty minutes in his stint in New York.

On July 1, 2009, Orr signed a four-year, $4 million contract as a free agent with the Toronto Maple Leafs. Orr would finish the season with career highs in penalty minutes (239) whilst adding four goals and six points.

His next year with the Maple Leafs was cut short after suffering a concussion in a fight with Anaheim Ducks' enforcer George Parros. Orr was out for the year and finished the season with 46 games, two goals and 128 penalty minutes.

Orr was declared ready to play at the start of the 2011–12 season, but saw a dramatically-reduced role with Toronto, playing only five games, scoring one goal and getting into one fight. On January 4, 2012, Orr was placed on waivers by the Maple Leafs, with only one-and-a-half years remaining on his contract. He was assigned to the Toronto Marlies of the AHL the next day. Orr played 26 games with the Marlies, scoring one goal and adding 46 penalty minutes.

Orr played in 44 of 48 games in the lockout-shortened 2012–13 season with Toronto, scoring one goal and adding three assists while leading the NHL in penalty minutes, with 155. He also played in all seven of the Maple Leafs' 2013 playoff games against his former team, the Boston Bruins.

On June 13, 2013, the Maple Leafs re-signed Orr to a two-year contract extension worth $1.85 million. On October 1, 2013, while playing for Toronto in their home opener against the Montreal Canadiens, Orr engaged once again with George Parros, now of the Habs, in the third period. Parros lost his balance and fell headfirst to the ice, where he was subsequently taken off on a stretcher and later diagnosed with a concussion.

Orr failed to make the Maple Leafs' roster out of training camp for the 2014–15 season and was assigned to the Toronto Marlies after clearing waivers. However, he was called up on April 9, 2015, to play in the last game of the season on April 11, as appreciation for his services.

On October 3, 2015, Orr signed a contract to play in the American Hockey League for the Stockton Heat, the farm team for the Calgary Flames. Over the duration of the 2015–16 season, Orr played in just ten regular season games. With the diminishing role of enforcers, at season's end, Orr announced his retirement from professional hockey on April 28, 2016.

== Coaching career ==
On May 14, 2019, the Danbury Colonials of the Tier III junior level North American 3 Hockey League announced that Orr had joined the ownership group and would serve as the organization's managing partner.

In September 2019, the PHF's Connecticut Whale named Colton Orr their new head coach. The Whale also play home games at the Danbury Ice Arena. In his first season as coach, the Whale went 2-20-2, but were able to defeat the Buffalo Beauts in the first round of the playoffs.

Following the termination of the PHF, Orr joined PWHL New York as an assistant coach.

In August, 2024, Orr became the head coach of the boys varsity hockey team at The Harvey School, in Katonah, NY.

== Personal life ==
Orr has been married to wife Sabrina (née Gecaj) since 2009 and has a daughter named Charlotte. Orr is not related to Bobby Orr, though the Hall of Famer has served as his agent.

During the 2001 Canada Games Colton Orr represented Manitoba as a soccer goalkeeper.

== Career statistics ==
Bold indicates led league

			Regular season					Playoffs
Season	Team	League	GP	G	A	Pts	PIM	GP	G	A	Pts	PIM
1998–99	St. Boniface Saints	MJHL	54	7	5	12	280	—	—	—	—	—
1998–99	Swift Current Broncos	WHL	2	0	0	0	0	—	—	—	—	—
1999–2000	Swift Current Broncos	WHL	61	3	2	5	130	12	1	0	1	25
2000–01	Swift Current Broncos	WHL	19	0	4	4	67	—	—	—	—	—
2000–01	Kamloops Blazers	WHL	41	8	1	9	179	3	0	0	0	20
2001–02	Kamloops Blazers	WHL	1	0	0	0	7	2	0	0	0	2
2002–03	Kamloops Blazers	WHL	3	2	0	2	17	—	—	—	—	—
2002–03	Regina Pats	WHL	37	6	2	8	170	3	0	0	0	19
2002–03	Providence Bruins	AHL	1	0	0	0	7	—	—	—	—	—
2003–04	Providence Bruins	AHL	64	1	4	5	257	2	0	0	0	9
2003–04	Boston Bruins	NHL	1	0	0	0	0	—	—	—	—	—
2004–05	Providence Bruins	AHL	61	1	6	7	279	17	1	0	1	44
2005–06	Boston Bruins	NHL	20	0	0	0	27	—	—	—	—	—
2005–06	New York Rangers	NHL	15	0	1	1	44	1	0	0	0	2
2006–07	New York Rangers	NHL	53	2	1	3	126	4	0	0	0	12
2007–08	New York Rangers	NHL	74	1	1	2	159	2	0	0	0	0
2008–09	New York Rangers	NHL	82	1	4	5	193	5	0	0	0	16
2009–10	Toronto Maple Leafs	NHL	82	4	2	6	239	—	—	—	—	—
2010–11	Toronto Maple Leafs	NHL	46	2	0	2	128	—	—	—	—	—
2011–12	Toronto Maple Leafs	NHL	5	1	0	1	5	—	—	—	—	—
2011–12	Toronto Marlies	AHL	26	1	0	1	46	8	0	0	0	9
2012–13	Toronto Maple Leafs	NHL	44	1	3	4	**155**	7	0	0	0	18
2013–14	Toronto Maple Leafs	NHL	54	0	0	0	110	—	—	—	—	—
2014–15	Toronto Marlies	AHL	14	0	0	0	4	—	—	—	—	—
2014–15	Toronto Maple Leafs	NHL	1	0	0	0	0	—	—	—	—	—
2015–16	Stockton Heat	AHL	10	0	0	0	15	—	—	—	—	—
AHL totals			176	3	10	13	608	27	1	0	1	62
NHL totals			477	12	12	24	1186	19	0	0	0	48
