= Hockey Night Live! =

American sports talk show

- Starring: Al Trautwig, Steve Valiquette, E.J. Hradek, John MacLean, Ron Duguay, Dave Maloney, Stan Fischler and Bill Pidto
- Country of origin: United States

Original release
- Network: MSG Network

Related
- MSG, NY

Hockey Night Live was a current events sports talk show about NHL hockey broadcast on MSG Network. Its main host, Al Trautwig, was joined by a panel that includes Steve Valiquette, Ron Duguay, Dave Maloney, Butch Goring, John MacLean, and E.J. Hradek, with contributions from Stan Fischler and John Giannone. Bill Pidto served as panel moderator and host when Trautwig was on assignment or unavailable.

The program primarily provided insight into the four NHL teams for which MSG held broadcast rights: the Buffalo Sabres, New York Islanders, New Jersey Devils, and MSG-owned New York Rangers. Hockey-related topics of broad importance were occasionally discussed.

From its inception until February 2016, the show was broadcast on Saturdays following the local hockey game. On February 4, 2016, the show became part of MSG Network's Thursday Night Hockey program, although the move did not guarantee the same previous local time slot.
