= Danbury Jr. Hat Tricks (NA3HL) =

- City: Danbury, Connecticut
- League: North American 3 Hockey League
- Division: East
- Founded: 2014
- Folded: 2024
- Home arena: Danbury Ice Arena
- Owner(s): DP 110, LLC
- General manager: Matt Voity (GM); Billy McCreary (President of Hockey Operations)
- Head coach: Tyler Noseworthy (NA3HL)
- Website: NA3HL's Jr. Hat Tricks

Franchise history
- 2014–2017: Lockport Express
- 2017–2019: Niagara Falls PowerHawks
- 2019–2020: Danbury Colonials
- 2020–2021: Springfield Jr. Hat Tricks
- 2021–2024: Danbury Jr. Hat Tricks

The Danbury Jr. Hat Tricks were a Tier III junior ice hockey team playing in the North American 3 Hockey League (NA3HL). The organization currently operates a team in the Tier II North American Hockey League which play out of the at the Danbury Ice Arena.

The team was named after and operated by the ownership of the Danbury Hat Tricks, a minor professional team in the Federal Prospects Hockey League that was founded in 2019.

== History ==
In 2019, the Danbury Ice Arena was sold to Diamond Properties (DP 110, LLC), who then bought two franchises to play in their arena for the 2019–20 season: the Danbury Colonials of the Tier III junior North American 3 Hockey League (NA3HL) and another FHL (since rebranded as Federal Prospects Hockey League) team in the Danbury Hat Tricks.

The Colonials' franchise was purchased from the Niagara Falls PowerHawks organization and Kevin Cunningham was named as the first head coach of the Colonials. Former NHLer Colton Orr was named as co-owner and managing partner of both teams. The Colonials finished in second the Northeast Division in their inaugural season, but the playoffs were curtailed by the onset of the COVID-19 pandemic in March 2020.

On May 11, 2020, the organization announced they had also bought a franchise in the Tier II junior North American Hockey League (NAHL) from the Wilkes-Barre/Scranton Knights. Afterwards, both the Tier II and Tier III junior teams would be named 'Danbury Jr. Hat Tricks' after the professional team. Due to the limited capacity during the pandemic and interstate travel restrictions, the NA3HL team was one of several East Division teams to temporarily relocate to Massachusetts midseason, with the team playing out of Springfield, Massachusetts, as the Springfield Jr. Hat Tricks, before returning to Danbury in March 2021.

Following the 2020–21 season, Doug Friedman was hired as the head coach of the Hat Tricks, but left before coaching a game to join his alma mater, Boston University, as their director of hockey operations. The Jr. Hat Tricks then hired Tyler Noseworthy as head coach of the team. Following the 2021-22 season, McCreary would become President of Hockey Operations overseeing all three teams in the organization.

When the NA3HL released their schedule in July of 2024, the Jr. Hat Tricks were not included. The league did not comment on the removal of the team from the league.

== Season-by-season records ==
Season	GP	W	L	OTL	SOL	Pts	GF	GA	Finish	Playoffs
2019–20	47	24	22	1	0	49	184	171	2nd of 4, Northeast Div. 18th of 34, NA3HL	Playoffs cancelled due to the COVID-19 pandemic
2020–21	36	23	13	0	0	46	144	123	2nd of 5, East Div. 12th of 31, NA3HL	Lost Div. Semifinals, 0–2 vs. New Jersey Titans
2021–22	47	27	16	1	3	58	169	144	3rd of 6, East Div. 14th of 34, NA3HL	Won Div. Semifinals, 2–0 vs. Long Beach Sharks; Lost Div. Finals, 1–2 vs. Northeast Generals
2022–23	47	27	17	3	0	57	150	138	2nd of 6, East Div. 13th of 34, NA3HL	Won Div. Semifinals, 2–1 vs. Norwich Sea Captains; Lost Div. Finals, 0–2 vs. Northeast Generals
2023–24	47	8	37	2	0	18	93	201	6th of 6, East Div. 30th of 34, NA3HL	Did Not Qualify
