= Stan Fischler =

American sportswriter and broadcaster

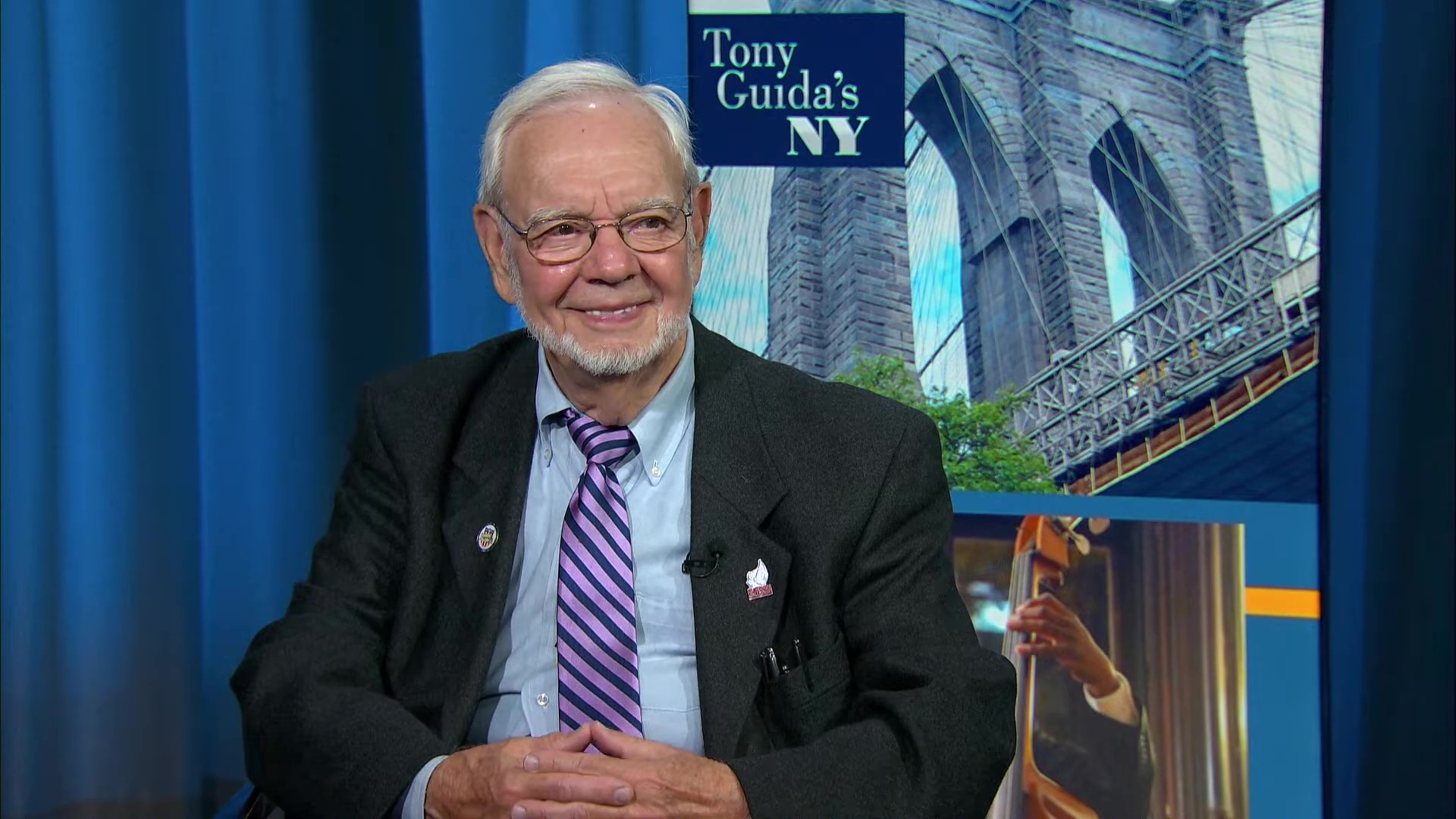
- Born: March 31, 1932 (age 94); Brooklyn, New York, U.S.
- Occupations: Hockey historian and broadcaster, New York City Subway historian, author, professor

Stanley I. Fischler (born March 31, 1932) is an American historian of hockey and the New York City Subway, as well as a broadcaster, author of over 100 books, and professor. As a broadcaster with MSG, Fischler has won seven Emmy Awards.

== Career ==
Graduating from Brooklyn College, Fischler began his journalism career as a publicist for the New York Rangers starting in the 1954–55 NHL season. Fischler eventually entered television broadcasting, serving as an analyst for the New England Whalers of the World Hockey Association beginning in the 1973–74 WHA season. After two years covering the Whalers, Fischler joined SportsChannel (now MSG) and covered the New York Islanders, New Jersey Devils and New York Rangers of the National Hockey League (NHL) on MSG and MSG Plus until his retirement from on-air productions after the 2017–2018 season. Fischler is perhaps best known for his work broadcasting with the MSG network, with whom he won seven Emmy Awards. As a broadcaster, Fischler was known for his cantankerous personality which occasionally caused controversy or debate on-air with colleagues.

He also provided general hockey analysis on MSG, and continues to write columns for the network's website. In 2009, Fischler began hosting a feature, "Five For Fischler", on Hockey Night Live! which lists his Top Five in a random hockey topic. In the 1980s, he was a hockey commentator for The Radio Show on CBC Radio in Canada.

In addition to broadcasting, Fischler has authored or co-authored almost 100 books on hockey, baseball and even a few on the New York subway system. His books include: The Hockey Encyclopedia, Everybody's Hockey Book, Hockey Chronicle, The New NHL Encyclopedia, Cracked Ice: An Insider's Look at the NHL, and most recently MetroIce: A Century of Hockey in Greater New York, focusing on the Rangers, Islanders and Devils franchises. His most famous subway book is Uptown, Downtown. Fischler contributed to the 2017 documentary Only the Dead Know the Brooklyn Americans; having followed the franchise as a young child before the team folded, he was one of the few living hockey fans to have witnessed the team firsthand. Until 2017, Fischler, a long time resident of Boiceville, NY, wrote a weekly column for the local Kingston Daily Freeman.

As a journalist and columnist, Fischler's articles have appeared in several publications including The New York Times, Sports Illustrated, Sport, Newsweek, The Hockey News, and the NHL's website.

On September 18, 2007, Fischler was announced as one of the four recipients of the 2007 Lester Patrick Trophy.

In December 2021, he was inducted into the U.S. Hockey Hall of Fame.

On October 26, 2022, the New York Islanders unveiled The Stan Fischler Press Level, dedicating UBS Arena's press level to Fischler.

As of August 2026, Fischler continues to publish hockey articles online, including with the NHL and The Hockey News.

== Personal life ==
Fischler was born on March 31, 1932, in Brooklyn, New York, the only child of parents Benjamin and Malkla 'Molly' (née Devorah) Fischler, and raised in a poor Jewish family. Although his family was Jewish, the Fischler's celebrated both Hanukkah and Christmas. His mother had immigrated from Czechoslovakia and had most of her remaining relatives killed during the Holocaust. A fan of hockey since childhood, Fischler saw his first live game in 1939, and his first NHL game, a match between the New York Rangers and Chicago Black Hawks, in 1942. Despite growing up in New York, which at points during his youth housed both the Rangers and New York Americans, Fischler grew up cheering for the Toronto Maple Leafs; he began regularly attending Toronto games when they played in New York beginning in 1946 and became a Rangers season ticket holder for the 1947–48 NHL season to see Maple Leafs games in person. Fischler was an original subscriber of The Hockey News magazine when it debuted in 1947, and first wrote for the publication in 1955.

On May 13, 2014, his wife Shirley—a hockey journalist in her own right and Fischler's long-time collaborator on many of his works—died of cancer at the age of 74.

After retiring from broadcasting in 2018, Fischler moved to El Rom, Israel, so that he could be closer to his son, Simon, an immigrant to El Rom, and his grandchildren, though he does not speak Hebrew. He exercises daily for one hour and often stays up late to catch hockey games played several hours behind in North America. Politically, Fischler identifies as a Zionist and credits some of his passion for Jewish causes and the protection of Israel to the loss of relatives in the Holocaust.
