= Brooklyn Aces =

- City: Brooklyn, New York
- League: Eastern Professional Hockey League
- Founded: 2008
- Home arena: Aviator Arena (2,500)
- Colors: Navy blue, Red, Silver
- Owner: Alan Friedman
- Head coach: Chris Firriolo

Franchise history
- 2008 to 2009: Brooklyn Aces

Championships
- Regular season titles: 1 (08-09)

The Brooklyn Aces are a defunct minor professional ice hockey team that played the 2008-09 season in the Eastern Professional Hockey League. They played their home games at the 2,500 seat Aviator Arena.

On June 17, 2008 the Brooklyn Aces announced Chris Firriolo as the team's first head coach.

== Notable players ==
On March 21 and 22, 2009, former New York Ranger great, Ron Duguay, suited up to play two games in the EPHL, one game with the Brooklyn Aces and the other with the Jersey Rockhoppers, to raise money for the Garden of Dreams Foundation, a nonprofit organization associated with Madison Square Garden. Duguay signed a waiver, and played his game with the Brooklyn Aces without a helmet, which allowed his hair to flow free as it did when he played in the NHL. With 37 seconds left in regulation, he assisted on the game-tying goal, but the Aces would lose 4-3 in overtime.
