= New Haven Blades =

Former professional ice hockey team from New Haven, Connecticut, USA

- City: New Haven, Connecticut
- League: Eastern Hockey League
- Operated: 1954-1973
- Home arena: New Haven Arena (New Haven Blades); Eastern States Coliseum (New England Blades)

Franchise history
- 1954-1972: New Haven Blades
- 1972-1973: New England Blades

The New Haven Blades were a professional ice hockey team from New Haven, Connecticut in the Eastern Hockey League (EHL). The team played from 1954 until 1972, then moved to West Springfield, Massachusetts as the New England Blades for the final, 1972–73, EHL season. The New Haven team played its home games in the New Haven Arena, while the New England team played its single season in the Eastern States Coliseum.

Following the Blades' departure, the New Haven Nighthawks of the American Hockey League began operation in the 1972–73 season, playing at the newly completed New Haven Veterans Memorial Coliseum.

The legacy of the New Haven Blades lives on as a joint high school girls hockey team called the Blades who represent North Haven High School, Cheshire High School, and Amity Regional High School.

== See also ==
- Professional ice hockey in Connecticut
