= Jersey Rockhoppers =

- City: West Orange, New Jersey
- League: Eastern Professional Hockey League
- Founded: 2008
- Home arena: Richard J. Codey Arena
- Colors: Black, Orange
- Owners: Curtis Russell, Igor Mrotchek
- General manager: Herm Sorcher
- Head coach: Brian Gratz

Franchise history
- 2008 to 2009: Jersey Rockhoppers

Championships
- Regular season titles: 1

The Jersey Rockhoppers were a professional ice hockey team based in West Orange, New Jersey, in the United States. They played the 2008–2009 season as members of the Eastern Professional Hockey League and played at the 2,500 seat Richard J. Codey Arena.

The Rockhoppers name was chosen by the team's owners after a name-the-team contest. The owners decided on an animal name. Co-owner Igor Mrotchek stated, "We think that Rockhoppers makes a nice match and is identifiable with grace, agility and an aggressive nature compared to other penguins".

The 2008-09 Rockhoppers were coached by Brian Gratz. On March 28, 2009, the Rockhoppers won the EPHL Championship by defeating the Brooklyn Aces 2 games to 1.

== Notable players ==
On March 21 and 22, 2009, former New York Ranger centre Ron Duguay played two games in the EPHL, one with the Brooklyn Aces and the other with the Jersey Rockhoppers, to raise money for the Garden of Dreams Foundation, a nonprofit organization associated with Madison Square Garden.

== Roster ==
Forwards
| # | | Player | Pos. | Shoots | Height | Weight | Place of Birth |
| 6 | (United States) | John Morea | LW | R | 5' 9" | 180 lbs. | Brooklyn, New York, United States |
| 8 | (United States) | Chris Ferazzoli | C | L | 5' 6" | 165 lbs. | Floral Park, New York, United States |
| 10 | (Canada) | Ron Duguay | F | R | 6' 2" | 210 lbs. | Sudbury, Ontario Canada |
| 16 | (United States) | Anthony Becker | F | R | 5' 11" | 173 lbs. | North Tonawanda, New York, United States |
| 17 | (United States) | Matt Tyree | F | L | 6' 1" | 210 lbs. | Spooner, Wisconsin, United States |
| 18 | (United States) | Logan Bittle | F | R | 6' 1" | 200 lbs. | Peoria, Illinois, United States |
| 19 | (United States) | Tom Boudreau | F | R | 5' 8" | 159 lbs. | Oak Lawn, Illinois, United States |
| 20 | (United States) | Drew Sanders | F | L | 5' 8" | 175 lbs. | Modesto, California, United States |
| 21 | (United States) | Kyle Bozoian | F | L | 6' 2" | 205 lbs. | St. Louis, Missouri, United States |
| 22 | (United States) | Jason McCrimmon | F | R | 6' 4" | 238 lbs. | Detroit, Michigan, United States |
| 25 | (United States) | Joe Welgos | F | R | 6' 2" | 190 lbs. | Darien, Illinois, United States |
| 27 | (United States) | Patrick Serpico | F | R | 5' 8" | 180 lbs. | Marlboro, New Jersey, United States |

Defensemen
| # | | Player | Pos. | Shoots | Height | Weight | Place of Birth |
| 5 | (United States) | Mike Bouchard | D | L | 6' 1" | 220 lbs. | Smithfield, Rhode Island, United States |
| 11 | (United States) | Rich Jondo | D | L | 6' 3" | 215 lbs. | Baltimore, Maryland, United States |
| 23 | (United States) | Alex Hager | D | R | 5' 09" | 256 lbs. | Warwick, Rhode Island, United States |
| 24 | (United States) | Dustin Henning | D | R | 5' 11" | 185 lbs. | Steamboat Springs, Colorado, United States |

Goaltenders
| # | | Player | Pos. | Catches | Height | Weight | Place of Birth |
| 1 | (United States) | Rob Lemelin | G | R | 6' 1" | 205 lbs. | South Hamilton, Massachusetts, United States |
| 39 | (United States) | Nick Niedert | G | R | 5' 8" | 185 lbs. | Hudson, Iowa, United States |
