= 1998–99 AHL season =

- League: American Hockey League
- Sport: Ice hockey

Regular season
- Macgregor Kilpatrick Trophy: Providence Bruins
- Season MVP: Randy Robitaille
- Top scorer: Domenic Pittis

Playoffs
- Playoffs MVP: Peter Ferraro

Calder Cup
- Champions: Providence Bruins
- Runners-up: Rochester Americans

AHL seasons
- 1997–98 1999–2000

The 1998–99 AHL season was the 63rd season of the American Hockey League. Nineteen teams played 80 games each in the schedule. The Providence Bruins finished first overall in the regular season, and won their first Calder Cup championship.

== Team changes ==
- The Lowell Lock Monsters join the AHL as an expansion team, based in Lowell, Massachusetts, playing in the Atlantic Division.

== Final standings ==
- y– indicates team clinched division and a playoff spot
- x– indicates team clinched a playoff spot
- e– indicates team was eliminated from playoff contention

=== Eastern Conference ===
Atlantic Division	GP	W	L	T	OTL	Pts	GF	GA
y–Lowell Lock Monsters (NYI)	80	33	32	13	2	81	219	237
x–St. John's Maple Leafs (TOR)	80	34	35	7	4	79	246	270
x–Fredericton Canadiens (MTL)	80	33	36	6	5	77	246	246
x–Saint John Flames (CGY)	80	31	40	8	1	71	238	296
e–Portland Pirates (CHI/WSH)	80	23	48	7	2	55	214	273

New England Division	GP	W	L	T	OTL	Pts	GF	GA
y–Providence Bruins (BOS)	80	56	16	4	4	120	321	223
x–Hartford Wolf Pack (NYR)	80	38	31	5	6	87	256	256
x–Springfield Falcons (LAK/PHX)	80	35	35	9	1	80	245	232
x–Worcester IceCats (STL)	80	34	36	8	2	78	237	260
e–Beast of New Haven (CAR/FLA)	80	33	35	7	5	78	240	250

=== Western Conference ===
Empire State Division	GP	W	L	T	OTL	Pts	GF	GA
y–Rochester Americans (BUF)	80	52	21	6	1	111	287	176
x–Albany River Rats (NJD)	80	46	26	6	2	100	275	230
x–Hamilton Bulldogs (EDM)	80	40	29	7	4	91	229	206
x–Adirondack Red Wings (DET)	80	21	48	8	3	53	184	280
e–Syracuse Crunch (PIT/VAN)	80	18	50	9	3	48	220	327

Mid-Atlantic Division	GP	W	L	T	OTL	Pts	GF	GA
y–Philadelphia Phantoms (PHI)	80	47	22	9	2	105	272	221
x–Kentucky Thoroughblades (FLA/SJS)	80	44	26	7	3	98	272	214
x–Hershey Bears (COL)	80	37	32	10	1	85	242	224
x–Cincinnati Mighty Ducks (ANA)	80	35	39	4	2	76	227	249

== Scoring leaders ==
Note: GP = Games played; G = Goals; A = Assists; Pts = Points; PIM = Penalty minutes

Player	Team	GP	G	A	Pts	PIM
Domenic Pittis	Rochester Americans	76	38	66	104	108
Randy Robitaille	Providence Bruins	74	28	74	102	34
John Madden	Albany River Rats	75	38	60	98	44
Peter White	Philadelphia Phantoms	77	31	59	90	20
Jim Montgomery	Philadelphia Phantoms	78	29	58	87	89
Steve Brule	Albany River Rats	78	32	52	84	35
Richard Park	Philadelphia Phantoms	75	41	42	83	33
Lonny Bohonos	St. John's Maple Leafs	70	34	48	82	40
Craig Fisher	Rochester Americans	70	29	52	81	28
Shane Willis	Beast of New Haven	73	31	50	81	49

- complete list

== Calder Cup playoffs ==
Division Semifinals	Division Finals
A1	Lowell	0
A4	Saint John	3
A4	Saint John	0
Atlantic Division
A3	Fredericton	4
A2	St. John's	2
A3	Fredericton	3
Eastern Conference
N1	Providence	3
N4	Worcester	1
N1	Providence	4
New England Division
N2	Hartford	0
N2	Hartford	3
N3	Springfield	0
E1	Rochester	3
E4	Adirondack	0
E1	Rochester	4
Empire State Division
E3	Hamilton	2
E2	Albany	2
E3	Hamilton	3
Western Conference
M1	Philadelphia	3
M4	Cincinnati	0
M1	Philadelphia	4
Mid-Atlantic Division
M2	Kentucky	3
M2	Kentucky	3
M3	Hershey	2

Conference Finals
A3	Fredericton	2
N1	Providence	4
E1	Rochester	4
M1	Philadelphia	2

Calder Cup Final
N1	Providence	4
E1	Rochester	1

== All Star Classic ==
The 12th AHL All-Star Game was played on January 25, 1999, at the First Union Center in Philadelphia. Team PlanetUSA defeated Team Canada 5–4 in a shootout. In the skills competition held the day before the All-Star Game, Team Canada won 15–12 over Team PlanetUSA.

== Trophy and award winners ==
=== Team awards ===
Calder Cup; Playoff champions:	Providence Bruins
Richard F. Canning Trophy; Eastern Conference playoff champions:	Providence Bruins
Robert W. Clarke Trophy; Western Conference playoff champions:	Rochester Americans
Macgregor Kilpatrick Trophy; Regular season champions, League:	Providence Bruins
Frank Mathers Trophy; Regular Season champions, Mid-Atlantic Division:	Philadelphia Phantoms
F. G. "Teddy" Oke Trophy; Regular Season champions, New England Division:	Providence Bruins
Sam Pollock Trophy; Regular Season champions, Atlantic Division:	Lowell Lock Monsters
John D. Chick Trophy; Regular Season champions, Empire State Division:	Rochester Americans

=== Individual awards ===
Les Cunningham Award; Most valuable player:	Randy Robitaille – Providence Bruins
John B. Sollenberger Trophy; Top point scorer:	Domenic Pittis – Rochester Americans
Dudley "Red" Garrett Memorial Award; Rookie of the year:	Shane Willis – Beast of New Haven
Eddie Shore Award; Defenceman of the year:	Ken Sutton – Albany River Rats
Aldege "Baz" Bastien Memorial Award; Best Goaltender:	Martin Biron – Rochester Americans
Harry "Hap" Holmes Memorial Award; Lowest goals against average:	Martin Biron & Tom Draper – Rochester Americans
Louis A.R. Pieri Memorial Award; Coach of the year:	Peter Laviolette – Providence Bruins
Fred T. Hunt Memorial Award; Sportsmanship / Perseverance:	Mitch Lamoureux – Hershey Bears
Yanick Dupre Memorial Award; Community Service Award:	Brent Thompson – Hartford Wolf Pack
Jack A. Butterfield Trophy; MVP of the playoffs:	Peter Ferraro – Providence Bruins

=== Other awards ===
James C. Hendy Memorial Award; Most outstanding executive:	Jody Gage, Rochester Americans
Thomas Ebright Memorial Award; Career contributions:	Gordon Anziano
James H. Ellery Memorial Awards; Outstanding media coverage:	Phil Janack, Albany, (newspaper); Tim Woodburn, Kentucky, (radio); Cable Atlantic, St. John's, (television)
Ken McKenzie Award; Outstanding marketing executive:	Cary Kaplan, Hamilton Bulldogs

== See also ==
- List of AHL seasons

Preceded by 1997–98 AHL season	AHL seasons	Succeeded by 1999–2000 AHL season
