= Beast of New Haven =

- City: New Haven, Connecticut
- League: American Hockey League
- Conference: Eastern
- Division: New England
- Operated: 1997–1999
- Home arena: New Haven Coliseum
- Colors: Blue, silver, yellow
- Head coach: Kevin McCarthy
- Affiliates: Carolina Hurricanes; Florida Panthers

Franchise history
- 1989–1995: Greensboro Monarchs
- 1995–1997: Carolina Monarchs
- 1997–1999: Beast of New Haven

The Beast of New Haven were an ice hockey team in the American Hockey League in the 1997–98 and 1998–99 seasons. The team was based in New Haven, Connecticut, and played at the Veterans Memorial Coliseum, which was demolished in 2007. The Beast were affiliated with the Carolina Hurricanes and the Florida Panthers. This franchise was known as the Carolina Monarchs from 1995 to 1997.

== Season-by-season results ==
=== Regular season ===
Season	Games	Won	Lost	Tied	OTL	Points	Goals for	Goals against	Standing
1997–98	80	38	33	7	2	85	256	239	3rd, New England
1998–99	80	33	35	7	5	78	240	250	5th, New England

=== Playoffs ===
Season	1st round	2nd round	3rd round	Finals
1997–98	L, 0-3, Hartford	—	—	—
1998–99	Out of playoffs			

== See also ==
- Professional Hockey In Connecticut
