= Danbury Mad Hatters =

- City: Danbury, Connecticut
- League: Eastern Professional Hockey League
- Founded: 2008
- Home arena: Danbury Ice Arena
- Colors: Black, Red
- Owners: Majority: Tim Kolpien; Minority: Curtis Russell
- General manager: Brendan Tedstone
- Head coach: Dave MacIsaac
- Media: The News-Times

Franchise history
- 2008 to 2009: Danbury Mad Hatters

Championships
- Regular season titles: 0

The Danbury Mad Hatters were a professional ice hockey team based in Danbury, Connecticut at the 3,050-seat Danbury Ice Arena. The Mad Hatters were a member of the Eastern Professional Hockey League.

The Mad Hatters name refers to Danbury's nickname as the "Hat City." The city was the former center of the hat industry, at one point producing 25% of America's hats. The "mad" was added to the nickname to differentiate the team from the athletic teams of Danbury High School, and also as a reference to the common colloquial expression, "mad like a hatter.

The team was owned by Col. Tim Kolpien of Corning, New York. On June 10, 2008, the team announced that former Danbury Trashers defenceman Dave MacIssac would be the head coach of the Mad Hatters.

== History ==
=== 2008-2009 ===
The Danbury Mad Hatters were founded in 2008 as an Eastern Professional Hockey League expansion team. The Mad Hatters had on-ice success during their first season, as they finished their inaugural regular season at 30-18-0-2, finished 3rd and missing the playoffs by 4 pts. They also finished 2nd in attendance with average attendance 984.

== Roster ==
Forwards
| # | | Player | Pos. | Shoots | Height | Weight | Place of Birth |
| 4 | (United States) | Drew Madeiros | C | L | 6' 0" | 200 lbs. | Tewksbury, Massachusetts, United States |
| 5 | (United States) | Ryan Stern | C | L | 5' 11" | 185 lbs. | Philadelphia, Pennsylvania, United States |
| 9 | (United States) | Bobby Pauls | LW | R | 5' 9" | 160 lbs. | Harrison, New York, United States |
| 12 | (United States) | Scott Horvath | C | R | 6'2" | 225 lbs. | West Redding, Connecticut, United States |
| 15 | (United States) | Erik Kent | RW | R | 5' 11" | 198 lbs. | Newburyport, Massachusetts, United States |
| 21 | (United States) | Stephen Schofield | LW | R | 6' 2" | 185 lbs. | Sherman Oaks, California, United States |
| 25 | (United States) | Brian Hannafin | RW | R | 5' 9" | 170 lbs. | Medford, Massachusetts, United States |
| 27 | (United States) | Obi Aduba | LW | L | 6' 1" | 210 lbs. | Walpole, Massachusetts, United States |
| 33 | (United States) | Matt Cosmos | RW | R | 6' 0" | 215 lbs. | Middlebury, Connecticut, United States |
| 33 | (United States) | Jason Michaelson | F | R | 6' 3" | 250 lbs. | Newton, Connecticut, United States |

Defensemen
| # | | Player | Pos. | Shoots | Height | Weight | Place of Birth |
| 14 | (United States) | Dan Hickman | D | L | 5' 9" | 190 lbs. | Hamden, Connecticut, United States |
| 17 | (Canada) | Shawn Breaker | D | R | 6' 0" | 205 lbs. | Strathmore, Alberta, Canada |
| 22 | (United States) | Jonathan Loundsbury | D | R | 5' 10" | 175 lbs. | Winthrop, Massachusetts, United States |
| 23 | (United States) | Alex Redmond | D | R | 6' 2" | 205 lbs. | San Jose, California, United States |
| 44 | (Canada) | Chad Jones | D | L | 6' 1" | 210 lbs. | Wiarton, Ontario, Canada |

Goaltenders
| # | | Player | Pos. | Catches | Height | Weight | Place of Birth |
| 1 | (United States) | Derek MacIntyre | G | R | 6' 2" | 211 lbs. | Stanwood, Michigan, United States |
| 32 | (United States) | Jeff Hill | G | R | 5' 8" | 160 lbs. | Cranston, Rhode Island, United States |

== See also ==
- Professional Hockey In Connecticut
