= Danbury Ice Arena =

Multi-purpose arena in Danbury, Connecticut

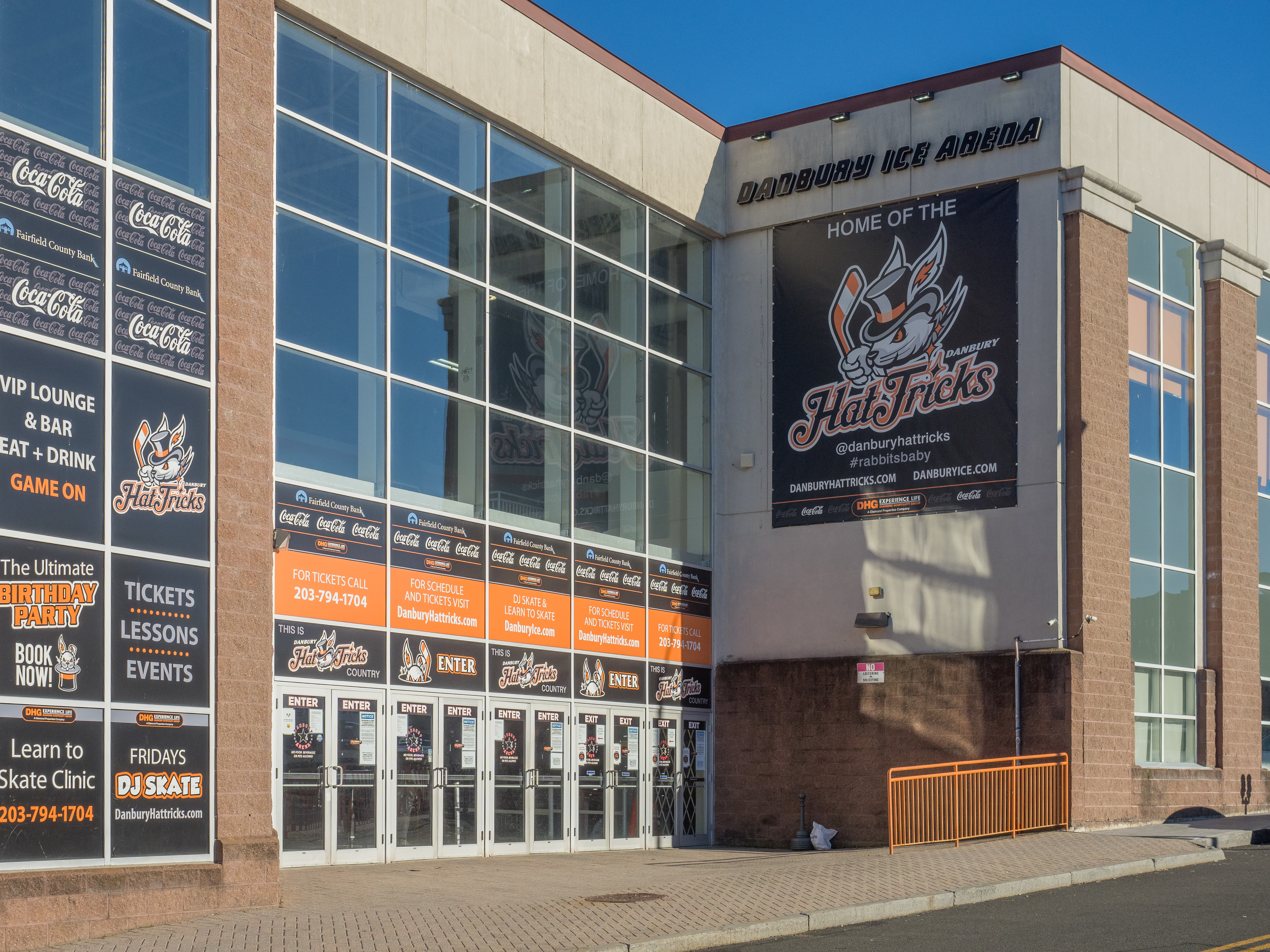
- (2024)
- Interactive map of Danbury Ice Arena
- Location: One Independence Way; Danbury, Connecticut
- Coordinates: 41.3951°N 73.4503°W
- Owner: Diamond Properties
- Capacity: 3,000 (Boxing/MMA); 2,340 (Concerts); 2,000 (Hockey w/500 SRO)
- Public transit: Danbury; HARTransit: 2, 7

Construction
- Opened: 1999
- Renovated: 2004

Tenants
- Danbury Trashers (UHL) (2004–2006); Danbury Mad Hatters (EPHL) (2008–2009); Danbury Whalers (FHL) (2010–2015); Danbury Titans (FHL) (2015–2017); Connecticut Whale (PHF) (2019–2022); Danbury Colonials/Jr Hat Tricks (NA3HL) (2019–2024); Danbury Hat Tricks (FPHL) (2019–present); Danbury Jr. Hat Tricks (NAHL) (2020–present); Spice City FC (MASL2) (2024–present); Danbury Diesel (ENTFLA) (2025–present)

Website
- www.danburyice.com

The Danbury Ice Arena is a multi-purpose indoor arena in Danbury, Connecticut. It was built in 1999 with renovation and expansion in 2004, and has a seating capacity of about 3,000.

The Danbury Arena was the home of the Danbury Trashers of the United Hockey League from 2004 to 2006. In 2008, the Danbury Mad Hatters of the Eastern Professional Hockey League signed a lease with the arena and played one season before the league folded.

On December 27, 2009, the newly formed Federal Hockey League (FHL) announced that the Danbury Arena would be home to the Danbury Whalers. On April 3, 2015, the Danbury Ice Arena did not want to renew their contract with the Danbury Whalers and gave them a notice to evict by April 17, leaving the last remaining team from the inaugural FHL season homeless. After initially announcing the Stateline Whalers to begin playing in nearby Brewster, New York, the Whalers organization was dissolved and a new group started the Danbury Titans in the FHL to play the 2015–16 season. The Titans also ceased operations in 2017.

In 2019, the Hall family, who had owned the arena for 18 years, sold the arena to Diamond Properties. The new management, with Herm Sorcher from the previous FHL organizations acting as managing director, brought in three new tenants for the 2019–20 season: the Connecticut Whale of the Premier Hockey Federation, the Danbury Colonials of the junior North American 3 Hockey League, and another FHL (since rebranded as Federal Prospects Hockey League) team in the Danbury Hat Tricks.
