= New Haven Coliseum =

Sports and entertainment arena in Connecticut, U.S.

Coordinates: 41.302490°N 72.925454°W

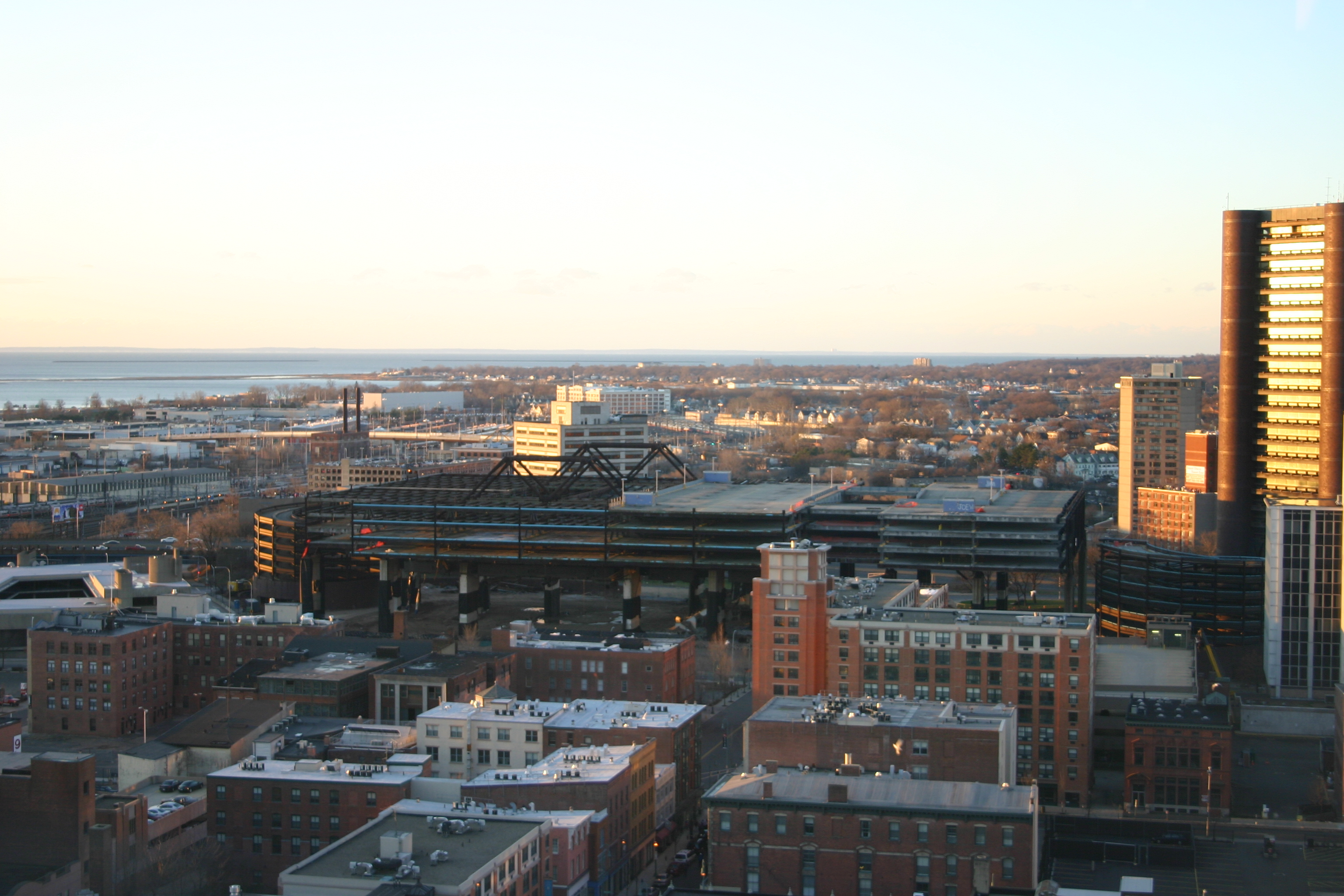
- The Coliseum on the morning of the implosion, with much of the structure stripped away.
- Interactive map of New Haven Coliseum
- Address: 275 South Orange Street, New Haven, CT 06510
- Location: New Haven, Connecticut
- Owner: City of New Haven
- Capacity: Full: 11,497; Basketball: Ice hockey:
- Surface: 200 ft × 85 ft (61 m × 26 m) (hockey)

Construction
- Groundbreaking: 1968
- Opened: 1972
- Closed: September 1, 2002
- Demolished: January 20, 2007
- Architect: Roche-Dinkeloo

Tenants
- New Haven Nighthawks/Senators (AHL) (1972–1993); UConn Huskies (NCAA) (1978–1987); Hartford Hellions (MISL) (1979–1980); Connecticut Coasters (RHI) (1993); Beast of New Haven (AHL) (1997–1999); New Haven Knights (UHL) (2000–2002); New Haven Ninjas (AF2) (2002)

New Haven Coliseum, formally known as New Haven Veterans Memorial Coliseum, was a sports and entertainment arena located in downtown New Haven, Connecticut. Construction began in 1968 and was completed in 1972. The Coliseum was officially closed on September 1, 2002, by Mayor John DeStefano Jr., and demolished by implosion on January 20, 2007.

The arena's formal name was New Haven Veterans Memorial Coliseum, but most locals simply referred to it as "New Haven Coliseum". The Coliseum held 11,497 people at full capacity, and occupied 4.5 acres (18,000 m^{2}) of land next to the Knights of Columbus Building and faced the Oak Street Connector/Route 34 downtown spur.

== Hosted events ==
The first event hosted at the Coliseum was an exhibition hockey game between the Springfield Kings and the newly formed New Haven Nighthawks of the American Hockey League on October 4, 1972.

In addition to the Nighthawks, the Coliseum hosted the New Haven Knights of the United Hockey League, New Haven Senators, and Beast of New Haven of the American Hockey League, as well as the 1984 Metro Atlantic Athletic Conference and Yale University's 2002 National Invitational Tournament men's college basketball tournament opening round games. Also, it was home of the Connecticut Coasters roller hockey team in 1993 and the New Haven Ninjas af2 team in 2002. The UConn Huskies men's basketball team played home games at the arena as their part-time home from 1978 to 1987. Ice Capades also performed at the Coliseum. New Haven Coliseum was also second home to Yale University Hockey, playing games sporadically at the Coliseum over the years. The U.S.A. Women's Olympic Squad played an exhibition game vs. Sweden on December 15, 2001.

During the Coliseum's existence, many of the era's most prominent musical stars appeared at the venue, notable performers included Grateful Dead, who played there a total of eleven times between May 1977 and April 1984, Rush, Elvis Presley, Frank Sinatra, Lynyrd Skynyrd, Bee Gees, Queen, Aerosmith, Black Sabbath, Jethro Tull, Pat Benatar, Judas Priest, Bon Jovi, Kiss, Phish, and Guns N' Roses.

Most notably, in 1986, the Coliseum served as the setting for Van Halen's multi-platinum concert film Live Without a Net. It also was the home of the famous "Eruption" solo performed by Eddie Van Halen and his bandmates which took place on August 27, 1986.

The pilot episode of WWE SmackDown was filmed at the Coliseum on April 27, 1999, and aired on UPN two days later.

Tool was the final musical act on August 20, 2002.

The final event held at the Coliseum was a professional wrestling show held by World Wrestling Entertainment, one of the original attractions in the arena since 1972. The WWE considered the Coliseum its home arena, as it was—for much of its history—the closest venue to WWE's headquarters in Stamford, Connecticut. Most matches were broadcast, first on WTNH, as well as on local UHF stations.

== History ==
=== Construction ===
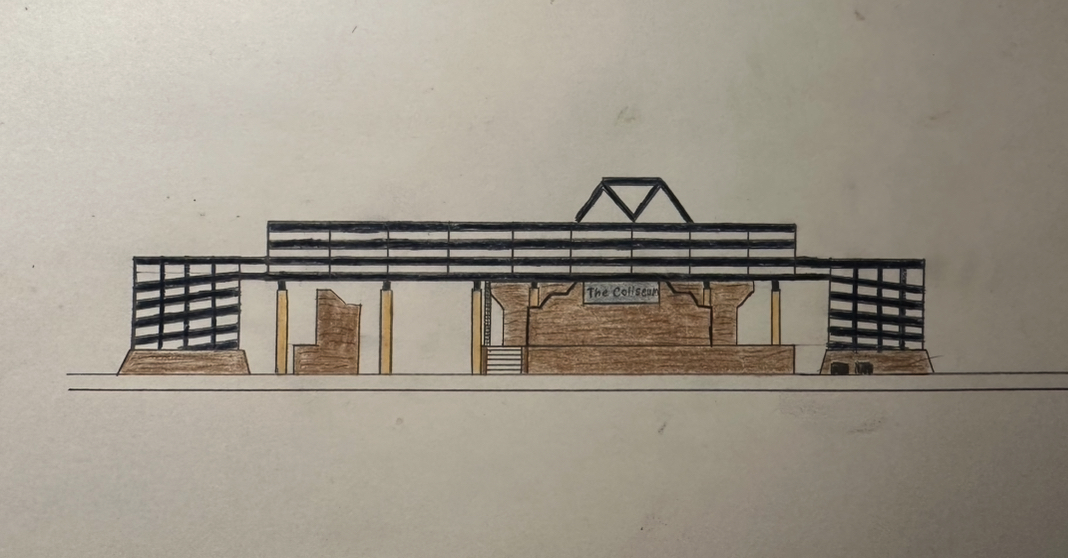
Artist's conception of the Coliseum as it appeared during its operating years.

The Coliseum was built to replace the New Haven Arena, New Haven's prior indoor sports and entertainment venue. The Coliseum, as well as the neighboring Knights of Columbus building, was designed by the architect Kevin Roche of Roche-Dinkeloo. One interesting aspect of the arena's design was that the parking garage was built on top of the actual Coliseum structure; this was necessitated by a high water table in the area which made it overly difficult to construct sub-surface parking facilities. Though an interesting solution, this design proved unpopular because of the quarter-mile helical ramps required to access the parking. Vincent Scully, the revered architectural historian at nearby Yale University, often referred to the design as "Structural Exhibitionism" in his modern architecture lectures. Other features of the design, such as street storefronts and an exhibition hall, were never completed.

=== Deterioration and closure ===
During the 1980s, the structure of the parking garages had deteriorated to the point where large canvas panels had to be attached to the outside to catch pieces of concrete that would occasionally drop off onto the sidewalk below. Renovations were made to correct that problem. The city shut down the facility in 2002 after concluding that it was a drain on city coffers. However, the city did not hold any public hearings, referendum votes, or conduct any surveys, and several groups, local stakeholders, and the Coalition to Save Our Coliseum mounted a campaign to save and renovate the Coliseum, to no avail. Others in the community supported the plan to demolish the arena. Despite Mayor DeStefano's plan to close and demolish the building within six months, it ultimately took more than four years.

Among the reasons for the Coliseum's demise was the construction or renovation (often with state money) in the 1990s of alternative comparably sized venues within the southern Connecticut market. The Arena at Harbor Yard in Bridgeport attracted a minor league hockey team, the Bridgeport Sound Tigers. The Mohegan Sun Arena was built about an hour away, and became the home of the Connecticut Sun. Many musical acts started booking the Oakdale Theatre in the city of Wallingford, Connecticut, after it was upgraded and expanded. Even though the state gave $5.5 million to the arena for new paint, signage, and scoreboards, the Coliseum simply could not compete with newer facilities. Even as early as 1980 the Coliseum was decried as a "white elephant". Mayor DeStefano also had staked out a strategy of investing city resources into arts and cultural activities rather than attracting sports teams to the city.

=== Demolition ===
The controlled demolition of the New Haven Coliseum.

Actual demolition work began in late October 2005 with removal of most of the arena area. At 7:50 a.m. on January 20, 2007, after years of wrangling and delay, the Coliseum was finally imploded, using more than 2,000 pounds of explosive. It was said that the implosion could be heard all the way to Meriden and Northford. As it came down, a massive cloud of dust and smoke covered the surrounding area, but blew away quickly toward the shoreline. Upwards of 20,000 people watched from the nearby Temple Street Garage and other buildings, and residents of nearby apartments were evacuated. The two helical ramps were not imploded, and were subsequently destroyed by conventional methods.

The city has tentative plans to replace the Coliseum with a new downtown/Long Wharf redevelopment plan, including a relocated Long Wharf Theatre and a new campus for Gateway Community College.

A temporary 400-space parking lot opened on the former Coliseum site on December 4, 2007, but plans are advancing to redevelop the site with a hotel, hundreds of housing units and approximately 40,000 square feet (3,700 m^{2}) of commercial space. The master developer, LiveWorkLearnPlay had the project approved in 2013, but construction has been delayed due to cost issues related to the moving of utilities and conflicts related to planned highway improvements.

On January 12, 2009, the Knights of Columbus filed a lawsuit against the City of New Haven, Stamford Wrecking Company and Demolition Dynamics Company. The lawsuit seeks repayment for damages incurred to the Knights of Columbus Building and Knights of Columbus Museum across the street from the Coliseum.

=== After demolition ===
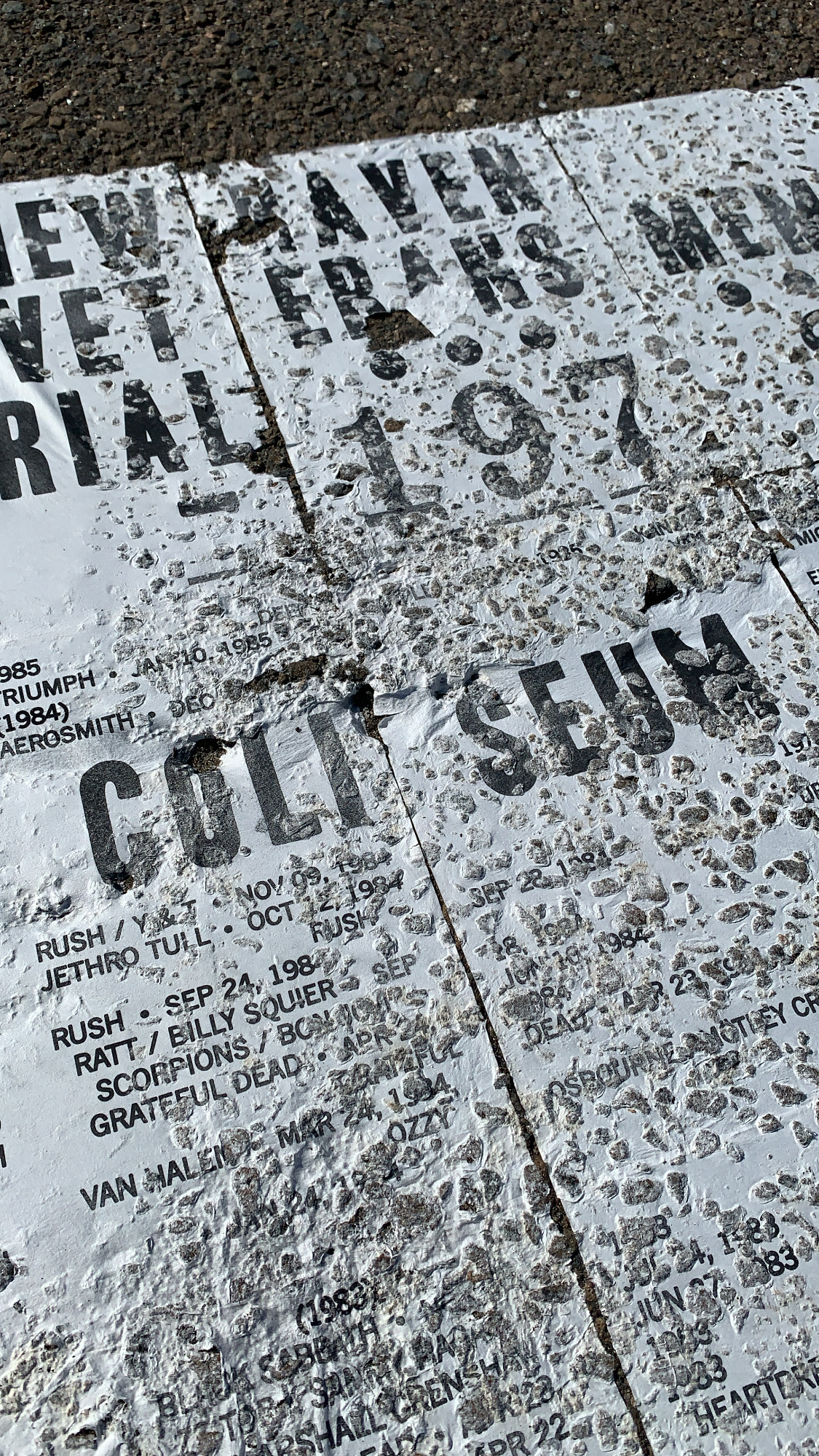
A poster that documents all concerts held at the coliseum

A poster archiving all concerts held at the Coliseum was installed on the parking lot, on March 4, 2021. It was a commemoration of the Coliseum and rock 'n roll culture.

In 2024, Anthem Square 10: a luxury low-rise residential building was constructed on the site of the Coliseum and opened that same year.

== See also ==
- Last Days of the Coliseum (2010 documentary film)
