= Eastern Professional Hockey League (2008–09) =

- Sport: Ice hockey
- Founded: 2008
- Folded: 2009
- Commissioner: Jim Riggs
- No. of teams: 4
- Country: United States
- Last champion: Jersey Rockhoppers
- Website: Official Site

The Eastern Professional Hockey League (EPHL) was a low-level professional ice hockey league. The league was developed by Curtis Russell, Tim Kolpien, Igor Mrotchek, and Jim Riggs, the former commissioner of the Mid-Atlantic Hockey League in 2007.

== League history ==
Jim Riggs was hired to become the commissioner of the EPHL after being the commissioner of three leagues that folded.

In October 2008, weeks before the first games were scheduled, two franchises (the Rome, New York-based Copper City Chiefs and the Exeter, New Hampshire-based New Hampshire Freeze) were replaced by the Hudson Valley Bears, based in Poughkeepsie and Newburgh, New York.

The four-team league played the 2008–09 season with the Brooklyn Aces winning the regular season title. The Aces lost a three-game championship series to the Jersey Rockhoppers, two games to one. Average league attendance was 821.

The Hyannis Storm were announced as an expansion team to begin play in the 2009–10 season, however, Dan Adams, the chief investor of the Storm, said he would not be moving forward with bringing the team to the Hyannis Youth and Community Center that year.

On April 10, 2009, Curtis Russell became President of the EPHL after Tim Kolpien resigned.

The Eastern Professional Hockey League did not return for a second season. Mad Hatters principal owner and former EPHL president Tim Kolpien all but acknowledged the minor ice hockey league no longer exists. "Frustrating to say, but no consensus or agreement has been reached," Kolpien said by e-mail, "But given where we are on the calendar, I don't see any way the Mad Hatters or EPHL can play in 2009–10.

== 2008–09 season ==
=== Standings ===
	GP	W	L	OTL	SOL	GF	GA	Pts
Brooklyn Aces	50	35	9	4	2	278	157	76
Jersey Rockhoppers	50	32	16	1	1	243	198	66
Danbury Mad Hatters	50	30	18	0	2	222	171	62
Hudson Valley Bears	50	3	45	1	1	145	362	8

== Teams ==
The league had four teams located in the Northeast portion of the United States.

Team	City	Arena (capacity)	Avg. attendance
Brooklyn Aces	Brooklyn, New York	Aviator Arena (2,500)	1,098
Danbury Mad Hatters	Danbury, Connecticut	Danbury Ice Arena (2,344)	984
Hudson Valley Bears	Poughkeepsie, New York	Mid-Hudson Civic Center (650); Ice Time Sports Complex (400)	235
Jersey Rockhoppers	West Orange, New Jersey	Richard J. Codey Arena (2,500)	935

== Champions by year ==
2008–09 — Jersey Rockhoppers: On March 28, 2009, the Jersey Rockhoppers won the first EPHL Championship with a 4–1 victory over the Brooklyn Aces at the Aviator Arena in Brooklyn, New York. Jersey prevailed in Game 3 of the Finals, winning two straight after dropping the series opener.

== Awards ==
- 2008–09 MVP Nick Niedert, Goaltender, Jersey
- 2008–09 Rookie of the Year C.J. Tozzo, Forward, Brooklyn
- 2008–09 Defensemen of the Year Nick Grove, Jersey and Chris Clark Hudson Valley, co-winners
- 2008–09 Finals MVP Chris Ferazzoli, Forward, Jersey
