= North Eastern Hockey League =

Semi-professional ice hockey league

- North Eastern Hockey League logo
- Sport: Ice hockey
- Founded: 2003
- Folded: 2008
- Country: United States; Canada

The North Eastern Hockey League was a semi-professional ice hockey league from 2003 until 2008. It was created by entrepreneur Jim Cashman, who served as league president. The NEHL was built to focus on giving players that were not quite ready for the ECHL, United Hockey League, and the Central Hockey League a place to play and develop after their Junior and college careers had finished. In the 2003-04 season, nine total players moved up to the "AA" level and remained there and six of those players came from the York IceCats alone.

== History ==
The League started with four franchises, the York IceCats out of York, Pennsylvania, Jamestown Titans out of Jamestown, New York, Mohawk Valley Comets out of Utica, New York, and the Poughkeepsie Panthers out of Poughkeepsie, New York. After very low attendance in the first few games in Poughkeepsie, the team was to be relocated to Connecticut and renamed the Connecticut Cougars but negotiations with an arena broke down and the Cougars finished as a road team for the remainder of the season.

When concerns of Comets players not being available for the final month of the season due to their summer jobs starting, Coach Brett Boake requested a schedule change and the season was shortened a month. The Comets decided two days before the playoff weekend that they were not going to participate as not enough players were available and they had financial concerns.

With the Comets as the league regular season leaders, they were to get a bye straight to the finals, which was to be played on Sunday. York and Jamestown (the second and third place teams) were to play on the Saturday to see who went on to face the Comets. Once the Comets had informed the league that they would not be playing, the league changed the playoff structure. York and Jamestown would play a two-game series that weekend. If there were a tie after the two games they would play a mini-game lasting twenty minutes.

York won the opening game, 8-5. Jamestown defeated York 9-1 in the second game and then won a 20-minute tiebreaker game 6-1. As league champions, the Titans received the Herb Brooks Memorial Trophy.

The league went dark for the 2004-05 season, then attempted to return in 2005-06 as the Continental Professional Hockey League with teams in Canada and the United States.

The regular 44-game season was supposed to start in early November 2005, was postponed, saw six games played, and was cancelled in mid-December 2005.

In the 2006-2007 season, the New England Stars finished first with a record of 20-0, and cruised in the Championship series beating the Mohawk Valley Icecats 2 games to 0 (8-5 and 9-2) to capture the 2006-2007 NEHL Crown.

The league announced on January 23, 2008 that it was suspending operations for the remainder of the 2007-08 season.

=== Teams ===
2003–2004

- Jamestown Titans
- Mohawk Valley Comets (resurrected as the Copper City Chiefs 2007-08)
- Poughkeepsie Panthers (later known as the Connecticut Cougars)
- York IceCats (relocated to St. Catharines, ON for 05-06)

2005–2006

(teams only played six games until the league suspended operations for a season)

- Philadelphia Comets (travel team)
- Pittsburgh Pounders (became Danville Pounders for 06-07)
- St. Catharines IceCats
- Sault Ste. Marie Stampede

2006–2007

- Danville Pounders (relocated to Detroit/Brighton, Michigan for 2007–2008)
- Findlay Freedom (Findlay, Ohio)
- Mohawk Valley IceCats (relocated to Simcoe, ON for 2007–2008)
- New England Stars (Danbury, Connecticut)

2007–08

- Copper City Chiefs (Rome, New York)
- Findlay Freedom
- Kensington Valley Pounders (Brighton, Michigan)
- Norfolk IceCats (Simcoe, Ontario)

== Previous NEHL ==
A previous league was also known as the Northeastern Hockey League during the 1978-79 season. This league renamed itself the Eastern Hockey League for the 1979-80 season.
