= Providence Friars men's ice hockey statistical leaders =

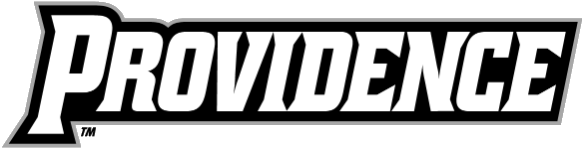

The Providence Friars men's ice hockey statistical leaders are individual statistical leaders of the Providence Friars men's ice hockey program in various categories, including goals, assists, points, and saves. Within those areas, the lists identify single-game, single-season, and career leaders. The Friars represent Providence College in the NCAA's Hockey East.

Providence began competing in intercollegiate ice hockey in 1926. These lists are updated through the end of the 2023–24 season.

== Goals ==
Career
Rk	Player	Goals	Seasons
1	Rob Gaudreau	103	1988–89 1989–90 1990–91 1991–92
2	Gord Cruickshank	99	1984–85 1985–86 1986–87 1987–88
3	Gates Orlando	95	1980–81 1981–82 1982–83 1983–84
4	Kurt Kleinendorst	89	1979–80 1980–81 1981–82 1982–83
5	Ed Monahan	85	1952–53 1953–54 1954–55 1955–56
6	Ron Wilson	78	1973–74 1974–75 1975–76 1976–77
	Chad Quenneville	78	1991–92 1992–93 1993–94 1994–95
8	Dan Kennedy	75	1972–73 1973–74 1974–75 1975–76
9	Steve O'Neill	74	1977–78 1978–79 1979–80 1980–81
10	Mike Boback	73	1988–89 1989–90 1990–91 1991–92

Season
Rk	Player	Goals	Season
1	Paul Guay	34	1982–83
	Gord Cruickshank	34	1985–86
	Rob Gaudreau	34	1990–91
4	Kurt Kleinendorst	33	1982–83
5	Randy Wilson	30	1975–76
	Kurt Kleinendorst	30	1981–82
	Gates Orlando	30	1982–83
8	Ken Richardson	29	1974–75
	Gord Cruickshank	29	1987–88
10	Lou LaFontaine	28	1956–57
	Grant Heffernan	28	1964–65
	Steve Rooney	28	1984–85
	Rob Gaudreau	28	1988–89

Single Game
Rk	Player	Goals	Season	Opponent
1	Ed Monahan	6	1955–56	Boston University
	Randy Wilson	6	1975–76	Merrimack

== Assists ==
Career
Rk	Player	Assists	Seasons
1	Ron Wilson	172	1973–74 1974–75 1975–76 1976–77
2	Mike Boback	128	1988–89 1989–90 1990–91 1991–92
3	Gates Orlando	118	1980–81 1981–82 1982–83 1983–84
4	Tim Army	108	1981–82 1982–83 1983–84 1984–85
	Rob Gaudreau	108	1988–89 1989–90 1990–91 1991–92
6	Dave Dornseif	103	1974–75 1975–76 1976–77 1977–78
	Kurt Kleinendorst	103	1979–80 1980–81 1981–82 1982–83
8	Fernando Pisani	97	1996–97 1997–98 1998–99 1999–00
9	Brad Wilson	96	1974–75 1975–76 1976–77 1977–78
10	Bob Cowan	95	1989–90 1990–91 1991–92 1992–93

Season
Rk	Player	Assists	Season
1	Ron Wilson	61	1974–75
2	Mike Boback	48	1991–92
3	Ron Wilson	47	1975–76
	Tim Army	47	1984–85
5	Ron Wilson	42	1976–77
	Jack Dugan	42	2019–20
7	Rich Pumple	41	1970–71
8	Kurt Kleinendorst	39	1982–83
	Gates Orlando	39	1982–83
10	Joe Barile	37	1956–57
	Bruce Raboin	37	1982–83
	Fernando Pisani	37	1998–99

Single Game
Rk	Player	Assists	Season	Opponent
1	Joe Barile	8	1958–59	AIC

== Points ==
Career
Rk	Player	Points	Seasons
1	Ron Wilson	250	1973–74 1974–75 1975–76 1976–77
2	Gates Orlando	213	1980–81 1981–82 1982–83 1983–84
3	Rob Gaudreau	211	1988–89 1989–90 1990–91 1991–92
4	Mike Boback	201	1988–89 1989–90 1990–91 1991–92
5	Kurt Kleinendorst	192	1979–80 1980–81 1981–82 1982–83
6	Tim Army	179	1981–82 1982–83 1983–84 1984–85
7	Dan Kennedy	168	1972–73 1973–74 1974–75 1975–76
8	Chad Quenneville	167	1991–92 1992–93 1993–94 1994–95
9	Steve O'Neill	164	1977–78 1978–79 1979–80 1980–81
10	Brad Wilson	159	1974–75 1975–76 1976–77 1977–78
	Gord Cruickshank	159	1984–85 1985–86 1986–87 1987–88

Season
Rk	Player	Points	Season
1	Ron Wilson	87	1974–75
2	Tim Army	74	1984–85
3	Kurt Kleinendorst	72	1982–83
	Mike Boback	72	1991–92
5	Gates Orlando	69	1982–83
6	Ron Wilson	66	1975–76
7	Paul Guay	65	1982–83
8	Rich Pumple	63	1970–71
9	Rob Gaudreau	61	1990–91
10	Brad Wilson	59	1975–76
	Ron Wilson	59	1976–77

Single Game
Rk	Player	Points	Season	Opponent
1	Joe Barile	9	1958–59	AIC

== Saves ==
Career
Rk	Player	Saves	Seasons
1	Alex Beaudry	3,158	2008–09 2009–10 2010–11 2011–12
2	Jon Gillies	3,000	2012–13 2013–14 2014–15
3	Nolan Schaefer	2,848	1999–00 2000–01 2001–02 2002–03
4	Bill Milner	2,839	1975–76 1976–77 1977–78 1978–79
5	Tyler Sims	2,793	2004–05 2005–06 2006–07 2007–08
6	Dan Dennis	2,790	1993–94 1994–95 1995–96 1996–97
7	Mario Proulx	2,785	1980–81 1981–82 1982–83 1983–84
8	Hayden Hawkey	2,773	2015–16 2016–17 2017–18 2018–19
9	Chris Terreri	2,719	1982–83 1983–84 1984–85 1985–86
10	Boyd Ballard	2,518	1997–98 1998–99 1999–00 2000–01

Season
Rk	Player	Saves	Season
1	Chris Terreri	1418	1984–85
2	Nolan Schaefer	1072	2001–02
3	Dan Dennis	1036	1995–96
4	Jon Gillies	1029	2014–15
5	Mario Proulx	1003	1982–83
6	Jon Gillies	992	2012–13
7	Jon Gillies	979	2013–14
8	Nick Ellis	970	2015–16
9	Alex Beaudry	906	2009–10
10	Hayden Hawkey	903	2016–17

Single Game
Rk	Player	Saves	Season	Opponent
1	Ed Hornstein	66	1954–55	Clarkson
2	Chris Terreri	65	1984–85	Boston College
3	Chris Terreri	62	1984–85	RPI
4	David Cacciola	60	2004–05	Boston College
5	Tyler Sims	59	2005–06	New Hampshire
6	Nick Ellis	54	2015–16	Minnesota Duluth
7	Tyler Sims	51	2004–05	Boston University
8	Jon Gillies	49	2014–15	Boston University
9	Jon Gillies	48	2012–13	UMass Lowell
10	Bill Milner	47	1977–78	Cornell
	Bill Milner	47	1975–76	Harvard
	Chris Terreri	47	1985–86	North Dakota
	Matt Merten	47	1986–87	Boston University
	Mike Heinke	47	1990–91	RPI
	Bob Bell	47	1994–95	Maine
	Bobby Goepfert	47	2003–04	Northeastern
	Alex Beaudry	47	2009–10	Massachusetts
