= Kleinendorst =

Kleinendorst is a Dutch surname. Notable people with the surname include:

- Kurt Kleinendorst (born 1960), American ice hockey coach, brother of Scot
- Scot Kleinendorst (1960–2019), American ice hockey player
