= Providence Friars men's ice hockey =

College Ice Hockey Team

- Current season
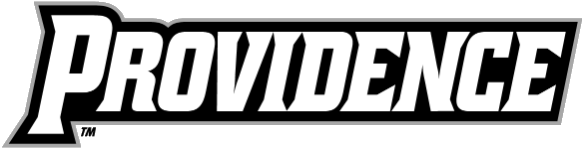
- University: Providence College
- Conference: Hockey East
- Head coach: Nate Leaman; 15th season, 280–174–67 (.602)
- Assistant coaches: Ron Rolston; Joel Beal; Joe Palmer
- Arena: Schneider Arena; Providence, Rhode Island
- Colors: Black, White, and Silver

NCAA tournament champions
- 2015

NCAA tournament runner-up
- 1985

NCAA tournament Frozen Four
- 1964, 1983, 1985, 2015, 2019

NCAA tournament appearances
- 1964, 1978, 1981, 1983, 1985, 1989, 1991, 1996, 2001, 2014, 2015, 2016, 2017, 2018, 2019, 2025, 2026

Conference tournament champions
- ECAC: 1964, 1981; Hockey East: 1985, 1996

Conference regular season champions
- ECAC: 1964, 1983; Hockey East: 2016, 2026

Current uniform

The Providence Friars men's ice hockey team is a National Collegiate Athletic Association (NCAA) Division I college ice hockey program that represents Providence College. A member of Hockey East, the Friars have been coached by Nate Leaman since 2011. Leaman led the Friars to a national championship in 2015. They play at the 3,030-seat Schneider Arena in Providence, Rhode Island.

== History ==
=== Early years ===
Providence began their ice hockey program in 1927 with a 6–4 win over Springfield. Unfortunately it would be over 25 years before the Friars could get their next win. The inaugural season ended with seven straight losses, utilizing three coaches in total, and due to a lack of available ice the program was shuttered until 1952. When Providence did return to the ice they did so in the Rhode Island Auditorium, and with Providence native Dick Rondeau behind the bench. The results were poor at the start, understandably, but Rondeau did get the Friars to produce a winning season in his third year, coincidentally the same year the Friars played in their first conference, the NEHL.

Rondeau left after 1956 and turned the team over to Tom Eccleston who continued to build the Friar's resume. In 8 seasons Eccleston only had one losing season and when ECAC Hockey was formed in 1961 he had the team well-positioned. Despite a 14th-place finish (out of 28) Providence was selected as one of the 8 teams to participate in the first conference tournament. The Friars shot up the standings the following year, finishing 5th before winning their first conference title in 1964 which they followed up with the Conference Championship. The win sent Providence to the National tournament for the first time but the Friars lost both games to finish a disappointing 4th.

=== Lamoriello years ===
Eccleston retired from coaching in 1964 and turned the team over to former NHLer Zellio Toppazzini but, after a good first season, the Friars plummeted to the bottom of the conference and remained their for three years before former Friar all-star Lou Lamoriello was installed as head coach. The team began to recover in Lamoriello's second season and made the conference tournament the following year. After a few seasons oscillating up and down the standings Lamoriello recruited Ron Wilson to Providence and the defenseman paid immediate dividends. Wilson won the ECAC Hockey Rookie of the Year in 1974 and then exploded for 87 points in just 27 games during his sophomore season. Wilson led the entire conference in scoring and finished second in the nation and set an all-time NCAA record for assists (61) and points (87) by a defenseman both overall and per game. While the overall totals have both been surpassed, Wilson still has the records for assists and points per game for a defenseman (as of 2019). Wilson was named the ECAC Hockey Player of the Year but without much help (as evidenced by his contributing on 72.5% of Providence's goals that season) Wilson couldn't get the Friars past the conference quarterfinals in any of his 4 seasons.

After Wilson graduated in 1977, Lamoriello was able to keep the team in the conference playoffs and win their first postseason game since Eccleston and then upset 26–1 Boston University in the semifinal to guarantee the Friars a trip to the 1978 NCAA tournament. When Boston College won the ECAC Championship Providence was given the second eastern seed, however, because BU had such a stellar season the NCAA selection committee gave them an at-large bid. Providence was forced to play the nation's top team a second time to earn a berth in the national semifinal and, with the Terriers looking for revenge, Providence couldn't pull off the upset a second time. Despite the setback success stayed with the Friars and PC made the conference tournament each of the following six seasons. Lamoriello got the team to post its first 20-win season in 1979–80 and followed that up with a surprising tournament championship. Unfortunately the Friars still could not win a tournament game and were swept out by Michigan State in the quarterfinals. After a second 20-win season Lamoriello was promoted to Athletic director in 1982 but remained as coach for another season while he found a suitable replacement. In his final season the Friars demolished the previous program by posting 33 wins, albeit with 9 games more than they had ever played, and finished atop the conference for the second time. Lamoriello's team finished as the conference tournament runner-up and made the NCAA tournament where they finally managed to win a game, sweeping Minnesota–Duluth out of the quarterfinals. Providence was stymied by Wisconsin in the semifinal but the team redeemed itself with a 3rd-place finish.

=== Hockey East ===
Steve Stirling was introduced as the new coach the following year and kept on rolling with another 20+ win season. In 1984 all 6 teams in the East Division and Lowell left the conference and formed Hockey East. While Providence was mostly a middling team that season, when the playoffs came around, junior goaltender Chris Terreri came into his own. After allowing 2 goals in the two quarterfinal games against Northeastern, Terreri shut down Boston University in the semifinal and led the Friars against Hockey East champion Boston College in the championship. Terreri held one of the nation's top offensive teams to a single goal in his 65-save masterpiece as Providence won in double overtime. Allowing just 5 goals in four and a half games was an astounding effort, especially at a time when most teams were routinely scoring 4 goals per game.

Terreri continued his MVP performance in the NCAA tournament when the Friars were pitted against Michigan State. The Spartans were the best team all season and entered the tournament having just tied the record for the most wins in a season. In the first game, despite the Spartans potent offense, they only managed to win the game by a single goal, leaving the door open for the Friars in the rematch. Terreri held Michigan State to 2 goals, making 83 saves in the two games, and allowing the 4 his team scored to earn them a trip into the semifinals as one of the biggest upsets in tournament history. In the semifinal Providence met Boston College once more and the two teams battled in a lopsided game. While Terreri was bombarded by shots, BC's Scott Gordon had a much easier time but the teams remained tied after regulation. This time it took three overtime periods and with the Terreri setting an NCAA record for saves in a Frozen Four game (stall a record as of 2019) the Friars won the game and made their first championship appearance. Terreri was again stellar in the final game against Rensselaer, allowing 2 goals on 42 shots, but this time his team couldn't support him offensively and the Friars lost 1–2. Despite the loss, the astounding performance by Terreri (2.14 GAA, .949 sv%) earned him Tournament MOP honors, the only losing player to win the award since 1960.

=== Middling results ===
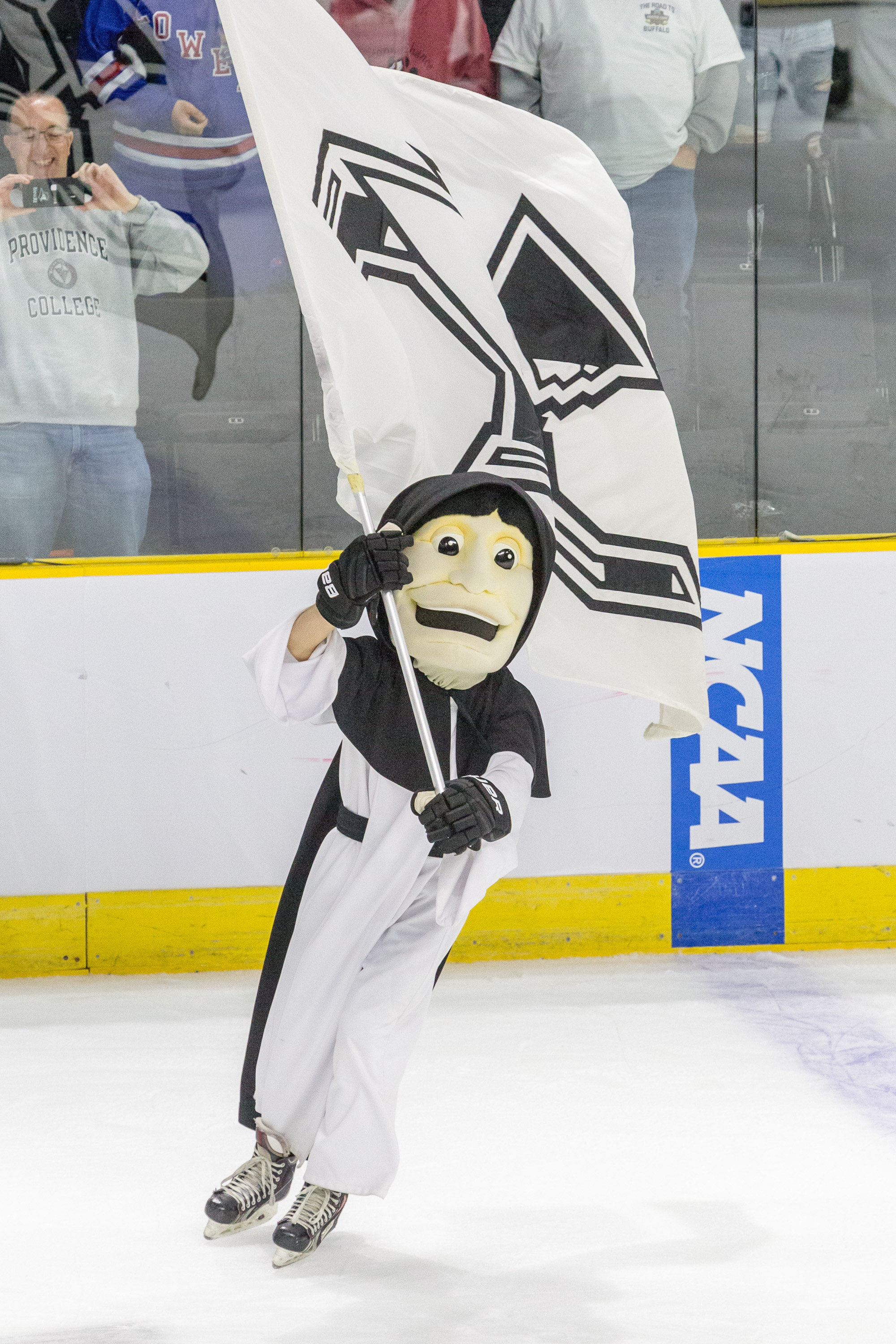
Friar Dom, wearing the traditional cowl of the Dominican brothers, was adopted as the PC Athletics mascot in 2002

After the spectacular finish the team suffered a blow when Stirling resigned to return to Division III Babson and he was replaced by Mike McShane. McShane's tenure was neither good nor bad for the Friars as the team finished with a ~.500 record in his nine seasons but early on Providence lost their leading figure when Lou Lamoriello became the team president for the New Jersey Devils. The Friars continued on with McShane leading them to four consecutive 20+ win seasons in the early 1990s but he was eventually replaced by Paul Pooley in 1994. Early on Pooley looked to be the man to lead the Friars, guiding the team to its second Hockey East tournament title in 1996 but the results soon turned and his tenure with Providence ended with 4 straight conference quarterfinal losses.

After Pooley Providence brought back a name from its past, hoping that Tim Army would be able to succeed as Lamoriello one had, but in six seasons Army produced just one winning campaign (his first) and Providence missed out on the playoffs entirely in his final three years.

=== Return to prominence ===
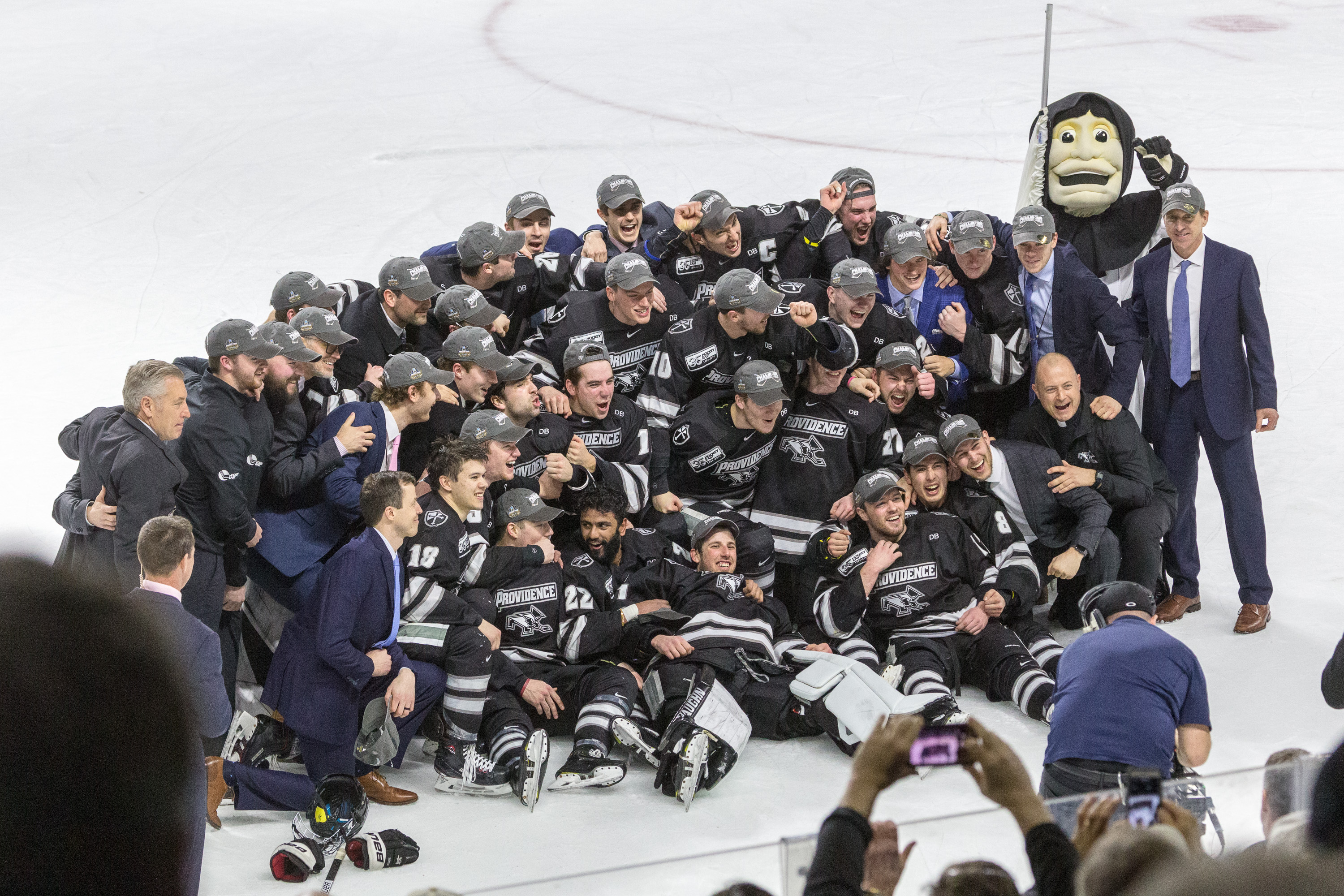
Friars pose after winning the NCAA Hockey East Regional at the Dunkin’ Donuts Center, March 31, 2019

In 2011 former Union bench boss Nate Leaman was brought in and the team responded by winning its first playoff round in over a decade. By year two the team had a winning record and in the third season Leaman had led Providence to its first 20+ win year since 2001. In 2015, led by junior goaltender Jon Gillies, Providence won 26 games (the most since 1983) and finished tied for second in Hockey East. Despite this the team was upset in the quarterfinals by New Hampshire and had to wait to see if they could get in on the strength of their record. The Friars did manage to secure of one the last at-large berths and opened the tournament against 4th overall seeded Miami. Providence posted an enormous 4-goal second period in their backyard to build a 6–2 lead but the RedHawks came storming back with three extra-attacker goals late in the third. Brandon Tanev ended the comeback bid with an empty-netter to advance Providence to the Regional Final. After the first game jitters Gillies appeared to find his game and limited Denver and Omaha to a single goal each in the next two contests to lead Providence back to the National Championship game. 30 years after their first title tilt it appears that Providence would again lose out but after BU netminder Matt O'Connor dropped the puck into his own net to tie the game the momentum swing in the Friars' direction allowing Tanev to score the game-winning goal just over two minutes later.

Leaman continues to lead the Friars and had led the program to six consecutive tournament berths winning at least one game in four of those years. Leaman currently sits 3rd all-time in program wins and is #1 in winning percentage (as of 2019).

== Season-by-season results ==
Source:

== Records vs. current Hockey East teams ==
As of the completion of 2018–19 season

School	Team	Away Arena	Overall record	Win %	Home	Away	Last Result
Boston College	Eagles	Conte Forum	52–118–14	.321	27–47–11	21–67–3	-
Boston University	Terriers	Agganis Arena	57–110–18	.357	32–47–8	21–59–10	-
University of Connecticut	Huskies	Toscano Family Ice Forum	9–2–2	.769	5–2–1	4–0–1	-
University of Maine	Black Bears	Alfond Arena	55–65–7	.461	32–25–2	19–40–4	-
University of Massachusetts Amherst	Minutemen	Mullins Center	48–27–6	.630	32–11–1	16–15–5	-
University of Massachusetts Lowell	River Hawks	Tsongas Center	60–47–11	.555	32–23–4	28–22–7	-
Merrimack College	Warriors	J. Thom Lawler Rink	90–32–12	.716	54–15–4	37–17–7	-
University of New Hampshire	Wildcats	Whittemore Center	62–90–16	.417	38–33–10	24–54–6	-
Northeastern University	Huskies	Matthews Arena	87–54–18	.604	44–22–8	39–31–10	-
University of Vermont	Catamounts	Gutterson Fieldhouse	26–28–9	.484	11–11–7	14–15–2	-

== All-time coaching records ==
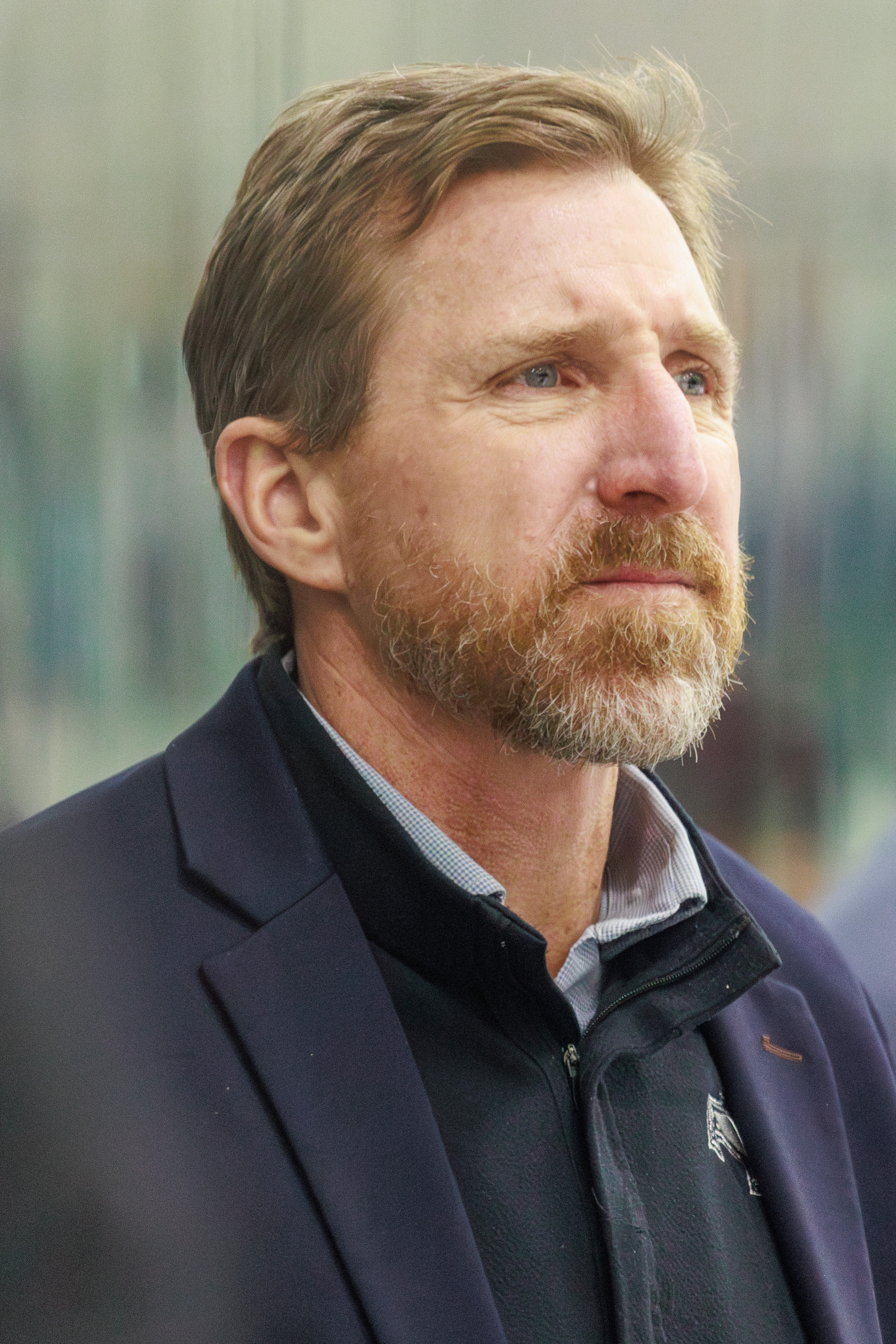
Nate Leaman

As of completion of 2024–25 season

Tenure	Coach	Years	Record	Pct.
1926–1927	Dr. Joseph T. Landry	1†	1–1–0	.500
1926–1927	John Graham	1†	0–4–0	.000
1926–1927	Clement Trihey	1†	0–2–0	.000
1952–1956	Dick Rondeau	4	25–41–0	.379
1956–1964	Tom Eccleston	8	94–72–5	.564
1964–1968	Zellio Toppazzini	4	31–60–1	.342
1968–1983	Lou Lamoriello	15	248–179–13	.578
1983–1985	Steve Stirling	2	44–29–7	.594
1985–1994	Mike McShane	9	151–153–25	.497
1994–2005	Paul Pooley	11	185–187–40	.498
2005–2011	Tim Army	6	66–116–28	.381
2011–Present	Nate Leaman	14	280–174–67	.602
Totals	12 coaches	74 Seasons	1,125–1,018–186	.523

† Providence had 3 people serve as head coach during their first season

== Statistical leaders ==
=== Career points leaders ===
Player	Years	GP	G	A	Pts	PIM
Ron Wilson	1973–1977	111	78	172	250	
Gaetano Orlando	1980–1984	133	95	118	213	
Rob Gaudreau	1988–1992	146	103	108	211	
Mike Boback	1988–1992	131	73	128	201	
Kurt Kleinendorst	1979–1983	138	89	103	192	
Tim Army	1981–1985	151	71	93	179	
Dan Kennedy	1972–1976	105	75	93	168	
Chad Quenneville	1991–1995	143	78	89	167	
Steve O'Neill	1977–1981	117	74	90	164	
Brad Wilson	1975–1979	87	63	96	159	
Gord Cruickshank	1984–1988	145	99	60	159	

=== Career goaltending leaders ===
GP = Games played; Min = Minutes played; W = Wins; L = Losses; T = Ties; GA = Goals against; SO = Shutouts; SV% = Save percentage; GAA = Goals against average

Minimum 35 of team's games

Player	Years	GP	Min	W	L	T	GA	SO	SV%	GAA
Nick Ellis	2013–2016	48	2716	30	9	5	86	5	.931	1.90
Hayden Hawkey	2015–2019	125	7321	72	36	13	247	16	.918	2.02
Jon Gillies	2012–2015	108	6433	60	34	13	223	13	.931	2.08
Jaxson Stauber	2020–2022	60	3597	32	21	7	129	8	.919	2.15
Michael Lackey	2016–2020	76	4382	35	28	11	176	3	.914	2.41

Statistics current through the end of the 2022–23 season.

== Current roster ==
As of August 28, 2025.

No.	Nat.	Player	Class	Pos	Height	Weight	DoB	Hometown	Previous team	NHL rights
2	(Czech Republic)	Tomas Machů	Sophomore	D	6' 4" (1.93 m)	194 lb (88 kg)	2003-03-02	Ostrava, Czech Republic	Youngstown Phantoms (USHL)	NYI, 221st overall 2021
6	(United States)	Alexander Bales	Sophomore	D	5' 10" (1.78 m)	181 lb (82 kg)	2006-07-06	East Amherst, New York	Tri-City Storm (USHL)	—
9	(Canada)	Hudson Malinoski	Junior	F	6' 1" (1.85 m)	184 lb (83 kg)	2004-05-19	Saskatoon, Saskatchewan	Brooks Bandits (AJHL)	TOR, 153rd overall 2023
10	(United States)	Donovan McCoy	Freshman	D	6' 1" (1.85 m)	205 lb (93 kg)	2004-10-11	Belleville, Ontario	Sudbury Wolves (OHL)	—
11	(Canada)	Graham Gamache	Junior	F	5' 11" (1.8 m)	179 lb (81 kg)	2002-06-11	Edmonton, Alberta	Tri-City Storm (USHL)	—
13	(United States)	Geno McEnery	Sophomore	F	6' 0" (1.83 m)	190 lb (86 kg)	2003-10-21	Geneva, Illinois	Oklahoma Warriors (NAHL)	—
14	(Finland)	Aleksi Kivioja	Sophomore	F	6' 5" (1.96 m)	220 lb (100 kg)	2003-08-02	Helsinki, Finland	Omaha Lancers (USHL)	—
15	(United States)	Will Elger	Sophomore	F	6' 2" (1.88 m)	174 lb (79 kg)	2004-12-29	Westerville, Ohio	Omaha Lancers (USHL)	—
16	(Canada)	Jonathan Fauchon	Freshman	F	5' 11" (1.8 m)	176 lb (80 kg)	2004-01-13	Sainte-Claire, Quebec	Rimouski Océanic (QMJHL)	—
17	(Canada)	Beau Jelsma	Freshman	F	5' 10" (1.78 m)	181 lb (82 kg)	2004-04-28	London, Ontario	Barrie Colts (OHL)	—
18	(Canada)	Brendan Ross	Sophomore	F	6' 3" (1.91 m)	187 lb (85 kg)	2003-07-08	Calgary, Alberta	Alaska (NCAA)	—
19	(United States)	Tanner Adams	Junior	F	5' 11" (1.8 m)	185 lb (84 kg)	2005-09-02	Northport, New York	Tri-City Storm (USHL)	—
20	(Canada)	Kale McCallum	Junior	D	5' 11" (1.8 m)	183 lb (83 kg)	2002-02-14	Fredericton, New Brunswick	New Brunswick (AUS)	—
21	(Canada)	John Mustard	Sophomore	F	6' 1" (1.85 m)	185 lb (84 kg)	2006-08-16	Newmarket, Ontario	Waterloo Black Hawks (USHL)	CHI, 67th overall 2024
22	(United States)	Clint Levens	Junior	F	6' 2" (1.88 m)	189 lb (86 kg)	2003-06-19	Windermere, Florida	Sioux Falls Stampede (USHL)	—
23	(United States)	Andrew Centrella	Junior	D	5' 9" (1.75 m)	177 lb (80 kg)	2004-01-29	Philadelphia, Pennsylvania	Youngstown Phantoms (USHL)	—
24	(United States)	Quinn Mantei	Freshman	D	6' 0" (1.83 m)	187 lb (85 kg)	2005-04-23	Weyburn, Saskatchewan	Brandon Wheat Kings (WHL)	—
26	(Germany)	Julius Sumpf	Freshman	F	6' 2" (1.88 m)	190 lb (86 kg)	2005-01-11	München, Germany	Moncton Wildcats (QMJHL)	CHI, 98th overall 2025
27	(Russia)	Alex Rybakov	Freshman	D	6' 2" (1.88 m)	190 lb (86 kg)	2005-01-14	Chelyabinsk, Russia	Sioux Falls Stampede (USHL)	—
28	(Czech Republic)	Martin Masa	Freshman	D	6' 2" (1.88 m)	194 lb (88 kg)	2005-07-14	Brno, Czech Republic	Cedar Rapids RoughRiders (USHL)	—
29	(Canada)	Roger McQueen	Freshman	F	6' 6" (1.98 m)	198 lb (90 kg)	2006-10-02	Saskatoon, Saskatchewan	Brandon Wheat Kings (WHL)	ANA, 10th overall 2025
30	(United States)	Jack Parsons	Freshman	G	6' 4" (1.93 m)	194 lb (88 kg)	2006-01-15	Ithaca, New York	Chicago Steel (USHL)	—
33	(United States)	Aaron Matthews	Freshman	G	6' 4" (1.93 m)	170 lb (77 kg)	2004-03-06	Newton, Massachusetts	Rockets Hockey Club (NCDC)	—
34	(Canada)	Logan Sawyer	Sophomore	F	6' 1" (1.85 m)	174 lb (79 kg)	2006-05-06	Orangeville, Ontario	Brooks Bandits (BCHL)	MTL, 78th overall 2024
35	(Sweden)	Philip Svedebäck	Senior	G	6' 4" (1.93 m)	210 lb (95 kg)	2002-05-28	Växjö, Sweden	Dubuque Fighting Saints (USHL)	BOS, 117th overall 2021

== Awards and honors ==
=== Hockey Hall of Fame ===
- Lou Lamoriello (2009)

=== United States Hockey Hall of Fame ===
- Dick Rondeau (1985)
- Lou Lamoriello (2014)
- Ron Wilson (2017)

=== NCAA ===
==== Individual awards ====
Spencer Penrose Award

- Tom Eccleston: 1964

NCAA Division I Ice Hockey Scoring Champion

- Jack Dugan: 2020

Tim Taylor Award

- Jon Gillies: 2013

Derek Hines Unsung Hero Award

- Kyle Murphy: 2013

Tournament Most Outstanding Player

- Chris Terreri: 1985
- Jon Gillies: 2015

==== All-American teams ====
AHCA First Team All-Americans

- 1963–64: Larry Kish, D
- 1964–65: Grant Heffernan, F
- 1974–75: Ron Wilson, D
- 1975–76: Ron Wilson, D
- 1982–83: Randy Velischek, D; Kurt Kleinendorst, F
- 1984–85: Chris Terreri, G; Tim Army, F
- 2015–16: Jake Walman, D
- 2019–20: Jack Dugan, F

AHCA Second Team All-Americans

- 1983–84: Peter Taglianetti, D; Gaetano Orlando, F
- 1984–85: Peter Taglianetti, D
- 1985–86: Chris Terreri, G
- 1987–88: Gord Cruickshank, F
- 1988–89: Rick Bennett, F
- 1991–92: Rob Gaudreau, F
- 1993–94: Chad Quenneville, F
- 1994–95: Chad Quenneville, F
- 2000–01: Nolan Schaefer, G; Devin Rask, F
- 2003–04: Stephen Wood, F
- 2012–13: Jon Gillies, G
- 2014–15: Jon Gillies, G
- 2015–16: Mark Jankowski, F
- 2016–17: Jake Walman, F
- 2017–18: Jacob Bryson, F
- 2018–19: Josh Wilkins, F

=== ECAC Hockey ===
==== Individual awards ====
Player of the Year

- Ron Wilson: 1975
- Randy Velischek: 1983

Rookie of the Year

- Ron Wilson: 1974

Most Outstanding Player in tournament

- Kurt Kleinendorst: 1981

==== All-Conference teams ====
First Team All-ECAC Hockey

- 1962–63: Larry Kish, D
- 1963–64: Larry Kish, D; Grant Heffernan, F; Ray Mooney, F
- 1964–65: Grant Heffernan, F
- 1974–75: Ron Wilson, D
- 1975–76: Ron Wilson, D
- 1981–82: Scot Kleinendorst, D
- 1982–83: Randy Velischek, D; Kurt Kleinendorst, F
- 1983–84: Gaetano Orlando, F

Second Team All-ECAC Hockey

- 1961–62: Joe McGeough, D; Marsh Tschida, F
- 1962–63: Lou Lamoriello, F
- 1963–64: John Keough, F
- 1976–77: Ron Wilson, D
- 1978–79: Jim Korn, D; Colin Ahern, F
- 1979–80: Scot Kleinendorst, D; Steve O'Neill, F
- 1981–82: Randy Velischek, D; Kurt Kleinendorst, F
- 1982–83: Paul Guay, F
- 1983–84: Peter Taglianetti, D

=== Hockey East ===
==== Individual awards ====
Player of the Year

- Chris Terreri: 1985

Best Defensive Defenseman

- Vincent Desharnais: 2019

Goaltending champions

- Chris Terreri: 1985
- Jon Gillies: 2015

Coach of the Year

- Paul Pooley: 2001
- Nate Leaman: 2016

Best Defensive Forward

- Travis Dillabough: 1997
- Tim Schaller: 2013
- Ross Mauermann: 2014
- Noel Acciari: 2015
- Brian Pinho: 2018

Len Ceglarski Award

- Jon DiSalvatore: 2002
- Ross Mauermann: 2014
- Jacob Bryson: 2018, 2019

Rookie of the Year

- Rob Gaudreau: 1989
- Craig Darby: 1992
- Jon Gillies: 2013

Tournament Most Valuable Player

- Chris Terreri: 1985
- Bob Bell: 1995
- Joe Hulbig: 1996

==== All-Conference teams ====
First Team

- 1984–85: Chris Terreri, G; Peter Taglianetti, D; Tim Army, F
- 1988–89: Jim Hughes, D
- 1989–90: Mike Boback, F
- 1991–92: Rob Gaudreau, D; Mike Boback, F
- 1994–95: Chad Quenneville, F
- 1995–96: Dan Dennis, D
- 2000–01: Devin Rask, F
- 2003–04: Stephen Wood, D
- 2012–13: Jon Gillies, G
- 2014–15: Jon Gillies, G
- 2015–16: Jake Walman, D; Mark Jankowski, F
- 2016–17: Jake Walman, F
- 2017–18: Jacob Bryson, D; Erik Foley, F
- 2018–19: Josh Wilkins, F

Second Team

- 1985–86: Gord Cruickshank, F
- 1986–87: Gord Cruickshank, F
- 1989–90: Jeff Serowik, D; Rick Bennett, F
- 1990–91: Rob Gaudreau, F
- 1992–93: Chris Therien, D
- 1998–99: Mike Omicioli, D
- 2000–01: Nolan Schaefer, G; Matt Libby, D
- 2002–03: Stephen Wood, D
- 2007–08: Matt Taormina, D
- 2017–18: Hayden Hawkey, G
- 2018–19: Jacob Bryson, D

Third Team

- 2017–18: Brian Pinho, F
- 2018–19: Brandon Duhaime, F
- 2021–22: Max Crozier, D; Brett Berard, F

Rookie Team

- 1984–85: Shawn Whitham, D; Paul Cavallini, D
- 1986–87: Matt Merten, G; Rick Bennett, F
- 1988–89: Shaun Kane, D; Rob Gaudreau, F
- 1990–91: Chris Therien, D
- 1991–92: Craig Darby, F
- 1997–98: Boyd Ballard, G
- 1999–00: Peter Fregoe, F
- 2000–01: Regan Kelly, D
- 2003–04: Colin McDonald, F
- 2005–06: Cody Wild, D
- 2006–07: Mark Fayne, D
- 2011–12: Ross Mauermann, F
- 2012–13: Jon Gillies, G
- 2018–19: Jack Dugan, F

== Olympians ==
This is a list of Providence alumni were a part of an Olympic team.

Name	Position	Providence Tenure	Team	Year	Finish
Paul Guay	Right Wing	1981–1983	(United States) USA	1984	7th
Chris Terreri	Goaltender	1982–1986	(United States) USA	1988	7th
Chris Therien	Defenseman	1990–1993	(Canada) CAN	1994	Silver
Nick Saracino	Left Wing	2012–2016	(Italy) ITA	2026	12th

== Providence Friars Hall of Fame ==
The following is a list of people associated with the Providence men's ice hockey program who were elected into the Providence College Athletic Hall of Fame.

- Tim Army
- J. Robert Bellemore
- Mike Boback
- Brian Burke
- Edward Conaty
- Tom Eccleston
- Rob Gaudreau
- Grant Heffernan
- Dan Kennedy
- Larry Kish
- Kurt Kleinendorst
- Lou Lamoriello
- John Marchetti
- Ed Monahan
- Gaetano Orlando
- Richard Pumple
- Chad Quenneville
- Robert Reall
- Herman Schneider
- Peter Taglianetti
- Chris Terreri
- Marshall Tschida
- Randy Velischek
- Brad Wilson
- Randy Wilson
- Ron Wilson

== Friars in the NHL ==
As of July 1, 2025.

= NHL All-Star team	= NHL All-Star	= NHL All-Star and NHL All-Star team	= Hall of Famers

Player	Position	Team(s)	Years	Games	Stanley Cups
Noel Acciari	Center	BOS, FLA, STL, TOR, PIT	2015–Present	518	0
Rick Bennett	Left Wing	NYR	1989–1992	15	0
Brett Berard	Left Wing	NYR	2024–Present	35	0
Kasper Björkqvist	Right Wing	PIT	2021–2022	6	0
Jacob Bryson	Defenseman	BUF	2020–Present	254	0
Michael Callahan	Defenseman	BOS	2024–Present	17	0
Jock Callander	Center	PIT, TBL	1987–1993	109	1
Paul Cavallini	Defenseman	WSH, STL, DAL	1987–1996	564	0
Rich Costello	Forward	TOR	1983–1986	12	0
Max Crozier	Defenseman	TBL	2023–Present	18	0
Craig Darby	Center	MTL, NYI, PHI, NJD	1996–2004	196	0
Vincent Desharnais	Defenseman	EDM, VAN, PIT, SJS	2022–Present	165	0
Jon DiSalvatore	Left Wing	STL, MIN	2005–2012	6	0
Brandon Duhaime	Right Wing	MIN, COL, WSH	2021–Present	293	0
Riley Duran	Center	BOS	2024–Present	2	0
Mike Farrell	Right Wing	WSH, NSH	2001–2004	13	0
Mark Fayne	Defenseman	NJD, EDM	2010–2017	389	0
Tom Fitzgerald	Left Wing	NYI, FLA, COL, NSH, CHI, TOR, BOS	1988–2006	1,097	0
Parker Ford	Center	WIN	2024–Present	3	0
Rob Gaudreau	Right Wing	SJS, OTT	1992–1996	231	0
Hal Gill	Defenseman	BOS, TOR, PIT, MTL, NSH, PHI	1997–2014	1,108	1
Jon Gillies	Goaltender	CGY, STL, NJD, CBJ	2016–2023	35	0
John Gilmour	Defenseman	NYR	2017–2020	37	0
Paul Guay	Right Wing	PHI, LAK, BOS, NYI	1983–1991	117	0
Joe Hulbig	Left Wing	EDM, BOS	1996–2001	55	0

Player	Position	Team(s)	Years	Games	Stanley Cups
Mark Jankowski	Left Wing	CGY, PIT, BUF, NSH, CAR	2016–Present	414	0
Dave Kelly	Forward	DET	1976–1977	16	0
Scot Kleinendorst	Right Wing	NYR, HFD, WSH	1982–1990	281	0
Jim Korn	Defenseman	DET, TOR, BUF, NJD, CGY	1980–1990	596	0
Jay Leach	Defenseman	BOS, TBL, NJD, MTL, SJS	2005–2011	70	0
Colin McDonald	Right Wing	EDM, PIT, NYI, PHI	2009–2017	148	0
Gaetano Orlando	Forward	BUF	1984–1987	98	0
Brian Pinho	Center	WSH	2019–2021	2	0
Fernando Pisani	Right Wing	EDM, CHI	2009–2017	462	0
Jon Rheault	Right Wing	FLA	2012–2013	5	0
Kevin Rooney	Center	NJD, NYR, CGY	2016–Present	330	0
Steve Rooney	Forward	MTL, WPG, NJD	1984–1989	154	1
Nolan Schaefer	Goaltender	SJS	2005–2006	7	0
Tim Schaller	Center	BUF, BOS, VAN, LAK	2014–2020	276	0
Jeff Serowik	Defenseman	TOR, BOS, PIT	1990–1999	28	0
Jaxson Stauber	Goaltender	CHI, UTA	2022–Present	12	0
Peter Taglianetti	Right Wing	WPG, MNS, PIT, TBL	1984–1995	451	2
Brandon Tanev	Left Wing	WIN, PIT, SEA	2015–Present	552	0
Matt Taormina	Defenseman	NJD, TBL	2010–2016	59	0
Chris Terreri	Goaltender	NJD, SJS, CHI, NYI	1986–2001	406	2
Chris Therien	Defenseman	PHI, DAL	1994–2006	764	0
Tyce Thompson	Right Wing	NJD	2020–2023	11	0
Randy Velischek	Defenseman	MNS, NJD, QUE	1982–1992	509	0
Jake Walman	Defenseman	STL, DET, SJS, EDM	2019–Present	267	0
Ron Wilson	Defenseman	TOR, MNS	1977–1988	177	0

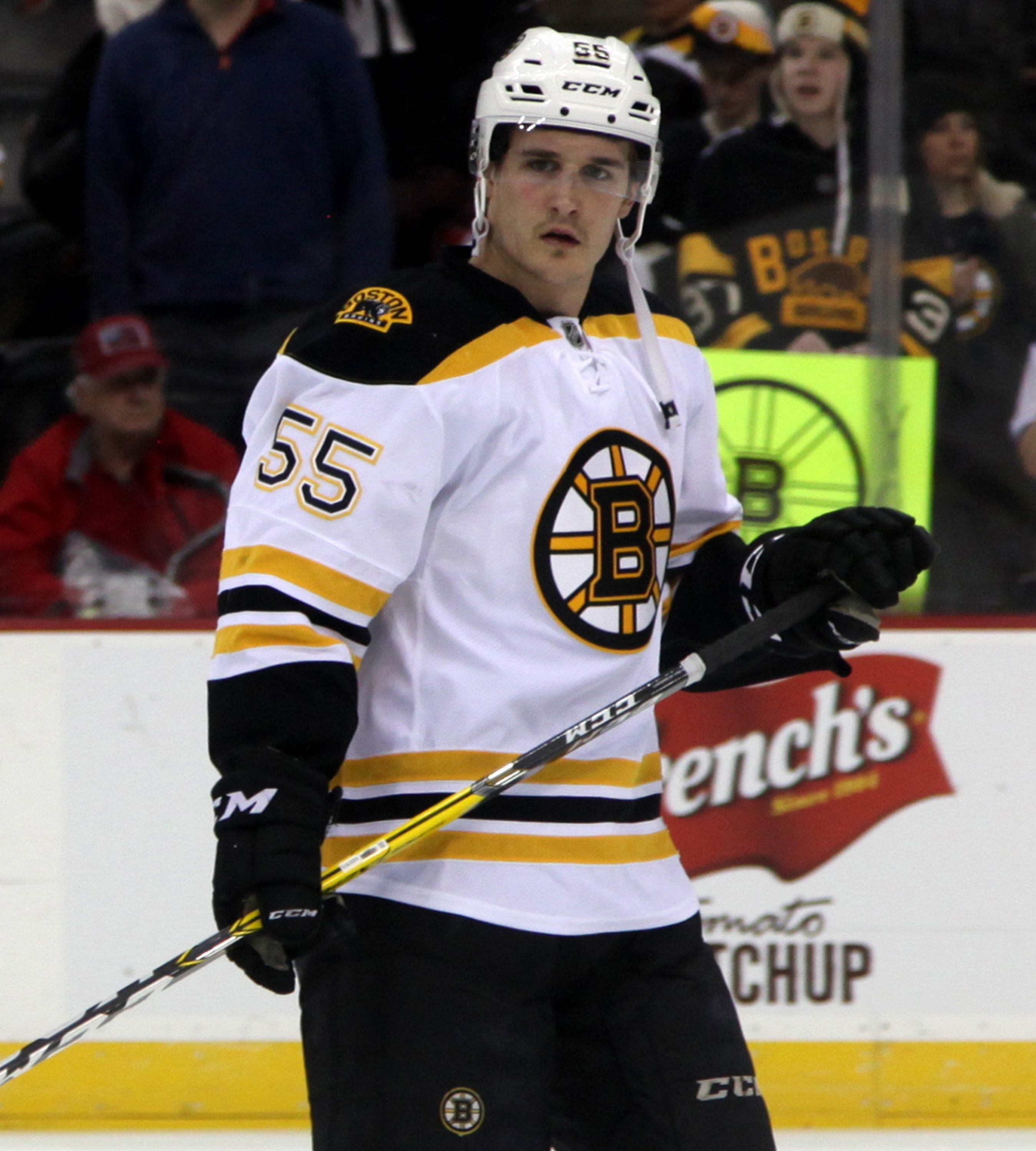
Noel Acciari

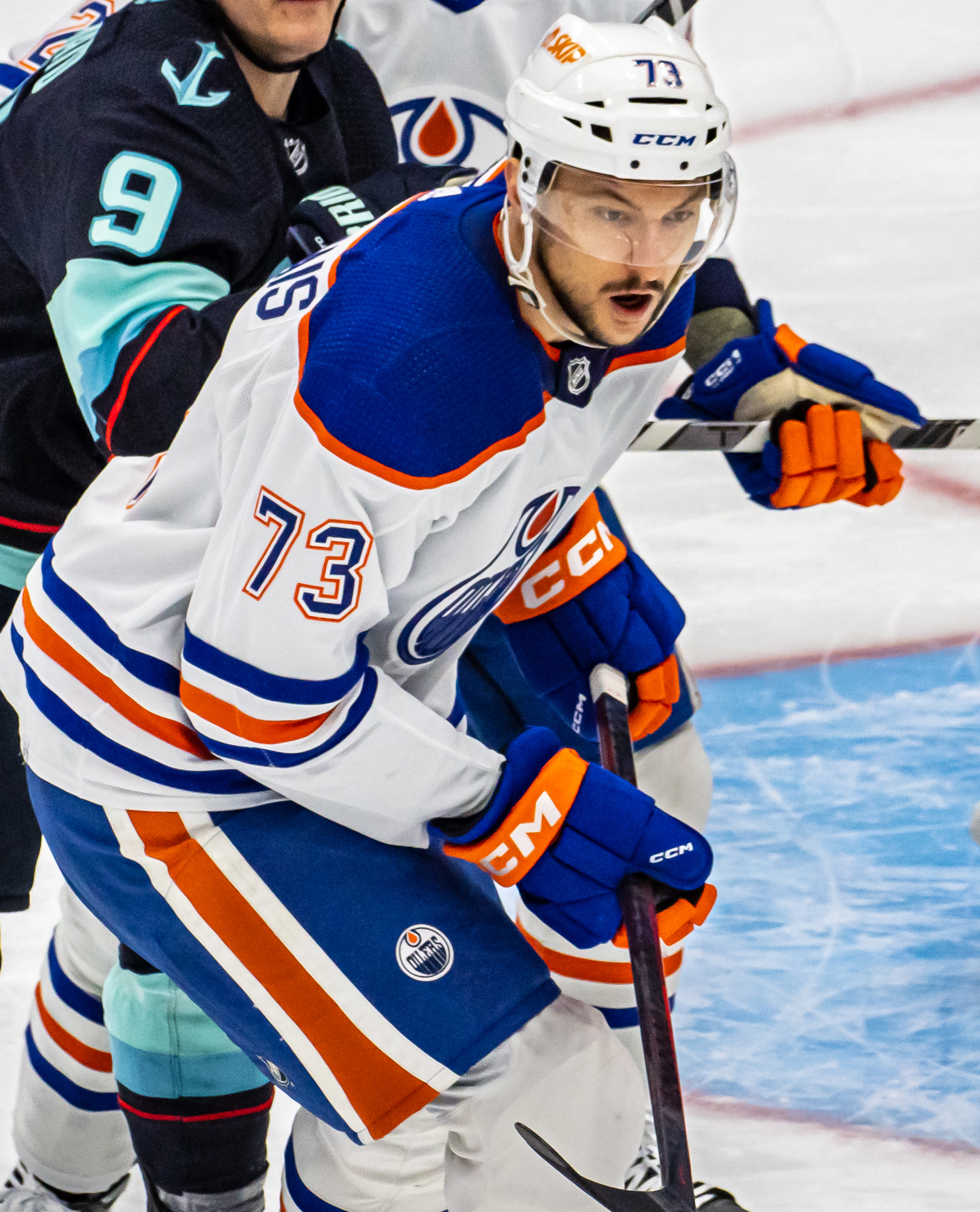
Vincent Desharnais

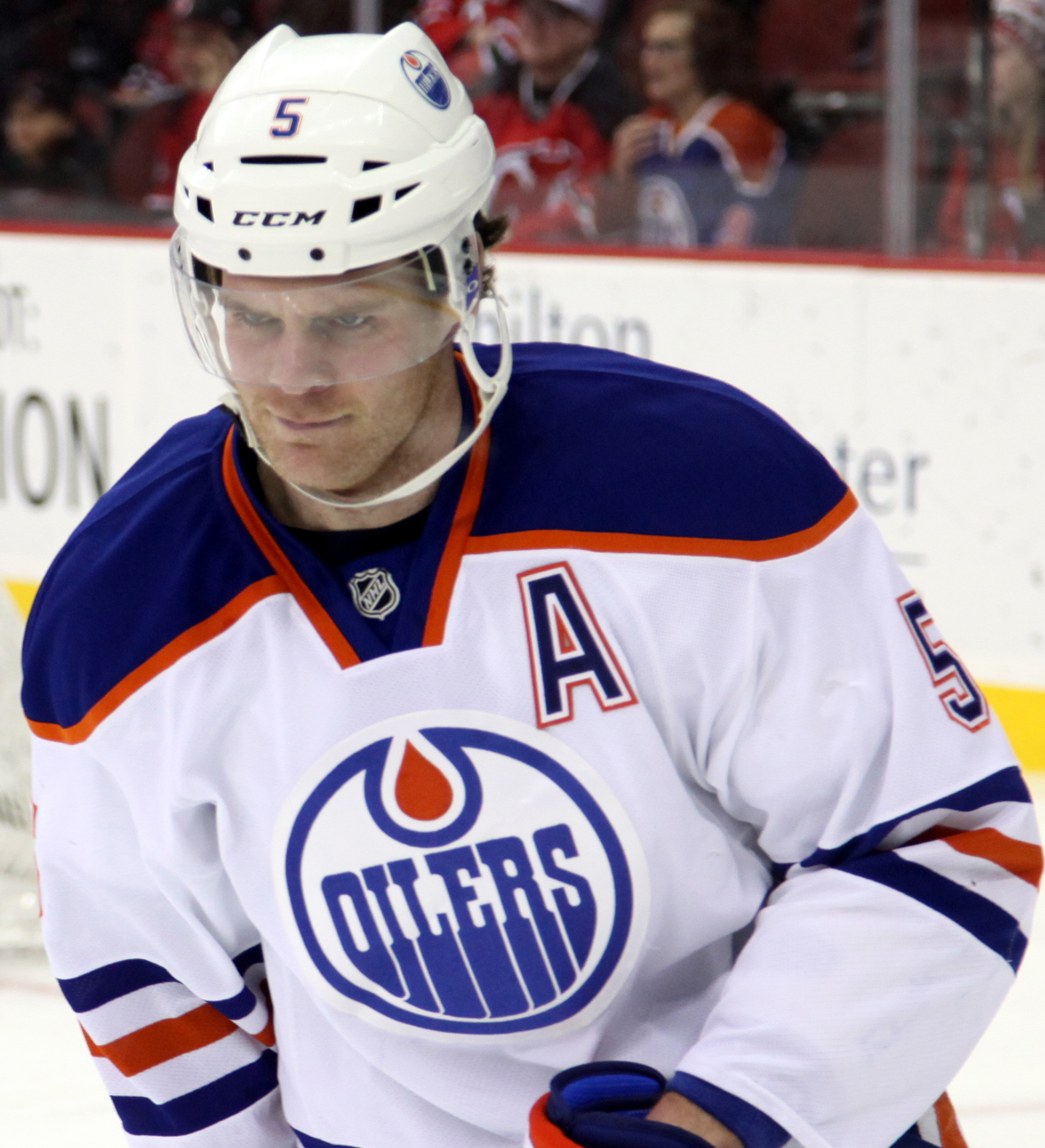
Mark Fayne

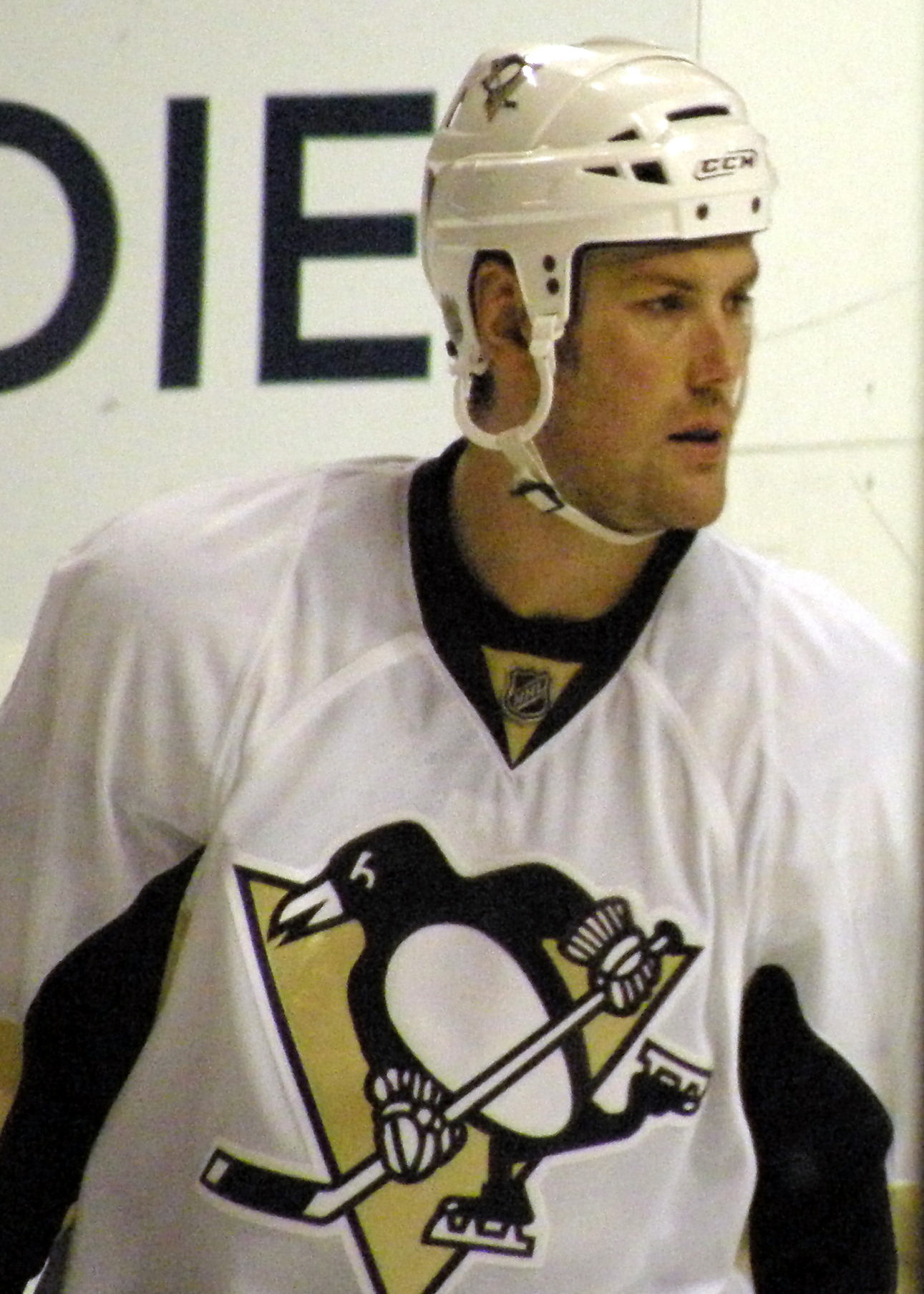
Hal Gill

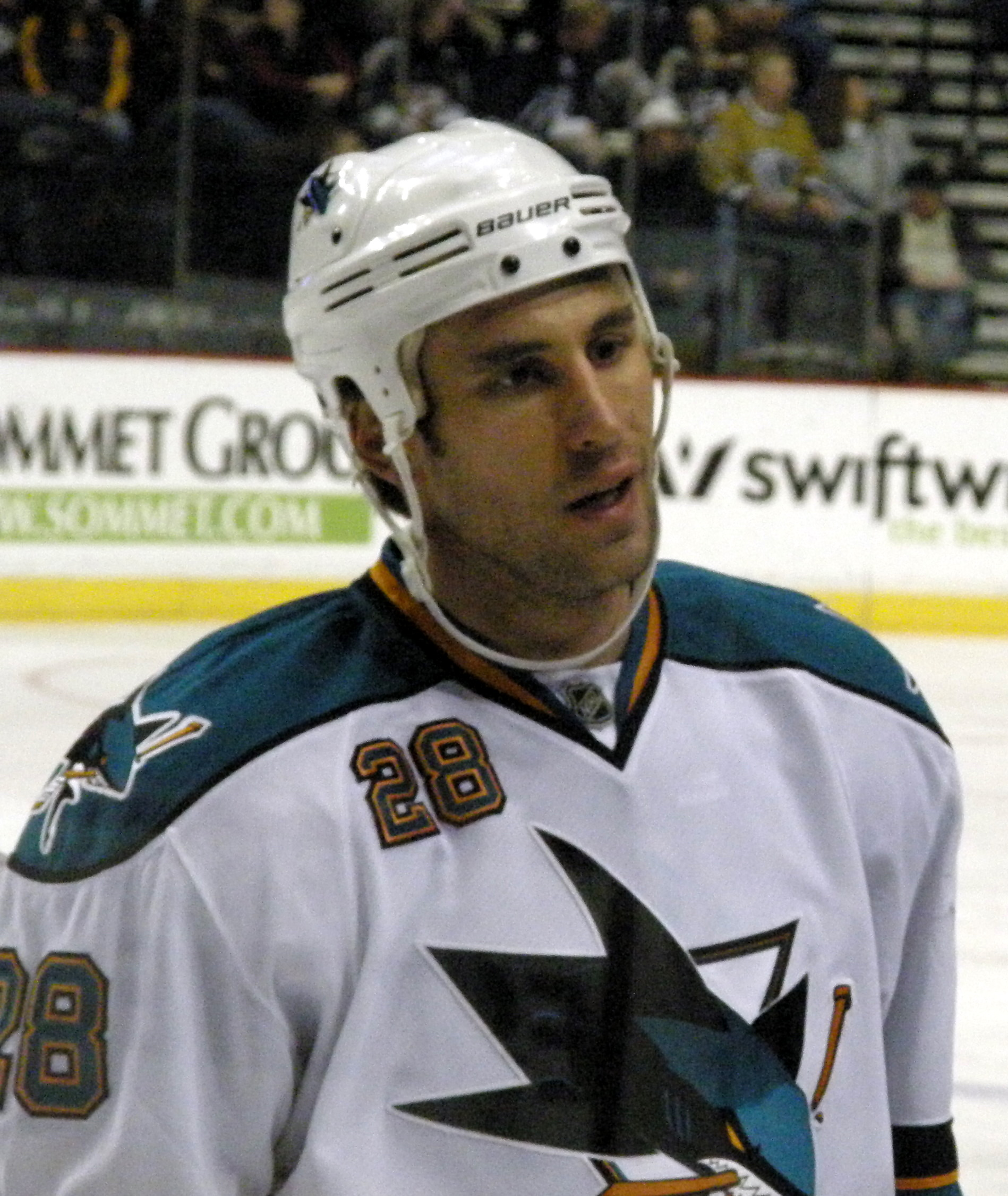
Jay Leach

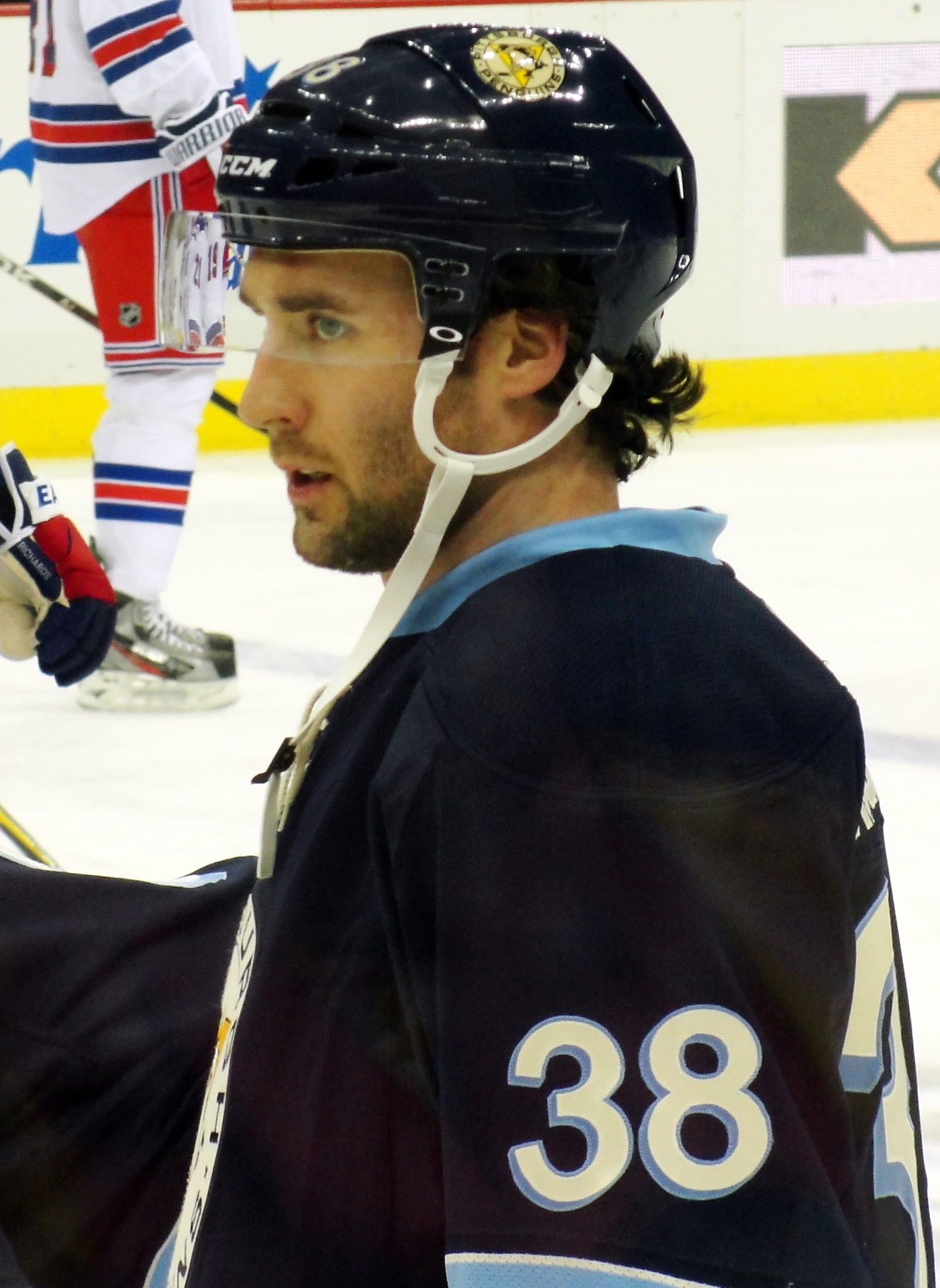
Colin McDonald

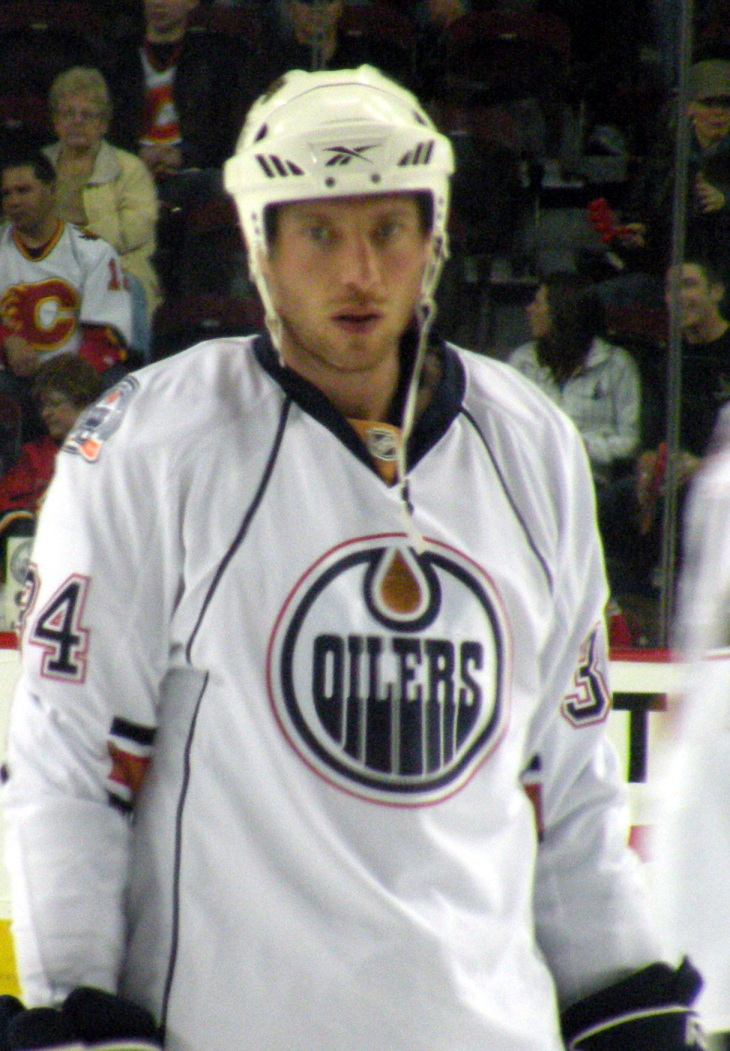
Fernando Pisani

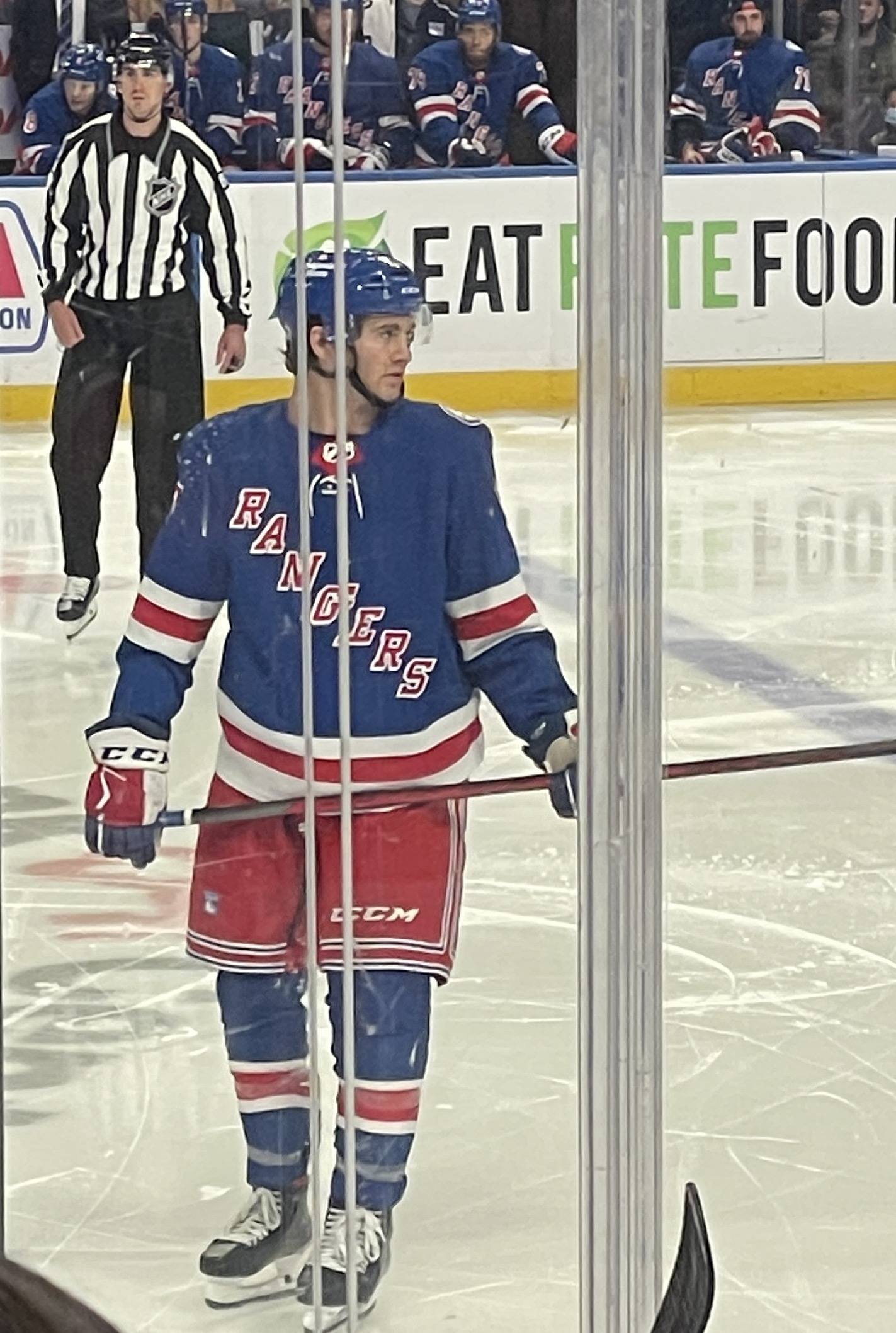
Kevin Rooney

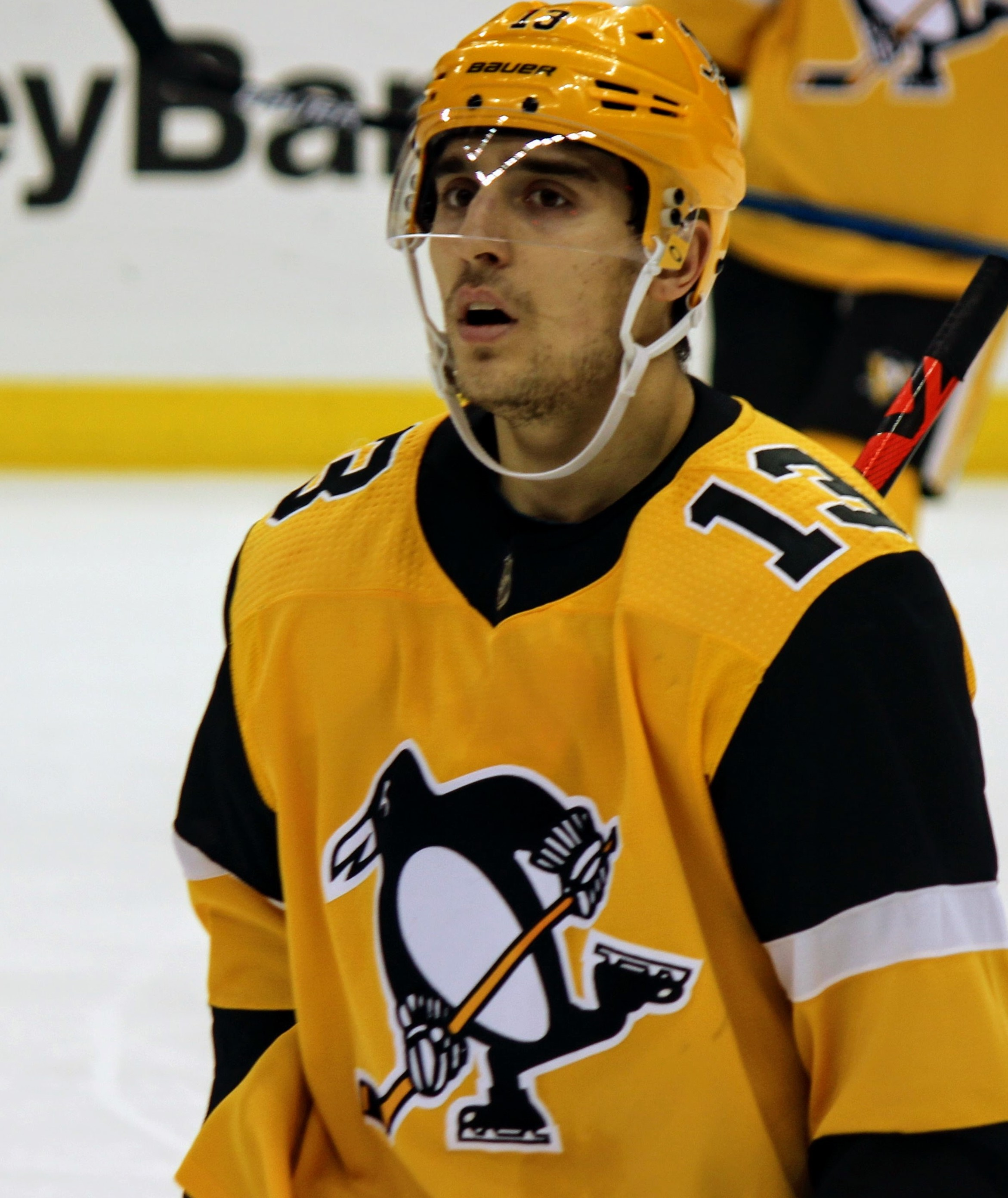
Brandon Tanev

== See also ==
- Providence Friars women's ice hockey
- Providence Friars
