= Jeff Serowik =

American ice hockey player

- Born: January 10, 1967 (age 59) Manchester, New Hampshire, U.S.
- Height: 6 ft 1 in (185 cm)
- Weight: 190 lb (86 kg; 13 st 8 lb)
- Position: Defense
- Shot: Right
- Played for: Toronto Maple Leafs; Boston Bruins; Pittsburgh Penguins
- NHL draft: 85th overall, 1985; Toronto Maple Leafs
- Playing career: 1990–2000

Jeffrey Michael Serowik (born January 10, 1967) is an American former professional ice hockey defenseman. He played 28 games in the National Hockey League with the Toronto Maple Leafs, Boston Bruins, and Pittsburgh Penguins between 1990 and 1998. The rest of his career, which lasted from 1990 to 2000, was spent in the minor leagues.

== Playing career ==
Serowik was drafted 85th overall by the Toronto Maple Leafs in the 1985 NHL entry draft and played one game for them during the 1990–91 NHL season. He mainly played in the American Hockey League for the St. John's Maple Leafs. He signed with the Florida Panthers in 1993, but spent the entire season in the International Hockey League with the Cincinnati Cyclones, thus never playing a game for the Panthers.

In 1994, Serowik signed with the Boston Bruins and played a second NHL game. Like his Toronto stint, he played mainly in the AHL, suiting up for the Providence Bruins. He signed with the Chicago Blackhawks in 1995 but never played for them, instead playing in the IHL, splitting the season with the Indianapolis Ice and the Las Vegas Thunder. He stayed in the IHL with a second year at Las Vegas and then with the Kansas City Blades.

In 1998, he signed with the Pittsburgh Penguins and got more ice time, playing 26 games and scoring 6 assists before suffering a serious head injury. He missed the rest of that season and the entire 1999–00 NHL season before eventually retiring.

== Career statistics ==
=== Regular season and playoffs ===
			Regular season					Playoffs
Season	Team	League	GP	G	A	Pts	PIM	GP	G	A	Pts	PIM
1983–84	Manchester High School West	HS-NH	21	12	22	24	—	—	—	—	—	—
1984–85	Lawrence Academy	HS-Prep	24	8	25	33	—	—	—	—	—	—
1985–86	Lawrence Academy	HS-Prep	—	—	—	—	—	—	—	—	—	—
1986–87	Providence College	HE	33	3	8	11	22	—	—	—	—	—
1987–88	Providence College	HE	33	3	9	12	44	—	—	—	—	—
1988–89	Providence College	HE	35	3	14	17	48	—	—	—	—	—
1989–90	Providence College	HE	35	6	19	25	34	—	—	—	—	—
1990–91	Toronto Maple Leafs	NHL	1	0	0	0	0	—	—	—	—	—
1990–91	Newmarket Saints	AHL	60	8	15	23	45	—	—	—	—	—
1991–92	St. John's Maple Leafs	AHL	78	11	34	45	60	16	4	9	13	22
1992–93	St. John's Maple Leafs	AHL	77	19	35	54	92	9	1	5	6	8
1993–94	Cincinnati Cyclones	IHL	79	6	21	27	98	7	0	1	1	8
1994–95	Providence Bruins	AHL	78	28	34	62	102	13	4	6	10	10
1994–95	Boston Bruins	NHL	1	0	0	0	0	—	—	—	—	—
1995–96	Indianapolis Ice	IHL	69	20	23	43	86	—	—	—	—	—
1995–96	Las Vegas Thunder	IHL	13	7	6	13	18	15	6	5	11	16
1996–97	Las Vegas Thunder	IHL	42	5	19	24	34	3	0	0	0	4
1997–98	Kansas City Blades	IHL	77	14	35	49	50	11	2	5	7	12
1998–99	Pittsburgh Penguins	NHL	26	0	6	6	16	—	—	—	—	—
AHL totals			293	66	118	184	299	38	9	20	29	40
IHL totals			280	52	104	156	286	36	8	11	19	40
NHL totals			28	0	6	6	16	—	—	—	—	—

== Awards and honors ==
Award	Year
All-Hockey East Second Team	1989–90
