= Gord Cruickshank =

Canadian ice hockey player

- Born: May 4, 1965 Mississauga, Ontario, Canada
- Died: August 9, 2021 (aged 56)
- Height: 5 ft 11 in (180 cm)
- Weight: 185 lb (84 kg; 13 st 3 lb)
- Position: Forward
- Shot: Right
- Played for: Providence; Maine Mariners; Johnstown Chiefs; Nashville Knights; Raleigh IceCaps; Greensboro Monarchs
- NHL draft: 178th, 1985; Boston Bruins
- Playing career: 1984–1992

Gordon Cruickshank (May 4, 1965 – August 9, 2021) was a Canadian ice hockey forward who was an All-American for Providence.

== Career ==
Cruickshank arrived in Providence in 1984 and had a pedestrian first season with the ice hockey team. Despite underperforming, he was selected by the Boston Bruins in the NHL Draft. Cruickshank seemed to prove the Bruins' scouts correct when he nearly tripled his point production and took over as the top offensive threat for the Friars. He was 23 goals better than the next highest teammate and was named to the second All-Conference team despite Providence finishing 10 games below .500. This trend continued through Cruickshank's final two seasons with the Friars and, though he was not able to help the team achieve much success, he was an All-American in his final college season. Cruickshank joined the Maine Mariners for the tail end of the 1988 season and prepared to continue his professional career the following season.

Just before the Bruins' training camp, Cruickshank injured his left ankle. He ended up needing surgery to fix a bone chip and was sidelined for several months. When he tried to return in February, Cruickshank was out of shape and his ankle still had not completely healed. Cruickshank lost the entire season to the injury but did return for Boston's training camp in 1989. He demonstrated the scoring touch he had in Providence and was assigned to Maine at the start of the season but he found it difficult to get into the lineup. Cruickshank played just 24 games for the Mariners before being sent down to the ECHL to finish out the year. The next season, Cruickshank was one of the top goal-scorers for the Johnstown Chiefs, finishing eighth in the league with 44 markers. Despite the performance, Cruickshank was not called up and spent his third year as a professional bouncing between three teams before retiring from hockey.

== Statistics ==
=== Regular season and playoffs ===
| | | | Regular Season | | | | | Playoffs |
| Season | Team | League | GP | G | A | Pts | PIM | GP | G | A | Pts | PIM |
|---|---|---|---|---|---|---|---|---|---|---|---|---|
| 1981–82 | Mississauga Reps (AAA) | GTHL | — | — | — | — | — | — | — | — | — | — |
| 1982–83 | St. Michael's Buzzers | MJBHL | 36 | 20 | 24 | 44 | 54 | — | — | — | — | — |
| 1984–85 | Providence | Hockey East | 40 | 8 | 9 | 17 | 32 | — | — | — | — | — |
| 1985–86 | Providence | Hockey East | 38 | 33 | 17 | 50 | 80 | — | — | — | — | — |
| 1986–87 | Providence | Hockey East | 31 | 27 | 18 | 45 | 38 | — | — | — | — | — |
| 1987–88 | Providence | Hockey East | 36 | 29 | 16 | 45 | 31 | — | — | — | — | — |
| 1987–88 | Maine Mariners | AHL | 4 | 1 | 1 | 2 | 0 | — | — | — | — | — |
| 1989–90 | Maine Mariners | AHL | 24 | 9 | 8 | 17 | 16 | — | — | — | — | — |
| 1989–90 | Johnstown Chiefs | ECHL | 5 | 3 | 4 | 7 | 2 | — | — | — | — | — |
| 1990–91 | Johnstown Chiefs | ECHL | 57 | 44 | 33 | 77 | 112 | 8 | 2 | 3 | 5 | 10 |
| 1991–92 | Nashville Knights | ECHL | 17 | 4 | 7 | 11 | 8 | — | — | — | — | — |
| 1991–92 | Raleigh Icecaps | ECHL | 27 | 13 | 13 | 26 | 34 | — | — | — | — | — |
| 1991–92 | Greensboro Monarchs | ECHL | 7 | 6 | 6 | 12 | 0 | 11 | 6 | 8 | 14 | 8 |
| NCAA totals | | | 145 | 98 | 60 | 157 | 181 | — | — | — | — | — |
| ECHL totals | | | 113 | 70 | 63 | 133 | 156 | 19 | 8 | 11 | 19 | 18 |

== Awards and honors ==
| Award | Year |
|---|---|
| All-Hockey East Second Team | 1985–86 |
| All-Hockey East Second Team | 1986–87 |
| AHCA East Second-Team All-American | 1987–88 |
