= Tom Eccleston =

American ice hockey, football and baseball coach

Biographical details
- Born: May 22, 1910
- Died: December 23, 2000 (aged 90)

Coaching career (HC unless noted)
- 1956–1964: Providence

Head coaching record
- Overall: 94–72–5

Accomplishments and honors

Championships
- 1964 ECAC Hockey regular season 1964 ECAC Hockey Tournament

Awards
- 1964 Spencer Penrose Award; 1988 Rhode Island Heritage Hall of Fame; Providence Athletic Hall of Fame 2019 RI Hockey Hall of Fame

Thomas E. Eccleston Jr. (May 22, 1910 – December 23, 2000) was an American ice hockey, football and baseball coach. Eccleston spent most of his career at Burrillville High School in some capacity but was also the head coach for Providence for eight seasons.

== Career ==
Tom Eccleston graduated from Brown University in 1932, playing four years of soccer, and immediately moved into a teaching position at Burrillville High in Burrillville, Rhode Island. Initially a history teacher and football coach, Eccleston eventually added the coaching duties of baseball and ice hockey to his responsibilities, winning state championships in all three sports. For 23 years Eccleston declined all offers to coach at the collegiate level but finally accepted an offer from Providence in 1956 to alleviate issues that had arisen while coaching his sons.

Eccleston became the fifth head coach at Providence (the second since the program restarted after World War II) and immediately provided the school with its best record in 1956-57 at 11–7. Eccleston continued to keep the Friars in a strong position for the duration of his tenure, including its transition into ECAC Hockey in the early 1960s, recruiting players like Lou Lamoriello, Bob Bellemore and Larry Kish. In eight seasons behind the bench Eccleston had only one losing season and in 1963-64 gave Providence its first conference title and NCAA tournament appearance. The '64 season was the best in Providence's history to that point and very few have topped it. For the outstanding year Eccleston received the Spencer Penrose Award and then stepped down from his position to devote more attention to being the school superintendent in Burrillville.

In 1987, after 32 years away, Eccleston returned to Burrillville High to coach the ice hockey team when it was in jeopardy and revived the program. He was enshrined in the Rhode Island Hockey Hall of Fame in 2019.

== Head coaching record ==
Record table
Season	Team	Overall	Conference	Standing	Postseason
Providence Friars Independent (1956–1961)
1956-57	Providence	11-7-0			
1957-58	Providence	11-11-0			
1958-59	Providence	7-13-1			
1959-60	Providence	11-9-0			
1960-61	Providence	11-9-0			
Providence:		51-49-1			
Providence Friars (ECAC Hockey) (1961–1964)
1961-62	Providence	11-8-2	8-7-2	14th	ECAC Quarterfinals
1962-63	Providence	13-8-2	13-4-2	5th	ECAC Quarterfinals
1963-64	Providence	19-7-0	16-3-0	1st	NCAA Consolation (Loss)
Providence:		43-23-4	37-14-4		
Total:		94-72-5			
National champion Postseason invitational champion Conference regular season champion Conference regular season and conference tournament champion Division regular season champion Division regular season and conference tournament champion Conference tournament champion

Awards and achievements
Preceded by Tony Frasca	Spencer Penrose Award; 1963–64	Succeeded by James Fullerton
