= Scot Kleinendorst =

American ice hockey player (1960–2019)

- Born: January 16, 1960 Grand Rapids, Minnesota, U.S.
- Died: December 17, 2019 (aged 59) Duluth, Minnesota, U.S.
- Height: 6 ft 3 in (191 cm)
- Weight: 205 lb (93 kg; 14 st 9 lb)
- Position: Defense
- Shot: Left
- Played for: New York Rangers; Hartford Whalers; Washington Capitals
- National team: United States
- NHL draft: 98th overall, 1980; New York Rangers
- Playing career: 1981–1990

Scot Brian Kleinendorst (January 16, 1960 – December 17, 2019) was an American ice hockey defenseman.

Drafted in 1980 by the New York Rangers, Kleinendorst also played in the National Hockey League (NHL) for the Hartford Whalers and Washington Capitals. He was the brother of Kurt Kleinendorst.

Kleinendorst died on December 17, 2019, after being injured in a workplace accident at a paper mill on December 9. He suffered severe head trauma and multiple fractures after being ejected from a piece of heavy machinery he was operating, and died at a hospital in Duluth.

== Career statistics ==
=== Regular season and playoffs ===
| | | | Regular season | | | | | Playoffs |
| Season | Team | League | GP | G | A | Pts | PIM | GP | G | A | Pts | PIM |
|---|---|---|---|---|---|---|---|---|---|---|---|---|
| 1978–79 | Providence College | ECAC | 25 | 4 | 4 | 8 | 27 | — | — | — | — | — |
| 1979–80 | Providence College | ECAC | 30 | 1 | 12 | 13 | 38 | — | — | — | — | — |
| 1980–81 | Providence College | ECAC | 32 | 3 | 31 | 34 | 75 | — | — | — | — | — |
| 1981–82 | Providence College | ECAC | 33 | 11 | 27 | 38 | 85 | — | — | — | — | — |
| 1981–82 | Springfield Indians | AHL | 5 | 0 | 4 | 4 | 11 | — | — | — | — | — |
| 1982–83 | New York Rangers | NHL | 30 | 2 | 9 | 11 | 8 | 6 | 0 | 2 | 2 | 2 |
| 1982–83 | Tulsa Oilers | CHL | 10 | 0 | 7 | 7 | 14 | — | — | — | — | — |
| 1983–84 | New York Rangers | NHL | 23 | 0 | 2 | 2 | 35 | — | — | — | — | — |
| 1983–84 | Tulsa Oilers | CHL | 10 | 4 | 5 | 9 | 4 | — | — | — | — | — |
| 1984–85 | Binghamton Whalers | AHL | 30 | 3 | 7 | 10 | 42 | — | — | — | — | — |
| 1984–85 | Hartford Whalers | NHL | 35 | 1 | 8 | 9 | 69 | — | — | — | — | — |
| 1985–86 | Hartford Whalers | NHL | 41 | 2 | 7 | 9 | 62 | 10 | 0 | 1 | 1 | 18 |
| 1986–87 | Hartford Whalers | NHL | 66 | 3 | 9 | 12 | 130 | 4 | 1 | 3 | 4 | 20 |
| 1987–88 | Hartford Whalers | NHL | 44 | 3 | 6 | 9 | 86 | 3 | 1 | 1 | 2 | 0 |
| 1988–89 | Binghamton Whalers | AHL | 4 | 0 | 1 | 1 | 19 | — | — | — | — | — |
| 1988–89 | Hartford Whalers | NHL | 24 | 0 | 1 | 1 | 36 | — | — | — | — | — |
| 1988–89 | Washington Capitals | NHL | 3 | 0 | 1 | 1 | 10 | — | — | — | — | — |
| 1989–90 | Baltimore Skipjacks | AHL | 2 | 2 | 0 | 2 | 6 | — | — | — | — | — |
| 1989–90 | Washington Capitals | NHL | 15 | 1 | 3 | 4 | 16 | 3 | 0 | 0 | 0 | 0 |
| NHL totals | | | 281 | 12 | 46 | 58 | 452 | 26 | 2 | 7 | 9 | 40 |

== Awards and honors ==
| Award | Year |
|---|---|
| All-ECAC Hockey Second Team | 1979–80 |
| All-ECAC Hockey First Team | 1981–82 |
