= Paul Guay =

American ice hockey player (born 1963)

- Born: September 2, 1963 (age 63) Providence, Rhode Island, U.S.
- Height: 6 ft 0 in (183 cm)
- Weight: 185 lb (84 kg; 13 st 3 lb)
- Position: Right Wing
- Shot: Right
- Played for: Philadelphia Flyers; Los Angeles Kings; Boston Bruins; New York Islanders
- National team: United States
- NHL draft: 118th overall, 1981; Minnesota North Stars
- Playing career: 1984–1993

Paul Francois Guay (born September 2, 1963) is an American former professional ice hockey player. He is now an assistant coach for his high school's hockey team and is a Battalion Chief for the Pawtucket Fire Department. He was inducted into the Rhode Island Hockey Hall of Fame in 2020.

== Amateur career ==
Guay played high school hockey at Mount Saint Charles Academy, which has been known to boost many players up to the NHL.

While at Providence College, Guay set the school's record for number of goals in a single-season by scoring 34 in 1982–1983.

Paul played for the 1984 US Olympic team and scored one goal with the team.

== Professional career ==
Guay was drafted by the Minnesota North Stars in the 1981 NHL Entry Draft. He made his NHL debut with the Philadelphia Flyers in the 1983–1984 season. Paul would go on to play 117 games in the NHL for the Flyers, Los Angeles Kings, Boston Bruins, and New York Islanders.

== Career statistics ==
=== Regular season and playoffs ===
			Regular season					Playoffs
Season	Team	League	GP	G	A	Pts	PIM	GP	G	A	Pts	PIM
1979–80	Mount Saint Charles Academy	HSRI	23	18	19	37	43	—	—	—	—	—
1980–81	Mount Saint Charles Academy	HSRI	23	28	38	66	32	—	—	—	—	—
1981–82	Providence College	ECAC	33	23	17	40	38	—	—	—	—	—
1982–83	Providence College	ECAC	42	34	31	65	83	—	—	—	—	—
1983–84	United States	Intl	62	20	18	38	44	—	—	—	—	—
1983–84	Philadelphia Flyers	NHL	14	2	6	8	14	3	0	0	0	4
1984–85	Philadelphia Flyers	NHL	2	0	1	1	0	—	—	—	—	—
1984–85	Hershey Bears	AHL	74	23	30	53	123	—	—	—	—	—
1985–86	Los Angeles Kings	NHL	23	3	3	6	18	—	—	—	—	—
1985–86	New Haven Nighthawks	AHL	57	15	36	51	101	5	3	0	3	11
1986–87	Los Angeles Kings	NHL	35	2	5	7	16	2	0	0	0	0
1986–87	New Haven Nighthawks	AHL	6	1	3	4	11	—	—	—	—	—
1987–88	Los Angeles Kings	NHL	33	4	4	8	40	4	0	1	1	8
1987–88	New Haven Nighthawks	AHL	42	21	26	47	53	—	—	—	—	—
1988–89	Los Angeles Kings	NHL	2	0	0	0	2	—	—	—	—	—
1988–89	New Haven Nighthawks	AHL	4	4	6	10	20	—	—	—	—	—
1988–89	Boston Bruins	NHL	5	0	2	2	0	—	—	—	—	—
1988–89	Maine Mariners	AHL	61	15	29	44	77	—	—	—	—	—
1989–90	Utica Devils	AHL	75	25	30	55	103	5	2	2	4	13
1990–91	New York Islanders	NHL	3	0	2	2	2	—	—	—	—	—
1990–91	Capital District Islanders	AHL	74	26	35	61	81	—	—	—	—	—
1991–92	Milwaukee Admirals	IHL	81	24	33	57	93	3	2	1	3	7
1992–93	Springfield Indians	AHL	65	10	32	42	90	11	1	2	3	6
NHL totals			117	11	23	34	92	9	0	1	1	12
AHL totals			458	140	227	367	659	21	6	4	10	30
IHL totals			81	24	33	57	93	3	2	1	3	7

=== International ===
Year	Team	Event	GP	G	A	Pts	PIM
1984	United States	OG	6	1	0	1	8
Senior totals			6	1	0	1	8

== Awards and honors ==
Award	Year
All-ECAC Hockey Second Team	1982–83
