= Rob Gaudreau =

American ice hockey player (born 1970)

- Born: January 20, 1970 (age 56) Cranston, Rhode Island, U.S.
- Height: 5 ft 11 in (180 cm)
- Weight: 185 lb (84 kg; 13 st 3 lb)
- Position: Right wing
- Shot: Right
- Played for: San Jose Sharks; Ottawa Senators
- National team: United States
- NHL draft: 172nd overall, 1988; Pittsburgh Penguins
- Playing career: 1992–1997

Robert Rene Gaudreau (born January 20, 1970) is an American former professional ice hockey player. He played in the National Hockey League from 1992 to 1996 with the San Jose Sharks and Ottawa Senators. Internationally Gaudreau played for the American national team at the senior and junior level, including the 1993 World Championship. He is the son of former Brown University ice hockey All-American and 1968 USA Olympian, Robert Gaudreau.

== Playing career ==
Gaudreau was drafted 172nd overall by the Pittsburgh Penguins in the 1988 NHL entry draft and started his National Hockey League career with the San Jose Sharks in 1992. He would go on to play for the Ottawa Senators after being claimed in the January 1995 waiver draft. He played a total of 231 regular season games, scoring 51 goals and 54 assists for 105 points and collecting 69 penalty minutes. Gaudreau recorded the first two hat tricks in San Jose Sharks history during the 1992–93 season. He was also the first Sharks player to be named the NHL's Rookie of the Month. He also played 14 playoff games with the San Jose Sharks during the 1994 season, scoring two goals. He left the NHL after the 1996 season and played just one more season in Switzerland's Nationalliga A for HC La Chaux-de-Fonds before retiring.

== Career statistics ==
=== Regular season and playoffs ===
			Regular season					Playoffs
Season	Team	League	GP	G	A	Pts	PIM	GP	G	A	Pts	PIM
1986–87	Bishop Hendricken High School	HSRI	33	41	39	80	—	—	—	—	—	—
1987–88	Bishop Hendricken High School	HSRI	32	52	60	112	—	—	—	—	—	—
1988–89	Providence College	HE	42	28	29	57	32	—	—	—	—	—
1989–90	Providence College	HE	32	20	18	38	12	—	—	—	—	—
1990–91	Providence College	HE	36	34	27	61	20	—	—	—	—	—
1991–92	Providence College	HE	36	21	34	55	22	—	—	—	—	—
1992–93	Kansas City Blades	IHL	19	8	6	14	6	—	—	—	—	—
1992–93	San Jose Sharks	NHL	59	23	20	43	18	—	—	—	—	—
1993–94	San Jose Sharks	NHL	84	15	20	35	28	14	2	0	2	0
1994–95	Ottawa Senators	NHL	36	5	9	14	8	—	—	—	—	—
1995–96	PEI Senators	AHL	3	2	0	2	4	—	—	—	—	—
1995–96	Ottawa Senators	NHL	52	8	5	13	15	—	—	—	—	—
1996–97	HC La Chaux–de–Fonds	NDA	37	19	23	42	62	—	—	—	—	—
NHL totals			231	51	54	105	69	13	2	0	2	0

=== International ===
Year	Team	Event	GP	G	A	Pts	PIM
1990	United States	WJC	7	3	1	4	6
1993	United States	WC	5	3	3	6	2
Junior totals			7	3	1	4	6
Senior totals			5	3	3	6	2

== Awards and honors ==
Award	Year
All-Hockey East Rookie Team	1988–89
All-Hockey East Second team	1990–91
All-Hockey East First Team	1991–92
AHCA East Second-Team All-American	1991–92
Hockey East All-Tournament Team	1992
Inducted into the RI Hockey Hall of Fame	2022

Awards and achievements
Preceded by Mario Thyer	Hockey East Rookie of the Year; 1988–89 With Scott Pellerin	Succeeded by Scott Cashman
