= Gaetano Orlando =

Italian-Canadian ice hockey player and coach

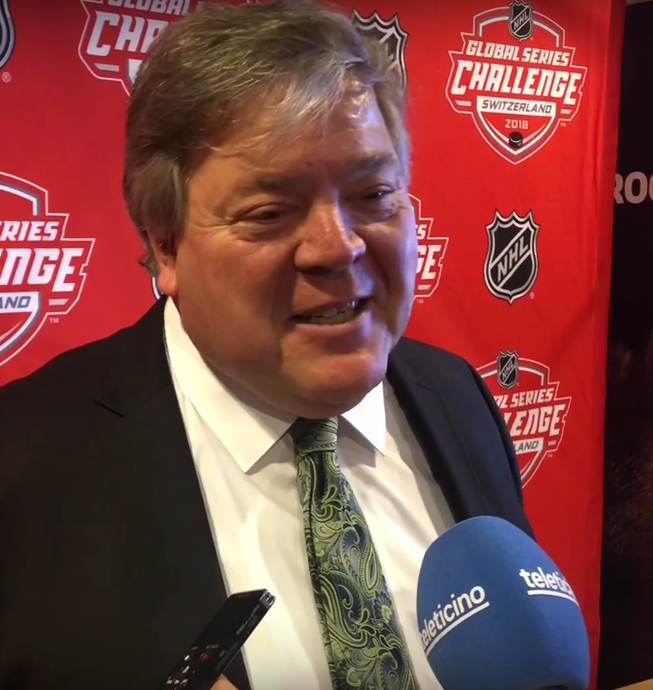
- Orlando in 2018
- Born: November 13, 1962 (age 63) LaSalle, Quebec, Canada
- Height: 5 ft 8 in (173 cm)
- Weight: 175 lb (79 kg; 12 st 7 lb)
- Position: Centre
- Shot: Right
- Played for: Buffalo Sabres
- National team: Italy
- NHL draft: 164th overall, 1981; Buffalo Sabres
- Playing career: 1980–1999

Gaetano "Gates" Orlando (born November 13, 1962) is a Canadian-born Italian former ice hockey centre. He played in the National Hockey League (NHL) with the Buffalo Sabres between 1984 and 1987. The rest of his career, which lasted from 1984 to 1999, was mainly spent in the Italian Serie A and Swiss Nationalliga A. Internationally Orlando played for the Italian national team at several World Championships and at the 1994 and 1998 Winter Olympics. He later coached in the minor leagues for a few years, and also worked as a scout for the New Jersey Devils of the NHL. His father's ancestry hails from Agnone, Isernia, Molise, Italy.

== International play ==
By virtue of his Italian ancestry and playing in Italy, Orlando acquired Italian citizenship and was eligible for the Italian national ice hockey team.

He participated in the following tournaments:

- 8 A-World Championships: 1992, 1993, 1994, 1995, 1996, 1997, 1998, 1999
- 2 B-World Championships: 1990, 1991
- 2 Olympic Games: 1994 in Lillehammer and 1998 in Nagano

Orlando wore jersey number 17 in the national team.

== Artificial heart and Heart Transplant ==
A sarcoidosis patient, in March 2011, Orlando was diagnosed with congestive heart failure. He was participating in a clinical study of Life Vest, a wearable defibrillator. On May 22, the defibrillator saved his life after his heart stopped for 40 seconds. Orlando was the first participant in the study to have required the vest to deliver a shock.

On April 4, 2012, Orlando received an artificial heart to extend his life while he waits for a donated biological heart. The operation, performed at the University of Rochester Medical Center, was the first such operation in Upstate New York.

A donor heart became available February 4, 2013 so the transplant teams were mobilized for surgery that day at the University of Rochester Medical Center. He was able to return home 25 days later.

== Career statistics ==
=== Regular season and playoffs ===
			Regular season					Playoffs
Season	Team	League	GP	G	A	Pts	PIM	GP	G	A	Pts	PIM
1979–80	Montréal Juniors	QMJHL	70	28	44	72	50	9	6	5	11	8
1980–81	Providence College	ECAC	31	24	32	56	45	—	—	—	—	—
1981–82	Providence College	ECAC	28	18	18	36	31	—	—	—	—	—
1982–83	Providence College	ECAC	40	30	39	69	32	—	—	—	—	—
1983–84	Providence College	ECAC	34	23	30	53	52	—	—	—	—	—
1983–84	Rochester Americans	AHL	11	8	7	15	2	18	4	10	14	6
1984–85	Buffalo Sabres	NHL	11	3	6	9	6	5	0	4	4	14
1984–85	Rochester Americans	AHL	49	26	30	56	62	2	0	1	1	6
1985–86	Buffalo Sabres	NHL	60	13	12	25	29	—	—	—	—	—
1985–86	Rochester Americans	AHL	3	4	0	4	10	—	—	—	—	—
1986–87	Buffalo Sabres	NHL	27	2	8	10	16	—	—	—	—	—
1986–87	Rochester Americans	AHL	44	22	42	64	42	18	9	13	22	14
1987–88	HC Merano	ITA	36	49	44	93	66	10	10	7	17	23
1987–88	Rochester Americans	AHL	13	4	13	17	18	7	2	6	8	6
1988–89	HC Bolzano	ITA	34	40	39	79	66	10	17	6	23	0
1989–90	HC Bolzano	ITA	36	64	62	126	18	6	8	10	18	6
1990–91	HC Bolzano	ITA	27	39	33	72	29	10	8	15	23	12
1991–92	HC Devils Milano	ITA	18	21	22	43	12	11	11	17	28	42
1991–92	HC Devils Milano	ALP	11	8	7	15	2	—	—	—	—	—
1992–93	HC Devils Milano	ITA	16	9	18	27	14	11	5	9	14	23
1992–93	HC Devils Milano	ALP	25	19	27	46	46	—	—	—	—	—
1993–94	HC Devils Milano	ITA	20	16	44	60	10	8	8	10	18	27
1993–94	HC Devils Milano	AL	30	16	31	47	29	—	—	—	—	—
1994–95	SC Bern	NDA	36	24	31	55	58	6	3	7	10	8
1995–96	SC Bern	NDA	34	15	26	41	62	11	10	8	18	45
1996–97	SC Bern	NDA	46	26	56	82	34	13	7	10	17	12
1997–98	SC Bern	NDA	38	16	32	48	73	7	6	3	9	18
1997–98	SC Langnau	SWI-2	—	—	—	—	—	4	1	4	5	8
1997–98	SG Cortina	ITA	—	—	—	—	—	2	3	0	3	4
1998–99	HC Lugano	NDA	27	12	20	32	34	11	6	5	11	10
2003–04	Albany River Rats	AHL	1	0	0	0	0	—	—	—	—	—
ITA totals			187	238	262	500	215	68	70	74	144	137
NHL totals			98	18	26	44	51	5	0	4	4	14

=== International ===
Year	Team	Event	GP	G	A	Pts	PIM
1990	Italy	WC B	7	9	4	13	6
1991	Italy	WC B	7	8	4	12	2
1992	Italy	WC	5	0	3	3	4
1993	Italy	WC	6	1	0	1	2
1994	Italy	OLY	7	3	6	9	4
1994	Italy	WC	6	3	4	7	6
1995	Italy	WC	6	1	2	3	12
1996	Italy	WC	6	2	5	7	6
1997	Italy	WC	8	5	4	9	14
1998	Italy	OLY	4	1	2	3	4
1998	Italy	WC	6	3	2	5	2
1999	Italy	WC	3	0	1	1	4
Senior totals			71	36	37	73	66

== Coaching career ==
After retiring from pro ice hockey by the end of 1998–99 with HC Lugano, Orlando become a coach. At the World Championships he served as an assistant coach with the Italian national team while still being a player.

Season	Team	League	Type
1999 – 00	Rochester Junior A Americans	NAHL	Head Coach
2000 – 01	Adirondack IceHawks	UHL	Head Coach
2001 – 02	Adirondack IceHawks	UHL	Head Coach
2002 – 03	Albany River Rats	AHL	Assistant Coach
2003 – 04	Albany River Rats	AHL	Assistant Coach

== Awards and honors ==
Award	Year
All-ECAC Hockey First Team	1983–84
AHCA East Second-Team All-American	1983–84

- 1990 - Serie A Champion with HC Bolzano
- 1992 - Serie A Champion with Milano Devils
- 1993 - Serie A Champion with Milano Devils
- 1994 - Serie A Champion with AC Milan Hockey
- 1997 - NLA Champion with SC Bern
- 1999 - NLA Champion with HC Lugano
