= Chad Quenneville =

American ice hockey player (born 1972)

- Born: May 13, 1972 (age 54) South Hadley, Massachusetts, USA
- Height: 5 ft 9 in (175 cm)
- Weight: 174 lb (79 kg; 12 st 6 lb)
- Position: Center
- Shot: Left
- Played for: Providence; Albany River Rats; Atlanta Knights; Nashville Knights; Pensacola Ice Pilots
- Playing career: 1991–1999

Chad Quenneville is an American retired ice hockey center who was a two-time All-American for Providence.

== Career ==
Quenneville began attending Providence College in the fall of 1991 and immediately began producing for the Friars. He was nearly a point per game player in each of his first two seasons and then led Providence in scoring as a junior. He increased his production as a senior, again leading the Friars in scoring, and was named an All-American in each of his final two years with the program. While Quenneville was productive offensively, he couldn't help Providence win many games on the ice. The Friars' record declined for three years and held flat in his final year. He was, however, able to lead Providence to a surprising run to the Hockey East championship game.

After finishing up his college career, Quenneville began playing professionally with a small stint for two teams at the AAA level. He soon found a home in the ECHL, becoming a high-scoring forward for the Pensacola Ice Pilots. Quenneville led the team to the semifinals in 1997 and the Kelly Cup finals the following year. After leading Pensacola in scoring for the second time in 1999, Quenneville retired from the game.

He was inducted in the Providence Athletic Hall of Fame in 2016.

== Statistics ==
=== Regular season and playoffs ===
			Regular Season					Playoffs
Season	Team	League	GP	G	A	Pts	PIM	GP	G	A	Pts	PIM
1991–92	Providence	Hockey East	36	13	22	35	18	—	—	—	—	—
1992–93	Providence	Hockey East	38	18	20	38	22	—	—	—	—	—
1993–94	Providence	Hockey East	35	22	18	40	24	—	—	—	—	—
1994–95	Providence	Hockey East	36	25	29	54	51	—	—	—	—	—
1994–95	Albany River Rats	AHL	8	1	5	6	0	—	—	—	—	—
1995–96	Atlanta Knights	IHL	6	1	1	2	2	—	—	—	—	—
1995–96	Nashville Knights	ECHL	54	16	25	41	24	4	1	2	3	6
1996–97	Pensacola Ice Pilots	ECHL	70	43	52	95	67	12	6	8	14	10
1997–98	Pensacola Ice Pilots	ECHL	70	26	44	70	38	19	4	6	10	4
1998–99	Pensacola Ice Pilots	ECHL	70	24	38	62	22	—	—	—	—	—
NCAA totals			145	78	89	167	115	—	—	—	—	—
ECHL totals			264	109	159	268	151	35	11	16	27	20

== Awards and honors ==
Award	Year
AHCA East Second-Team All-American	1993–94
Hockey East All-Star	1994–95
AHCA East Second-Team All-American	1994–95
Hockey East All-Tournament Team	1995
