= Raleigh IceCaps =

Former professional minor league ice hockey team in Raleigh, North Carolina

- City: Raleigh, North Carolina
- League: ECHL
- Founded: 1991
- Operated: 1991–1998
- Home arena: Dorton Arena

Franchise history
- 1991–1998: Raleigh IceCaps
- 1998–2008: Augusta Lynx

Championships
- Regular season titles: none
- Division titles: none
- Conference titles: none
- Kelly Cups: none

The Raleigh IceCaps were a professional minor league ice hockey team based in Raleigh, North Carolina. They joined the East Coast Hockey League in 1991, bringing a pro hockey team to the state's capital for the first time. Over seven seasons, the IceCaps cultivated a dedicated regional following and served as a development stop on the path to higher leagues. In 1998, the franchise moved to Augusta, Georgia and was reborn as the Augusta Lynx after the National Hockey League arrived in the region. Although the team never captured a division title or league championship, its tenure laid the groundwork for hockey in Raleigh.

== History ==
=== Founding and early years (1991 to 1994) ===
Organized as Raleigh Hockey Inc. under the leadership of Miles Wolff and Pete Bock. They adopted colours of blue, silver, black, and white. Wolff, known for his success in minor‑league baseball, and Bock, former general manager of the Durham Bulls, brought complementary expertise in sports promotion and operations to the new hockey venture.

=== 1991–92 season ===
Raleigh started play in the 1991–92 season, under head coach Kurt Kleinendorst, the roster featured twenty‑four Canadian players, twenty‑three Americans and one Slovakian recruit. The club finished with a 25–33–6 record, scoring 228 goals in 64 games (3.56 per game) and drawing an average of 4,773 fans per home contest. The IceCaps reached the Kelly Cup playoffs in their inaugural season, losing to the Hampton Roads Admirals in the first round, and the inaugural campaign established hockey’s viability in Raleigh.

=== 1992–93 season ===
In their second year the IceCaps improved to a 37–22–5 record, earning 79 points and a third‑place finish in the East Division. Raleigh qualified for its first Kelly Cup playoffs, advancing to the semifinals before elimination. Fan engagement grew alongside on‑ice success, with average attendance rising above 5,000.

=== 1993–94 season ===
The 1993–94 campaign saw the franchise achieve its best regular‑season performance, posting a 41–20–7 record for 89 points and a second‑place divisional finish. The IceCaps returned to the Kelly Cup playoffs and advanced to the league finals, where they were defeated in four games. Home‑game attendance remained strong, averaging nearly 4,954 fans per contest.

=== 1994–95 season ===
Under head coach Rick Barkovich the IceCaps struggled to a 23–39–6 record and failed to qualify for the Kelly Cup playoffs. Home‑game attendance nevertheless peaked at an average of 5 021 spectators per contest, driven by popular promotional nights and a growing fan base in Raleigh. In March 1995 the Greensboro Monarchs ownership group, led by John Gagnon, acquired controlling interest in the franchise, signaling new investment and a shift in the club’s regional ambitions.

=== 1995–96 season ===
Raleigh rebounded to qualify for the Kelly Cup playoffs, though the club was eliminated in the first round. Attendance declined to 4 004 fans per home game, reflecting the challenges of minor‑league roster turnover and regional competition for entertainment dollars.

=== 1996–97 season ===
The IceCaps missed the playoffs for a second consecutive year, and average attendance fell further to 3 091 per game. In November 1996 Clay Aiken of the Raleigh Boychoir performed the national anthem before select home dates, highlighting the team’s role as a community and cultural gathering point.

=== 1997-98 season ===
The IceCaps completed their seventh and final campaign with a record of 27-33-8 ties and did not qualify for the playoffs. Home game attendance fell to an average of 1 913 spectators per contest, reflecting fan awareness of the announced relocation to Augusta, Georgia rather than diminished interest in hockey. Competition from the NHL's Carolina Hurricanes and scheduling conflicts at Dorton Arena added to the club’s operational challenges. The franchise transferred to Augusta Georgia for the 1998 to 1999 season and was rebranded the Augusta Lynx.

== Home arena ==
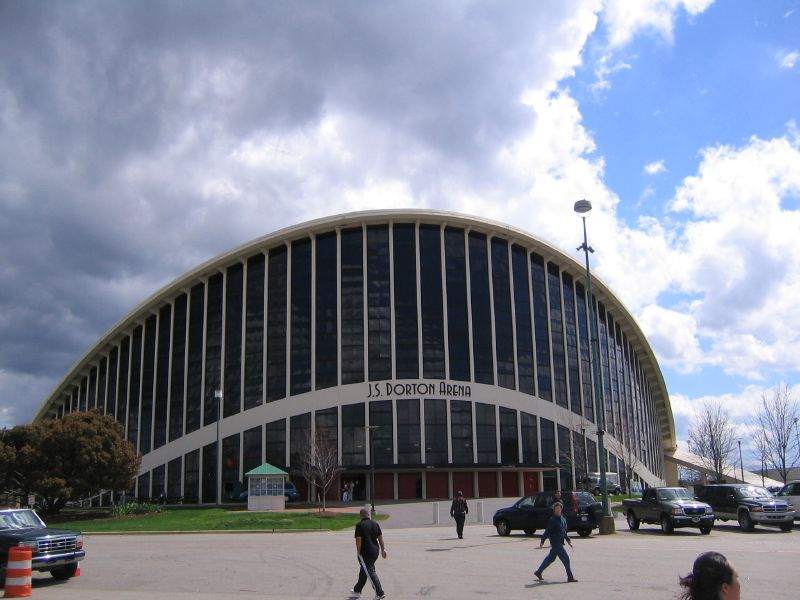
Dorton Arena

The IceCaps played at J. S. Dorton Arena, a state‑owned multipurpose venue on the North Carolina State Fairgrounds in Raleigh. Completed in 1952, Dorton provides 5,000 permanent seats and can be expanded to about 7,500 with portable seating for hockey games. The elliptic structure features 25,000 sq ft of floor space, dressing rooms, concessions and storage areas but lacks permanent air conditioning, relying on mechanical heating and portable fans for climate control.

Dorton Arena’s distinctive glass‑walled design created unique challenges for hosting IceCaps games. Sun glare off the curved facade sometimes forced delays to scheduled puck drops. Without permanent air conditioning, heat and humidity accumulated inside the venue, producing fog and puddles on the ice that required extra resurfacing breaks.

== Head coaches ==
- Kurt Kleinendorst (1991–92 to 1993–94; 1995–96 to 1996–97)
- Rick Barkovich (1994–95)
- Dan Wiebe (1997–98)

== NHL and AHL affiliations ==
The Raleigh IceCaps maintained formal developmental partnerships with several higher‑level clubs throughout their existence:

- Albany River Rats (AHL) – primary affiliate from 1995 to 1998
- Baltimore Bandits (AHL) – primary affiliate in 1995–96
- Los Angeles Kings (NHL) – secondary affiliate in 1991–92
- Toronto Maple Leafs (NHL) – secondary affiliate in 1992–93
- Hartford Whalers (NHL) – secondary affiliate in 1993–94
- New Jersey Devils (NHL) – secondary affiliate from 1993 to 1998
- Anaheim Ducks (NHL) – secondary affiliate in 1995–96
- Ottawa Senators (NHL) – secondary affiliate in 1996–97

== Legacy and tributes ==
In 2023, the Carolina Hurricanes honoured the IceCaps’ place in Raleigh's hockey history by wearing IceCaps warmup jerseys before their home game at PNC Arena. The event formed part of the team’s “North Carolina Night” promotion and featured appearances by former IceCaps players, reinforcing the franchise’s legacy in the Triangle region.
