= Tim Army =

American ice hockey player

- Born: April 26, 1963 (age 63) Providence, Rhode Island, U.S.
- Height: 6 ft 0 in (183 cm)
- Weight: 173 lb (78 kg; 12 st 5 lb)
- Position: Forward
- Shot: Right
- Played for: Maine Mariners
- NHL draft: 171st overall, 1981; Colorado Rockies
- Playing career: 1985–1987
- Coaching career

Biographical details
- Education: Providence College

Playing career
- 1981–1985: Providence
- 1985–1986: Maine Mariners
- 1986–1987: Peliitat Heinola
- 1986–1987: HC Fribourg-Gottéron
- Position: Right Wing

Coaching career (HC unless noted)
- 1987–1993: Providence (Assistant)
- 1991: Team USA (Assistant)
- 1993: Team USA (Assistant)
- 1993–1997: Mighty Ducks of Anaheim (Assistant)
- 1994: Team USA (Assistant)
- 1995–1996: Team USA
- 1996: Team USA (Assistant)
- 1997–2002: Washington Capitals (Assistant)
- 2002–2005: Portland Pirates
- 2004: Team USA (Assistant)
- 2005: Team USA
- 2005–2011: Providence
- 2011–2017: Colorado Avalanche (Assistant)
- 2013: Team USA (Assistant)
- 2017–2018: Wilkes-Barre/Scranton Penguins (Assistant)
- 2018–2023: Iowa Wild
- 2024–present: Anaheim Ducks (Assistant)

Head coaching record
- Overall: 66–116–28 (.381) [college]

Tim Army (born April 26, 1963) is an American former professional ice hockey player. He currently serves as an assistant coach for the Anaheim Ducks of the National Hockey League (NHL). Army was selected by the Colorado Rockies in the 9th round (171st overall) of the 1981 NHL entry draft.

Army played four seasons at Providence College with the Providence Friars, where during the 1984–85 season he was rewarded for his outstanding play when he was named to the NCAA (East) First All-American Team and was selected as a finalist for the Hobey Baker Award.

He was inducted into the Rhode Island Hockey Hall of Fame in 2020.

== Coaching career ==
Army played just two professional seasons before retiring due to injury. He returned to the Friars in serving as an assistant coach from 1988 to 1993, before accepting an NHL assistant coaching role with the Mighty Ducks of Anaheim from 1993 to 1997. After five seasons with the Washington Capitals as an assistant, Army secured his first head coach role with the Portland Pirates of the American Hockey League (AHL) in 2002.

In 2005, Army left the Pirates to take up the head coaching role with Providence College. Army directed the Friars program for six seasons before he returned to the NHL with the Colorado Avalanche as a video coach for the 2011–12 season. He was elevated to an assistant coach for the following season under Joe Sacco. He continued in an assistant coach role over the next five seasons under Sacco, Patrick Roy and Jared Bednar before his release from the club following the 2016–17 season.

Army then became an assistant coach for the Wilkes-Barre/Scranton Penguins, the AHL affiliate of the Pittsburgh Penguins in the 2017–18 season. After one season, he was hired as the head coach of the Iowa Wild, the AHL affiliate of the Minnesota Wild, for the 2018–19 season.

Army has served as an assistant coach for the United States men's national ice hockey team at the 1994 and 1996 Men's World Ice Hockey Championships, and at the 2004 World Cup of Hockey, and also the 2012 World Cup of Hockey

Army was hired by the Anaheim Ducks for the 2024-25 NHL season, his second stint with the team. He was hired to coach for Greg Cronin and was retained on Joel Quenneville's staff when he took over head coaching duties.

== Head coaching record ==
=== College ===
Record table
Season	Team	Overall	Conference	Standing	Postseason
Providence Friars (Hockey East) (2005–2011)
2005–06	Providence	17–16–3	14–10–3	5th	Hockey East Quarterfinals
2006–07	Providence	10–23–3	9–15–3	8th	Hockey East Quarterfinals
2007–08	Providence	14–17–5	11–11–5	5th	Hockey East Quarterfinals
2008–09	Providence	7–22–5	4–18–5	t-9th	
2009–10	Providence	10–20–4	5–18–4	10th	
2010–11	Providence	8–18–8	4–16–7	9th	
Providence:		66–116–28	47–88–27		
Total:		66–116–28			
National champion Postseason invitational champion Conference regular season champion Conference regular season and conference tournament champion Division regular season champion Division regular season and conference tournament champion Conference tournament champion

== Awards and honors ==
Award	Year
All-Hockey East First Team	1984–85
AHCA West First-Team All-American	1984–85
Hobey Baker Award Finalist	1984–85

Awards and achievements
Preceded by Award created	Hockey East Scoring Champion; 1984–85	Succeeded by Scott Harlow
