= Nolan Schaefer =

Canadian ice hockey player

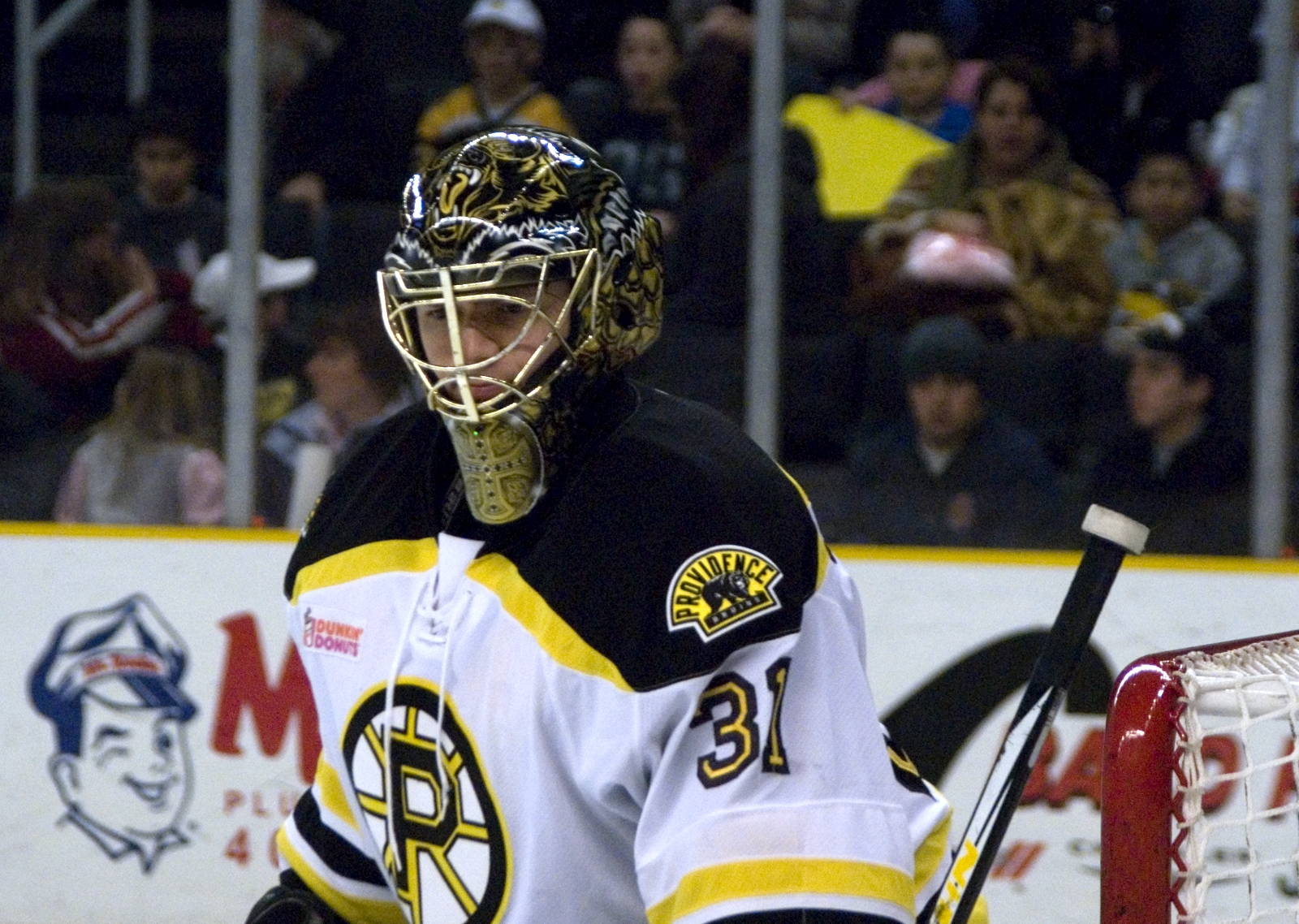
- Schaefer with the Providence Bruins in 2011
- Born: January 15, 1980 (age 46) Yellow Grass, Saskatchewan, Canada
- Height: 6 ft 2 in (188 cm)
- Weight: 195 lb (88 kg; 13 st 13 lb)
- Position: Goaltender
- Caught: Right
- Played for: San Jose Sharks; CSKA Moscow; HC Ambrì-Piotta; SC Bern
- NHL draft: 166th overall, 2000; San Jose Sharks
- Playing career: 2003–2015

Nolan Schaefer (born January 15, 1980) is a Canadian former ice hockey goaltender. He last played for HC Ambrì-Piotta of the Swiss National League A (NLA) in 2015.

== Playing career ==
Schaefer began a four-year tenure with Providence College, beginning in 1999–00. He played in 99 games total with Providence and recorded a school record 2,848 saves. He enjoyed his most successful season as a Friar in 2000–01 when he posted 15 wins, leading PC to the NCAA Tournament and was named to the All-American Second Team.

Following his freshman year with Providence, Schaefer was selected by the San Jose Sharks in fifth round (166th overall) of the 2000 NHL entry draft on June 24, 2000. He followed in his brother Peter Schaefer's footsteps and became the second person from Yellow Grass to be drafted and play in the National Hockey League (NHL).

Schaefer signed a contract with San Jose on August 19, 2003, and spent three seasons playing with the Sharks' AHL affiliate Cleveland Barons (The Barons moved to Worcester, Massachusetts and changed the team name to the Sharks in 2006). On August 15, 2005, he was re-signed to a one-year contract as a restricted free agent by San Jose.

Schaefer made his first NHL appearance with the Sharks by being called up to replace the injured Vesa Toskala on October 26, 2005. He played 7 games in total that season, recording 5 wins. During that stint, Schaefer was the first Sharks goaltender to earn a win in a shootout, which had been implemented in the NHL, beginning that season in 2005–06. Schaefer subsequently bounced back and forth between San Jose and Cleveland serving as the Sharks' third string goaltender.

On February 27, 2007, he was traded to the Pittsburgh Penguins for a 2007 late-round draft pick. On July 3, 2007, Schaefer signed with the Minnesota Wild as a free agent. After two years with the Wild's minor league affiliate, the Houston Aeros, Nolan signed for Kontinental Hockey League club HC CSKA Moscow on August 5, 2009, for the 2009–10 season.

Schaefer returned to North America the following season, signing a one-year deal with the Boston Bruins on July 5, 2010. He was placed on waivers by Boston on October 11 to make room for Brian McGrattan. He cleared waivers and was assigned to the AHL's Providence Bruins.

On April 2, 2015, Schaefer signed a two-year contract to return to HC Ambrì-Piotta where he spent three previous seasons before playing as a backup with SC Bern in the 2014–15. Upon the beginning of the campaign, Schaefer sought a release from his contract with Ambri due to family reasons on August 3, 2015.

== Personal life ==
Schaefer is the younger brother of former NHL player Peter Schaefer, a left winger who played over 500 games in the NHL, split between the Vancouver Canucks, Ottawa Senators, and the Boston Bruins. Younger sister Falin was a member of the Canadian National Volleyball team.

== Career statistics ==
			Regular season									Playoffs
Season	Team	League	GP	W	L	T/OT	MIN	GA	SO	GAA	SV%	GP	W	L	MIN	GA	SO	GAA	SV%
1999–00	Providence College	HE	14	6	5	1	778	42	0	3.24	.904	—	—	—	—	—	—	—	—
2000–01	Providence College	HE	25	15	8	2	1529	63	3	2.47	.915	—	—	—	—	—	—	—	—
2001–02	Providence College	HE	35	11	18	5	2062	113	0	3.29	.905	—	—	—	—	—	—	—	—
2002–03	Providence College	HE	25	13	8	2	1440	71	0	2.96	.909	—	—	—	—	—	—	—	—
2003–04	Fresno Falcons	ECHL	12	5	5	0	654	34	1	3.12	.910	—	—	—	—	—	—	—	—
2003–04	Cleveland Barons	AHL	27	14	9	3	1592	62	2	2.34	.925	9	4	5	573	24	0	2.51	.927
2004–05	Cleveland Barons	AHL	43	17	23	1	2417	110	3	2.73	.907	—	—	—	—	—	—	—	—
2005–06	Cleveland Barons	AHL	36	12	21	2	2059	118	2	3.44	.887	—	—	—	—	—	—	—	—
2005–06	San Jose Sharks	NHL	7	5	1	0	352	11	1	1.87	.920	—	—	—	—	—	—	—	—
2006–07	Worcester Sharks	AHL	16	5	8	3	921	43	0	2.80	.878	—	—	—	—	—	—	—	—
2006–07	Hershey Bears	AHL	3	0	3	0	162	10	0	2.70	.897	—	—	—	—	—	—	—	—
2006–07	Wilkes-Barre/Scranton Penguins	AHL	15	9	5	0	804	30	1	2.24	.914	11	5	6	699	32	0	2.75	.908
2007–08	Houston Aeros	AHL	34	19	12	1	1980	68	6	2.06	.924	2	0	2	117	4	0	2.05	.934
2008–09	Houston Aeros	AHL	51	26	17	5	2711	114	1	2.52	.903	4	1	1	148	11	0	4.46	.823
2009–10	CSKA Moscow	KHL	22	6	10	1	1107	49	1	2.66	.895	1	0	1	44	2	0	2.73	.900
2010–11	Providence Bruins	AHL	30	9	16	1	1604	83	0	3.10	.897	—	—	—	—	—	—	—	—
2010–11	Hershey Bears	AHL	10	4	4	2	607	24	0	2.37	.915	—	—	—	—	—	—	—	—
2011–12	HC Ambrì-Piotta	NLA	24	8	16	0	1459	61	3	2.47	.903	—	—	—	—	—	—	—	—
2012–13	HC Ambrì-Piotta	NLA	36	12	22	0	2036	117	3	3.45	.895	—	—	—	—	—	—	—	—
2013–14	HC Ambrì-Piotta	NLA	26	12	11	0	1481	52	2	2.10	.938	2	0	2	119	9	0	4.54	.878
2014–15	SC Bern	NLA	9	5	3	0	522	19	0	2.19	.923	1	0	0	37	3	0	4.97	.750
AHL totals			265	115	119	15	12646	662	18	2.63	.907	26	10	14	1537	71	0	2.77	.911
NHL totals			7	5	1	0	352	11	1	1.87	.920	—	—	—	—	—	—	—	—

== Awards and honours ==
Award	Year
All-Hockey East Second Team	2000–01
AHCA East Second-Team All-American	2000–01
AHL Harry "Hap" Holmes Memorial Award	2007–08

== See also ==
- List of family relations in the National Hockey League
