= Kurt Kleinendorst =

American professional ice hockey coach (born 1960)

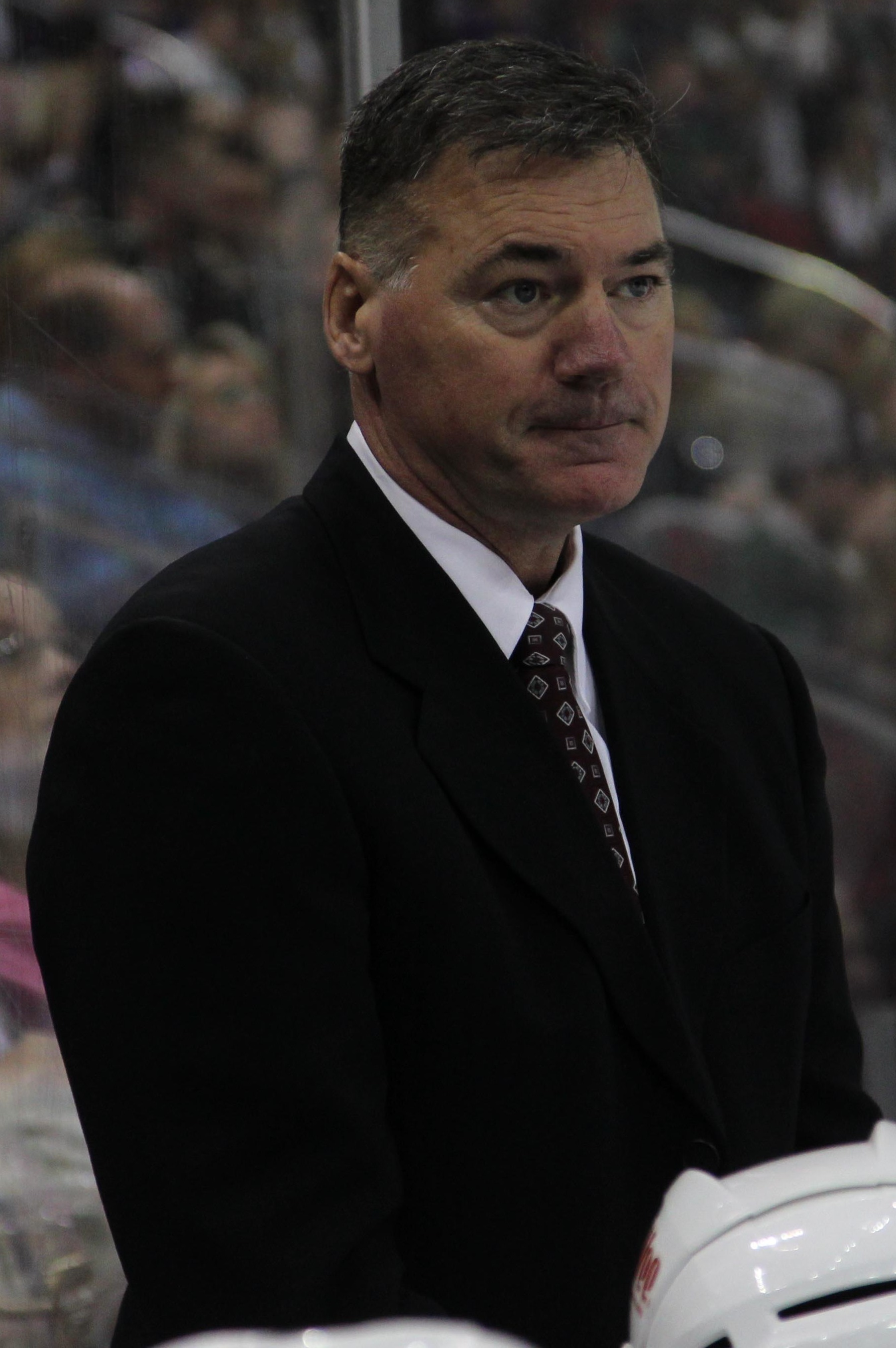
- Kleinendorst in 2014
- Born: December 31, 1960 (age 65) Grand Rapids, Minnesota, U.S.
- Height: 6 ft 2 in (188 cm)
- Weight: 190 lb (86 kg; 13 st 8 lb)
- Position: Forward
- Played for: Tulsa Oilers; Salt Lake Golden Eagles; Toledo Goaldiggers; New Haven Nighthawks; Indianapolis Checkers; ECD Iserlohn; Utica Devils; Rotterdam Panda's
- NHL draft: 77th overall, 1980; New York Rangers
- Playing career: 1983–1990
- Coaching career

Coaching career (HC unless noted)
- 1991–1994: Raleigh IceCaps
- 1994–1995: San Diego Gulls (assistant)
- 1995–1997: Raleigh IceCaps
- 1997–2000: Manchester Storm
- 2000–2002: New Jersey Devils (assistant)
- 2002–2006: New Jersey Devils (scout)
- 2006–2009: Lowell Devils
- 2009–2010: US NTDP
- 2010: US Under-18 Team
- 2010–2012: Binghamton Senators
- 2012–2013: Alabama-Huntsville
- 2013–2014: Iowa Wild
- 2015–2016: ERC Ingolstadt
- 2016–2017: Binghamton Senators
- 2017–2018: Belleville Senators
- 2019–2020: Nürnberg Ice Tigers
- 2022–: Iserlohn Roosters

Head coaching record
- Overall: 3–21–1 (.140) [college]

Kurt Kleinendorst (born December 31, 1960) is an American professional ice hockey coach. Since January 2022, he is head coach of the Iserlohn Roosters from the Deutsche Eishockey Liga (DEL). Kleinendorst played four seasons at Providence College and was inducted into the school's Athletic Hall of Fame in 1997.

== Playing career ==
Kleinendorst played for Providence College for four years, from 1979–80 to 1982–83, for Lou Lamoriello. He was selected in the fourth round (77th overall) of the 1980 NHL entry draft by the New York Rangers, but never played in the NHL. He was a member of the Tulsa Oilers (CHL) team that suspended operations on February 16, 1984, playing only road games for final six weeks of 1983–84 season. Despite this adversity, the team went on to win the Adams Cup. In 1986–87 he played with Iserlohn (Germany) and Peliitat Heinola (Finland) teams, and then with the Rotterdam Pandas in the Netherlands during the 1987–88 season, Ingolstadt (Germany) 1988–89, and continued to play minor league hockey through 1990.

== Coaching career ==
After his playing career, Kleinendorst was director of hockey operations and head coach for the Raleigh IceCaps of the East Coast Hockey League from 1991 to 1994, and again from 1995 to 1997. During the 1994–95 season he was the assistant coach and assistant general manager of the International Hockey League's San Diego Gulls. He was both general manager and head coach of the Manchester Storm of the UK Ice Hockey Superleague from 1997–98 to 1999–2000, where he was named Coach of the Year following the 1998–99 season.

Kleinendorst joined the New Jersey Devils organization in 2000–01 as an assistant coach under Larry Robinson. He was a scout for five years prior to assuming the head coaching position at organization's Lowell Devils AHL affiliate from 2006–07 to 2008–09. On July 13, 2009, it was announced that former Devils star John MacLean would replace Kleinendorst as the head coach of Lowell.

Kleinendorst was named head coach of USA Hockey National Team Development Program's Under-18 team for the 2010 season, leading the team to a gold medal at the 2010 IIHF World U18 Championships. When interviewed about taking the position with USA Hockey, Kleinendorst stated "I could’ve stayed with New Jersey as a scout, but I had already done that. And when Jim Johannson called and asked me to think about this job, it was good timing [...] These are high-school age players and I remember what my high school coaches [at Grand Rapids] meant to me. I know that the Development Program is one of the best programs anywhere and I’m intrigued by working with this age group." Kleinendorst had previously served as Team USA's assistant coach during the 2008 IIHF World Championship.

On August 6, 2010, the Ottawa Senators signed Kleinendorst to a two-year contract as head coach for their American Hockey League affiliate Binghamton Senators. Kleinendorst replaced Don Nachbaur, who resigned as head coach following the 2009–10 season. He led the team to the Calder Cup in 2011. He left the Senators' organization at the end of the contract in 2012.

On September 25, 2012, Kleinendorst was named head coach at the University of Alabama in Huntsville. On May 29, 2013, Kleinendorst resigned as coach and was succeeded by Mike Corbett.

On July 22, 2013, Kleinendorst was hired as head coach by the Iowa Wild, the AHL affiliate of the NHL's Minnesota Wild. He was sacked in November 2014 following a 2–10–0–0 start in the 2014–15 campaign.

Kleinendorst was announced as the new head coach of German DEL team ERC Ingolstadt on November 26, 2015 and had his contract renewed in March 2016. However, he returned to the Binghamton Senators on June 8, 2016, as head coach instead of staying with ERC Ingolstadt. The franchise became the Belleville Senators after his first season back and he was retained as head coach for 2017–18. After a 57–86–4–5 record over both seasons and failing to make the playoffs, his contract was not renewed.

On April 25, 2019, Kleinendorst returned abroad to Germany after he was announced as head coach of the Nürnberg Ice Tigers of the DEL. On June 21, 2020, he resigned from the Ice Tigers' head coaching position citing the desire to spend more time with his family.

On January 11, 2022, Kleinendorst returned to the DEL. He took over the struggling Iserlohn Roosters from Brad Tapper. This marked Kleinendorst's return to Iserlohn, where he had been a player during the 1986–87 season.

== Personal ==
Kleinendorst and his wife, Deon (Barbara), have four children: Ryan, Kollin, Kaitlyn, and Jake. Their daughter Katie played lacrosse for North Andover High School and ice hockey for North American Hockey Academy in Stowe, Vermont. As of 2013 she was playing hockey at the University of New Hampshire for the New Hampshire Wildcats under a scholarship. He is the younger brother of former NHL player Scot Kleinendorst, and the 5th of a family of 6.

== Head coaching record ==
Record table
Season	Team	Overall	Conference	Standing	Postseason
Alabama-Huntsville Chargers Independent (2012–2013)
2012–13	Alabama-Huntsville	3–21–1			
Alabama-Huntsville:		3–21–1			
Total:		3–21–1			
National champion Postseason invitational champion Conference regular season champion Conference regular season and conference tournament champion Division regular season champion Division regular season and conference tournament champion Conference tournament champion

== Awards and honors ==
Award	Year
All-ECAC Hockey Second Team	1981–82
All-ECAC Hockey First Team	1982–83
AHCA East All-American	1982–83

Sporting positions
Preceded by Tom Rowe	Head coach of the Lowell Devils; 2006–2009	Succeeded by John MacLean
Preceded by Don Nachbaur; Luke Richardson	Head coach of the Binghamton Senators; 2010–2012; 2016–2017	Succeeded by Luke Richardson; Position abolished
Preceded by Position created	Head coach of the Iowa Wild; 2013–2014	Succeeded by John Torchetti
Preceded by Position created	Head coach of the Belleville Senators; 2017–2018	Succeeded by Troy Mann

Awards and achievements
Preceded by Darren Eliot	ECAC Hockey Most Outstanding Player in Tournament; 1981	Succeeded by Mark Davidner
