= Mikael Burakovsky =

Swedish ice hockey player

- Born: June 23, 1977 (age 48) Malmö, Sweden
- Height: 5 ft 11 in (180 cm)
- Weight: 176 lb (80 kg; 12 st 8 lb)
- Position: Right wing
- Shot: Left
- Played for: Malmö Redhawks; VIK Västerås HK
- NHL draft: Undrafted
- Playing career: 1994–2010

Mikael Burakovsky (born June 23, 1977) is a Swedish former professional ice hockey player who played 16 seasons as a professional, including 111 games in the top Swedish league Elitserien between 1995 and 1997.

== Personal life ==
Burakovsky's father, Benny, (who died on December 14, 2007, at the age of 64) was a hockey coach. Mikael's brother Robert was also a professional hockey player, and Mikael's nephew, André, was a top-rated prospect who was selected by the Washington Capitals in the first round (23rd overall) of the 2013 NHL entry draft and currently plays for the Chicago Blackhawks.
