= Tim Heed =

Swedish ice hockey player (born 1991)

- Born: January 27, 1991 (age 35) Gothenburg, Sweden
- Height: 5 ft 11 in (180 cm)
- Weight: 185 lb (84 kg; 13 st 3 lb)
- Position: Defence
- Shoots: Right
- NL team Former teams: HC Ambrì-Piotta; Södertälje SK; Växjö Lakers; Skellefteå AIK; San Jose Sharks; HC Lugano; Spartak Moscow
- National team: Sweden
- NHL draft: 132nd overall, 2010; Anaheim Ducks
- Playing career: 2009–present

Tim Heed (born January 27, 1991) is a Swedish professional ice hockey defenceman who is currently playing with HC Ambrì-Piotta of the National League (NL). Heed was originally selected by the Anaheim Ducks 132nd overall in the 2010 NHL entry draft.

== Playing career ==
Heed was a product of Södertälje SK and made his debut in the top-tier Swedish Hockey League (SHL) with the club during the 2009–10 season. In the following years he also spent time on loan with the Växjö Lakers and the Malmö Redhawks in the second highest ice hockey league in Sweden, HockeyAllsvenskan, and in the SHL.

In 2013, he joined SHL side Skellefteå AIK and won the Swedish championship in his first year with the team. In 2014–15 and 2015–16, he reached the SHL finals with Skellefteå, while receiving SHL Defenseman of the Year honors in 2014–15. Heed also competed in the Champions Hockey League with the team.

With his NHL rights not retained by the Anaheim Ducks, Heed was signed as a free agent by the San Jose Sharks on a one-year, two-way contract on May 24, 2016.

He signed a new two-year contract on June 19, 2017. He was later re-signed by the Sharks to a one-year contract on July 1, 2019.

On August 20, 2020, as an impending free agent from the Sharks, Heed was signed to a three-month contract through November 15, 2020 by HC Lugano of the National League (NL). Heed produced from the blueline with Lugano, posting 14 goals and 34 points through 47 regular season games.

As a free agent, Heed moved to the Russian KHL, agreeing to a two-year contract with HC Spartak Moscow, on 6 May 2021.

Following one season with Spartak, Heed opted to leave the KHL and return to the Swiss NL by signing a two-year contract with HC Ambrì-Piotta on 20 July 2022.

== Personal life ==
Tim's father Jonas Heed, who also played defence, was selected by Chicago in the sixth round of the 1985 NHL entry draft.

== Career statistics ==
=== Regular season and playoffs ===
			Regular season					Playoffs
Season	Team	League	GP	G	A	Pts	PIM	GP	G	A	Pts	PIM
2007–08	Södertälje SK	J18	22	4	15	19	22	—	—	—	—	—
2007–08	Södertälje SK	J18 Allsv	14	0	9	9	12	2	0	0	0	4
2007–08	Södertälje SK	J20	2	0	0	0	0	—	—	—	—	—
2008–09	Södertälje SK	J18	11	6	8	14	6	—	—	—	—	—
2008–09	Södertälje SK	J18 Allsv	3	1	2	3	4	3	3	2	5	2
2008–09	Södertälje SK	J20	32	1	7	8	10	2	0	1	1	0
2009–10	Södertälje SK	J20	32	8	29	37	20	—	—	—	—	—
2009–10	Södertälje SK	SEL	27	1	9	10	2	—	—	—	—	—
2010–11	Södertälje SK	J20	2	0	2	2	2	—	—	—	—	—
2010–11	Södertälje SK	SEL	12	1	0	1	0	—	—	—	—	—
2010–11	Växjö Lakers	Allsv	29	3	20	23	8	—	—	—	—	—
2011–12	Malmö Redhawks	Allsv	47	4	26	30	10	6	1	2	3	0
2012–13	Växjö Lakers	J20	4	2	4	6	0	—	—	—	—	—
2012–13	Växjö Lakers	SEL	10	0	0	0	2	—	—	—	—	—
2012–13	VIK Västerås HK	Allsv	33	5	8	13	12	8	0	2	2	0
2013–14	Skellefteå AIK	SHL	40	1	4	5	2	2	0	0	0	0
2014–15	Skellefteå AIK	SHL	50	10	27	37	10	15	2	9	11	0
2015–16	Skellefteå AIK	SHL	52	8	15	23	2	16	3	6	9	4
2016–17	San Jose Barracuda	AHL	55	14	42	56	12	15	3	7	10	6
2016–17	San Jose Sharks	NHL	1	0	0	0	0	—	—	—	—	—
2017–18	San Jose Sharks	NHL	29	3	8	11	8	—	—	—	—	—
2017–18	San Jose Barracuda	AHL	10	1	4	5	6	4	0	3	3	4
2018–19	San Jose Sharks	NHL	37	2	11	13	10	3	0	0	0	0
2019–20	San Jose Sharks	NHL	38	1	4	5	2	—	—	—	—	—
2020–21	HC Lugano	NL	47	14	20	34	10	5	0	0	0	0
2021–22	Spartak Moscow	KHL	45	3	23	26	8	5	0	0	0	4
2022–23	HC Ambrì-Piotta	NL	44	10	14	24	8	—	—	—	—	—
2023–24	HC Ambrì-Piotta	NL	45	6	23	29	8	4	1	4	5	0
2024–25	HC Ambrì-Piotta	NL	52	9	29	38	16	4	1	5	6	0
2025–26	HC Ambrì-Piotta	NL	52	2	20	22	6	—	—	—	—	—
SHL totals			191	21	55	76	18	33	5	15	20	4
NHL totals			105	6	23	29	20	3	0	0	0	0

Medal record

Representing Sweden

Ice hockey

World Championships
Bronze medal – third place	2024 Czech Republic	

=== International ===
Year	Team	Event	Result	GP	G	A	Pts	PIM
2024	Sweden	WC	3rd place, bronze medalist(s)	10	0	3	3	4
Senior totals				10	0	3	3	4

== Awards and honors ==
Awards	Year
SHL
Le Mat Trophy (Skellefteå AIK)	2014
Salming Trophy	2015
AHL
Second All-Star Team	2017
