= Mark Hunter (ice hockey) =

Canadian ice hockey player (born 1962)

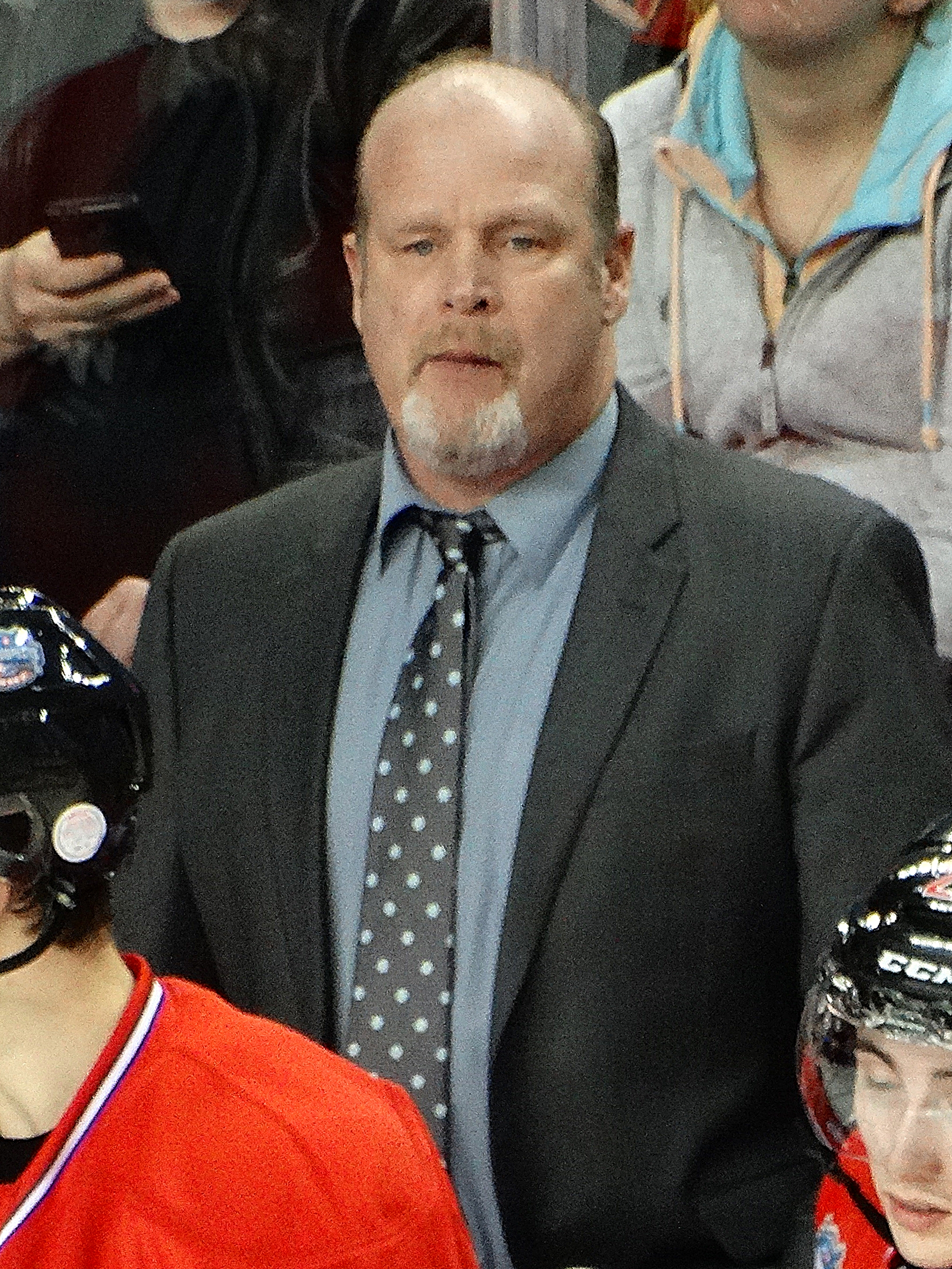
- Hunter in 2014
- Born: November 12, 1962 (age 63) Petrolia, Ontario, Canada
- Height: 6 ft 0 in (183 cm)
- Weight: 205 lb (93 kg; 14 st 9 lb)
- Position: Right wing
- Shot: Right
- Played for: Montreal Canadiens; St. Louis Blues; Calgary Flames; Hartford Whalers; Washington Capitals
- NHL draft: 7th overall, 1981; Montreal Canadiens
- Playing career: 1981–1993

Mark William Hunter (born November 12, 1962) is a Canadian professional ice hockey executive, coach, and former player. He currently is the owner and general manager for the London Knights of the Ontario Hockey League (OHL). Hunter was born in Petrolia, Ontario, but grew up in nearby (13 km) Oil Springs, Ontario, and was one of three brothers, with Dave and Dale, to play in the NHL. Hunter won the Stanley Cup in 1989 with the Calgary Flames.

== Junior hockey ==
=== Brantford Alexanders ===
Hunter began his junior hockey career with the Brantford Alexanders for the 1979–80 season where in his rookie season he finished fifth in team scoring, getting 34 goals and 89 points in 66 games, while getting 171 penalty minutes, helping Brantford to the playoffs. In 11 postseason games, Hunter had two goals and 10 points.

He returned to the Alexanders for the 1980–81 season, as Hunter appeared in 53 games, scoring 39 goals and 79 points to finish sixth in team scoring, while having a team high 157 penalty minutes. In six playoff games, Hunter had three goals and six points. After the season, Hunter was selected in the first round, seventh overall by the Montreal Canadiens in the 1981 NHL entry draft.

== Professional career ==
=== Montreal Canadiens ===
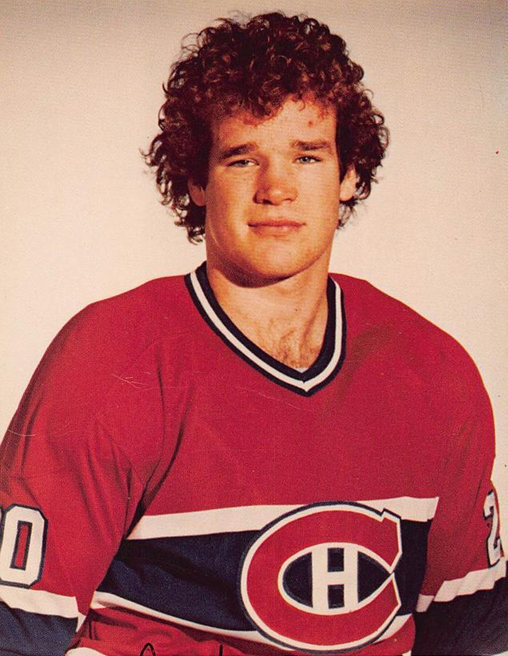
1981 photo of Hunter for Montreal Canadiens

Hunter made the NHL as an 18-year-old with the Montreal Canadiens for the 1981–82 season. In 71 games with the Canadiens, Hunter had 18 goals and 29 points, while finishing second on the team with 143 penalty minutes, helping Montreal into the playoffs. In five playoff games against the Quebec Nordiques, Hunter had no points and 20 penalty minutes as the Canadiens lost to their provincial rivals.

Hunter appeared in only 31 games for the Canadiens during the 1982–83 season, scoring eight goals and 16 points, while accumulating 73 penalty minutes. He suffered a season ending knee injury on December 26, 1982 in a game against the Quebec Nordiques.

Hunter had another injury plagued season in 1983–84, playing in 22 games, scoring six goals and 10 points. Hunter was healthy for the playoffs, where he scored two goals and three points in 14 games, helping the Canadiens reach the Wales Conference finals, where they lost to the New York Islanders.

He was healthy during the 1984–85 season, as Hunter played in 72 games, scoring 21 goals and 33 points, while getting 123 penalty minutes, the second highest total on the team. In the playoffs, Hunter had three assists in 11 games, however, Montreal lost to the Quebec Nordiques in the Adams Division finals.

On June 15, 1985, the Canadiens traded Hunter, Mike Dark, and their second, third, fifth and sixth round draft picks in the 1985 NHL entry draft to the St. Louis Blues for the Blues first, second, fourth, fifth and sixth round draft picks in the 1985 NHL entry draft.

=== St. Louis Blues ===
Hunter joined the St. Louis Blues for the 1985–86 season, where he broke out offensively, scoring a team high 44 goals and finished second on team scoring with 74 points, helping St. Louis qualify for the playoffs. Hunter appeared in the 1986 NHL All-Star Game held in Hartford, Connecticut, going pointless as the Campbell Conference lost 4–3 in overtime to the Wales Conference. In the playoffs, Hunter had seven goals and 14 points in 19 games, helping the Blues reach the Campbell Conference finals, where they lost in seven games to the Calgary Flames.

Hunter had another solid season for the Blues in 1986–87, scoring 36 goals and 69 points to finish third in team scoring in 74 games. In the playoffs, Hunter had three assists in five games as the Blues lost to the Toronto Maple Leafs in the first round.

In 1987–88, Hunter missed 14 games due to injuries, however, he managed to break the 30 goal plateau for the third consecutive season, scoring 32 goals and 63 points in 66 games. In the postseason, Hunter had two goals and five points in five games, as the Blues lost to the Detroit Red Wings in the Norris Division finals.

On September 6, 1988, St. Louis traded Hunter, Doug Gilmour, Steve Bozek and Mike Dark to the Calgary Flames for Mike Bullard, Craig Coxe and Tim Corkery.

=== Calgary Flames ===
Hunter saw his offensive production drop in his first season with the Calgary Flames in 1988–89, as he scored 22 goals and 30 points, which was his lowest point total since the 1983–84 season, in 66 games. In ten playoff games, Hunter had two goals and four points, as he helped the Flames win the 1989 Stanley Cup Final over the Montreal Canadiens.

Hunter missed the majority of the 1989–90 season due to knee surgery. In ten games with the Flames, Hunter had two goals and five points and did not suit up for the team for the playoffs.

Hunter returned from his knee injury for the 1990–91 season, as in 57 games, he scored 10 goals and 25 points for Calgary. On March 5, 1991, the Flames traded Hunter to the Hartford Whalers for Carey Wilson.

=== Hartford Whalers ===
Hunter finished the 1990–91 season with the Hartford Whalers, where in 11 games, he scored four goals and seven points. In six playoff games, Hunter had five goals and six points as the Whalers lost to the Boston Bruins in the first round of the playoffs.

In 63 games with the Whalers in 1991–92, Hunter scored 10 goals and 23 points, helping the team reach the playoffs. In four playoff games, he did not earn any points, as the Whalers lost to the Montreal Canadiens in the first round.

On June 15, 1992, Hartford traded Hunter and Yvon Corriveau to the Washington Capitals for Nick Kypreos.

=== Washington Capitals ===
Hunter appeared in only seven games with the Washington Capitals during the 1992–93 season, earning no points for the team. He finished the year with the Baltimore Skipjacks of the AHL, where he had 13 goals and 31 points in 28 games with Baltimore. In seven playoff games, Hunter had three goals and four points for the Skipjacks.

Hunter retired from hockey after the season. In 628 career games, he scored 213 goals and 171 assists for 384 points, while accumulating 1426 penalty minutes.

=== Career statistics ===
			Regular season					Playoffs
Season	Team	League	GP	G	A	Pts	PIM	GP	G	A	Pts	PIM
1978–79	Petrolia Jets	WOHL	44	35	44	79	160	—	—	—	—	—
1979–80	Brantford Alexanders	OMJHL	66	34	55	89	171	11	2	8	10	27
1980–81	Brantford Alexanders	OHL	53	39	40	79	157	6	3	3	6	27
1981–82	Montreal Canadiens	NHL	71	18	11	29	143	5	0	0	0	20
1982–83	Montreal Canadiens	NHL	31	8	8	16	73	—	—	—	—	—
1983–84	Montreal Canadiens	NHL	22	6	4	10	42	14	2	1	3	69
1984–85	Montreal Canadiens	NHL	72	21	12	33	123	11	0	3	3	13
1985–86	St. Louis Blues	NHL	78	44	30	74	171	19	7	7	14	48
1986–87	St. Louis Blues	NHL	74	36	33	69	167	5	0	3	3	10
1987–88	St. Louis Blues	NHL	66	32	31	63	136	5	2	3	5	24
1988–89	Calgary Flames	NHL	66	22	8	30	194	10	2	2	4	23
1989–90	Calgary Flames	NHL	10	2	3	5	39	—	—	—	—	—
1990–91	Calgary Flames	NHL	57	10	15	25	125	—	—	—	—	—
1990–91	Hartford Whalers	NHL	11	4	3	7	40	6	5	1	6	17
1991–92	Hartford Whalers	NHL	63	10	13	23	159	4	0	0	0	6
1992–93	Washington Capitals	NHL	7	0	0	0	14	—	—	—	—	—
1992–93	Baltimore Skipjacks	AHL	28	13	18	31	66	—	—	—	—	—
NHL totals			628	213	171	384	1,426	79	18	20	38	230

== Coaching career ==
=== Sarnia Sting ===
Hunter became the coach of the Sarnia Sting in the OHL midway through the 1994–95 season. He led the Sting to a 17–19–2 record in 38 games, helping the team reach the playoffs. Sarnia was then swept by the Windsor Spitfires in the first round of the playoffs.

In the 1995–96 season, Hunter led the Sting to a 39–23–4 record, finishing in second place in the Western Division. Sarnia swept the Sault Ste. Marie Greyhounds in the first round of the playoffs, however, the Sting lost to the Peterborough Petes in the second round. After the season, Hunter left his head coaching position with the Sting to become the head coach of the St. John's Maple Leafs.

=== St. John's Maple Leafs ===
Hunter became the head coach of the St. John's Maple Leafs of the AHL for the 1996–97 season. Hunter led the Maple Leafs to a 36–28–10–6 record to finish in first place in the Canadian Division. In the playoffs, St. John's defeated the Binghamton Rangers in the first round, however, the Maple Leafs were eliminated in seven games by the Hamilton Bulldogs in the second round. After the season, Hunter left St. John's and returned to the Sarnia Sting.

=== Sarnia Sting ===
Hunter returned to the Sarnia Sting of the OHL for the 1997–98 season. He helped the club to the playoffs, as they finished with a 32–21–13 record, third place in the Western Division. They lost to the Plymouth Whalers in five games in the first round of the playoffs.

The Sting improved in the 1998–99 season, as the team finished with a 37–25–6 to finish in second place in the West Division. Sarnia had a disappointing playoff result though, losing in six games to the London Knights in the first round.

In 1999–2000, the Sting fell to a record of 33–27–8–0, finishing in third place in the West Division. In the postseason, the Sting lost to the Windsor Spitfires in seven game in the first round.

=== London Knights ===
Hunter became co-owner of the London Knights with his brother Dale Hunter, where he served as an assistant coach and general manager of the club while Dale was the head coach of the Knights. On November 28, 2011, Mark became the head coach of the Knights when Dale left to become the head coach of the Washington Capitals. Hunter led the Knights to a 29–13–0 record over their last 42 games, leading the club to first place in the Midwest division In the postseason, the Knights put together a 16–3 record to win the J. Ross Robertson Cup for the second time in franchise history. At the 2012 Memorial Cup held in Shawinigan, Quebec, the Knights had a record of 2–1 in the round-robin portion of the tournament, which was good enough for the team to advance directly to the championship game. In the final game, the Knights lost to the Shawinigan Cataractes in overtime by a score of 2–1.

=== Head coaching record ===
Team	Year	Regular season							Postseason
Team	Year	G	W	L	T	OTL	Pts	Finish	Result
SAR	1994–95	38	17	19	2	-	36	3rd in West	Lost in first round
SAR	1995–96	66	39	23	4	-	82	2nd in West	Lost in second round
SJML	1996–97	80	36	28	10	6	88	1st in Canadian	Lost in second round
SAR	1997–98	66	32	21	13	-	77	3rd in West	Lost in first round
SAR	1998–99	68	37	25	6	-	80	2nd in West	Lost in first round
SAR	1999–2000	68	33	27	8	0	74	3rd in West	Lost in first round
LDN	2011–12	42	29	13	-	0	58	1st in Midwest	Won J. Ross Robertson Cup
OHL Total		348	187	128	33	0	407	1 division title	
AHL Total		80	36	28	10	6	88	1 division title	

== Executive career ==
=== London Knights ===
Hunter spent twelve years as owner, vice-president, and general manager of the London Knights in the OHL. He departed his management role with the team in October 2014. After 4 years with the Maple Leafs, he returned to his position of general manager in 2018.

=== Toronto Maple Leafs ===
On October 21, 2014, Hunter was announced as the director of player personnel for the Toronto Maple Leafs. On April 12, 2015, after the firing of general manager Dave Nonis, Hunter along with Kyle Dubas were named as co-interim general managers of the Maple Leafs, and they continued as assistant general managers after the Maple Leafs hired Lou Lamoriello. Lamoriello left the Maple Leafs in April 2018 and Dubas was named Toronto general manager. Shortly afterwards, Hunter agreed to mutually terminate the contract with the Maple Leafs.

== Personal life ==
Hunter has two brothers. Dale Hunter and Dave Hunter also played in the NHL. Their father also scouts for the Knights. Hunter's son Garett Hunter played parts of three seasons for the London Knights from 2007 to 2010.

Preceded by Doug Wickenheiser	Montreal Canadiens first-round draft pick 1981	Succeeded by Gilbert Delorme
