= Ed Cristofoli =

Canadian ice hockey player (born 1967)

- Born: May 14, 1967 (age 58); Trail, British Columbia, Canada
- Height: 6 ft 2 in (188 cm)
- Weight: 203 lb (92 kg; 14 st 7 lb)
- Position: Right wing
- Shot: Left
- Played for: Montreal Canadiens
- NHL draft: 142nd overall, 1985; Montreal Canadiens
- Playing career: 1989–1991

Edmund James Cristofoli (born May 14, 1967) is a Canadian former professional ice hockey right winger. In the 1989–90 season, he played in 9 games in the National Hockey League for the Montreal Canadiens. Before playing pro hockey, Cristofoli played four seasons at the University of Denver where he set a Denver record for career games played.

== Career statistics ==
=== Regular season and playoffs ===
			Regular season					Playoffs
Season	Team	League	GP	G	A	Pts	PIM	GP	G	A	Pts	PIM
1983–84	Penticton Knights	BCJHL	55	18	46	64	89	—	—	—	—	—
1984–85	Penticton Knights	BCJHL	48	36	34	70	58	—	—	—	—	—
1985–86	University of Denver	WCHA	46	10	9	19	32	—	—	—	—	—
1986–87	University of Denver	WCHA	40	14	15	29	52	—	—	—	—	—
1987–88	University of Denver	WCHA	38	12	27	39	64	—	—	—	—	—
1988–89	University of Denver	WCHA	43	20	19	39	50	—	—	—	—	—
1989–90	Montreal Canadiens	NHL	9	0	1	1	4	—	—	—	—	—
1989–90	Sherbrooke Canadiens	AHL	57	16	19	35	31	12	2	4	6	14
1990–91	Fredericton Canadiens	AHL	34	7	16	23	24	—	—	—	—	—
1990–91	Kansas City Blades	IHL	22	3	1	4	6	—	—	—	—	—
AHL totals			91	23	35	58	55	12	2	4	6	14
NHL totals			9	0	1	1	4	—	—	—	—	—
