= André Burakovsky =

Swedish ice hockey player (born 1995)

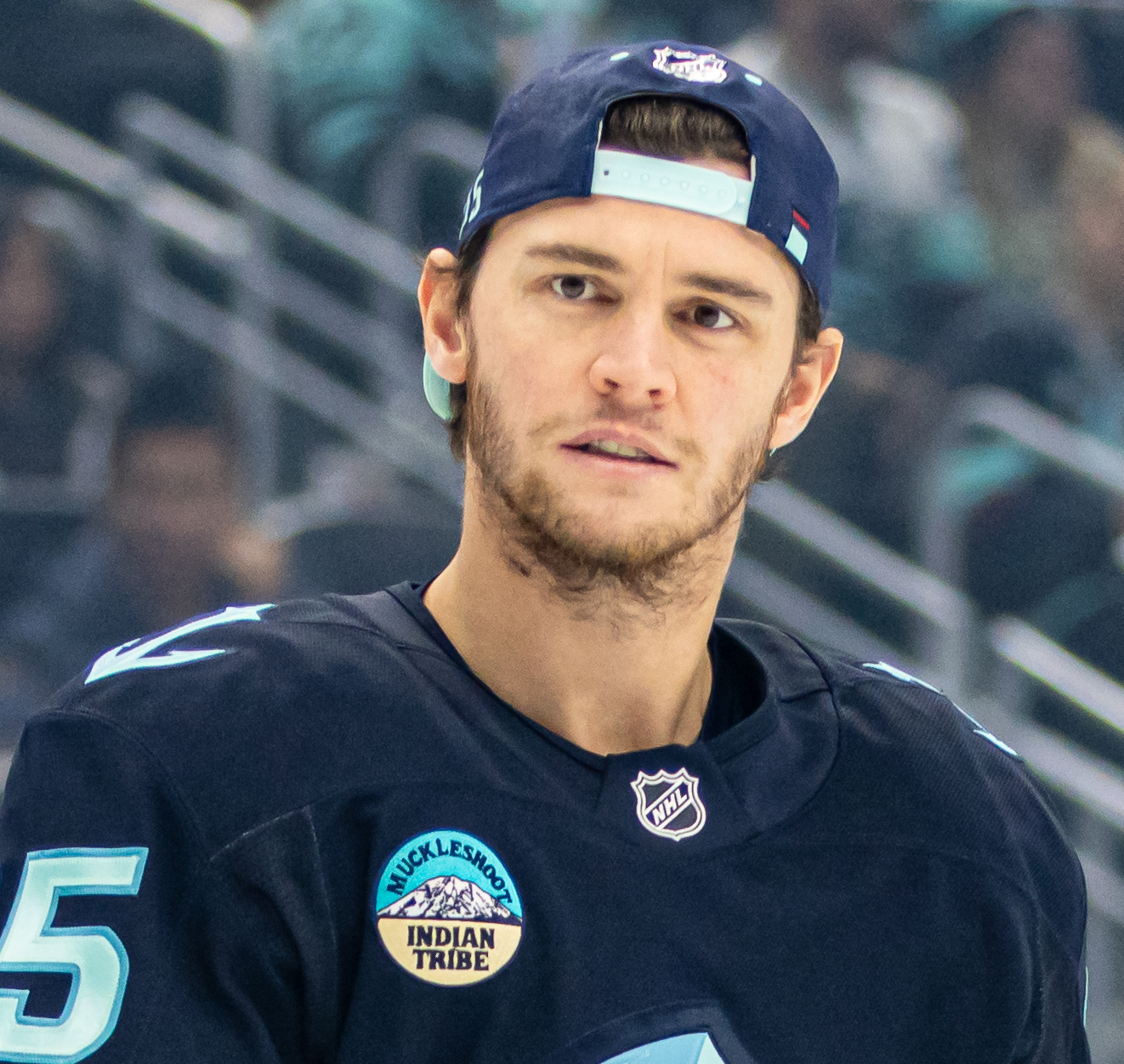
- Burakovsky in 2024
- Born: 9 February 1995 (age 31) Klagenfurt, Austria
- Height: 6 ft 3 in (191 cm)
- Weight: 203 lb (92 kg; 14 st 7 lb)
- Position: Forward
- Shoots: Left
- NHL team Former teams: Ottawa Senators; Washington Capitals; Colorado Avalanche; Seattle Kraken; Chicago Blackhawks
- National team: Sweden
- NHL draft: 23rd overall, 2013; Washington Capitals
- Playing career: 2011–present

André Burakovsky (also stylized as Burakowsky, born 9 February 1995) is a Swedish professional ice hockey player who is a forward for the Ottawa Senators of the National Hockey League (NHL). He previously played for the Washington Capitals, who drafted him 23rd overall in 2013, the Colorado Avalanche, who acquired his rights and consequently signed him during the 2019 offseason, the Seattle Kraken, and the Chicago Blackhawks. Burakovsky is a two-time Stanley Cup champion, winning with the Capitals in 2018 and the Avalanche in 2022.

== Playing career ==
Burakovsky made his professional debut during the 2011–12 season with the Malmö Redhawks of HockeyAllsvenskan when he was just 16 years old. In ten games with Malmö, he recorded just one assist for one point. He split the season with Malmö Jr. of the J20 Nationell, where he tallied 17 goals and 25 assists for 42 points in 47 games. Burakovsky was selected in the third round (102nd overall) by SKA Saint Petersburg of the Kontinental Hockey League (KHL) in the 2012 KHL Junior Draft. He split the 2012–13 season between the HockeyAllsvenskan and J20 Nationell leagues for the Redhawks, recording three goals and seven points in 13 games with the junior team and four goals and 11 points in 43 games with the senior team. In 2013, he was selected by the Washington Capitals of the National Hockey League (NHL) in the first round, 23rd overall, of the NHL entry draft and by the Erie Otters of the Ontario Hockey League (OHL) in the Canadian Hockey League (CHL)'s Import Draft. He joined the Otters for the 2013–14 season where he appeared in 57 games, scoring 41 goals and 87 points. The Otters qualified for the playoffs and advanced to the Western Conference finals where they were knocked out by the Guelph Storm. Burakovsky made 14 playoff appearances for the Otters, marking ten goals and 13 points.

=== Washington Capitals (2014–2019) ===
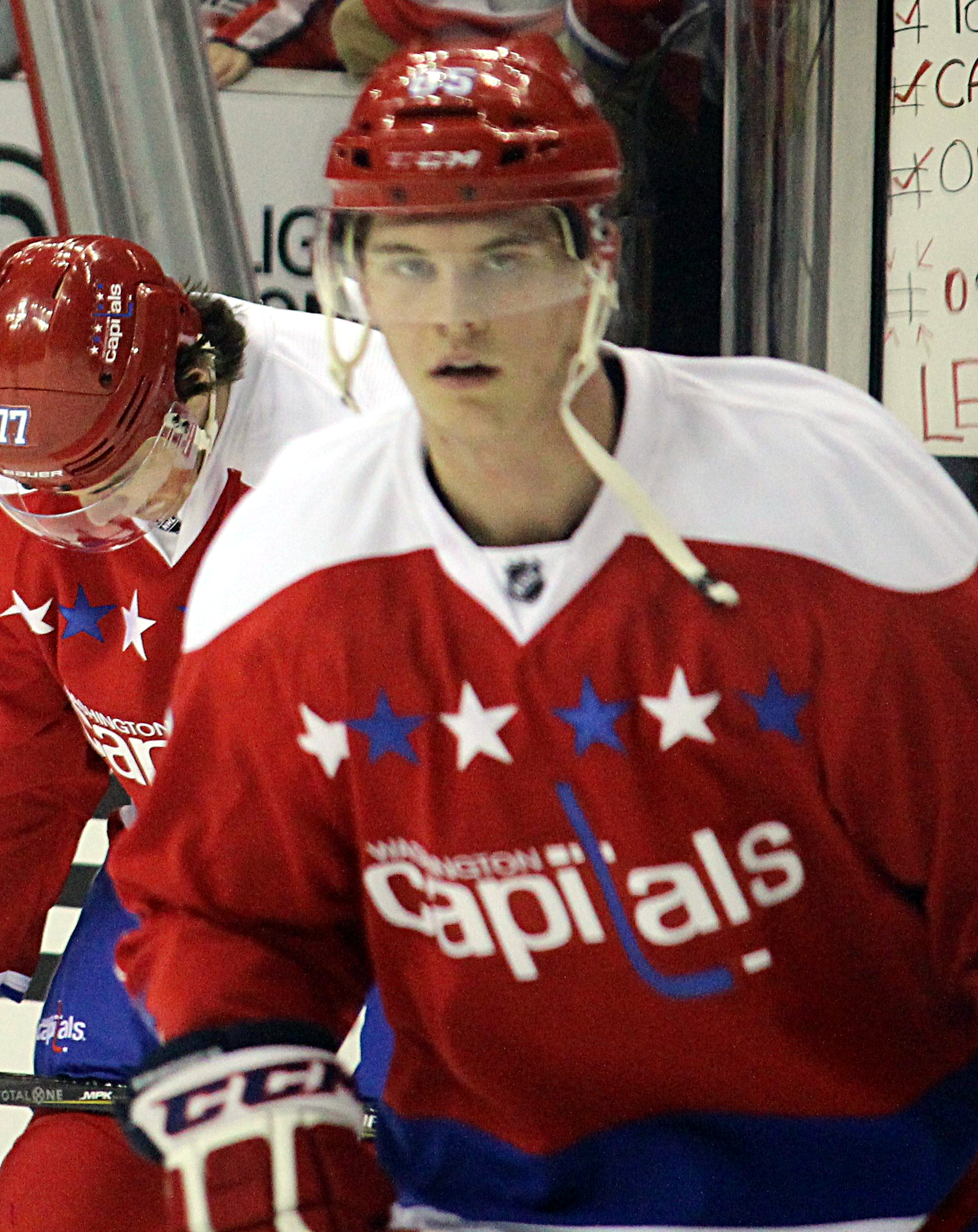
Burakovsky with the Capitals in April 2016

On 4 September 2013, Burakovsky signed a three-year entry-level contract with the Capitals. After spending one year in the OHL, Burakovsky opened the 2014–15 season with the Capitals, having been moved to the centre position from the wing. Burakovsky scored his first NHL goal in his NHL debut on 9 October 2014, against Dustin Tokarski of the Montreal Canadiens. He became the second-fastest Capitals player to score their first career NHL goal, and the 13th Capitals player to score in his NHL debut. Despite starting off strong, by December he was scratched from the lineup for five out of six games before being sent down to Washington's American Hockey League (AHL) affiliate, the Hershey Bears, on 19 December. After a brief stint in the AHL, he was recalled on 22 December. He remained with the Capitals until the NHL trade deadline in March 2015 when he was assigned to Hershey to make room for the newly-acquired Curtis Glencross. He had three brief recalls, one in March and two in April as an injury replacement. At times, he saw playing time on the first line with Alexander Ovechkin and Nicklas Bäckström, but bounced around the lineup, and by the end of the seaosn, ended up on the fourth line alongside with Michael Latta and Stanislav Galiev. In 53 games with Washington, he tallied nine goals and 22 points. In Hershey he tallied three goals and seven points in 13 games. The Capitals made the 2015 Stanley Cup playoffs and faced the New York Islanders in the opening round. Burakovsky made his NHL playoff debut on 21 April in game on versus the Islanders. After eliminating the Islanders, the team moved on to the second round to face the New York Rangers. Playing on a line with Troy Brouwer and Jay Beagle, he marked his first postseason point assisting on Beagle's goal in a 1–0 game three win. He recorded his first two NHL postseason goals in the following game on 6 May against Henrik Lundqvist in a 2–1 win. However, the Rangers eliminated the Capitals and Burakovsky was loaned back to Hershey. He appeared in one playoff game with Hershey before they were eliminated by the Hartford Wolf Pack. In 2015–16 he started the season as the team's second line centre, filling in for the injured Bäckström. However, upon Bäckström's return, he was bumped down to the fourth line again on the wing. He struggled on the fourth line and his coach, Barry Trotz, bounced him between lines trying to find something that worked for him. By January, he was out of the slump and on the second line alongside Evgeny Kuznetsov and Justin Williams. He appeared in 79 games, scoring 17 goals and 38 points. The Capitals made the playoffs and Burakovsky was placed on the third line alongside Jason Chimera and Mike Richards for the run. They advanced to the second round where they were eliminated by the Pittsburgh Penguins. In 12 playoff games, Burakovsky marked one goal.

Early in the 2016–17 season, Burakovsky was placed on a line with Bäckström and Marcus Johansson, colloquially named the "Tre Kronor line". However, after a brief stint on the team's top line, he found himself on the third line alongside Lars Eller and Brett Connolly in January 2017. On 22 January, against the Dallas Stars, Burakovsky scored the game's first goal for the fourth consecutive game, tying the NHL record for the most consecutive team games scoring the first goal. On 9 February, he suffered an upper body injury in a game against the Detroit Red Wings and missed 15 games, returning on 18 March. He finished the season with 12 goals and 35 points in 64 games. The Capitals once again made the playoffs, and for the second consecutive season, were eliminated by the Penguins in the second round. In 13 playoff games, Burakovsky marked three goals and six points. On 4 July, he agreed to a two-year, $6-million contract with the Capitals.

During the 2017–18 season, on 24 October, Burakovsky required surgery on his thumb after it was injured in a game against the Florida Panthers and was expected to miss six to eight weeks. He returned to the Capitals lineup on 8 December after missing 20 games. He appeared in 56 games, recording 12 goals and 25 points. Burakovsky was sidelined with an injury during the 2018 playoffs and missed the remainder of the Capitals first round against the Columbus Blue Jackets. After missing ten playoff games, and going pointless upon returning, Burakovsky scored two goals in game seven against Andrei Vasilevskiy of the Tampa Bay Lightning to help send the Capitals to the 2018 Stanley Cup Final. He admitted to hiring a sports psychologist, saying, "I think when I'm doing something bad, I'm thinking about it for a long time, and it just sits in my head. That's something I have to work on in the summer." Despite his struggles, Burakovsky won the Stanley Cup with the Capitals on 7 June after beating the Vegas Golden Knights in five games in the Stanley Cup Final. In 13 playoff games, he scored two goals and six points. In 2018–19, he struggled to begin the season, going without a goal in the team's first eight games and being demoted to the team's fourth line. In December he was scratched from the lineup for nearly two weeks, sitting for four games. Upon his return, he slotted into the lineup on the third line alongside Eller and Connolly. In 76 games, he scored 12 goals and 25 points. The Capitals returned to the playoffs but failed to go far, getting knocked out in the first round by the Carolina Hurricanes. In seven playoff games, Burakovksy marked one goal and two points.

=== Colorado Avalanche (2019–2022) ===
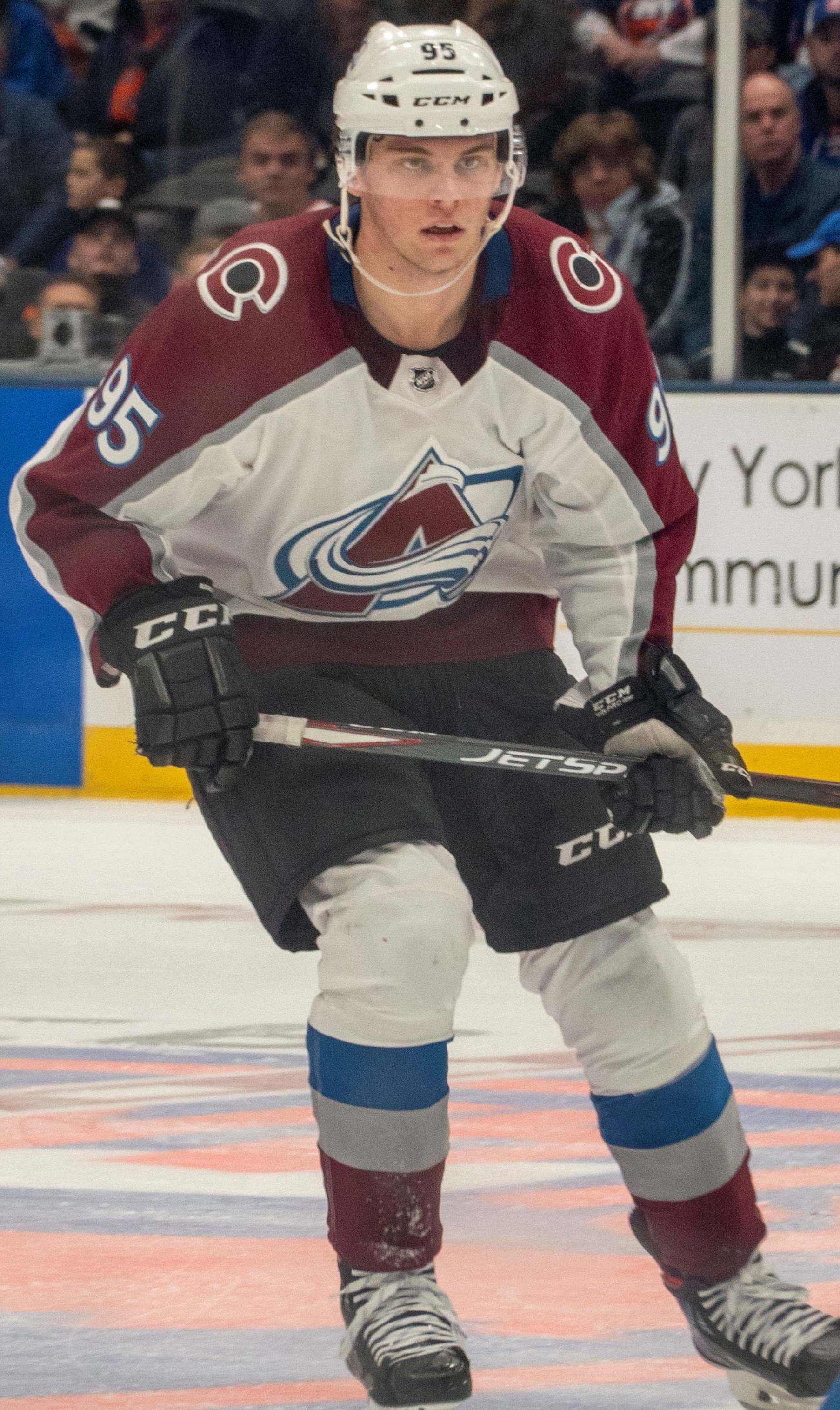
Burakovsky with the Avalanche in January 2020

On 28 June 2019, Burakovsky was traded to the Colorado Avalanche in exchange for Scott Kosmachuk and a second and third-round pick in 2020. On 15 July 2019, Burakovsky agreed to his qualifying offer, accepting a one-year, $3.25 million contract with the Avalanche. After attending his first training camp with Colorado, Burakovsky made his debut with the Avalanche in the opening game of the 2019–20 season against the Calgary Flames on 3 October, registering an assist. Relied to provide in an increased role from his tenure with the Capitals, Burakovsky responded by securing a role among the top six forwards, reaching the 20 goal mark for the first time in his career in placing third on the team in scoring with a career high 45 points through 58 regular season games. He collected a career-high four points (1 goal, 3 assists) in a game against the Buffalo Sabres on 4 February 2020. Missing 13 games through injury, Burakovsky returned from the COVID-19 pandemic pause in the playoffs to notch seven goals and 17 points in only 15 post-season games. He notched two points in game seven of the Western Conference semifinals, however, was unable to help Colorado past the Dallas Stars after they were defeated by the Stars in game seven in overtime for a 4–3 series defeat.

On 10 October 2020, as a restricted free agent, Burakovsky signed a two-year, $9.8 million contract extension with the Avalanche. In the pandemic-delayed 2020–21 season, Burakovsky continued in his second-line role primarily playing alongside Nazem Kadri and Brandon Saad. He made his 400th NHL appearance in a 3–2 victory over the Arizona Coyotes on 26 February 2021. He collected his 100th career goal on 10 May, against the Golden Knights and finished the regular season with the Presidents' Trophy winning Avalanche, just one goal and one point short of his previous season totals with 19 goals and 44 points through 53 games. He was unable to replicate his previous playoff form with the Avalanche in the 2021 playoffs, registering one goal and three assists for four points through ten games as the Avalanche swept the St. Louis Blues in the first round before a second-round defeat to the Golden Knights.

On 12 December 2021, Burakovsky scored his first career hat trick in a game against the Florida Panthers at Ball Arena. He finished the 2021–22 season with 22 goals and 39 points. In the 2022 playoffs, the Avalanche swept the Nashville Predators in the first round, before beating the St. Louis Blues in the second round to advance to the Western Conference Final for the first time in twenty years. Burakovsky was scratched from two games in the second-round series. They defeated the Edmonton Oilers in four games to advance to the 2022 Stanley Cup Final, the second Cup Final of Burakovsky's career, though he suffered an injury while shot-blocking that caused him to miss two games. Returning to the lineup for game one of the Finals against the two time defending Stanley Cup champion Tampa Bay Lightning, Burakovsky scored the game-winning goal in overtime on Lightning goaltender Andrei Vasilevskiy, only his second of the playoffs to that point. He scored again in a 7–0 victory in game two, but sustained a broken thumb thereafter which held him out of the lineup as the Avalanche would become Stanley Cup champions, defeating the Lightning in six games. In 12 playoff games, he tallied three goals and eight points.

=== Seattle Kraken (2022–2025) ===
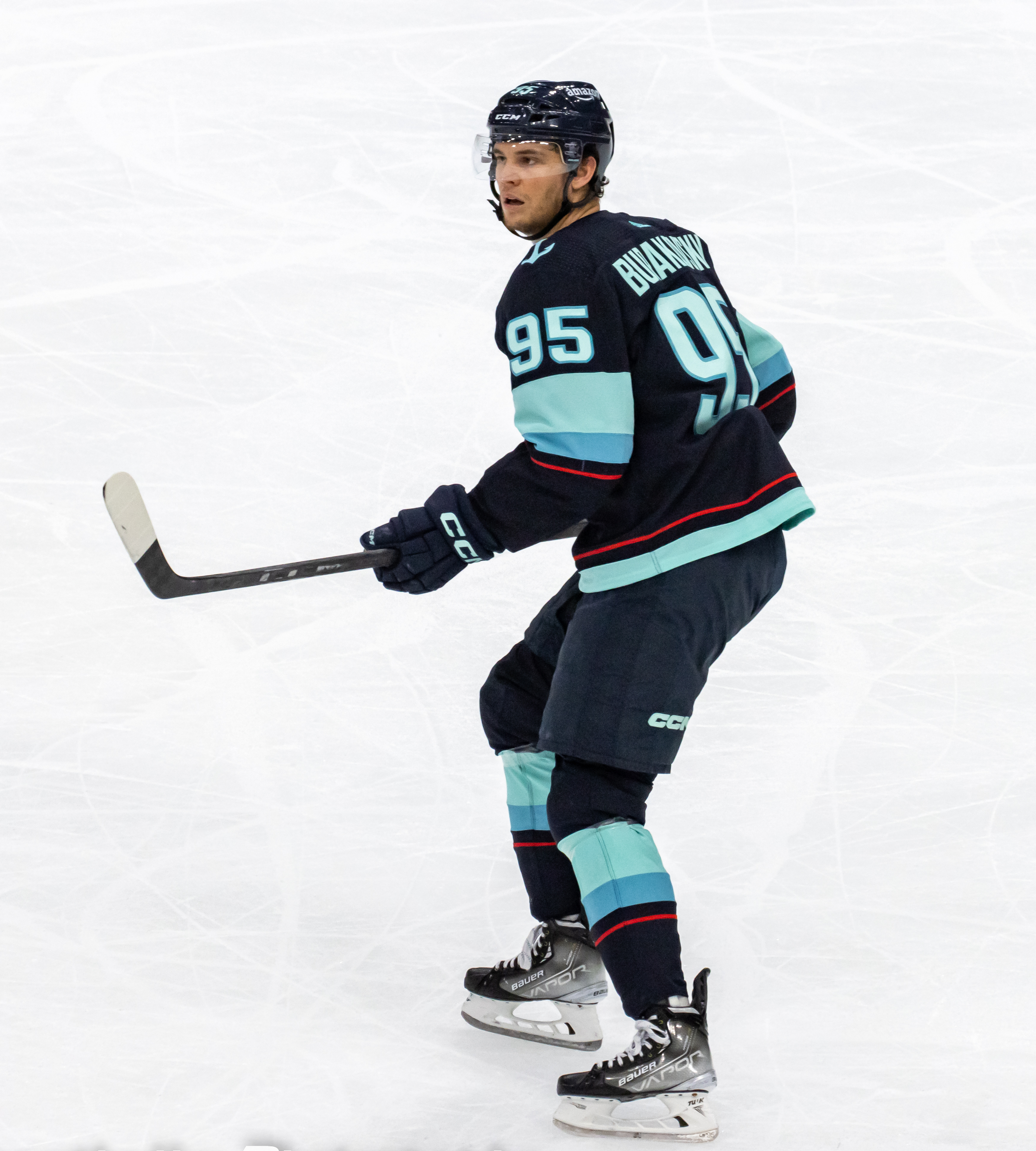
Burakovsky with the Kraken in December 2022

An unrestricted free agent following the conclusion of his contract with the Avalanche, Burakovsky signed a five-year, $27.5 million contract with the Seattle Kraken on 13 July 2022. He played the first half of the 2022–23 season before suffering a season-ending injury on 7 February 2023 against the New York Islanders. He tore his groin muscle during the game and then suffered rehabilitation setbacks resulting in the conclusion of his season. He was leading the team in scoring at the time with 13 goals and 39 points in 49 games. He returned to the Kraken roster for the 2023–24 season but only played in six games before suffering another injury, this time to his upper body. He briefly returned on 7 December before suffering another injury. He returned full-time on 29 December in a 2–1 overtime win over the Philadelphia Flyers. He finished the season having appeared 49 games, scoring seven goals and 16 points. In the 2024–25 season he struggled to begin the season, scoring only once through the team's first 25 games and ended up being scratched from the lineup. However, he rebounded in the second half and finished the season with ten goals and 37 points in 79 games.

=== Chicago Blackhawks (2025–2026) ===
At the conclusion of the 2024–25 season, Burakovsky was traded to the Chicago Blackhawks in exchange for forward Joe Veleno on 21 June 2025. Playing on star centre Connor Bedard's wing, Burakovsky started the season off well. However, after Bedard was injured and the arrival of top prospect Anton Frondell, Burakovsky's productivity declined and he began to move down the lineup, first alongside Ryan Donato and Frank Nazar and then to the fourth line towards the end of the season and then finishing as a healthy scratch. In 75 games with Chicago, he recorded 11 goals and 33 points.

=== Ottawa Senators (2026–present) ===
On 26 June 2026, after only one season with the Blackhawks, Burakovsky was sent to the Ottawa Senators in exchange for a 2027 sixth-round draft pick. Burakovsky's father Robert played for the Senators in the 1993–94 season, making the pair the second father-son duo for the Senators, after Jorian Donovan and Shean Donovan.

== International play ==
Medal record

Men's ice hockey

Representing Sweden

World Championships
Bronze medal – third place	2024 Czech Republic	

World Junior Championships
Silver medal – second place	2014 Sweden	

Burakovsky won a silver medal playing with Sweden junior team at the 2014 World Junior Championships. He scored three goals in seven games in the tournament. He joined the Sweden senior team for the 2016 World Championship in May 2016. Sweden failed to get past Canada in the quarterfinals, finishing sixth in the tournament. Burakovsky represented Sweden at the 2024 World Championship and won a bronze medal. He tallied eleven points at the tournament.

== Personal life ==
Burakovsky was born in Klagenfurt in southern Austria where his father was playing ice hockey at the time, but grew up in Malmö, Sweden, his father's hometown. His father is Robert Burakovsky, who was drafted 217th overall in the 1985 NHL entry draft and played 23 games with the Ottawa Senators in the 1993–94 season. His mother is Pernilla Burakovsky. He has two sisters, Alexandra and Anna. His cousin, Samuel Burakovsky, is a professional footballer for Landskrona BoIS in the Swedish second division. He is of Russian-Jewish descent.

== Career statistics ==
=== Regular season and playoffs ===
			Regular season					Playoffs
Season	Team	League	GP	G	A	Pts	PIM	GP	G	A	Pts	PIM
2010–11	Malmö Redhawks	J18	12	4	3	7	2	—	—	—	—	—
2010–11	Malmö Redhawks	J18 Allsv	15	4	6	10	4	—	—	—	—	—
2011–12	Malmö Redhawks	J18	9	6	8	14	14	4	2	4	6	0
2011–12	Malmö Redhawks	J20	42	17	25	42	43	5	1	4	5	2
2011–12	Malmö Redhawks	Allsv	10	0	1	1	0	3	0	0	0	0
2012–13	Malmö Redhawks	J18	1	2	2	4	0	—	—	—	—	—
2012–13	Malmö Redhawks	J18 Allsv	2	4	2	6	2	4	3	3	6	0
2012–13	Malmö Redhawks	J20	13	3	4	7	8	3	1	2	3	8
2012–13	Malmö Redhawks	Allsv	43	4	7	11	8	—	—	—	—	—
2013–14	Erie Otters	OHL	57	41	46	87	35	14	10	3	13	2
2014–15	Washington Capitals	NHL	53	9	13	22	10	11	2	1	3	0
2014–15	Hershey Bears	AHL	13	3	4	7	6	1	1	0	1	0
2015–16	Washington Capitals	NHL	79	17	21	38	12	12	1	0	1	6
2016–17	Washington Capitals	NHL	64	12	23	35	14	13	3	3	6	2
2017–18	Washington Capitals	NHL	56	12	13	25	27	13	2	4	6	4
2018–19	Washington Capitals	NHL	76	12	13	25	14	7	1	1	2	0
2019–20	Colorado Avalanche	NHL	58	20	25	45	22	15	7	10	17	4
2020–21	Colorado Avalanche	NHL	53	19	25	44	10	10	1	3	4	4
2021–22	Colorado Avalanche	NHL	80	22	39	61	18	12	3	5	8	2
2022–23	Seattle Kraken	NHL	49	13	26	39	14	—	—	—	—	—
2023–24	Seattle Kraken	NHL	49	7	9	16	14	—	—	—	—	—
2024–25	Seattle Kraken	NHL	79	10	27	37	12	—	—	—	—	—
2025–26	Chicago Blackhawks	NHL	75	11	22	33	16	—	—	—	—	—
NHL totals			771	164	256	420	183	93	20	27	47	22

=== International ===
Year	Team	Event	Result	GP	G	A	Pts	PIM
2011	Sweden	IH18	2nd place, silver medalist(s)	5	2	1	3	0
2012	Sweden	U17	4th	6	4	4	8	4
2012	Sweden	U18	2nd place, silver medalist(s)	6	0	3	3	0
2012	Sweden	IH18	3rd place, bronze medalist(s)	5	3	3	6	16
2013	Sweden	U18	5th	5	4	1	5	4
2014	Sweden	WJC	2nd place, silver medalist(s)	7	3	4	7	0
2016	Sweden	WC	6th	3	1	0	1	12
2024	Sweden	WC	3rd place, bronze medalist(s)	10	4	7	11	0
Junior totals				34	16	16	32	24
Senior totals				13	5	7	12	12

== Awards and honors ==
Award	Year	Ref
NHL
Stanley Cup champion	2018, 2022	

== See also ==
- List of select Jewish ice hockey players

Awards and achievements
Preceded by Tom Wilson	Washington Capitals first-round draft pick 2013	Succeeded by Jakub Vrána
