= Ken Spangler =

Canadian ice hockey player (born 1967)

- Born: May 2, 1967 (age 59) Edmonton, Alberta, Canada
- Height: 6 ft 0 in (183 cm)
- Weight: 200 lb (91 kg; 14 st 4 lb)
- Position: Denfenceman
- Shot: Left
- NHL draft: 22nd overall, 1985; Toronto Maple Leafs
- Playing career: 1983–1998

Ken Spangler (born May 2, 1967) is a Canadian former hockey defenceman, who spent most of his career with the Flint Generals.

== Career ==
=== Calgary Wranglers ===
Spangler started his career with the Calgary Wranglers during the 1983–84 WHL season.

=== 1985 NHL entry draft ===
On June 15, 1985, during round two of the 1985 NHL entry draft, Spangler was drafted by the Toronto Maple Leafs as the first draft pick of the second round, and the 22nd overall pick. However, Spangler never played a single minute with the Maple Leafs, and is often considered a bad draft pick. (Note: Attributed to multiple sources.)

=== Flint Spirits ===
Spangler's first stint in Flint was with the Flint Spirits of the IHL, during the 1988–89 season.

== Career statistics ==
=== Regular season and playoffs ===
			Regular season					Playoffs
Season	Team	League	GP	G	A	Pts	PIM	GP	G	A	Pts	PIM
1983–84	Calgary Wranglers	WHL	71	1	12	13	119	—	—	—	—	—
1984–85	Calgary Wranglers	WHL	71	5	30	35	251	—	—	—	—	—
1985–86	Calgary Wranglers	WHL	66	19	18	55	237	—	—	—	—	—
1986–87	Calgary Wranglers	WHL	49	12	37	36	185	—	—	—	—	—
WHL totals			257	37	102	139	792	—	—	—	—	—
