= Steve Gotaas =

Canadian ice hockey player

- Born: May 10, 1967 (age 58) Camrose, Alberta, Canada
- Height: 5 ft 10 in (178 cm)
- Weight: 180 lb (82 kg; 12 st 12 lb)
- Position: Center
- Shot: Right
- Played for: Minnesota North Stars; Pittsburgh Penguins; Klagenfurt AC; Düsseldorfer EG
- NHL draft: 86th overall, 1985; Pittsburgh Penguins
- Playing career: 1987–1994

Steven P. Gotaas (born May 10, 1967) is a Canadian former professional ice hockey player who played 49 games in the National Hockey League. He played with the Minnesota North Stars and Pittsburgh Penguins.

== Career statistics ==
			Regular Season					Playoffs
Season	Team	League	GP	G	A	Pts	PIM	GP	G	A	Pts	PIM
1983–84	Prince Albert Raiders	WHL	65	10	22	32	47	5	0	1	1	0
1984–85	Prince Albert Raiders	WHL	72	32	41	73	66	13	3	6	9	17
1985–86	Prince Albert Raiders	WHL	61	40	61	101	31	20	8	14	22	8
1986–87	Prince Albert Raiders	WHL	68	53	55	108	94	8	5	6	11	16
1987–88	Pittsburgh Penguins	NHL	36	5	6	11	45	—	—	—	—	—
1987–88	Muskegon Lumberjacks	IHL	34	16	22	38	4	—	—	—	—	—
1988–89	Kalamazoo Wings	IHL	30	24	22	46	12	5	2	3	5	2
1988–89	Minnesota North Stars	NHL	12	1	3	4	6	3	0	1	1	5
1988–89	Muskegon Lumberjacks	IHL	19	9	16	25	34	—	—	—	—	—
1989–90	Kalamazoo Wings	IHL	1	1	0	1	0	2	0	0	0	2
1990–91	Kalamazoo Wings	IHL	78	30	49	79	88	7	3	5	8	4
1990–91	Minnesota North Stars	NHL	1	0	0	0	2	—	—	—	—	—
1991–92	Kalamazoo Wings	IHL	72	34	29	63	115	12	4	10	14	20
1992–93	Klagenfurt AC	Austria	11	3	4	7	0	—	—	—	—	—
1992–93	Düsseldorfer EG	1.GBun	30	4	16	20	20	—	—	—	—	—
1993–94	Las Vegas Thunder	IHL	39	4	13	17	43	4	0	0	0	20
NHL totals			49	6	9	15	53	3	0	1	1	5
