= Glen Seabrooke =

Canadian ice hockey player (born 1967)

- Born: September 11, 1967 (age 58) Peterborough, Ontario, Canada
- Height: 6 ft 1 in (185 cm)
- Weight: 175 lb (79 kg; 12 st 7 lb)
- Position: Centre
- Shot: Left
- Played for: Philadelphia Flyers
- NHL draft: 21st overall, 1985; Philadelphia Flyers
- Playing career: 1986–1989

Glen Seabrooke (born September 11, 1967) is a Canadian former professional ice hockey player who spent parts of three seasons in the National Hockey League (NHL) in the 1980s with the Philadelphia Flyers.

== Playing career ==
As a youth, Seabrooke played in the 1980 Quebec International Pee-Wee Hockey Tournament with a minor ice hockey team from Peterborough, Ontario.

A center recognized for his abilities at both ends of the ice, Seabrooke was Philadelphia's first-round pick (21st overall) in the 1985 NHL entry draft. He made his NHL debut in 1986–87 at the age of only 19, scoring a goal and 5 points in 10 games. The following season, he was assigned to the Hershey Bears, Philadelphia's American Hockey League (AHL) affiliate, and notched 32 goals and 78 points in his first full professional season. He also played 6 more games for the Flyers, but was unable to crack a deep squad full-time.

Seabrooke found himself back in the AHL for the 1988–89 season. However, on February 22, 1989 he crashed into a goalpost and severely injured his shoulder. Reconstructive surgery that summer was unable to fix the problem, and Seabrooke's career was over at the age of only 21. He later sued team doctors for improperly rushing his rehab and causing permanent damage to his left arm, and in 1995 he was awarded a settlement of $5.5 million (US) in compensation.

He finished his NHL career with 1 goal and 7 points in just 19 games.

== Career statistics ==
			Regular season					Playoffs
Season	Team	League	GP	G	A	Pts	PIM	GP	G	A	Pts	PIM
1982–83	Peterborough Lumber Petes	MetJHL	36	9	17	26	30	—	—	—	—	—
1983–84	Peterborough Travelways AAA	Midget	29	36	31	67	31	—	—	—	—	—
1984–85	Peterborough Petes	OHL	45	21	13	34	49	16	3	5	8	4
1985–86	Peterborough Petes	OHL	19	8	12	20	33	14	9	7	16	14
1986–87	Philadelphia Flyers	NHL	10	1	4	5	2	—	—	—	—	—
1986–87	Peterborough Petes	OHL	48	30	39	69	29	4	3	3	6	6
1987–88	Philadelphia Flyers	NHL	6	0	1	1	2	—	—	—	—	—
1987–88	Hershey Bears	AHL	73	32	46	78	39	7	4	5	9	2
1988–89	Philadelphia Flyers	NHL	3	0	1	1	0	—	—	—	—	—
1988–89	Hershey Bears	AHL	51	23	15	38	19	—	—	—	—	—
NHL totals			19	1	6	7	4	—	—	—	—	—
AHL totals			124	55	61	116	58	7	4	5	9	2

Preceded by Ron Sutter	Philadelphia Flyers' first-round draft pick 1985	Succeeded by Kerry Huffman
