= Tomáš Kapusta =

Czech ice hockey player

Personal information
- Nationality: Czech
- Born: 23 February 1967 (age 59) Zlín, Czechoslovakia

Sport
- Sport: Ice hockey

Tomáš Kapusta (born 23 February 1967) is a Czech ice hockey player who competed at the 1994 Winter Olympics.

== Career ==
Kapusta was drafted 104th overall by the Edmonton Oilers in the 1985 NHL entry draft and spent three seasons in their organization playing for the Cape Breton Oilers of the American Hockey League but never played in the NHL. He also competed in the men's tournament at the 1994 Winter Olympics.
