= Stéphane Brochu =

Canadian ice hockey player

- Born: August 15, 1967 (age 58) Sherbrooke, Quebec, Canada
- Height: 6 ft 2 in (188 cm)
- Weight: 195 lb (88 kg; 13 st 13 lb)
- Position: Defence
- Shot: Left
- Played for: New York Rangers
- NHL draft: 175th overall, 1985; New York Rangers
- Playing career: 1987–2001

Stéphane Brochu (born August 15, 1967) is a Canadian former ice hockey defenceman.

== Biography ==
Brochu was born in Sherbrooke, Quebec. As a youth, he played in the 1979 and 1980 Quebec International Pee-Wee Hockey Tournaments with a minor ice hockey team from Sherbrooke.

Brochu was drafted 175th overall by the New York Rangers in the 1985 NHL entry draft from the Quebec Major Junior Hockey League's Quebec Remparts. He played three further seasons in the league for the Saint-Jean Castors before turning pro in the International Hockey League for the Colorado Rangers who later became the Denver Rangers.

During the 1988–89 season, Brochu was called up for one game for the New York Rangers. This turned out to be Brochu's only NHL game. After five games with the Flint Spirits, Brochu spent two seasons with the Fort Wayne Komets before returning to Flint in 1991 to suit up for the Flint Bulldogs of the Colonial Hockey League. He also played 3 games for the IHL's Kansas City Blades. Brochu remained in Flint and signed with the Flint Generals where he spent six seasons. During the six seasons, he had spells in the IHL for the Detroit Vipers, Chicago Wolves and the Fort Wayne Koments as well as the American Hockey League's Adirondack Red Wings. After spending the 1999–00 season with the Adirondack IceHawks, Brochu returned to the Generals for one more season before retiring.

== Career statistics ==
			Regular season					Playoffs
Season	Team	League	GP	G	A	Pts	PIM	GP	G	A	Pts	PIM
1982–83	Cantons de l'Est Cantonniers	QMAAA	4	1	1	2	0	1	0	0	0	0
1983–84	Canton de l'Est Cantonniers	QMAAA	38	7	24	31	36	15	5	10	15	28
1984–85	Quebec Remparts	QMJHL	59	2	15	17	54	4	0	2	2	2
1985–86	Saint-Jean Castors	QMJHL	63	14	27	41	121	3	1	0	1	2
1986–87	Saint-Jean Castors	QMJHL	10	0	1	1	7	8	0	2	2	11
1987–88	Saint-Jean Castors	QMJHL	29	4	35	39	88	—	—	—	—	—
1987–88	Colorado Rangers	IHL	52	4	10	14	70	12	3	3	6	13
1988–89	New York Rangers	NHL	1	0	0	0	0	—	—	—	—	—
1988–89	Denver Rangers	IHL	67	5	14	19	109	3	0	0	0	0
1989–90	Flint Spirits	IHL	5	0	0	0	2	—	—	—	—	—
1989–90	Fort Wayne Komets	IHL	63	9	19	28	98	5	0	2	2	6
1990–91	Fort Wayne Komets	IHL	73	14	29	43	49	14	1	3	4	31
1991–92	Flint Bulldogs	CoHL	52	13	27	40	80	—	—	—	—	—
1991–92	Kansas City Blades	IHL	3	0	0	0	2	—	—	—	—	—
1992–93	Flint Bulldogs	CoHL	44	6	28	34	77	6	4	8	12	22
1993–94	Flint Generals	CoHL	54	8	32	40	116	10	1	4	5	2
1994–95	Flint Generals	CoHL	60	12	37	49	39	6	0	9	9	8
1995–96	Flint Generals	CoHL	68	4	41	45	68	15	5	12	17	18
1996–97	Flint Generals	CoHL	42	8	45	53	32	14	5	20	25	14
1996–97	Detroit Vipers	IHL	1	0	0	0	2	—	—	—	—	—
1996–97	Adirondack Red Wings	AHL	18	0	8	8	12	—	—	—	—	—
1997–98	Flint Generals	UHL	54	10	62	72	52	17	2	18	20	12
1997–98	Chicago Wolves	IHL	1	0	0	0	0	—	—	—	—	—
1997–98	Detroit Vipers	IHL	3	0	0	0	2	—	—	—	—	—
1997–98	Fort Wayne Komets	IHL	2	1	0	1	0	—	—	—	—	—
1998–99	Flint Generals	UHL	58	12	55	67	39	8	1	3	4	8
1999–00	Adirondack IceHawks	UHL	55	8	34	42	41	2	0	0	0	4
2000–01	Flint Generals	UHL	17	0	8	8	14	—	—	—	—	—
NHL totals			1	0	0	0	0	—	—	—	—	—
CoHL totals			320	51	210	261	412	51	15	53	68	64

== See also ==
- List of players who played only one game in the NHL
