= Robert Burakovsky =

Swedish ice hockey player and coach

- Born: November 24, 1966 (age 59) Malmö, Sweden
- Height: 5 ft 10 in (178 cm)
- Weight: 185 lb (84 kg; 13 st 3 lb)
- Position: Right wing
- Shot: Right
- Played for: Leksands IF; AIK; Malmö IF; Ottawa Senators; EC KAC; Kassel Huskies; JYP; Ilves; HC Fribourg-Gottéron; HC Ambrì-Piotta; MIF Redhawks; DEG Metro Stars
- National team: Sweden
- NHL draft: 217th overall, 1985; New York Rangers
- Playing career: 1985–2012

Robert Burakovsky (born November 24, 1966) is a Swedish professional ice hockey coach and former player. He is the current head coach for the Malmö team in Sweden's U16 Elit league. Before turning to coaching, Burakovsky played 17 seasons of professional hockey, including 23 games in the National Hockey League (NHL) with the Ottawa Senators during the 1993–94 NHL season.

== Playing career ==
He was drafted 217th overall by the New York Rangers in the 1985 NHL entry draft. He began his career in Sweden in 1985, playing in the Elitserien for Leksands IF until 1989 when he moved to AIK and then Malmö IF. He then made the move to North America when he was signed by the Ottawa Senators, but spent the majority of his spell playing for their American Hockey League affiliate the Prince Edward Island Senators, and left after just one season.

Burakovsky moved to Austria to play for Klagenfurt AC for a season before returning to Malmö in 1995. In 1997 he moved to Germany to play in their top league, the Deutsche Eishockey Liga, and played for the Kassel Huskies. Soon after he was off to Finland to play in the SM-liiga where he played for JYP and Ilves. In 1998, he signed with Swiss team SC Herisau and had his most productive year to date, scoring 38 goals and 70 points.

He later moved to HC Fribourg-Gottéron in Nationalliga A, where he led the team in points in the 1999–00 season with 49. He returned to the Elitserien in 2000 with a second spell with Leksands and a third spell in Malmö before another brief spell in Germany with the DEG Metro Stars. In 2002, he moved to the Oddset Ligaen in Denmark where he spent two seasons with Rødovre IK and then moved to Serie A in Italy, playing for HC Merano. His stay in Italy was a brief one however as he returned to Denmark in 2004 with Aalborg IK for two seasons, followed by a spell with the Herlev Hornets. He currently plays for EHC Biel in the Swiss second-tier Nationalliga B having moved from IK Pantern in Sweden's third tier during the 2007–08 season. During the late winter season 2009, he joined the team KRIF (Kallinge Ronneby IF). In 2012 Burakovsky retired from hockey.

== Personal life ==
Burakovsky is Jewish, and his father, Benny, was an ice hockey coach. Robert's brother Mikael was also a professional ice hockey player, and Robert's son, André, was selected 23rd overall by the Washington Capitals in the 2013 NHL entry draft.

== Career statistics ==
=== Regular season and playoffs ===
			Regular season					Playoffs
Season	Team	League	GP	G	A	Pts	PIM	GP	G	A	Pts	PIM
1985–86	Leksands IF	SEL	19	4	3	7	4	—	—	—	—	—
1986–87	Leksands IF	SEL	36	21	15	36	26	—	—	—	—	—
1987–88	Leksands IF	SEL	36	10	11	21	10	1	0	0	0	2
1988–89	Leksands IF	SEL	40	23	20	43	44	10	6	7	13	4
1989–90	AIK	SEL	37	28	29	57	32	3	0	2	2	12
1990–91	AIK	SEL	30	8	15	23	26	—	—	—	—	—
1991–92	Malmö IF	SEL	40	19	22	41	42	9	5	0	5	4
1992–93	Malmö IF	SEL	32	8	10	18	40	6	4	4	8	9
1993–94	Ottawa Senators	NHL	23	2	3	5	6	—	—	—	—	—
1993–94	PEI Senators	AHL	52	29	38	67	28	—	—	—	—	—
1994–95	EC KAC	AUT	28	28	36	64	40	3	2	2	4	2
1995–96	Malmö IF	SEL	40	23	21	44	34	5	2	1	3	6
1996–97	Malmö IF	SEL	33	19	17	36	44	—	—	—	—	—
1996–97	Kassel Huskies	DEL	11	5	7	12	4	10	4	6	10	6
1997–98	Kassel Huskies	DEL	17	7	6	13	0	—	—	—	—	—
1997–98	JYP	SM-l	14	14	7	21	16	—	—	—	—	—
1997–98	Ilves	SM-l	11	5	4	9	40	9	7	3	10	0
1998–99	HC Fribourg–Gottéron	NDA	5	4	2	6	4	—	—	—	—	—
1998–99	SC Herisau	SUI.2	35	38	32	70	10	—	—	—	—	—
1999–2000	HC Fribourg–Gottéron	NLA	45	16	33	49	49	—	—	—	—	—
1999–2000	HC Ambrì–Piotta	NLA	1	0	0	0	0	—	—	—	—	—
2000–01	Leksands IF	SEL	50	17	27	44	78	9	4	4	8	4
2001–02	MIF Redhawks	SEL	37	4	17	21	2	5	2	2	4	0
2001–02	DEG Metro Stars	DEL	12	3	4	7	10	—	—	—	—	—
NHL totals			23	2	3	5	6	—	—	—	—	—
SEL totals			430	184	207	391	382	48	23	20	43	41

=== International ===
Year	Team	Event	GP	G	A	Pts	PIM
1986	Sweden	WJC	7	1	1	2	0
Junior totals			7	1	1	2	0

== Awards and honors ==
Award	Year
NLB
Switz NLB Player of the Year	1998–99

== See also ==
- List of select Jewish ice hockey players
