= Curtis Hunt =

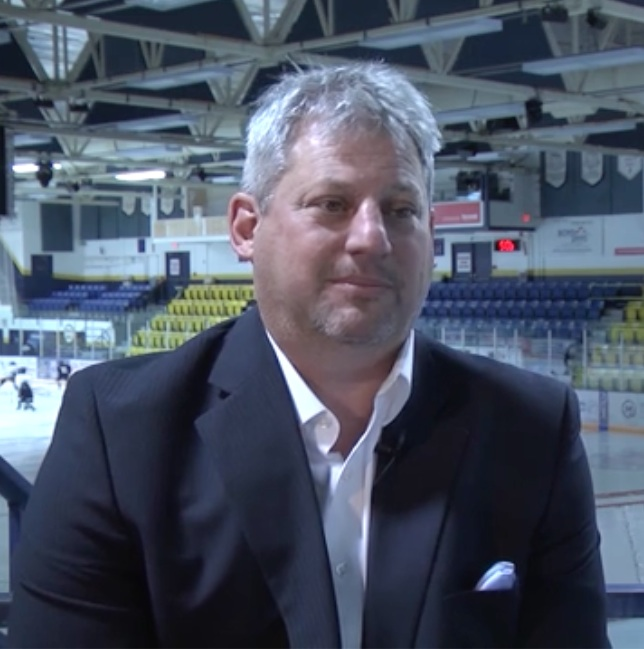
- Born: January 28, 1967 (age 59) North Battleford, Saskatchewan, Canada
- Height: 6 ft 2 in (188 cm)
- Weight: 205 lb (93 kg; 14 st 9 lb)
- Position: Defence
- Played for: Fredericton Express; Flint Spirits; Milwaukee Admirals; Albany Choppers; St. John's Maple Leafs; Houston Aeros; Michigan K-Wings; Prince Albert Raiders
- NHL draft: 172nd overall, 1985; Vancouver Canucks
- Playing career: 1987–1996

Curtis Hunt (born January 28, 1967) is a Canadian former professional ice hockey player who currently serves as the general manager for the Prince Albert Raiders of the Western Hockey League (WHL).

== Playing career ==
Hunt played junior hockey for the Prince Albert Raiders in the WHL, winning a Memorial Cup in 1985. He was drafted by the Vancouver Canucks in the 1985 NHL entry draft, but never played in the NHL. Hunt played in the American Hockey League for the Fredericton Express and St. John's Maple Leafs. He also played in the International Hockey League (IHL) and the East Coast Hockey League.

== Coaching career ==
Hunt started his coaching career in the IHL as an assistant coach with the Grand Rapids Griffins. He then moved to the WHL, serving as head coach for the Moose Jaw Warriors and Regina Pats. After the 2003–04 season with the Warriors, Hunt was the runner-up for WHL Coach of the Year. Hunt made the jump to the National Hockey League coaching ranks, serving as an assistant coach for the Ottawa Senators during the 2008–09 season. After head coach Craig Hartsburg was fired, Hunt was demoted to coach the Binghamton Senators of the AHL. Hunt rejoined the Pats starting with the 2009–10 season.

Hunt has coached internationally for Canada at the junior level. He served as an assistant coach on Canada's gold medal winning teams at the World Junior Ice Hockey Championships in 2006 and 2007.

During the 2014–15 season, Hunt was named the General Manager and Head coach for the Fort McMurray Oil Barons as a replacement for Gord Thibodeau. He resigned the following season after making multiple trades that left the Oil Barons organization scrambling to rebuild their roster in order to put a competitive team on the ice. He joined the Prince Albert Raiders shortly after his resignation. His new role as general manager was announced on June 8, 2015.

== Career statistics ==
			Regular season					Playoffs
Season	Team	League	GP	G	A	Pts	PIM	GP	G	A	Pts	PIM
1984–85	Prince Albert Raiders	WHL	64	2	13	15	61	13	0	3	3	24
1985–86	Prince Albert Raiders	WHL	72	5	29	34	108	18	2	8	10	28
1986–87	Prince Albert Raiders	WHL	47	6	31	37	101	8	1	3	4	4
1987–88	Fredericton Express	AHL	1	0	0	0	2	—	—	—	—	—
1987–88	Flint Spirits	IHL	76	4	17	21	181	2	0	0	0	16
1988–89	Milwaukee Admirals	IHL	65	3	17	20	226	11	1	2	3	43
1989–90	Milwaukee Admirals	IHL	69	8	25	33	237	3	0	1	1	4
1990–91	Albany Choppers	IHL	45	2	12	14	122	—	—	—	—	—
1990–91	Milwaukee Admirals	IHL	27	1	5	6	85	6	0	1	1	10
1991–92	St. John's Maple Leafs	AHL	52	5	18	23	106	12	1	5	6	36
1992–93	St. John's Maple Leafs	AHL	48	4	19	23	148	7	0	3	3	6
1993–94	St. John's Maple Leafs	AHL	72	3	13	16	175	6	0	0	0	16
1994–95	Houston Aeros	IHL	44	0	12	12	103	3	0	0	0	12
1995–96	Houston Aeros	IHL	20	1	3	4	48	—	—	—	—	—
1995–96	Michigan K-Wings	IHL	8	0	1	1	6	—	—	—	—	—
AHL totals			173	12	50	62	431	25	1	8	9	58
IHL totals			354	19	92	111	1,008	25	1	4	5	85
