= Jonas Heed =

Swedish ice hockey player

- Born: January 3, 1967 (age 59) Västerås, Sweden
- Height: 6 ft 1 in (185 cm)
- Weight: 190 lb (86 kg; 13 st 8 lb)
- Position: Defence
- Shot: Left
- Played for: SEL; Södertälje SK; Frölunda HC
- NHL draft: 116th overall, 1985; Chicago Blackhawks
- Playing career: 1984–2009

Jonas Heed (born January 3, 1967) is a Swedish former professional ice hockey player. He was selected by the Chicago Blackhawks in the 6th round (116th overall) of the 1985 NHL entry draft.

Between 1984 and 1998, Heed played 316 regular season games in the Swedish Elitserien.

== Personal information ==
His son, Tim Heed, who also plays defence, was drafted by the Anaheim Ducks in the 5th round of the 2010 NHL entry draft.

== Career statistics ==
			Regular season					Playoffs
Season	Team	League	GP	G	A	Pts	PIM	GP	G	A	Pts	PIM
1982–83	Södertälje SK U16	U16 SM	—	—	—	—	—	—	—	—	—	—
1983–84	Södertälje SK J18	J18 Elit	—	—	—	—	—	—	—	—	—	—
1983–84	Södertälje SK J20	Juniorserien	—	—	—	—	—	—	—	—	—	—
1984–85	Södertälje SK J18	J18 Elit	—	—	—	—	—	—	—	—	—	—
1984–85	Södertälje SK J20	Juniorserien	—	—	—	—	—	—	—	—	—	—
1984–85	Södertälje SK	Elitserien	8	0	0	0	0	—	—	—	—	—
1985–86	Södertälje SK J20	Juniorserien	—	—	—	—	—	—	—	—	—	—
1985–86	Södertälje SK	Elitserien	17	3	2	5	6	—	—	—	—	—
1986–87	Södertälje SK J20	Juniorserien	—	—	—	—	—	—	—	—	—	—
1986–87	Södertälje SK	Elitserien	24	0	3	3	12	—	—	—	—	—
1987–88	Södertälje SK	Elitserien	26	1	4	5	12	2	0	0	0	4
1988–89	Södertälje SK	Elitserien	38	4	9	13	22	5	0	0	0	6
1989–90	Södertälje SK	Elitserien	36	7	4	11	30	2	0	0	0	0
1990–91	Västra Frölunda HC	Elitserien	21	1	1	2	14	—	—	—	—	—
1991–92	Västra Frölunda HC	Elitserien	33	2	1	3	34	3	0	0	0	0
1992–93	Västra Frölunda HC	Elitserien	21	2	2	4	34	—	—	—	—	—
1993–94	Västra Frölunda HC	Elitserien	21	6	1	7	32	4	0	0	0	18
1993–94	Hanhals HF	Division 1	12	4	2	6	24	—	—	—	—	—
1994–95	Södertälje SK	Division 1	27	8	7	15	56	3	1	1	2	2
1995–96	Södertälje SK	Division 1	35	6	15	21	48	4	0	0	0	14
1996–97	Södertälje SK	Elitserien	41	3	3	6	48	—	—	—	—	—
1997–98	Södertälje SK	Elitserien	30	2	2	4	60	—	—	—	—	—
1998–99	Södertälje SK	Elitserien	34	7	6	13	81	—	—	—	—	—
2006–07	Åkers IF	Division 3	4	0	3	3	22	—	—	—	—	—
2008–09	Telge Black Knights	Division 3	1	1	1	2	2	—	—	—	—	—
Elitserien totals			316	31	32	63	304	16	0	0	0	28
