= 1985 NHL entry draft =

1985 ice hockey draft

General information
- Date: June 15, 1985
- Location: Metro Toronto Convention Centre; Toronto, Ontario, Canada

Overview
- 252 total selections in 12 rounds
- First selection: (Canada) Wendel Clark (Toronto Maple Leafs)
- Hall of Famers: 2: C Joe Nieuwendyk; C Igor Larionov

The 1985 NHL entry draft was the 23rd draft for the National Hockey League. It was the first draft outside Montreal. The event was held at the Metro Toronto Convention Centre in Toronto, and attended by 7,000 fans. The NHL teams selected 252 players eligible for entry into professional ranks, in the reverse order of the 1984–85 NHL season and playoff standings.

Toronto hosted and made the first overall pick; this coincidence would not occur again until Montreal hosted and drafted first in 2022.

The last active players in the NHL from this draft class were Sean Burke and Joe Nieuwendyk, who both played their last NHL games in the 2006–07 season.

== Selections by round ==
Below are listed the selections in the 1985 NHL entry draft.

= NHL All-Star team ·	= NHL All-Star (Note: Players are identified as an All-Star if they were selected for the All-Star game at any time in their career.) ·	= NHL All-Star and NHL All-Star team ·	= Hall of Famers

Club teams are located in North America unless otherwise noted.

=== Round one ===
#	Player	Nationality	NHL team	College/junior/club team
1	Wendel Clark (D)	Canada	Toronto Maple Leafs	Saskatoon Blades (WHL)
2	Craig Simpson (LW)	Canada	Pittsburgh Penguins	Michigan State University (CCHA)
3	Craig Wolanin (D)	United States	New Jersey Devils	Kitchener Rangers (OHL)
4	Jim Sandlak (RW)	Canada	Vancouver Canucks	London Knights (OHL)
5	Dana Murzyn (D)	Canada	Hartford Whalers	Calgary Wranglers (WHL)
6	Brad Dalgarno (RW)	Canada	New York Islanders (from Minnesota)^{1}	Hamilton Steelhawks (OHL)
7	Ulf Dahlen (RW)	Sweden	New York Rangers	Ostersunds IK (Sweden)
8	Brent Fedyk (RW)	Canada	Detroit Red Wings	Regina Pats (WHL)
9	Craig Duncanson (LW)	Canada	Los Angeles Kings	Sudbury Wolves (OHL)
10	Dan Gratton (C)	Canada	Los Angeles Kings (from Boston)^{2}	Oshawa Generals (OHL)
11	Dave Manson (D)	Canada	Chicago Black Hawks	Prince Albert Raiders (WHL)
12	Jose Charbonneau (RW)	Canada	Montreal Canadiens (from St. Louis)^{3}	Drummondville Voltigeurs (QMJHL)
13	Derek King (LW)	Canada	New York Islanders	Sault Ste. Marie Greyhounds (OHL)
14	Calle Johansson (D)	Sweden	Buffalo Sabres	Vastra Frolunda HC (Sweden)
15	David Latta (LW)	Canada	Quebec Nordiques	Kitchener Rangers (OHL)
16	Tom Chorske (LW)	United States	Montreal Canadiens	Minneapolis Southwest High School (USHS–MN)
17	Chris Biotti (D)	United States	Calgary Flames	Belmont Hill School (USHS–MA)
18	Ryan Stewart (C)	Canada	Winnipeg Jets	Kamloops Blazers (WHL)
19	Yvon Corriveau (LW)	Canada	Washington Capitals	Toronto Marlboros (OHL)
20	Scott Metcalfe (C)	Canada	Edmonton Oilers	Kingston Canadians (OHL)
21	Glen Seabrooke (C)	Canada	Philadelphia Flyers	Peterborough Petes (OHL)
^{Reference: "1985 NHL Entry Draft Picks at hockeydb.com". Archived from the original on February 20, 2009.}

1. The Minnesota North Stars' first-round pick went to the New York Islanders as the result of a trade on November 19, 1984 that sent Roland Melanson to Minnesota in exchange for an optional 1st-rd pick in 1985 NHL Entry Draft (this pick) or 1986 NHL entry draft.
2. The Boston Bruins' first-round pick went to the Los Angeles Kings as the result of a trade on October 24, 1984 that sent Charlie Simmer to Boston in exchange for this pick.
3. The St. Louis Blues' first-round pick went to the Montreal Canadiens as the result of a trade on June 15, 1985 that sent Mike Dark, Mark Hunter, Montreal's second-round, third-round, fifth-round and sixth-round picks in 1985 NHL Entry Draft to St. Louis in exchange for St. Louis' second-round, fourth-round, fifth-round and sixth-round picks in 1985 NHL Entry Draft and this pick.

=== Round two ===
#	Player	Nationality	NHL team	College/junior/club team
22	Ken Spangler (D)	Canada	Toronto Maple Leafs	Calgary Wranglers (WHL)
23	Lee Giffin (RW)	Canada	Pittsburgh Penguins	Oshawa Generals (OHL)
24	Sean Burke (G)	Canada	New Jersey Devils	Toronto Marlboros (OHL)
25	Troy Gamble (G)	Canada	Vancouver Canucks	Medicine Hat Tigers (WHL)
26	Kay Whitmore (G)	Canada	Hartford Whalers	Peterborough Petes (OHL)
27	Joe Nieuwendyk (C)	Canada	Calgary Flames (from Minnesota)^{1}	Cornell University (ECAC)
28	Mike Richter (G)	United States	New York Rangers	Northwood School (USHS–NY)
29	Jeff Sharples (D)	Canada	Detroit Red Wings	Kelowna Wings (WHL)
30	Par Edlund (LW)	Sweden	Los Angeles Kings	IF Bjorkloven (Sweden)
31	Alain Cote (D)	Canada	Boston Bruins	Quebec Remparts (QMJHL)
32	Eric Weinrich (D)	United States	New Jersey Devils (from Chicago)^{2}	North Yarmouth Academy (USHS–ME)
33	Todd Richards (D)	United States	Montreal Canadiens (from St. Louis)^{3}	Plymouth Armstrong High School (USHS–MN)
34	Brad Lauer (LW)	Canada	New York Islanders	Regina Pats (WHL)
35	Benoit Hogue (LW)	Canada	Buffalo Sabres	Saint-Jean Castors (QMJHL)
36	Jason Lafreniere (C)	Canada	Quebec Nordiques	Hamilton Steelhawks (OHL)
37	Herb Raglan (RW)	Canada	St. Louis Blues (from Montreal)^{4}	Kingston Canadians (OHL)
38	Jeff Wenaas (C)	Canada	Calgary Flames	Medicine Hat Tigers (WHL)
39	Roger Ohman (D)	Sweden	Winnipeg Jets	Leksands IF (Sweden)
40	John Druce (RW)	Canada	Washington Capitals	Peterborough Petes (OHL)
41	Todd Carnelley (D)	Canada	Edmonton Oilers	Kamloops Blazers (WHL)
42	Bruce Rendall (LW)	Canada	Philadelphia Flyers	Chatham Maroons (OPJHL)
^{Reference:}

1. The Minnesota North Stars' second-round pick went to the Calgary Flames as the result of a trade on June 15, 1985 that sent Kent Nilsson and an optional third-round picks in 1986 NHL entry draft or 1987 NHL entry draft to Calgary in exchange for Minnesota' second-round pick in 1987 NHL entry draft and this pick.
2. The Chicago Black Hawks' second-round pick went to the New Jersey Devils as the result of a trade on June 19, 1984 that sent Bob MacMillan and New Jersey's fifth-round picks in 1985 NHL Entry Draft to Chicago in exchange for Don Dietrich, Rich Preston and this pick.
3. The St. Louis Blues' second-round pick went to the Montreal Canadiens as the result of a trade on June 15, 1985 that sent Mike Dark, Mark Hunter, Montreal's second-round, third-round, fifth-round and sixth-round picks in 1985 NHL Entry Draft to St. Louis in exchange for St. Louis' first-round, fourth-round, fifth-round and sixth-round picks in 1985 NHL Entry Draft and this pick.
4. The Montreal Canadiens' second-round pick went to the St. Louis Blues as the result of a trade on June 15, 1985 that sent St. Louis' first-round, second-round, fourth-round, fifth-round and sixth-round picks in 1985 NHL Entry Draft to Montreal in exchange for Mike Dark, Mark Hunter, Montreal's third-round, fifth-round, sixth-round picks in 1985 NHL Entry Draft and this pick.

=== Round three ===
#	Player	Nationality	NHL team	College/junior/club team
43	Dave Tomlinson (LW)	Canada	Toronto Maple Leafs	Brandon Wheat Kings (WHL)
44	Nelson Emerson (RW)	Canada	St. Louis Blues (from Pittsburgh via Montreal)^{1}	Stratford Cullitons (OPJHL)
45	Myles O'Connor (D)	Canada	New Jersey Devils	Notre Dame Hounds (SJHL)
46	Shane Doyle (D)	Canada	Vancouver Canucks	Belleville Bulls (OHL)
47	Rocky Dundas (RW)	Canada	Montreal Canadiens (from Hartford)^{2}	Kelowna Wings (WHL)
48	Darryl Gilmour (G)	Canada	Philadelphia Flyers (from Minnesota)^{3}	Moose Jaw Warriors (WHL)
49	Sam Lindstahl (G)	Sweden	New York Rangers	Sodertalje SK (Sweden)
50	Steve Chiasson (D)	Canada	Detroit Red Wings	Guelph Platers (OHL)
51	Stephane Roy (C)	Canada	Minnesota North Stars (from Los Angeles)^{4}	Granby Bisons (QMJHL)
52	Bill Ranford (G)	Canada	Boston Bruins	New Westminster Bruins (WHL)
53	Andy Helmuth (G)	Canada	Chicago Black Hawks	Ottawa 67's (OHL)
54	Ned Desmond (D)	United States	St. Louis Blues	Hotchkiss School (USHS–CT)
55	Jeff Finley (D)	Canada	New York Islanders	Portland Winter Hawks (WHL)
56	Keith Gretzky (F)	Canada	Buffalo Sabres	Windsor Spitfires (OHL)
57	Max Middendorf (C)	Canada	Quebec Nordiques	Sudbury Wolves (OHL)
58	Bruce Racine (G)	Canada	Pittsburgh Penguins (from Montreal via Hartford)^{5}	Northeastern University (Hockey East)
59	Lane MacDonald (LW)	United States	Calgary Flames	Harvard University (ECAC)
60	Daniel Berthiaume (G)	Canada	Winnipeg Jets	Chicoutimi Sagueneens (QMJHL)
61	Rob Murray (C)	Canada	Washington Capitals	Peterborough Petes (OHL)
62	Mike Ware (RW)	Canada	Edmonton Oilers	Hamilton Steelhawks (OHL)
63	Shane Whelan (C)	Canada	Philadelphia Flyers	Oshawa Generals (OHL)
^{Reference:}

1. The Montreal Canadiens' third-round pick went to the St. Louis Blues as the result of a trade on June 15, 1985 that sent St. Louis' first-round, second-round, fourth-round, fifth-round and sixth-round picks in 1985 NHL Entry Draft to Montreal in exchange for Mike Dark, Mark Hunter, Montreal's second-round, fifth-round, sixth-round picks in 1985 NHL Entry Draft and this pick.
  Montreal previously acquired this pick as the result of a trade on September 15, 1982 that sent that sent Denis Herron to Pittsburgh in exchange for this pick.
2. The Hartford Whalers' third-round pick went to the Montreal Canadiens as the result of a trade on December 21, 1981 that sent Pierre Larouche, Montreal's first-round pick in 1984 NHL entry draft and third-round pick in 1985 NHL Entry Draft to Hartford in exchange for Hartford's first-round and second-round pick in 1984 NHL Entry Draft along with this pick.
3. The Minnesota North Stars' third-round pick went to the Philadelphia Flyers as the result of a trade on February 23, 1984 that sent Paul Holmgren to Minnesota in exchange for the rights to Paul Guay and this pick.
4. The Los Angeles Kings' third-round pick went to the Minnesota North Stars as the result of a trade on February 1, 1983 that sent Markus Mattsson to Los Angeles in exchange for this pick.
5. The Hartford Whalers' third-round pick went to the Pittsburgh Penguins as the result of a trade on September 30, 1983 that sent Greg Malone to Hartford in exchange for this pick.
  Hartford previously acquired this pick as the result of a trade on December 21, 1981 that sent that sent Hartford's first-round and second-round picks in 1984 NHL entry draft with a third-round pick in 1985 NHL Entry Draft to Montreal in exchange for Pierre Larouche, Montreal's first-round pick in 1984 NHL entry draft and this pick.

=== Round four ===
#	Player	Nationality	NHL team	College/junior/club team
64	Greg Vey (LW)	Canada	Toronto Maple Leafs	Peterborough Petes (OHL)
65	Peter Massey (LW)	United States	Quebec Nordiques (from Pittsburgh via Boston)^{1}	New Hampton School (USHS–NH))
66	Greg Polak (LW)	United States	New Jersey Devils	Lincoln High School (USHS–MN)
67	Randy Siska (C)	Canada	Vancouver Canucks	Medicine Hat Tigers (WHL)
68	Gary Callaghan (C)	Canada	Hartford Whalers	Belleville Bulls (OHL)
69	Mike Berger (D)	Canada	Minnesota North Stars	Lethbridge Broncos (WHL)
70	Pat Janostin (D)	Canada	New York Rangers	Notre Dame Hounds (SJHL)
71	Mark Gowans (G)	United States	Detroit Red Wings	Windsor Compuware Spitfires (OHL)
72	Perry Florio (D)	United States	Los Angeles Kings	Kent School (USHS–CT)
73	Jamie Kelly (RW)	United States	Boston Bruins	Scituate High School (USHS–MA)
74	Dan Vincelette (LW)	Canada	Chicago Black Hawks	Drummondville Voltigeurs (QMJHL)
75	Martin Desjardins (C)	Canada	Montreal Canadiens (from St. Louis)^{2}	Trois-Rivieres Draveurs (QMJHL)
76	Kevin Herom (LW)	Canada	New York Islanders	Moose Jaw Warriors (WHL)
77	Dave Moylan (D)	Canada	Buffalo Sabres	Sudbury Wolves (OHL)
78	David Espe (D)	United States	Quebec Nordiques	White Bear Lake Area High School (USHS–MN)
79	Brent Gilchrist (C)	Canada	Montreal Canadiens	Kelowna Wings (WHL)
80	Roger Johansson (D)	Sweden	Calgary Flames	Troja (Sweden)
81	Fredrik Olausson (D)	Sweden	Winnipeg Jets	Farjestad BK (Sweden)
82	Bill Houlder (D)	Canada	Washington Capitals	North Bay Centennials (OHL)
83	Larry Shaw (D)	Canada	Washington Capitals (from Edmonton)^{3}	Peterborough Petes (OHL)
84	Paul Marshall (D)	United States	Philadelphia Flyers	Quincy High School (USHS–NY)
^{Reference:}

1. The Boston Bruins' fourth-round pick went to the Quebec Nordiques as the result of a trade on October 25, 1984 that sent Louis Sleigher to Boston in exchange for Luc Dufour and this pick.
  Boston previously acquired this pick as the result of a trade on October 15, 1984 that sent that sent Randy Hillier to Pittsburgh in exchange for this pick.
2. The St. Louis Blues' fourth-round pick went to the Montreal Canadiens as the result of a trade on June 15, 1985 that sent Mike Dark, Mark Hunter, Montreal's second-round, third-round, fifth-round and sixth-round picks in 1985 NHL Entry Draft to St. Louis in exchange for St. Louis' first-round, second-round, fifth-round and sixth-round picks in 1985 NHL Entry Draft and this pick.
3. The Edmonton Oilers' fourth-round pick went to the Washington Capitals as the result of a trade on March 6, 1984 that sent the rights to Risto Jalo to Edmonton in exchange for this pick.

=== Round five ===
#	Player	Nationality	NHL team	College/junior/club team
85	Jeff Serowik (D)	United States	Toronto Maple Leafs	Lawrence Academy (USHS–MA)
86	Steve Gotaas (C)	Canada	Pittsburgh Penguins	Prince Albert Raiders (WHL)
87	Rick Herbert (D)	Canada	Chicago Black Hawks (from New Jersey)^{1}	Portland Winter Hawks (WHL)
88	Robert Kron (C)	Czechoslovakia	Vancouver Canucks	Zetor Brno (Czechoslovakia)
89	Tommy Hedlund (D)	Sweden	New York Islanders (from Hartford)^{2}	AIK IF (Sweden)
90	Dwight Mullins (RW)	Canada	Minnesota North Stars	Lethbridge Broncos (WHL)
91	Brad Stepan (LW)	Canada	New York Rangers	Hastings High School (USHS–MN)
92	Chris Luongo (D)	United States	Detroit Red Wings	St. Clair Shores Falcons (NAHL)
93	Petr Prajsler (D)	Czechoslovakia	Los Angeles Kings	LTC Pardubice (Czechoslovakia)
94	Steve Moore (D)	Canada	Boston Bruins	London Diamonds (OPJHL)
95	Brad Belland (C)	Canada	Chicago Black Hawks	Sudbury Wolves (OHL)
96	Tom Sagissor (C)	United States	Montreal Canadiens (from St. Louis)^{3}	Hastings High School (USHS–MN)
97	Jeff Sveen (RW/C)	Canada	New York Islanders	Boston University (Hockey East)
98	Ken Priestlay (C)	Canada	Buffalo Sabres	Victoria Cougars (WHL)
99	Bruce Major (C)	Canada	Quebec Nordiques	Richmond Sockeyes (BCJHL)
100	Dan Brooks (D)	United States	St. Louis Blues (from Montreal)^{4}	Saint Thomas Academy (USHS–MN)
101	Esa Keskinen (C)	Finland	Calgary Flames	TPS (Finland)
102	John Borrell (RW)	United States	Winnipeg Jets	Burnsville High School (USHS–MN)
103	Claude Dumas (C)	Canada	Washington Capitals	Granby Bisons (QMJHL)
104	Tomas Kapusta (C)	Czechoslovakia	Edmonton Oilers	TJ Gottwaldov (Czechoslovakia)
105	Daril Holmes (RW)	Canada	Philadelphia Flyers	Kingston Canadians (OHL)
^{Reference:}

1. The New Jersey Devils' fifth-round pick went to the Chicago Black Hawks as the result of a trade on June 19, 1984 that sent Don Dietrich, Rich Preston and Chicago's second-round picks in 1985 NHL Entry Draft to New Jersey in exchange for Bob MacMillan and this pick.
2. The Hartford Whalers' fifth-round pick went to the New York Islanders as the result of a trade on August 19, 1983 that sent Steve Stoyanovich to Hartford in exchange for this pick.
3. The St. Louis Blues'fifth-round pick went to the Montreal Canadiens as the result of a trade on June 15, 1985 that sent Mike Dark, Mark Hunter, Montreal's second-round, third-round, fifth-round and sixth-round picks in 1985 NHL Entry Draft to St. Louis in exchange for St. Louis' first-round, second-round, fourth-round and sixth-round picks in 1985 NHL Entry Draft and this pick.
4. The Montreal Canadiens' fifth-round pick went to the St. Louis Blues as the result of a trade on June 15, 1985 that sent St. Louis' first-round, second-round, fourth-round, fifth-round and sixth-round picks in 1985 NHL Entry Draft to Montreal in exchange for Mike Dark, Mark Hunter, Montreal's second-round, third-round, sixth-round picks in 1985 NHL Entry Draft and this pick.

=== Round six ===
#	Player	Nationality	NHL team	College/junior/club team
106	Jiri Latal (D)	Czechoslovakia	Toronto Maple Leafs	Dukla Trencin (Czechoslovakia)
107	Kevin Clemens (LW)	Canada	Pittsburgh Penguins	Regina Pats (WHL)
108	Bill McMillan (RW)	Canada	New Jersey Devils	Peterborough Petes (OHL)
109	Martin Hrstka (LW)	Czechoslovakia	Vancouver Canucks	Dukla Trencin (Czechoslovakia)
110	Shane Churla (RW)	Canada	Hartford Whalers	Medicine Hat Tigers (WHL)
111	Mike Mullowney (D)	United States	Minnesota North Stars	Deerfield Academy (USHS–MA)
112	Brian McReynolds (C)	Canada	New York Rangers	Orillia Travelways (OPJHL)
113	Randy McKay (RW)	Canada	Detroit Red Wings	Michigan Technological University (WCHA)
114	Stuart-Lee Marston (D)	Canada	Pittsburgh Penguins (from Los Angeles)^{1}	Longueuil Chevaliers (QMJHL)
115	Gord Hynes (D)	Canada	Boston Bruins	Medicine Hat Tigers (WHL)
116	Jonas Heed (D)	Sweden	Chicago Black Hawks	Sodertalje SK (Sweden)
117	Donald Dufresne (D)	Canada	Montreal Canadiens (from St. Louis)^{2}	Trois-Rivieres Draveurs (QMJHL)
118	Rod Dallman (LW)	Canada	New York Islanders	Prince Albert Raiders (WHL)
119	Joe Reekie (D)	Canada	Buffalo Sabres	Cornwall Royals (OHL)
120	Andy Akervik (C)	United States	Quebec Nordiques	Eau Claire Memorial High School (USHS–WI)
121	Rick Burchill (G)	United States	St. Louis Blues (from Montreal)^{3}	Catholic Memorial School (USHS–MA)
122	Tim Sweeney (LW)	United States	Calgary Flames	Weymouth High School (USHS–MA), Madison Capitols (USHL)
123	Danton Cole (RW)	United States	Winnipeg Jets	Aurora Tigers (OPJHL)
124	Doug Stromback (RW)	Canada	Washington Capitals	Kitchener Rangers (OHL)
125	Brian Tessier (G)	Canada	Edmonton Oilers	North Bay Centennials (OHL)
126	Ken Alexander (D)	Canada	Philadelphia Flyers	Kitchener Rangers (OHL)
^{Reference:}

1. The Los Angeles Kings' sixth-round pick went to the Pittsburgh Penguins as the result of a trade on October 15, 1983 that sent Marc Chorney to Los Angeles in exchange for this pick.
2. The St. Louis Blues'sixth-round pick went to the Montreal Canadiens as the result of a trade on June 15, 1985 that sent Mike Dark, Mark Hunter, Montreal's second-round, third-round, fifth-round and sixth-round picks in 1985 NHL Entry Draft to St. Louis in exchange for St. Louis' first-round, second-round, fourth-round and fifth-round picks in 1985 NHL Entry Draft and this pick.
3. The Montreal Canadiens' sixth-round pick went to the St. Louis Blues as the result of a trade on June 15, 1985 that sent St. Louis' first-round, second-round, fourth-round, fifth-round and sixth-round picks in 1985 NHL Entry Draft to Montreal in exchange for Mike Dark, Mark Hunter, Montreal's second-round, third-round, fifth-round picks in 1985 NHL Entry Draft and this pick.

=== Round seven ===
#	Player	Nationality	NHL team	College/junior/club team
127	Tim Bean (LW)	Canada	Toronto Maple Leafs	North Bay Centennials (OHL)
128	Steve Titus (G)	Canada	Pittsburgh Penguins	Cornwall Royals (OHL)
129	Kevin Schrader (D)	United States	New Jersey Devils	Burnsville High School (USHS–MN)
130	Brian McFarlane (RW)	Canada	Vancouver Canucks	Seattle Breakers (WHL)
131	Chris Brant (LW)	Canada	Hartford Whalers	Sault Ste. Marie Greyhounds (OHL)
132	Mike Kelfer (C)	United States	Minnesota North Stars	St. John's School (USHS–MA)
133	Neil Pilon (D)	Canada	New York Rangers	Kamloops Blazers (WHL)
134	Thomas Bjuhr (LW)	Sweden	Detroit Red Wings	AIK IF (Sweden)
135	Tim Flanagan (C)	Canada	Los Angeles Kings	Michigan Technological University (WCHA)
136	Per Martinelle (RW)	Sweden	Boston Bruins	AIK IF (Sweden)
137	Victor Posa (D)	United States	Chicago Black Hawks	University of Wisconsin Madison (WCHA)
138	Pat Jablonski (G)	United States	St. Louis Blues	Detroit Compuware Ambassadors (NAHL)
139	Kurt Lackten (RW)	Canada	New York Islanders	Moose Jaw Warriors (WHL)
140	Petri Matikainen (D)	Finland	Buffalo Sabres	SaPKo (Finland)
141	Mike Oliverio (F)	Canada	Quebec Nordiques	Sault Ste. Marie Greyhounds (OHL)
142	Ed Cristofoli (RW)	Canada	Montreal Canadiens	Penticton Knights (BCJHL)
143	Stu Grimson (LW)	Canada	Calgary Flames	Regina Pats (WHL)
144	Brent Mowery (C)	Canada	Winnipeg Jets	Summerland Buckaroos (BCJHL)
145	Jamie Nadjiwan (LW)	Canada	Washington Capitals	Sudbury Wolves (OHL)
146	Shawn Tyers (RW)	Canada	Edmonton Oilers	Kitchener Rangers (OHL)
147	Tony Horacek (LW)	Canada	Philadelphia Flyers	Kelowna Wings (WHL)
^{Reference:}

=== Round eight ===
#	Player	Nationality	NHL team	College/junior/club team
148	Andy Donahue (C)	United States	Toronto Maple Leafs	Belmont Hill School (USHS–MA)
149	Paul Stanton (D)	United States	Pittsburgh Penguins	Catholic Memorial School (USHS–MA)
150	Ed Krayer (C)	United States	New Jersey Devils	St. Paul's School (USHS–NH)
151	Hakan Ahlund (RW)	Sweden	Vancouver Canucks	Orebro IK (Sweden)
152	Brian Puhalski (LW)	Canada	Hartford Whalers	Notre Dame Hounds (SJHL)
153	Ross Johnson (C)	Canada	Minnesota North Stars	Rochester Mayo High School (USHS–MA)
154	Larry Bernard (LW)	Canada	New York Rangers	Seattle Breakers (WHL)
155	Mike Luckraft (D)	United States	Detroit Red Wings	Burnsville High School (USHS–MN)
156	John Hyduke (G)	Canada	Los Angeles Kings	Hibbing High School (USHS–MN)
157	Randy Burridge (LW)	Canada	Boston Bruins	Peterborough Petes (OHL)
158	John Reid (G)	Canada	Chicago Black Hawks	Belleville Bulls (OHL)
159	Scott Brickey (RW)	United States	St. Louis Blues	Port Huron Flags (NAHL)
160	Hank Lammens (D)	Canada	New York Islanders	St. Lawrence University (ECAC)
161	Trent Kaese (RW)	Canada	Buffalo Sabres	Lethbridge Broncos (WHL)
162	Mario Brunetta (G)	Canada	Quebec Nordiques	Quebec Remparts (QMJHL)
163	Mike Claringbull (D)	Canada	Montreal Canadiens	Medicine Hat Tigers (WHL)
164	Nate Smith (D)	United States	Calgary Flames	Lawrence Academy (USHS–MA)
165	Tom Draper (G)	Canada	Winnipeg Jets	University of Vermont (Hockey East)
166	Mark Haarmann (D)	Canada	Washington Capitals	Oshawa Generals (OHL)
167	Tony Fairfield (RW)	Canada	Edmonton Oilers	St. Albert Saints (AJHL)
168	Mike Cusack (RW)	Canada	Philadelphia Flyers	Dubuque Fighting Saints (USHL)
^{Reference:}

=== Round nine ===
#	Player	Nationality	NHL team	College/junior/club team
169	Todd Whittemore (C)	United States	Toronto Maple Leafs	Kent School (USHS–CT)
170	Jim Paek (D)	Canada	Pittsburgh Penguins	Oshawa Generals (OHL)
171	Jamie Huscroft (D)	Canada	New Jersey Devils	Seattle Breakers (WHL)
172	Curtis Hunt (D)	Canada	Vancouver Canucks	Prince Albert Raiders (WHL)
173	Greg Dornbach (C)	United States	Hartford Whalers	Miami University (CCHA)
174	Tim Helmer (RW)	Canada	Minnesota North Stars	Ottawa 67's (OHL)
175	Stephane Brochu (D)	Canada	New York Rangers	Quebec Remparts (QMJHL)
176	Rob Schena (D)	United States	Detroit Red Wings	St. John's School (USHS–MA)
177	Steve Horner (RW)	Canada	Los Angeles Kings	Henry Carr Crusaders (MetJHL)
178	Gord Cruickshank (C)	Canada	Boston Bruins	Providence College (Hockey East)
179	Richard Laplante (C)	Canada	Chicago Black Hawks	University of Vermont (Hockey East)
180	Jeff Urban (LW)	United States	St. Louis Blues	Minnetonka High School (USHS–MN)
181	Rich Wiest (C)	Canada	New York Islanders	Lethbridge Broncos (WHL)
182	Jiri Sejba (F)	Czechoslovakia	Buffalo Sabres	Dukla Jihlava (Czechoslovakia)
183	Brit Peer (RW)	Canada	Quebec Nordiques	Sault Ste. Marie Greyhounds (OHL)
184	Roger Beedon (G)	Canada	Montreal Canadiens	Sarnia Legionnaires (OPJHL)
185	Darryl Olsen (D)	Canada	Calgary Flames	St. Albert Saints (AJHL)
186	Neven Kardum (C)	Canada	Winnipeg Jets	Henry Carr Crusaders (MetJHL)
187	Steve Hollett (LW)	Canada	Washington Capitals	Sault Ste. Marie Greyhounds (OHL)
188	Kelly Buchberger (RW)	Canada	Edmonton Oilers	Moose Jaw Warriors (WHL)
189	Gord Murphy (D)	Canada	Philadelphia Flyers	Oshawa Generals (OHL)
^{Reference:}

=== Round ten ===
#	Player	Nationality	NHL team	College/junior/club team
190	Bobby Reynolds (LW)	United States	Toronto Maple Leafs	St. Clair Shores Falcons (NAHL)
191	Steve Shaunessy (D)	United States	Pittsburgh Penguins	North Reading High School (USHS–MA)
192	Terry Shold (LW)	United States	New Jersey Devils	International Falls High School (USHS–MN)
193	Carl Valimont (D)	United States	Vancouver Canucks	University of Massachusetts Lowell (Hockey East)
194	Paul Tory (RW)	Canada	Hartford Whalers	University of Illinois at Chicago (CCHA)
195	Gordie Ernst (C)	United States	Minnesota North Stars	Cranston East High School (USHS–RI)
196	Steve Nemeth (RW)	Canada	New York Rangers	Lethbridge Broncos (WHL)
197	Erik Hamalainen (D)	Finland	Detroit Red Wings	Lukko (Finland)
198	Maurizio Mansi (F)	Canada	Montreal Canadiens (from Los Angeles)^{1}	Rensselaer Polytechnic Institute (ECAC)
199	Dave Buda (LW)	Canada	Boston Bruins	Streetsville Derbys (OPJHL)
200	Brad Hamilton (D)	Canada	Chicago Black Hawks	Aurora Tigers (OPJHL)
201	Vince Guidotti (D)	United States	St. Louis Blues	Noble and Greenough School (USHS–MA)
202	Real Arsenault (LW)	Canada	New York Islanders	Prince Andrew Secondary School (Canadian HS–NS)
203	Boyd Sutton (C)	United States	Buffalo Sabres	Stratford Cullitons (OPJHL)
204	Tom Sasso (C)	United States	Quebec Nordiques	Babson College (ECAC East)
205	Chad Arthur (LW)	United States	Montreal Canadiens	Stratford Cullitons (OPJHL)
206	Peter Romberg (D)	West Germany	Calgary Flames	ECD Iserlohn (Germany)
207	Dave Quigley (G)	Canada	Winnipeg Jets	Univerviste de Moncton (CIAU)
208	Dallas Eakins (D)	Canada	Washington Capitals	Peterborough Petes (OHL)
209	Mario Barbe (D)	Canada	Edmonton Oilers	Chicoutimi Sagueneens (QMJHL)
210	Bob Beers (D)	United States	Boston Bruins (from Philadelphia)^{2}	Buffalo Jr. Sabres (NAHL)
^{Reference:}

1. The Los Angeles Kings' tenth-round pick went to the Montreal Canadiens as the result of a trade on November 18, 1984 that sent Steve Shutt to Los Angeles in exchange for this pick.
2. The Philadelphia Flyers' tenth-round pick went to the Boston Bruins as the result of a trade on May 24, 1984 that sent Ian Armstrong to Philadelphia in exchange for this pick.

=== Round eleven ===
#	Player	Nationality	NHL team	College/junior/club team
211	Tim Armstrong (C)	Canada	Toronto Maple Leafs	Toronto Marlboros (OHL)
212	Doug Greschuk (D)	Canada	Pittsburgh Penguins	St. Albert Saints (AJHL)
213	Jamie McKinley (RW)	Canada	New Jersey Devils	Guelph Platers (OHL)
214	Igor Larionov (C)	Soviet Union	Vancouver Canucks	CSKA Moscow (USSR)
215	Jerry Pawloski (D)	United States	Hartford Whalers	Harvard University (ECAC)
216	Ladislav Lubina (RW)	Czechoslovakia	Minnesota North Stars	LTC Pardubice (Czechoslovakia)
217	Robert Burakovsky (RW)	Sweden	New York Rangers	Leksands IF (Sweden)
218	Bo Svanberg (C)	Sweden	Detroit Red Wings	Farjestad BK (Sweden)
219	Trent Ciprick (RW)	Canada	Los Angeles Kings	Brandon Wheat Kings (WHL)
220	John Byce (RW)	United States	Boston Bruins	Madison Memorial High School (USHS–WI)
221	Ian Pound (D)	Canada	Chicago Black Hawks	Kitchener Rangers (OHL)
222	Ron Saatzer (C)	United States	St. Louis Blues	Hopkins High School (USHS–MN)
223	Mike Volpe (G)	Canada	New York Islanders	Halifax Lions (MTJHL)
224	Guy Larose (C)	Canada	Buffalo Sabres	Guelph Platers (OHL)
225	Gary Murphy (D)	United States	Quebec Nordiques	Arlington Catholic High School (USHS–MA)
226	Mike Bishop (D)	Canada	Montreal Canadiens	Sarnia Legionnaires (OPJHL)
227	Alexander Kozhevnikov (F)	Soviet Union	Calgary Flames	Spartak Moscow (USSR)
228	Chris Norton (D)	Canada	Winnipeg Jets	Cornell University (ECAC)
229	Steve Hrynewich (C)	Canada	Washington Capitals	Ottawa 67's (OHL)
230	Peter Headon (C)	Canada	Edmonton Oilers	Notre Dame Hounds (SJHL)
231	Rod Williams (RW)	Canada	Philadelphia Flyers	Kelowna Wings (WHL)
^{Reference:}

=== Round twelve ===
#	Player	Nationality	NHL team	College/junior/club team
232	Mitch Murphy (G)	Canada	Toronto Maple Leafs	St. Paul's School (USHS–NH)
233	Gregory Choules (LW)	Canada	Pittsburgh Penguins	Chicoutimi Sagueneens (QMJHL)
234	David Williams (D)	United States	New Jersey Devils	Choate Rosemary Hall (USHS–CT)
235	Darren Taylor (LW)	Canada	Vancouver Canucks	Calgary Wranglers (WHL)
236	Bruce Hill (LW)	Canada	Hartford Whalers	University of Denver (WCHA)
237	Tommy Sjodin (D)	Sweden	Minnesota North Stars	Timra IK (Sweden)
238	Rudy Poeschek (D)	Canada	New York Rangers	Kamloops Blazers (WHL)
239	Mikael Lindman (D)	Sweden	Detroit Red Wings	AIK IF (Sweden)
240	Marian Horvath (LW)	Czechoslovakia	Los Angeles Kings	HC Slovan Bratislava (Czechoslovakia)
241	Marc West (C)	Canada	Boston Bruins	Burlington Cougars (OPJHL)
242	Richard Braccia (LW)	United States	Chicago Black Hawks	Avon Old Farms (USHS–CT)
243	Dave Jecha (D)	United States	St. Louis Blues	Minnetonka High School (USHS–MN)
244	Tony Grenier (C)	Canada	New York Islanders	Prince Albert Raiders (WHL)
245	Ken Baumgartner (LW)	Canada	Buffalo Sabres	Prince Albert Raiders (WHL)
246	Jean Bois (LW)	Canada	Quebec Nordiques	Trois-Rivieres Draveurs (QMJHL)
247	John Ferguson Jr. (LW)	Canada	Montreal Canadiens	Winnipeg South Blues (MJHL)
248	Bill Gregoire (D)	Canada	Calgary Flames	Victoria Cougars (WHL)
249	Anssi Melametsa (RW)	Finland	Winnipeg Jets	HIFK (Finland)
250	Frank Di Muzio (LW)	Canada	Washington Capitals	Belleville Bulls (OHL)
251	John Haley (G)	United States	Edmonton Oilers	Hull High School (USHS–MA)
252	Paul Maurice (D)	Canada	Philadelphia Flyers	Windsor Compuware Spitfires (OHL)
^{Reference:}

= NHL All-Star team ·	= NHL All-Star ·	= NHL All-Star and NHL All-Star team ·	= Hall of Famers

== Draftees based on nationality ==
Rank	Country	Amount
	North America	222
1	Canada	165
2	United States	57
	Europe	30
3	Sweden	16
4	Czechoslovakia	7
5	Finland	4
6	Soviet Union	2
7	West Germany	1

== See also ==
- 1985–86 NHL season
- List of NHL players
