= Mike Dark =

Canadian retired ice hockey defenceman

- Born: 17 September 1963 (age 61); Sarnia, Ontario, Canada
- Height: 6 ft 3 in (191 cm)
- Weight: 210 lb (95 kg; 15 st 0 lb)
- Position: Defence
- Shot: Right
- Played for: St. Louis Blues; Peterborough Pirates
- NHL draft: 124th overall, 1982; Montreal Canadiens
- Playing career: 1986–1999

Michael Dark (born September 17, 1963) is a Canadian retired ice hockey defenceman. He played 43 games in the National Hockey League with the St. Louis Blues during the 1986–87 and 1987–88 seasons. The rest of his career, which lasted from 1986 to 1999, was mainly spent in the minor leagues. Dark was born in Sarnia, Ontario, Canada.

== Career statistics ==
=== Regular season and playoffs ===
			Regular season					Playoffs
Season	Team	League	GP	G	A	Pts	PIM	GP	G	A	Pts	PIM
1979–80	Sarnia Black Hawks	Midget	50	18	32	50	—	—	—	—	—	—
1980–81	Sarnia Bees	WOHL	41	20	40	60	—	—	—	—	—	—
1981–82	Sarnia Bees	WOHL	41	13	30	43	86	—	—	—	—	—
1982–83	Rensselaer Polytechnic Institute	ECAC	29	3	16	19	54	—	—	—	—	—
1983–84	Rensselaer Polytechnic Institute	ECAC	38	2	12	14	60	—	—	—	—	—
1984–85	Rensselaer Polytechnic Institute	ECAC	36	7	26	33	76	—	—	—	—	—
1985–86	Rensselaer Polytechnic Institute	ECAC	32	7	29	36	58	—	—	—	—	—
1986–87	St. Louis Blues	NHL	13	2	0	2	2	—	—	—	—	—
1986–87	Peoria Rivermen	IHL	42	4	11	15	93	—	—	—	—	—
1987–88	St. Louis Blues	NHL	30	3	6	9	12	—	—	—	—	—
1987–88	Peoria Rivermen	IHL	37	21	12	33	97	2	0	0	0	4
1988–89	New Haven Nighthawks	AHL	7	0	4	4	4	—	—	—	—	—
1988–89	Salt Lake Golden Eagles	IHL	36	3	12	15	57	—	—	—	—	—
1989–90	Peterborough Pirates	BHL	30	36	24	60	136	—	—	—	—	—
1991–92	Flint Bulldogs	CoHL	1	0	0	0	15	—	—	—	—	—
1991–92	St. Thomas Wildcats	CoHL	2	0	0	0	0	—	—	—	—	—
1995–96	Brantford Smoke	CoHL	11	3	12	15	18	3	1	0	1	2
1996–97	Port Huron Border Cats	CoHL	17	0	2	2	10	5	1	3	4	0
1997–98	Port Huron Border Cats	UHL	12	1	6	7	6	4	0	0	0	4
1998–99	Port Huron Border Cats	UHL	2	0	0	0	0	—	—	—	—	—
IHL totals			115	28	35	63	247	2	0	0	0	4
NHL totals			43	5	6	11	14	—	—	—	—	—

== Awards and honors ==
Award	Year
All-ECAC Hockey First Team	1985–86
AHCA East First-Team All-American	1985–86
