= 2025–26 FPHL season =

The 2025-26 Federal Prospects Hockey League season is the league's 16th season.

== Membership Changes ==
- On January 7, 2025, the league announces that it would be staging four neutral site games at the Stormont Vail Events Center in Topeka, Kansas between January 24 and February 1. The release also indicated "plans for a permanent FPHL team in Topeka for 2025."
- A February 2025 report indicated that a group in Columbus, Indiana, was awarded a conditional expansion team to be known as the Indiana Sentinels. The same report indicated that the Motor City Rockers had been sold and was planning to undergo a rebranding following the season but backed off due to unfavorable feedback from fans.
- On February 13, 2025, the league announced the addition of a team to be based out of the Stormont Vail Events Center in Topeka, Kansas for the 2025–26 season. The announcement was made after the league's two neutral site games averaged over 3,200 fans per game. The team name would be announced on May 5 as the Topeka Scarecrows.
- On April 16, 2025, the league announced the addition of an expansion team to be based out of the Florence Civic Center in Florence, South Carolina for the 2025–26 season. On May 5 the team would be announced as the Pee Dee Icecats. The league considered the team a relocation of the HC Venom team from the 2024–25 season and the team did not participate in the league's expansion draft to stock the other two teams to join the league for the 2025–26 season.
- In April 2025 reports surfaced that the Danville Dashers would not be returning to the David S. Palmer Arena for the 2025–26 season. The league would later indicate it was looking for new ownership for the team and was planning on returning to that market in the future.
- On May 7, 2025, the Motor City Rockers announced that they would in fact be going dormant for the 2025–26 season. By April 2026 the team appeared ready to return to the league for the 2026–27 season.
- On May 8, 2025, the league officially announced the addition of the Columbus, Indiana based Indiana Sentinels. The team will be based out of the 1,150 seat Hamilton Community Center & Ice Arena with the city already having plans for a new 2,500-seat arena to be built in the city
- On June 2, 2025, the recently sold Mississippi Sea Wolves announced that they would be renamed the Biloxi Breakers.
- By mid-August 2025 preliminary discussions had begun with the city of Alexandria, Louisiana about bringing a franchise to the city for the 2026–27 season. The city previously had the Alexandria Warthogs, based out of the Rapides Parish Coliseum, playing in the Western Professional Hockey League from 1998 to 2000.
- On September 4, 2025, the Carolina Thunderbirds announce following a change in team ownership that they will be renamed the Twin City Thunderbirds.
- On October 21, 2025, the Monroe Moccasins issued a statement indicating that Parker Moskal was no longer involved in the operation of the organization. and the following day the Pee Dee Icecats also issued a statement indicating the same thing. The league would issue a statement about the situation and indicated that the league is operating in unity to strengthen the league.
- An October 21, 2025 Facebook post indicated that the Indiana Sentinels were having some serious issues with the lack of involvement of team ownership in funding and running the team. This situation puts the future of the team in question.
- In early October 2025 reports surfaced indicating the likely announcement of a team to be based out of the Ralph Engelstad Arena in Thief River Falls, Minnesota being added to the league for the 2026–27 season. The announcement is made official on November 5. At a December 16th Thief River Falls City Council meeting it was announced that the team would be called the Minnesota Northern Lights. By late April the possibility of the team joining the league for 2026-27 was in question.
- The league has a neutral site game scheduled for the Mennen Arena in Morris Township, New Jersey scheduled in March. The league usually plays up talk of an expansion team for the area but it is not the case this time.
- Word of the upcoming announcement of an expansion team to be based out of the Landers Center in Southaven, Mississippi was indicated in late March 2026. On March 25, 2026, the league made the announcement official with the team taking the temporary moniker of Mid South Pro Hockey. The team immediate announced a name the team contest. The team would be named the Mid-South Monarchs.
- In April 2026 an online report indicated that the Baton Rouge Zydeco (around April 17) and Biloxi Breakers (on or about April 22) had folded or were close to folding. Indications are that attempts are being made to save both teams. By early May it was reported that the Baton Rouge team had already started to lay off staff.
- Also in April 2026 the ownership Watertown Wolves, who is also the league commissioner, had indicated that the organization is working on trying to find new ownership to keep the team going in Watertown. By late April it was indicated that a perspective new owner may be in the process of purchasing the team. By early May it was indicated that a new local owner had stepped forward.
- According to an online report, the Athens Rock Lobsters and possibly some other teams southeastern-US based teams were looking to join the SPHL for the 2026–27 season. Joining the SPHL was the ownership's original plan for 2025–26. On May 13, 2026, the move to the SPHL was confirmed by that league.
- On May 5, 2026, the addition of a team to be based out of the Frontwave Arena in the San Diego suburb of Oceanside, California to the league for the 2026–27 season.
- On May 6, 2026, the league announced the addition of the Fresno Falcons to be based out of the Selland Arena for the 2026–27 season, reviving a team name that dates back to 1946 in the city.
- On May 11, 2026, word leaked that a team to be based out of the Adventist Health Arena in Stockton, California will be added to the league for the 2026–27 season. A formal announcement is expected on May 13. The team was announced as being called the Stockton Thunder, which was the name of an ECHL team that played in the city from 2005 to 2015.
- On May 12, 2026, the Motor City Rockers announced that they are relocating to the Yack Arena in Wyandotte, Michigan when they return to the league for the 2026–27 season.
- On May 30, 2026, the SPHL announced the conditional approval for the addition of the Pee Dee Icecats, who were members of the Federal Prospects Hockey League for the 2025–26 season.
- On June 3, 2026, it was reported that the ownership of the Binghamton Black Bears had assumed control of the Baton Rouge, Louisiana franchise and would likely be assuming a new identity. On July 22, 2026, the team was announced as being named the Baton Rouge Kingfish, which was the name of a previous ECHL team in the city.

== Teams ==
| Team | Home arena | Capacity | City | Joined League |
|---|---|---|---|---|
Continental Division
| Athens Rock Lobsters | Akins Ford Arena | 5,500 | Athens, Georgia | 2024 |
| Baton Rouge Zydeco | Raising Cane's River Center Arena | 8,900 | Baton Rouge, Louisiana | 2023 |
| Biloxi Breakers | Mississippi Coast Coliseum | 9,150 | Biloxi, Mississippi | 2022 |
| Twin City Thunderbirds | LJVM Coliseum Annex | 4,000 | Winston-Salem, North Carolina | 2017 |
| Columbus River Dragons | Columbus Civic Center | 7,459 | Columbus, Georgia | 2019 |
| Pee Dee Icecats | Florence Civic Center | 7,526 | Florence, South Carolina | 2025 |
| Monroe Moccasins | Monroe Civic Center | 5,600 | Monroe, Louisiana | 2024 |
Empire Division
| Binghamton Black Bears | Visions Veterans Memorial Arena | 4,710 | Binghamton, New York | 2021 |
| Blue Ridge Bobcats | Hitachi Energy Arena | 5,300 | Wytheville, Virginia | 2023 |
| Danbury Hat Tricks | Danbury Ice Arena | 3,000 | Danbury, Connecticut | 2019 |
| Indiana Sentinels | Hamilton Community Center & Ice Arena | 1,150 | Columbus, Indiana | 2025 |
| Port Huron Prowlers | McMorran Place | 3,400 | Port Huron, Michigan | 2015 |
| Topeka Scarecrows | Stormont Vail Events Center | 7.773 | Topeka, Kansas | 2025 |
| Watertown Wolves | Watertown Municipal Arena | 2,000 | Watertown, New York | 2010 |

== Standings ==
=== Continental Division ===
| Team | GP | W | L | OW | SW | OL | GF | GA | Pts | % |
|---|---|---|---|---|---|---|---|---|---|---|
| Athens Rock Lobsters | 56 | 35 | 11 | 5 | 4 | 1 | 275 | 180 | 124 | .738 |
| Monroe Moccasins | 56 | 35 | 20 | 3 | 0 | 8 | 275 | 180 | 119 | .708 |
| Columbus River Dragons | 56 | 26 | 18 | 5 | 1 | 6 | 238 | 215 | 96 | .571 |
| Pee Dee Icecats | 56 | 24 | 25 | 5 | 2 | 0 | 207 | 197 | 81 | .482 |
| Twin City Thunderbirds | 56 | 22 | 29 | 4 | 0 | 1 | 193 | 207 | 75 | .446 |
| Baton Rouge Zydeco | 56 | 15 | 33 | 2 | 0 | 6 | 149 | 222 | 55 | .327 |
| Biloxi Breakers | 56 | 6 | 46 | 0 | 2 | 2 | 164 | 326 | 24 | .143 |

=== Empire Division ===
| Team | GP | W | L | OW | SW | OL | GF | GA | Pts | % |
|---|---|---|---|---|---|---|---|---|---|---|
| Binghamton Black Bears | 56 | 46 | 6 | 0 | 3 | 2 | 292 | 126 | 143 | .851 |
| Port Huron Prowlers | 56 | 31 | 17 | 4 | 2 | 2 | 195 | 146 | 107 | .637 |
| Blue Ridge Bobcats | 56 | 29 | 21 | 0 | 3 | 3 | 222 | 195 | 96 | .571 |
| Topeka Scarcrows | 56 | 24 | 20 | 6 | 0 | 6 | 187 | 165 | 90 | .536 |
| Danbury Hat Tricks | 56 | 20 | 26 | 3 | 2 | 5 | 189 | 201 | 75 | .446 |
| Indiana Sentinels | 56 | 12 | 37 | 0 | 3 | 4 | 136 | 237 | 46 | .274 |
| Watertown Wolves | 56 | 11 | 36 | 2 | 1 | 6 | 170 | 295 | 45 | .268 |

Note: Three points for a regulation win, two for an overtime win, one for an overtime loss, none for a regulation loss.

== Commissioners Cup Playoffs ==
The top four teams in each division qualify for the playoffs. The quarterfinal and semifinal rounds are best-of-three with the league final being best-of-five.

=== Quarterfinals ===
- Pee Dee Icecats defeated Athens Rock Lobsters 2 games to none (8–2, 7–2)
- Columbus River Dragons defeated Monroe Moccasins 2 games to 1 (8–3, 0–3, 2–1)
- Binghamton Black Bears defeated Topeka Scarcrows 2 games to none (4–3, 6–2)
- Port Huron Prowlers defeated Blue Ridge Bobcats 2 games to 1 (3-4 (ot), 5–1, 4–2)

=== Semifinals ===
- Pee Dee Icecats defeated Columbus River Dragons 2 games to 1 (1–3, 3-2 (ot), 4-3 (ot))
- Binghamton Black Bears defeated Port Huron Prowlers 2 games to 1 (1–0, 1–5, 2–1)

=== Final ===
- Binghamton Black Bears defeated Pee Dee Icecats 3 games to 1 (2–5, 2–1, 8–1, 4–2)
