= 2026–27 FPHL season =

This is the 2026-27 Federal Prospects Hockey League season. This is the league's 17th season.

== Membership Changes ==
- On May 7, 2025 the Motor City Rockers announced that they would in fact be going dormant for the 2025–26 season. By April 2026 the team appeared ready to return to the league for the 2026–27 season.
- In early October 2025 reports surfaced indicating the likely announcement of a team to be based out of the Ralph Engelstad Arena in Thief River Falls, Minnesota being added to the league for the 2026–27 season. The announcement is made official on November 5th. At a December 16th Thief River Falls City Council meeting it was announced that the team would be called the Minnesota Northern Lights. By late April the possibility of the team joining the league for 2026-27 was in question.
- Word of the upcoming announcement of an expansion team to be based out of the Landers Center in Southaven, Mississippi was indicated in late March 2026. On March 25, 2026 the league made the announcement official with the team taking the temporary moniker of Mid South Pro Hockey. The team immediate announced a name the team contest. The team would be named the Mid-South Monarchs.
- In April 2026 an online report indicated that the Baton Rouge Zydeco (around April 17th) and Biloxi Breakers (on or about April 22nd) had folded or were close to folding. Indications are that attempts are being made to save both teams. By early May it was reported that the Baton Rouge team had already started to lay off staff. The Biloxi Breakers organization went virtually radio silent and never officially announced its folding. It was only until the FPHL announced a dispersal draft for the remaining players that gave fans of the team the official declaration.
- Also in April 2026 the ownership Watertown Wolves, who is also the league commissioner, had indicated that the organization is working on trying to find new ownership to keep the team going in Watertown. By late April it was indicated that a perspective new owner may be in the process of purchasing the team. By early May it was indicated that a new local owner had stepped forward.
- According to an online report, the Athens Rock Lobsters and possibly some other teams southeastern-US based teams were looking to join the SPHL for the 2026–27 season. Joining the SPHL was the ownership's original plan for 2025-26.On May 13, 2026 the move to the SPHL was confirmed by that league.
- On May 5, 2026 the addition of a team to be based out of the Frontwave Arena in the San Diego suburb of Oceanside, California to the league for the 2026–27 season.
- On May 6, 2026 the league announced the addition of the Fresno Falcons to be based out of the Selland Arena for the 2026–27 season, reviving a team name that dates back to 1946 in the city.
- On May 11, 2026 word leaked that a team to be based out of the Adventist Health Arena in Stockton, California will be added to the league for the 2026–27 season. A formal announcement is expected on May 13th. The team was announced as being called the Stockton Thunder, which was the name of an ECHL team that played in the city from 2005 to 2015.
- On May 12, 2026 the Motor City Rockers announced that they are relocating to the Yack Arena in Wyandotte, Michigan when they return to the league for the 2026–27 season.
- On May 30, 2026 the SPHL announced the conditional approval for the addition of the Pee Dee Icecats, who were members of the Federal Prospects Hockey League for the 2025–26 season.
- On June 3, 2026 it was reported that the ownership of the Binghamton Black Bears had assumed control of the Baton Rouge, Louisiana franchise and would likely be assuming a new identity. On July 22, 2026 the team was announced as being named the Baton Rouge Kingfish, which was the name of a previous ECHL team in the city.

== Teams ==
The league revamped to a two conference four division format as a result of a net addition of three teams and the more spread out geography of the league.

Eastern Conference
Atlantic Division
| Team | Home arena | Capacity | City | Joined League |
| Binghamton Black Bears | Visions Veterans Memorial Arena | 4,710 | Binghamton, New York | 2021 |
| Blue Ridge Bobcats | Hitachi Energy Arena | 5,300 | Wytheville, Virginia | 2023 |
| Danbury Hat Tricks | Danbury Ice Arena | 3,000 | Danbury, Connecticut | 2019 |
| Twin City Thunderbirds | LJVM Coliseum Annex | 4,000 | Winston-Salem, North Carolina | 2017 |
Great Lakes Division
| Team | Home arena | Capacity | City | Joined League |
| Indiana Sentinels | Hamilton Community Center & Ice Arena | 1,150 | Columbus, Indiana | 2025 |
| Motor City Rockers | Yack Arena | 3,800 | Wyandotte, Michigan | 2022 |
| Port Huron Prowlers | McMorran Place | 3,400 | Port Huron, Michigan | 2015 |
| Watertown Wolves | Watertown Municipal Arena | 2,000 | Watertown, New York | 2010 |
Western Conference
Delta Division
| Team | Home arena | Capacity | City | Joined League |
| Baton Rouge Kingfish | Raising Cane's River Center Arena | 8,900 | Baton Rouge, Louisiana | 2026 |
| Columbus River Dragons | Columbus Civic Center | 7,459 | Columbus, Georgia | 2019 |
| Mid-South Monarchs | Landers Center | 8,400 | Southaven, Mississippi | 2026 |
| Monroe Moccasins | Monroe Civic Center | 5,600 | Monroe, Louisiana | 2024 |
Frontier Division
| Team | Home arena | Capacity | City | Joined League |
| Fresno Falcons | Selland Arena | 11,300 | Fresno, California | 2026 |
| Minnesota Northern Lights | Ralph Engelstad Arena | 3,569 | Thief River Falls, Minnesota | 2026 |
| Oceanside Shock | Frontwave Arena | 5,500 | Oceanside, California | 2026 |
| Stockton Thunder | Adventist Health Arena | 12,000 | Stockton, California | 2026 |
| Topeka Scarecrows | Stormont Vail Events Center | 7,773 | Topeka, Kansas | 2025 |

== Standings ==
To be added upon completion of the regular season.

== Commissioners Cup Playoffs ==
The top three teams in each division qualify for the playoffs. All rounds except the final are best-of-three, with the final being best-of-five.
