= 2024–25 FPHL season =

This is the 2024-25 Federal Prospects Hockey League season. This is the league's 15th season.

== League Business ==
- On June 11 the league released a fifteenth anniversary logo. As part of the announcement the league indicated an expansion draft will be held for the four expansion teams and that the division alignments have not been finalized but indicated in its wording it would likely be North and South Divisions
- On June 12, 2024, the league announced that it would hold 4 neutral site games at the Stormont Vail Events Center in Topeka, Kansas during the 2024–25 season. The events will gauge a possible expansion team for the arena in the not too distant future.
- During the off season the league officially cancelled the Delaware Thunder franchise. The team had lost its lease for their arena and were attempting to build a new arena in Dover, Delaware. The team had also considered relocation prior to going inactive for the 2023–24 season.

== Membership Changes ==
- The former owner of the Danville Dashers franchise has indicated he would like to place another team in Danville, Illinois' David S. Palmer Arena for the 2024–25 season. The arena board replaced his previous team with new franchise in the Southern Professional Hockey League in 2020. That franchise the Vermilion County Bobcats would end up folding in February 2023. The arena board put out a lease proposal request for potential teams in the ECHL, SPHL, Federal Prospects Hockey League, or the junior level United States Premier Hockey League.
- On March 28, 2024, the league announced that addition of a team to be based out of the soon to be opened Classic Center Arena in Athens, Georgia, which will begin play with the 2024–25 season. On May 15, 2024, the name of the team was announced as the Athens Rock Lobsters as a tribute to the locally based band the B-52's and their famous song.
- On May 1, 2024, the junior level North American Hockey League announced the addition of the Elmira Aviators to begin play in the East Division with the 2024–25 season. The team will be based out of the First Arena in Elmira, New York. This called into question the future of the Elmira River Sharks beyond the 2023–24 season. On May 16, 2024, it was announced that the franchise was sold and would be relocating to another city in New York State for the 2024–25 season.
- On May 20, 2024, it was announced that the Elmira River Sharks was sold to the owner of the semi-pro Hudson Valley Vipers. The team will be renamed the Hudson Valley Venom and play their games out of the 3,200 seat McCann Ice Arena in Poughkeepsie, New York. It was later announced that the Venom will play at the Ice Time Sports Complex in Newburgh, New York.
- On June 5, 2024, the league announced the addition of the Monroe Moccasins to the league for the 2024–25 season. The team will be based out of the Monroe Civic Center in Monroe, Louisiana.
- The Akins Ford Arena was due to host the opening home games for the Athens Rock Lobsters on December 6 and 7; but, the arena failed its certificate of occupancy inspection and the games had to be cancelled. The fire system had not been fully tested was the reason for the failure. The team had already played its first 11 games on the road prior to the arena issues and due to the complexity of the system it was unknown when the team would be able to play in the arena. The team's December 12 game was also postponed but the team would be able to play its first home game on December 13.
- The Hudson Valley Venom apparently ran into issues with the Ice Time Sports Complex and were forced to relocate several home games to the home rink of their opponents after it was announced that the November 22nd game was postponed due to unforeseen arena and logistical issues. A source indicated later on that the team may have in fact been evicted from the arena citing financial issues as the reason. It was announced on December 9, 2024, that the team was sold to PKB LLC, and rebranded as HC Venom and would be planning to play the remainder of the season as a traveling team playing the remainder of their schedule as either the visiting team or playing as the home team in potential expansion markets for the league. As of December 16 the only remaining games the team had listed on the website were for game as the visiting team against existing league teams. For a while the team was playing some games in potential new markets for the league. On January 17, 2025, the team would announce that they found a home in the McCann Ice Arena in Poughkeepsie, New York, which was the original intended home for the franchise.
- On January 7, 2025, the league announces that it would be staging four neutral site games at the Stormont Vail Events Center in Topeka, Kansas between January 24 and February 1. The release also indicated "plans for a permanent FPHL team in Topeka for 2025."
- A February 2025 report indicated that a group in Columbus, Indiana was awarded a conditional expansion team to be known as the Indiana Sentinels. The same report indicated that the Motor City Rockers had been sold and was planning to undergo a rebranding following the season but backed off due to unfavorable feedback from fans.
- On February 13, 2025, the league announced the addition of a team to be based out of the Stormont Vail Events Center in Topeka, Kansas for the 2025–26 season. The announcement was made after the league's two neutral site games averaged over 3,200 fans per game. The team named would be announced on May 5 as the Topeka Scarecrows.
- On April 16, 2025, the league announced the addition of an expansion team to be based out of the Florence Civic Center in Florence, South Carolina for the 2025–26 season. On May 5 the team would be announced as the Pee Dee Icecats. The league considered the team a relocation of the HC Venom team from the 2024–25 season and the team did not participate in the league's expansion draft to stock the other two teams to join the league for the 2025–26 season.
- In April 2025 reports surfaced that the Danville Dashers would not be returning to the David S. Palmer Arena for the 2025–26 season. The league would later indicate it was looking for new ownership for the team and was planning on returning to that market in the future.
- On May 7, 2025, the Motor City Rockers announced that they would in fact be going dormant for the 2025–26 season.
- On May 8, 2025, the league officially announced the addition of the Columbus, Indiana based Indiana Sentinels. The team will be based out of the 1,150 seat Hamilton Community Center & Ice Arena with the city already having plans for a new 2,500-seat arena to be built in the city
- On June 2, 2025, the recently sold Mississippi Sea Wolves announced that they would be renamed the Biloxi Breakers.

== Teams ==
Team	Home arena	Capacity	City	Joined League
Continental Division
Athens Rock Lobsters	Akins Ford Arena	5,500	Athens, Georgia	2024
Baton Rouge Zydeco	Raising Cane's River Center Arena	8,900	Baton Rouge, Louisiana	2023
Blue Ridge Bobcats	Hitachi Energy Arena	5,300	Wytheville, Virginia	2023
Carolina Thunderbirds	LJVM Coliseum Annex	4,000	Winston-Salem, North Carolina	2017
Columbus River Dragons	Columbus Civic Center	7,459	Columbus, Georgia	2019
Mississippi Sea Wolves	Mississippi Coast Coliseum	9,150	Biloxi, Mississippi	2022
Monroe Moccasins	Monroe Civic Center	5,600	Monroe, Louisiana	2024
Empire Division
Binghamton Black Bears	Visions Veterans Memorial Arena	4,710	Binghamton, New York	2021
Danbury Hat Tricks	Danbury Ice Arena	3,000	Danbury, Connecticut	2019
Danville Dashers	David S. Palmer Arena	2,350	Danville, Illinois	2024
Hudson Valley Venom/HC Venom	Ice Time Sports Complex	1,288	Newburgh, New York	2024
Motor City Rockers	Big Boy Arena	3,330	Fraser, Michigan	2022
Port Huron Prowlers	McMorran Place	3,400	Port Huron, Michigan	2015
Watertown Wolves	Watertown Municipal Arena	2,000	Watertown, New York	2010

== Standings ==
=== Continental Division ===
Team	GP	W	L	OW	SW	OL	GF	GA	Pts	%
Carolina Thunderbirds	56	38	11	0	3	4	223	127	124	.738
Athens Rock Lobsters	56	32	10	4	7	3	220	137	121	.720
Columbus River Dragons	56	28	16	4	2	4	192	159	100	.617
Blue Ridge Bobcats	56	28	21	1	0	6	194	172	92	.548
Baton Rouge Zydeco	56	23	19	5	3	6	194	173	91	.542
Monroe Moccasins	56	18	25	1	3	9	185	199	71	.423
Mississippi Sea Wolves	56	10	41	0	1	4	122	256	36	.214

=== Empire Division ===
Team	GP	W	L	OW	SW	OL	GF	GA	Pts	%
Binghamton Black Bears	56	44	6	3	2	1	289	141	143	.851
Danbury Hat Tricks	56	28	15	1	4	8	245	191	102	.607
Port Huron Prowlers	56	24	18	2	5	6	200	161	92	.558
Watertown Wolves	56	23	23	3	2	4	230	215	83	.503
Motor City Rockers	56	13	31	3	3	5	174	237	56	.339
HC Venom	56	10	36	2	2	3	153	258	41	.258
Danville Dashers	56	2	49	0	1	4	126	321	12	.071

Note: Three points for a regulation win, two for an overtime win, one for an overtime loss, none for a regulation loss.

== Commissioners cup Playoffs ==
The top four teams in each division qualify for the playoffs. The fourth and fifth place teams meet in a wild card play-in game. The quarterfinal and semifinal rounds are best-of-three with the league final being best-of-five.

=== Wild Card ===
- Blue Ridge Bobcats defeated Baton Rouge Zydeco 5–2
- Watertown Wolves defeated Motor City Rockers 4–2

=== Quarterfinals ===
- Carolina Thunderbirds defeated Blue Ridge Bobcats 2 games to none
- Columbus River Dragons defeated Athens Rock Lobsters 2 games to none
- Binghamton Black Bears defeated Watertown Wolves 2 games to none
- Port Huron Prowlers defeated Danbury Hat Tricks 2 games to 1

=== Semifinals ===
- Carolina Thunderbirds defeated Columbus River Dragons 2 games to none
- Binghamton Black Bears defeated Port Huron Prowlers 2 games to 1

=== Final ===
- Binghamton Black Bears defeated Carolina Thunderbirds 3 games to none
