= 2023–24 FPHL season =

- League: Federal Prospects Hockey League
- Sport: Ice hockey
- Teams: 11
- Season champions: Columbus River Dragons

Commissioners Cup playoffs
- Champions: Binghamton Black Bears
- Runners-up: Carolina Thunderbirds

Seasons
- 2022–23 2024–25

The 2023–24 Federal Prospects Hockey League season was the fourteenth season of the Federal Prospects Hockey League (FPHL). The regular season began on October 13, 2023, and concluded on April 13, 2023. The 2024 Commissioners Cup playoffs began on April 17. The finals between the Binghamton Black Bears and the Carolina Thunderbirds began on May 3 and ended on May 10 with a Binghamton victory.

== League changes ==
On June 16, 2023, it was announced that the Elmira Mammoth were folding, and that there would be a new team in Elmira. On July 8, 2023, the Elmira River Sharks were revealed. The Delaware Thunder announced on June 19, 2023, that the team would be dormant in the future to focus on a relocation out of Harrington The league would hold a Dispersal Draft on June 27 were all teams would draft the Thunder players to their respective teams.

Two new FPHL franchises were announced in the off-season. It was first revealed on April 11, 2023, that the city of Baton Rouge, Louisiana and the Raising Cane's River Center Arena had secured an agreement to bring a team to the city. It was later announced on July 13 that the team would be named the Zydeco. The second franchise was announced on July 27, 2023. The team would be located in Wytheville, Virginia, and would be called the Blue Ridge Bobcats.

The league kept the Empire and Continental Divisions, with the Binghamton Black Bears, Danbury Hat Tricks, Elmira River Sharks, Motor City Rockers, and the Watertown Wolves in the Empire. In the Continental Division were the Baton Rouge Zydeco, Blue Ridge Bobcats, Carolina Thunderbirds, Columbus River Dragons, Mississippi Sea Wolves, and the Port Huron Prowlers.

== Regular season ==
Watertown had to postpone their game on October 20 vs. Elmira because of water issues in the arena. On November 8 it was announced the league would be making a divisional change. Motor City would be moving from the Continental Division to the Empire Division, and Blue Ridge would move from the Empire to the Continental.

Final standings:

Empire Division
| Team | GP | W | L | OTL | PTS | GF | GA | Pts% | Att. |
|---|---|---|---|---|---|---|---|---|---|
| Binghamton Black Bears | 56 | 39 | 10 | 7 | 120 | 276 | 170 | .714 | 3,956 |
| Motor City Rockers | 56 | 33 | 19 | 4 | 97 | 219 | 194 | .577 | 1,016 |
| Danbury Hat Tricks | 56 | 31 | 19 | 6 | 90 | 216 | 192 | .536 | 2,077 |
| Watertown Wolves | 56 | 19 | 31 | 6 | 61 | 193 | 250 | .363 | 893 |
| Elmira River Sharks | 56 | 20 | 34 | 2 | 60 | 189 | 259 | .357 | 1,290 |
Continental Division
| Team | GP | W | L | OTL | PTS | GF | GA | Pts% | Att. |
| Columbus River Dragons | 56 | 45 | 7 | 4 | 134 | 292 | 155 | .798 | 3,538 |
| Carolina Thunderbirds | 56 | 40 | 12 | 4 | 116 | 225 | 149 | .690 | 2,939 |
| Port Huron Prowlers | 56 | 28 | 22 | 6 | 84 | 196 | 207 | .500 | 1,276 |
| Mississippi Sea Wolves | 56 | 21 | 32 | 3 | 61 | 199 | 265 | .363 | 2,684 |
| Baton Rouge Zydeco | 56 | 16 | 36 | 4 | 51 | 154 | 248 | .304 | 3,958 |
| Blue Ridge Bobcats | 56 | 16 | 33 | 7 | 50 | 151 | 221 | .298 | 1,294 |

Qualified for playoffs

== Statistics ==
=== Scoring Leaders ===
The following players led the league in regular season points at the completion of games played on April 13, 2023.

| Player | Team | GP | G | A | Pts | +/– | PIM |
|---|---|---|---|---|---|---|---|
| Justin MacDonald | Columbus River Dragons | 52 | 45 | 72 | 117 | +69 | 28 |
| Gus Ford | Carolina Thunderbirds | 43 | 42 | 46 | 88 | +36 | 92 |
| Tyson Kirkby | Binghamton Black Bears | 54 | 39 | 41 | 80 | +34 | 119 |
| Ryan Hunter | Columbus River Dragons | 52 | 29 | 46 | 75 | +54 | 39 |
| Jonny Ruiz | Danbury Hat Tricks | 53 | 38 | 36 | 74 | +15 | 22 |
| Kyle Moore | Columbus River Dragons | 53 | 24 | 49 | 73 | +49 | 58 |
| Yianni Liarakos | Mississippi Sea Wolves | 30 | 32 | 40 | 72 | -7 | 59 |
| Trevor Lord | Watertown Wolves | 53 | 26 | 44 | 70 | -2 | 202 |
| Dawson Baker | Carolina Thunderbirds | 47 | 31 | 38 | 69 | +27 | 58 |
| Tate Leeson | Watertown Wolves | 45 | 38 | 31 | 69 | +15 | 202 |

=== Leading Goaltenders ===
The following goaltenders led the league in regular season goals against average at the completion of games played on April 13, 2024, while playing at least 1,000 minutes.

| Player | Team | GP | TOI | W | L | OTL | GA | SO | SV% | GAA |
|---|---|---|---|---|---|---|---|---|---|---|
| Mario Cavaliere | Carolina Thunderbirds | 37 | 1,535:47 | 19 | 6 | 2 | 60 | 1 | .925 | 2.34 |
| Connor McAnanama | Binghamton Black Bears | 43 | 1,610:15 | 19 | 7 | 4 | 64 | 2 | .919 | 2.39 |
| Cody Karpinski | Carolina Thunderbirds | 31 | 1,179:32 | 13 | 5 | 1 | 55 | 3 | .902 | 2.80 |
| Breandan Colgan | Columbus River Dragons | 45 | 1,748:30 | 23 | 6 | 1 | 82 | 2 | .896 | 2.81 |
| Trevor Babin | Motor City Rockers | 51 | 2,175:06 | 21 | 12 | 4 | 106 | 0 | .919 | 2.92 |
| Connor McCollum | Danbury Hat Tricks | 52 | 2,278:11 | 24 | 12 | 3 | 114 | 1 | .918 | 3.00 |
| Nolan Egbert | Binghamton Black Bears | 43 | 1,136:27 | 12 | 5 | 2 | 61 | 0 | .892 | 3.22 |
| Owen Liskiewicz | Blue Ridge Bobcats | 45 | 1,392:23 | 9 | 12 | 3 | 79 | 0 | .903 | 3.40 |
| Sammy Bernard | Elmira River Sharks | 41 | 1,935:01 | 15 | 19 | 2 | 115 | 0 | .914 | 3.57 |
| Connor Green | Blue Ridge Bobcats | 55 | 1,612:52 | 6 | 23 | 4 | 107 | 1 | .896 | 3.98 |

== Playoffs ==
The Black Bears and Thunderbirds met in the finals for the first time against each other. This is Binghamton's first time in the finals, and Carolina's third time. Quarterfinal matchups were between Binghamton-Watertown, Motor City-Danbury, Columbus-Mississippi, and Carolina-Port Huron. Binghamton and Columbus swept their respective opponents in two games, while Motor City and Carolina defeated their respective opponents in three games. In the Semi-Finals Binghamton swept Motor City in two games, with Austin Thompson scoring the overtime goal. In the other series, Carolina beat Columbus in three games, with Gus Ford scoring the winning goal in second overtime. In the finals, Binghamton swept Carolina in three games, with Binghamton winning the Commissioners Cup at home in with a 4–3 victory, with Austin Thompson scoring the winning goal.

Quarterfinals (Best of 3)
E1 | Binghamton Black Bears | 2
E4 | Watertown Wolves | 0
E2 | Motor City Rockers | 2
E3 | Danbury Hat Tricks | 1
C1 | Columbus River Dragons | 2
C4 | Mississippi Sea Wolves | 0
C2 | Carolina Thunderbirds | 2
C3 | Port Huron Prowlers | 1

Semifinals (Best of 3)
E1 | Binghamton Black Bears | 2
E2 | Motor City Rockers | 0
C1 | Columbus River Dragons | 1
C2 | Carolina Thunderbirds | 2

Commissioners Cup Finals (Best of 5)
E1 | Binghamton Black Bears | 3
C2 | Carolina Thunderbirds | 0

== FPHL Awards ==
All awards were awarded between April 11 and May 11.

2023-24 FPHL awards
| Award | Recipient(s) | Runner-up | Ref |
|---|---|---|---|
| Commissioners Cup | Binghamton Black Bears | Carolina Thunderbirds | |
| Regular Season Champions | Columbus River Dragons | Binghamton Black Bears | |
| Empire Division Champions | Binghamton Black Bears | Motor City Rockers | |
| Continental Division Champions | Columbus River Dragons | Carolina Thunderbirds | |
| Regular Season MVP | Justin MacDonald (Columbus River Dragons) | - | |
| Commissioners Cup MVP | Gavin Yates (Binghamton Black Bears) | - | |
| Forward of the Year | Gus Ford (Carolina Thunderbirds) | - | |
| Defenseman of the Year | Dakota Bohn (Binghamton Black Bears) | - | |
| Goaltender of the Year | Mario Cavaliere (Carolina Thunderbirds) | - | |
| Rookie of the Year | Ryan Hunter Columbus River Dragons) | - | |
| Coach of the Year | Gordie Brown (Motor City Rockers) | - | |
| Executive of the Year | Andreas Johansson (Binghamton Black Bears) | - | |
| Broadcaster of the Year | Brooks Hill (Binghamton Black Bears) | - | |
| Founders Award | Dave Jackson (FPHL Director of Player Safety); Cary Ross (Carolina Thunderbirds) | - | |
