= 2026–27 SPHL season =

- League: SPHL
- Sport: Ice hockey
- Duration: TBD

Regular season

Playoffs

SPHL seasons
- ← 2025–26 2027–28 →

The 2026–27 SPHL season is the 23rd season of the SPHL.

== Rule/Playoff Changes ==
Following the annual Board of Governors meeting held June 15-19, 2026 in St. Petersburg, Florida the league announced several changes pertaining to various aspects of the game play.

- The league is adopting a three point system for all games, three points for a win, two points for an overtime or shootout win, one point for an overtime or shootout loss, and no points for a regulation loss.
- Overtime is now a seven minute 3-on-3 period and is still sudden-death.
- The shootout has been reduced from five rounds to three and if still tied it becomes a sudden-death round-by-round shootout. Every eligible player on the roster must take a shot before a player is allowed to shoot a second time (previously, a player could shoot multiple times after the initial round of five shots).
- The President's Cup playoffs will remain with the top eight teams qualifying. However, the quarterfinal round is now a best-of-five series, up from a best-of-three series
- Infractions that involve diving or embellishment by the player that was fouled are now nullified and the embellishment penalty will now be the only penalty assessed.
- In venues where replay is available, a coach’s challenge will be available to each team. If the challenge is unsuccessful, the challenging team will be assessed a minor penalty for delay of game. Each team is permitted one challenge per game. The challenge criteria will remain the same as the referee’s discretionary review:
  - Puck crossing the goal line
  - Puck entering the net using a distinct kicking motion
  - Puck entering the net before the goal frame is dislodged
  - Puck directed, batted, or thrown into the net by an attacking player

== Membership Changes ==
- On September 17, 2025 the league announced the addition of an expansion team to be based out of the new Regions Arena, in Mobile, Alabama which is planned to be opening early in 2027. The team will begin play with the 2027-28 season. On June 16, 2026 the league announced the team name will be the Mobile Mysticks.
- According to an online report, the Athens Rock Lobsters and possibly some other teams southeastern-US based teams in the Federal Prospects Hockey League were looking to join the SPHL for the 2026-27 season. Joining the SPHL was the ownership's original plan for 2025-26.On May 13, 2026 the move to the SPHL was confirmed by that league.
- On May 30, 2026 the SPHL announced the conditional approval for the addition of the Pee Dee Icecats, who were members of the Federal Prospects Hockey League for the 2025-26 season. On June 24, 2026 the team was fully approved for membership.

== Teams ==
Team	City	Arena	Founded	Joined
Athens Rock Lobsters	Akins Ford Arena	Athens, Georgia	2025	2026
Birmingham Bulls	Pelham, Alabama	Pelham Civic Center	2017	
Evansville Thunderbolts	Evansville, Indiana	Ford Center	2016	
Fayetteville Marksmen	Fayetteville, North Carolina	Cumberland County Crown Coliseum	2002	2004
Huntsville Havoc	Huntsville, Alabama	Von Braun Center	2004	
Knoxville Ice Bears	Knoxville, Tennessee	Knoxville Civic Auditorium and Coliseum	2002	2004
Macon Mayhem	Macon, Georgia	Macon Coliseum	2010*	2015
Pee Dee Icecats	Florence, South Carolina	Florence Civic Center	2025	2026
Pensacola Ice Flyers	Pensacola, Florida	Pensacola Bay Center	2009	
Peoria Rivermen	Peoria, Illinois	Carver Arena	2013	
Quad City Storm	Moline, Illinois	TaxSlayer Center	2018*	
Roanoke Rail Yard Dawgs	Roanoke, Virginia	Berglund Center	2009*	

=== Expansion 2027-28 ===
Team	City	Arena	Founded	Joined
Mobile Mysticks	Mobile, Alabama	Regions Arena	2025	2027

== Regular season ==
To be added upon completion of the regular season.

== Playoffs ==
=== Format ===
The top eight teams qualify. As of 2026-27 all rounds are now best-of-five. The playoff champion is awarded the President's Cup.
