= List of professional sports teams in Indiana =

Indiana is the 17th most populated state in the United States and has a rich history of professional sports.

== Active teams ==
=== Major league teams ===
Indiana is home to two major professional sports teams. Both of the teams play in Indianapolis.

American football
League	Team	City	Stadium	Capacity
NFL	Indianapolis Colts	Indianapolis	Lucas Oil Stadium	63,000
Basketball
League	Team	City	Arena	Capacity
NBA	Indiana Pacers	Indianapolis	Gainbridge Fieldhouse	17,274

=== Other professional sports teams ===
==== Men's leagues ====
Arena football
League	Team	City	Arena	Capacity
IFL	Fishers Freight	Fishers	Fishers Event Center	7,500
Baseball
League	Team	City	Stadium	Capacity
IL (AAA)	Indianapolis Indians	Indianapolis	Victory Field	12,230
MWL (High-A)	Fort Wayne TinCaps	Fort Wayne	Parkview Field	6,516
MWL (High-A)	South Bend Cubs	South Bend	Four Winds Field at Coveleski Stadium	5,000
AAPB (Ind.)	Gary SouthShore RailCats	Gary	U.S. Steel Yard	6,139
FL (Ind.)	Evansville Otters	Evansville	Bosse Field	5,181
Basketball
League	Team	City	Arena	Capacity
G-League	Noblesville Boom	Noblesville	Riverview Health Arena at Innovation Mile	3,400
TBL	Hamilton County Huskers	Arcadia	SAC Arena	3,000
TBL	Kokomo BobKats	Kokomo	Memorial Gymnasium	5,200
TBL	Lebanon Leprechauns	Lebanon	The Farmers Bank Fieldhouse	1,000
Ice hockey
League	Team	City	Arena	Capacity
ECHL	Fort Wayne Komets	Fort Wayne	Allen County War Memorial Coliseum	10,480
ECHL	Indy Fuel	Fishers	Fishers Event Center	7,500
FPHL	Indiana Sentinels	Columbus	Hamilton Community Center & Ice Arena	1,150
SPHL	Evansville Thunderbolts	Evansville	Ford Center	9,000
Soccer
League	Team	City	Stadium	Capacity
USLC	Indy Eleven	Indianapolis	Carroll Stadium	10,524
USL1	Fort Wayne FC	Fort Wayne	Fort Wayne FC Park	8,400
Ultimate
League	Team	City	Stadium	Capacity
UFA	Indianapolis AlleyCats	Indianapolis	Kuntz Memorial Soccer Stadium	6,800

==== Women's leagues ====
Basketball
League	Team	City	Arena	Capacity
WNBA	Indiana Fever	Indianapolis	Gainbridge Fieldhouse	17,274
Volleyball
League	Team	City	Arena	Capacity
MLV	Indy Ignite	Fishers	Fishers Event Center	7,500

=== Map of cities with a professional sports team ===
Location with a major professional sports team
Location with a professional sports team

== See also ==
- Sports in Indiana
