= List of professional sports teams in Kansas =

Kansas is the 34th most populated state in the United States and has a rich history of professional sports.

== Active teams ==
=== Major league teams ===
Kansas is home to one major professional sports team. The team is located in Kansas City.

Soccer
League	Team	City	Stadium	Capacity
MLS	Sporting Kansas City	Kansas City	Children's Mercy Park	18,467

=== Other professional sports teams ===
Arena football
League	Team	City	Arena	Capacity
NAL	Salina Liberty	Salina	Tony's Pizza Events Center	7,583
NAL	Southwest Kansas Storm	Dodge City	United Wireless Arena	5,300
Baseball
League	Team	City	Stadium	Capacity
TL (AA)	Wichita Wind Surge	Wichita	Equity Bank Park	12,000
AAPB (Ind.)	Kansas City Monarchs	Kansas City	Legends Field	6,537
PEL (Ind.)	Garden City Wind	Garden City	Clint Lightner Field	1,500
Ice hockey
League	Team	City	Arena	Capacity
ECHL	Wichita Thunder	Wichita	Intrust Bank Arena	13,450
FPHL	Topeka Scarecrows	Topeka	Stormont Vail Events Center	7,773
Soccer
League	Team	City	Stadium	Capacity
WPSL2	FC Wichita	Wichita	Stryker Soccer Complex	6,100

=== Map of cities with a professional sports team ===
Location with a professional sports team

== See also ==
- Sports in Kansas
