= Minnesota Northern Lights =

Future professional minor league hockey team

- City: Thief River Falls, Minnesota
- League: Federal Prospects Hockey League
- Founded: 2026
- Home arena: Ralph Engelstad Arena
- Mascot: Moose
- General manager: Aaron Arlt
- Website: https://mnprohockey.hockeyshift.com

The Minnesota Northern Lights are a minor professional hockey team that joined the Federal Prospects Hockey League (FPHL) during the 2026–27 season with their home games played at Ralph Engelstad Arena in Thief River Falls, Minnesota.

== History ==
On December 18, 2025, the team named Shawn Jones as General Manager.

This decision was later reversed and the team named Aaron Arlt as Jones' replacement.

The Northern Lights played their debut game against the Indiana Sentinels on October 9th, 2026, at the Hamilton Community Center & Ice Arena. The game, and its follow up the following day, both ended in losses for the Northern Lights.

=== Season Record ===
2026-27 Season
| Date | Score | Opposing Team | Home/Away | Notes |
|---|---|---|---|---|
| October 9, 2026 | 2-4 | Indiana Sentinels | Away* | *First game played |
| October 10, 2026 | 2-5 | Indiana Sentinels | Away | |
| October 16, 2026 | TBD | Motor City Rockers | Home* | *First home game |
| October 17, 2026 | TBD | Motor City Rockers | Home | |

== Team name, colors, logo, and mascot ==
Hockey fans and locals were given the opportunity to vote through social media on several team name and logo options. "Minnesota Northern Lights" was chosen as the team name with the most votes. Team colors will be an electric green and vibrant purple with the logo designed as a moose in hockey uniform surrounded by the northern lights. The team's mascot is a purple moose named Twig.
