= Ian White (ice hockey) =

Canadian ice hockey player (born 1984)

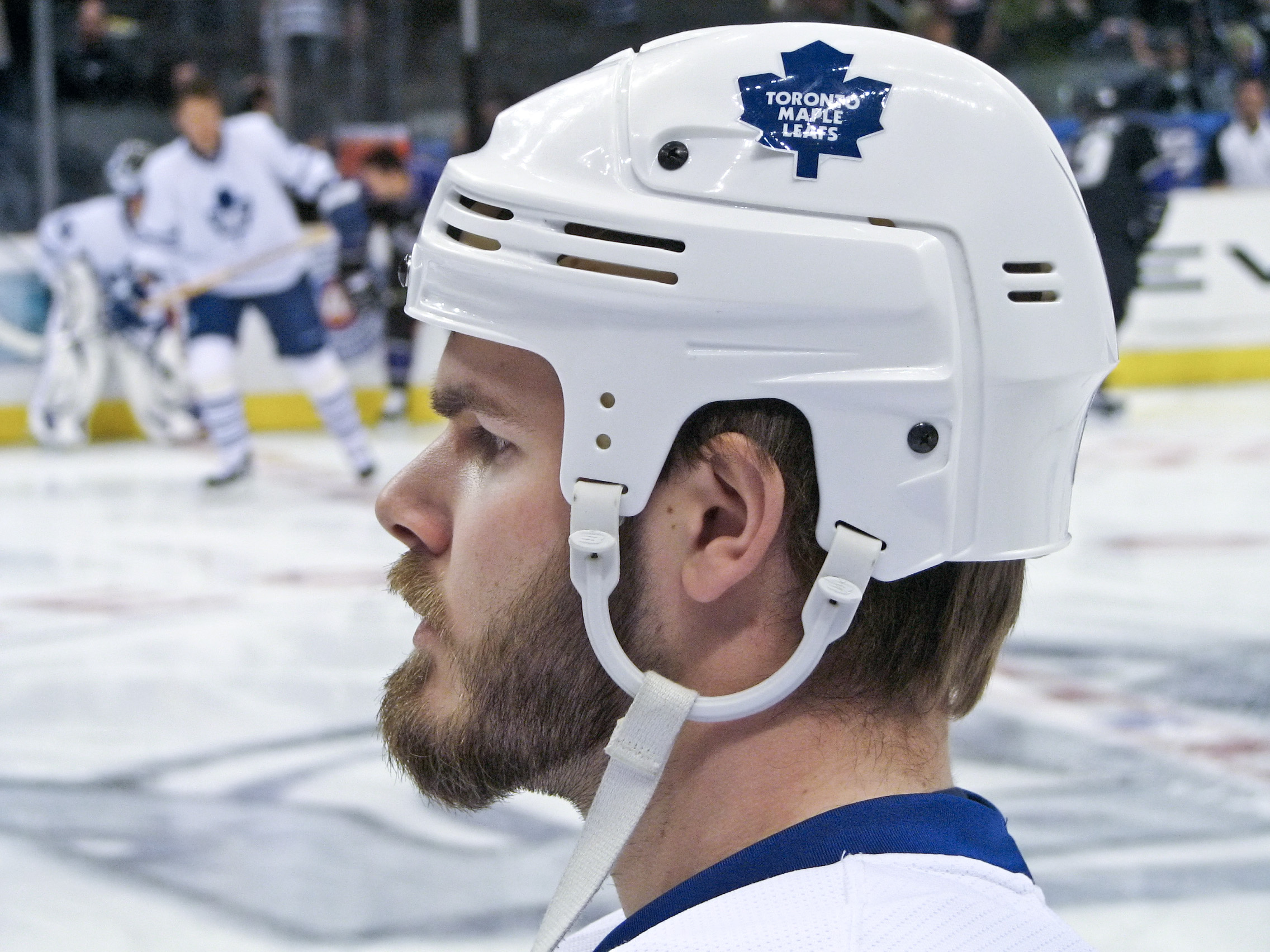
- White with the Toronto Maple Leafs in 2008.
- Born: June 4, 1984 (age 42) Steinbach, Manitoba, Canada
- Height: 5 ft 10 in (178 cm)
- Weight: 185 lb (84 kg; 13 st 3 lb)
- Position: Defence
- Shot: Right
- ECHL team Former teams: Norfolk Admirals; Toronto Maple Leafs; Calgary Flames; Carolina Hurricanes; San Jose Sharks; Detroit Red Wings; Traktor Chelyabinsk; Columbus River Dragons
- National team: Canada
- NHL draft: 191st overall, 2002; Toronto Maple Leafs
- Playing career: 2004–2023

Ian White (born June 4, 1984) is a Canadian former professional ice hockey defenceman who played over 500 games in the National Hockey League. In a career spanning parts of nine seasons, White suited up for the Toronto Maple Leafs, Calgary Flames, Carolina Hurricanes, San Jose Sharks and Detroit Red Wings. White was originally selected in the sixth round, 191st overall in the 2002 NHL Draft. He returned to professional hockey in 2022 with the Columbus River Dragons of the Federal Prospects Hockey League. On October 26, 2022, White was traded to the Motor City Rockers of the Federal Prospects Hockey League. On January 23, 2023, White was signed to a standard player contract with the Norfolk Admirals the ECHL. He was released on November 14, 2023.

== Playing career ==
=== Amateur ===
White was drafted by the Swift Current Broncos of the Western Hockey League (WHL) in the fifth round, 89th overall, in the 1999 WHL Bantam Draft. His first season with Swift Current was fairly successful, as he scored 12 goals and 31 assists in 69 games, which placed him seventh on the team in scoring. The team finished the season first in their division. In White's second season with Swift Current, he fared much better, scoring 32 goals and 47 assists for 79 points in 70 games for second place on the team in scoring. This generated interest amongst NHL teams leading up to the 2002 NHL entry draft, where he was ultimately selected by the Toronto Maple Leafs in the sixth round, 191st overall.

In 2002–03, White finished third on Swift Current in scoring with 24 goals and 44 assists for 68 points in 64 games, and was also named to the WHL's First All Star Team and the CHL's Second All Star Team. He then played for Canada at the 2003 World Junior Ice Hockey Championships in Halifax, Nova Scotia, where Canada finished second place to Russia. White was primarily the seventh defenceman and powerplay specialist for Canada, where he scored two goals and four assists for six points in six games.

The following year, however, White broke his left ankle in late October 2004 and thereby could not be afforded a spot on the 2004 World Junior team.

=== Professional ===
White made his debut with the Toronto Maple Leafs during the 2005–06 season, scoring five points (one goal and four assists) in his first five career NHL games. That same season, White was named to Canada's Spengler Cup squad, which made it into the final against Metallurg Magnitogorsk, losing 8–3. White accumulated one goal in the tournament.

In 2006–07, White scored three goals and 23 assists for a total of 26 points, leaving him tied for second in scoring among rookie defencemen. He spent much of the season playing with the hulking Hal Gill, giving rise to the nickname of "Barney and Fred" due to the almost full foot in height Gill has on White, as well as the massive weight difference.

Due to the high number of defencemen on the roster for the 2008–09 season for the Maple Leafs, White was sat out for the first 11 games of the season before playing his first game, in which he spent some time playing as a third-line forward. In spite of a lack of experience in the position, in eight games there he managed three goals, seven points and a +5 plus-minus rating before returning to defence. As the season progressed, he received more and more ice time, eventually averaging over 25 minutes a game by the end of the year, and finishing the regular season with ten goals, 26 points and a +6 plus-minus.

On January 31, 2010, White was traded, along with Jamal Mayers, Niklas Hagman and Matt Stajan, to the Calgary Flames in exchange for Dion Phaneuf, Fredrik Sjöström and prospect Keith Aulie. White re-signed with the Flames during the off-season on a one-year contract worth $2.99 million, but was traded, along with Brett Sutter, to the Carolina Hurricanes in mid-November in exchange for Tom Kostopoulos and Anton Babchuk. White played in 39 games for the Hurricanes, recording 11 assists before being dealt again three months later, this time to the San Jose Sharks in exchange for a second-round pick in 2012. He recorded an assist in his first game as a Shark and also recorded his first career Stanley Cup playoff point in Game 1 of the 2011 conference quarter-finals against the Los Angeles Kings.

The following summer, White signed a two-year, $5.75 million contract with the Detroit Red Wings, primarily to replace Brian Rafalski who retired after the season. He scored his first goal with Detroit on October 7 during a 5–3 victory over the Ottawa Senators, and finished with 32 points during the 2011–12 season. The following season, shortened because due to the 2012–13 NHL lockout, saw White's role with the Red Wings dramatically reduced; he appeared in only 25 of the team's 48 games and scored only four points. During 2012–13 lockout, White made controversial public comments about NHL Commissioner Gary Bettman, referring to him as "an idiot...[who has] done nothing but damage the game." White later expressed regret for making the remarks.

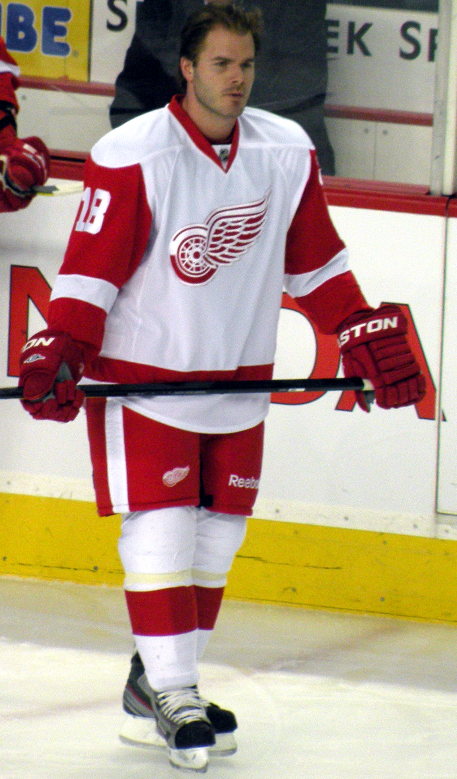
White during his tenure with the Detroit Red Wings

Without a contract for the 2013–14 season, White signed a professional try-out contract with the Winnipeg Jets, but was released prior to the end of training camp. White then played a few games with the Steinbach Huskies senior hockey team before joining Traktor Chelyabinsk in the Kontinental Hockey League (KHL). He played just ten games with Chelyabinsk, registering one assist.

White returned to North America midway into the 2014–15 season and signed a professional try-out contract with the Providence Bruins of the American Hockey League (AHL); however, he was later released by Providence less than a month later. He subsequently joined the Milwaukee Admirals and remained with the team until the end of the season.

On December 30, 2021, the Columbus River Dragons of the Federal Prospects Hockey League announced that they signed White to a contract.

== Legal issues ==
White was arrested and charged for impaired driving twice in 2005 and 2006, and later arrested again by Toronto police for driving while his licence was suspended. On November 20, 2015, he was arrested at his home in Winnipeg, Manitoba and charged with various weapons offences.

== Personal life ==
White is the son of former Steinbach, Manitoba minor hockey coach Allan White, who was Ian's coach and went on to work as a guidance counselor at Steinbach Regional Secondary School.

White has two children with his wife, Tess. The couple separated following the end of his NHL career owing to his difficulties with medication addiction (among others abuse of painkillers during his hockey career). White was temporarily homeless. They are currently estranged.

== Career statistics ==
=== Regular season and playoffs ===
			Regular season					Playoffs
Season	Team	League	GP	G	A	Pts	PIM	GP	G	A	Pts	PIM
1999–2000	Eastman Selects AAA	MMHL	32	29	33	62	36	—	—	—	—	—
1999–2000	Selkirk Steelers	MJHL	3	3	0	3	0	—	—	—	—	—
2000–01	Swift Current Broncos	WHL	69	12	31	43	24	19	1	4	5	6
2001–02	Swift Current Broncos	WHL	70	32	47	79	40	12	4	5	9	12
2002–03	Swift Current Broncos	WHL	64	24	44	68	44	4	0	4	4	0
2003–04	Swift Current Broncos	WHL	43	9	23	32	32	5	1	3	4	8
2003–04	St. John's Maple Leafs	AHL	8	0	4	4	2	—	—	—	—	—
2004–05	St. John's Maple Leafs	AHL	78	4	22	26	54	5	0	2	2	2
2005–06	Toronto Marlies	AHL	59	8	29	37	42	5	1	4	5	4
2005–06	Toronto Maple Leafs	NHL	12	1	5	6	10	—	—	—	—	—
2006–07	Toronto Maple Leafs	NHL	76	3	23	26	40	—	—	—	—	—
2007–08	Toronto Maple Leafs	NHL	81	5	16	21	44	—	—	—	—	—
2008–09	Toronto Maple Leafs	NHL	71	10	16	26	57	—	—	—	—	—
2009–10	Toronto Maple Leafs	NHL	56	9	17	26	39	—	—	—	—	—
2009–10	Calgary Flames	NHL	26	4	8	12	12	—	—	—	—	—
2010–11	Calgary Flames	NHL	16	2	4	6	6	—	—	—	—	—
2010–11	Carolina Hurricanes	NHL	39	0	10	10	12	—	—	—	—	—
2010–11	San Jose Sharks	NHL	23	2	8	10	8	17	1	8	9	8
2011–12	Detroit Red Wings	NHL	77	7	25	32	22	5	1	0	1	0
2012–13	Detroit Red Wings	NHL	25	2	2	4	4	—	—	—	—	—
2013–14	Traktor Chelyabinsk	KHL	10	0	1	1	0	—	—	—	—	—
2014–15	Steinbach Huskies	CSHL	1	0	1	1	0	—	—	—	—	—
2014–15	Providence Bruins	AHL	8	1	3	4	4	—	—	—	—	—
2014–15	Milwaukee Admirals	AHL	34	3	16	19	13	—	—	—	—	—
2017–18	South East Prairie Thunder	AC	—	—	—	—	—	3	0	2	2	0
2021–22	Columbus River Dragons	FPHL	37	6	17	23	12	5	0	0	0	4
2022–23	Motor City Rockers	FPHL	25	4	15	19	6	—	—	—	—	—
2022–23	Norfolk Admirals	ECHL	31	0	14	14	12	—	—	—	—	—
2023–24	Norfolk Admirals	ECHL	8	0	1	1	0	—	—	—	—	—
NHL totals			503	45	134	179	254	22	2	8	10	8

=== International ===
Year	Team	Event	GP	G	A	Pts	PIM
2001	Canada	U18	5	0	1	1	2
2003	Canada	WJC	6	2	4	6	0
2009	Canada	WC	5	1	2	3	0
Junior totals			11	2	5	7	2
Senior totals			5	1	2	3	0

== Honours ==
- 2001–02 – WHL's Most Sportsmanlike Player
- 2001–02 – WHL East Second All-Star Team
- 2002–03 – World Junior Championships silver medal
- 2002–03 – CHL's Second All-Star Team
- 2002–03 – WHL East First All-Star Team
