= Athens Rock Lobsters =

American ice hockey team

- City: Athens, Georgia
- League: SPHL
- Founded: 2024
- Home arena: Akins Ford Arena
- Colors: Crimson, Sapphire, Norfolk Sky, White
- Owners: Barry Cohen and Nancy Peters
- Head coach: Scott Burt
- Website: rocklobstershockey.com

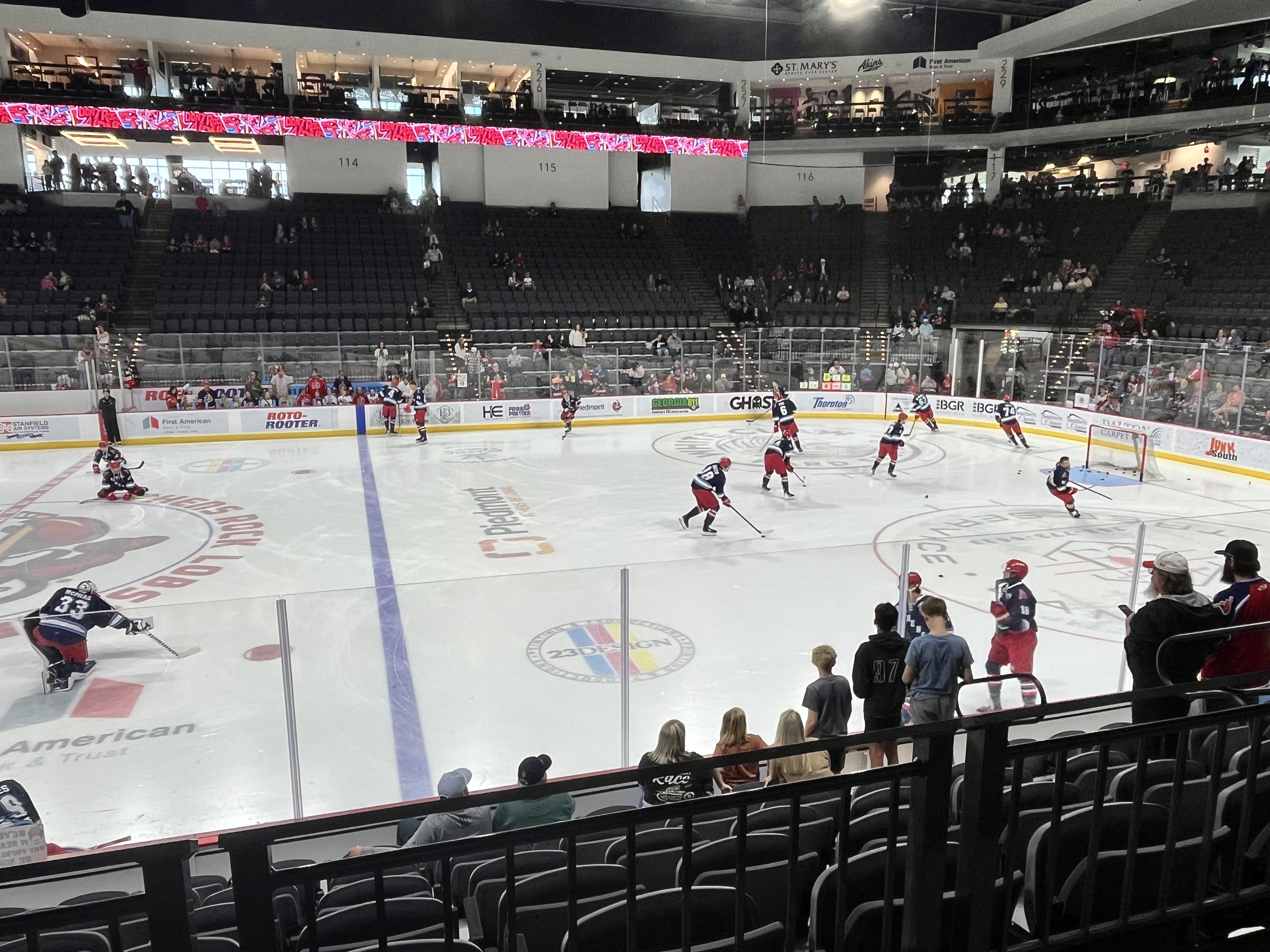
The Athens Rock Lobsters warming up before a game.

The Athens Rock Lobsters are a professional ice hockey team based in Athens, Georgia. Their home is at the Akins Ford Arena and they are a member of the SPHL. Their inaugural season was the 2024–25 FPHL season; however, on May 13, 2026, they announced their move to the SPHL where they will begin play in the 2026-27 SPHL season.

== History ==
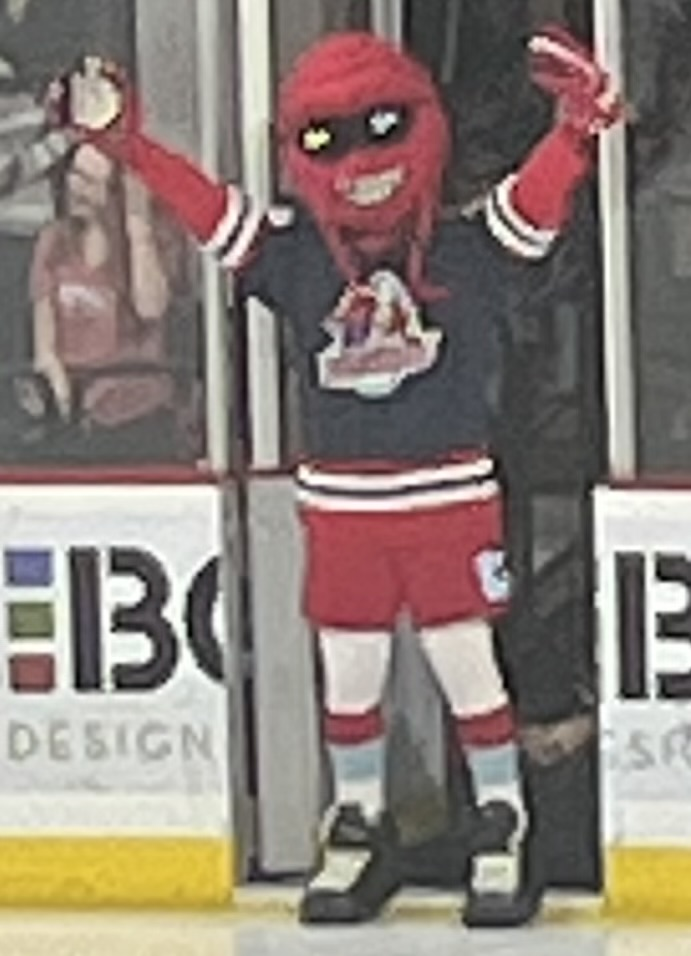
Clawdius, the mascot for the Athens Rock Lobsters.

On March 28, 2024, officials at Athens Pro Hockey and the Classic Center announced that the Federal Prospects Hockey League (FPHL) would expand to Athens and begin play in October, 2024. In May 2024, voters chose the name Rock Lobsters in honor of the debut single, "Rock Lobster", by The B-52s, a new wave band formed in Athens in 1976. On June 27, 2024, Steve Martinson, former head coach of the San Diego Gulls, Rockford IceHogs, Elmira Jackals, Chicago Express, and Allen Americans, was named as head coach.

The mascot, named Clawdius, is a red anthropomorphized lobster wearing a blue shirt, red shorts, and dark sunglasses. The name of the mascot was decided by the results of an online fan poll conducted in October 2024. Clawdius made his first appearance at the game against the Wytheville Blue Ridge Bobcats on February 22, 2025. The team concluded its inaugural season by dropping a three-game Commissioner's Cup Playoff quarterfinal series to the Columbus River Dragons. The FPHL named Steve Martinson its Coach of the Year for the 2024-25 season.

On May 12, 2025, the Allen Americans announced Martinson had rejoined their team as head coach and general manager, leaving those positions vacant with the Rock Lobsters. On June 3, 2025, Garrett Rutledge, former head coach with the Carolina Thunderbirds of the FPHL, and assistant coach with the Saginaw Spirit and Flint Firebirds of the OHL, was named general manager and head coach for the 2025-26 season. After a successful second season in which they clinched the top spot of the Continental division, the Rock Lobsters finished with a 0-2 loss to the Pee Dee IceCats in the playoff quarterfinals. The team announced on April 24, 2026 that it was parting ways with Rutledge.

On May 13, 2026, the Athens Rock Lobsters announced that they would be leaving the Federal Prospects Hockey League and joining the SPHL, citing lower travel costs and higher competition. On May 29th, they revealed Scott Burt, former head coach of the Greensboro Gargoyles in the ECHL, as the new head coach and general manager.

== Season-by-season results ==
| Season | League | GP | W | L | OTL | Pts | GF | GA | PIM | Playoff Result |
|---|---|---|---|---|---|---|---|---|---|---|
| 2024-25 | FPHL | 56 | 43 | 10 | 3 | 121 | 220 | 137 | 1141 | L, 3-2 Columbus River Dragons (Round 1) |
| 2025-26 | FPHL | 56 | 44 | 11 | 1 | 124 | 275 | 180 | 1207 | L, 2-7 Pee Dee IceCats (Round 1) |
