= Jamie Milam =

American ice hockey player (born 1984)

- Born: May 13, 1984 (age 40); Lake Orion, MI, United States
- Height: 6 ft 0 in (183 cm)
- Weight: 200 lb (91 kg; 14 st 4 lb)
- Position: Defense
- Shoots: Right
- team Former teams: Motor City Rockers; Fort Wayne Komets; Gwinnett Gladiators; TOTEMPO HvIK; AIK; Toledo Walleye; HC Thurgau; Bossier-Shreveport Mudbugs; Cardiff Devils; GKS Katowice; Rosenborg IHK; Fife Flyers; HK Nitra; DVTK Jegesmedvék; Wipptal Broncos
- NHL draft: Undrafted
- Playing career: 2006–present

Jamie Milam (born May 13, 1984 in Lake Orion, Michigan) is an American professional ice hockey defenseman. He is currently the Player-Head Coach of the Motor City Rockers of the FPHL he also recently played with the Fort Wayne Komets of the ECHL.

== Playing career ==
Milam spent four seasons at Northern Michigan University before turning professional late in the 2005-06 season with the Fort Wayne Komets of the United Hockey League. He then spent two seasons in the ECHL for the Gwinnett Gladiators before making his first move to the European leagues in 2008, moving to Denmark's Metal Ligaen with TOTEMPO HvIK.

In 2012, Milam moved to the United Kingdom's Elite Ice Hockey League and signed for Welsh side the Cardiff Devils, but departed after just ten games and moved to GKS Katowice in Poland. In 2014, Milan returned to the Elite League, this time signing for Scottish side the Fife Flyers.
