= HC Venom =

- City: Poughkeepsie, New York
- League: Federal Prospects Hockey League
- Division: Empire
- Founded: 2023
- Home arena: McCann Ice Rink
- Owner: PKB LLC
- Head coach: MJ Maerkl
- Website: https://www.hcvenom.com/

Franchise history
- 2023–2024: Elmira River Sharks
- 2024: Hudson Valley Venom
- 2024–2025: HC Venom
- 2025-Present: Pee Dee IceCats

The HC Venom were a professional ice hockey team based in New York. They played at various arenas in the northeast and were a member of the Federal Prospects Hockey League (FPHL). The franchise was founded in 2023 as the Elmira River Sharks, who were then sold and relocated to Hudson Valley in May 2024 as the Hudson Valley Venom, before being sold to PKB LLC, and playing the remainder of the 2024–25 FPHL season in Poughkeepsie.

== History ==
On May 20, 2024, it was announced that the Elmira River Sharks were sold to Pat Manning and relocated to Poughkeepsie, New York as the Hudson Valley Venom. On June 4, 2024, Josh Newberg was named the team's first Head Coach, and MJ Maerkl stayed on as the team's assistant coach, moving over from Elmira. The team also announced they will be playing at IceTime Sports Complex in Newburgh, New York. After a slow start, MJ Maerkl was named team Head Coach on October 30, 2024. The team's game on November 22 vs the Danbury Hat Tricks was postponed due to issues with the IceTime Sports Complex. The team's remaining games at the IceTime Sports complex were all cancelled on Ticketmaster.

On December 9, 2024, it was announced that the Venom were sold to PKB LLC and will be renamed as HC Venom, where they would be playing neutral site games across the northeast, specifically New York state. On January 2, 2025, it was announced that the Venom would be playing their remaining home games at the McCann Ice Rink inside the Mid-Hudson Civic Center.
