= Tri-Cities Opera Company =

The Tri-Cities Opera Company (commonly known as "TCO"), founded in 1949 by Peyton Hibbitt and Carmen Savoca in Binghamton, NY, annually stages four full-scale operas per season, which typically runs from October until May each year. Tri-Cities Opera is notable for its artist training program, and maintains a costume and set rental business to other opera companies for many commonly performed operas.

== General information ==
Tri-Cities opera was founded in 1949 to serve the community of Greater Binghamton in upstate New York. TCO is organized and focused as a training company for younger artists and is partnered in the community with Binghamton University's music department. For productions, TCO uses these resident artists and rarely engages outside performers.

== Resident artist training program ==
Since inception, TCO has had a focus on training young opera singers and has created a Resident Artist program, training young opera singers from around the world. Alumnus of the program have gone on to perform at world-renowned opera companies include The Metropolitan Opera and The San Francisco Opera.

Artists who have studied and performed at TCO include the tenor Plácido Domingo during the 1965–1966 seasons, and many other well-known opera performers.

Resident artists receive instruction at TCO's facilities, main performance space at the Broome County Forum theater and private studios of staff. Skills taught to resident artists include audition skills, acting, stage craft, movement, diction, vocal pedagogy, vocal coaching, and role interpretation.

== Costume and set productions ==
TCO has production sets and costumes for many of the most commonly performed operas. TCO rents these items to numerous other opera companies for their productions. TCO has facility space to produce, store and maintain these items.

== Performance venues ==
TCO maintains facilities on Clinton Street in Binghamton, NY, where it has facilities space for costume design, set production and storage, training and practice facilities for artists, and a small performance theater for various smaller, intimate productions or events.

For full-scale performances, TCO utilizes the Broome County Forum theater, a 1500-seat restored vaudeville facility located in downtown Binghamton, NY.
