= Blizzard Bash =

Demolition derby in Kansas

Blizzard Bash is an annual demolition derby event held in Stormont Vail Events Center in Topeka, Kansas, US. It is the world's largest indoor demolition derby, with over 250 drivers from all over the U.S. and Canada competing in 12 different events. The main event is a four-person team, sixteen team bracket-style tournament team derby, in which the winner is crowned team National Champions. The event occurs over a four-day period in mid-November. There are other modified and stock one heat classes in which drivers compete.

== History ==
The first Blizzard Bash event was held in Lincoln, Nebraska, in 2001 at the Lancaster Event Center. In 2010, the event moved to Topeka. It has gained popularity every year and is known for its hard-hitting, fast-paced action. It was voted as the "best demolition derby in the world" in 2014. In 2015, the event was expanded to take place over a four-day period.

== Attendance and Revenue ==
In 2014, Blizzard Bash brought in more than $840,000 in revenue with over 13,000 in attendance over a three-day period. With the event extended an additional day in 2015, over 18,000 people attended and more than 10,000 watched online via pay-per-view, making it the second largest annual sporting event in the state of Kansas.

== Events ==
- National Championship Team Show: This event is a sixteen team bracket-style tournament, with each team having four drivers. The winning teams compete to make their way through the A-main bracket until they get to the five team feature. The last remaining teams in the feature wins the National Championship. The teams that lost in the first round compete to win the B-main bracket. The first two teams eliminated from the B-main bracket are not guaranteed a spot in the upcoming year's National Championship bracket. The winning team receives a $20,000 grand prize.
- Qualifying Team Championship: The Qualifying Team Championship is a bracket-style tournament of similar format to the National Championship tournament, with up to sixteen teams competing. The top two finishing teams are guaranteed a spot in the upcoming year's National Championship Team Show, plus prize money.
- 80s and Newer Modified: Fifty drivers compete in heats and consolation heats over a three-day period to earn a spot in the twenty-car feature heat. The top five finishers win prize money.
- Other Classes: There are other classes spread out throughout the event, limited to twenty drivers with the top four taking home prize money. They are Old Iron Modified, Old Iron Stock, 80s and Newer Stock, Trucks, Outlaws, Compact Stock, Compact Modified, Youth and Transitions Youth. There is also a Power Wheels event for children, with every competitor receiving a prize.
