= Broome County Forum Theatre =

- U.S. National Register of Historic Places
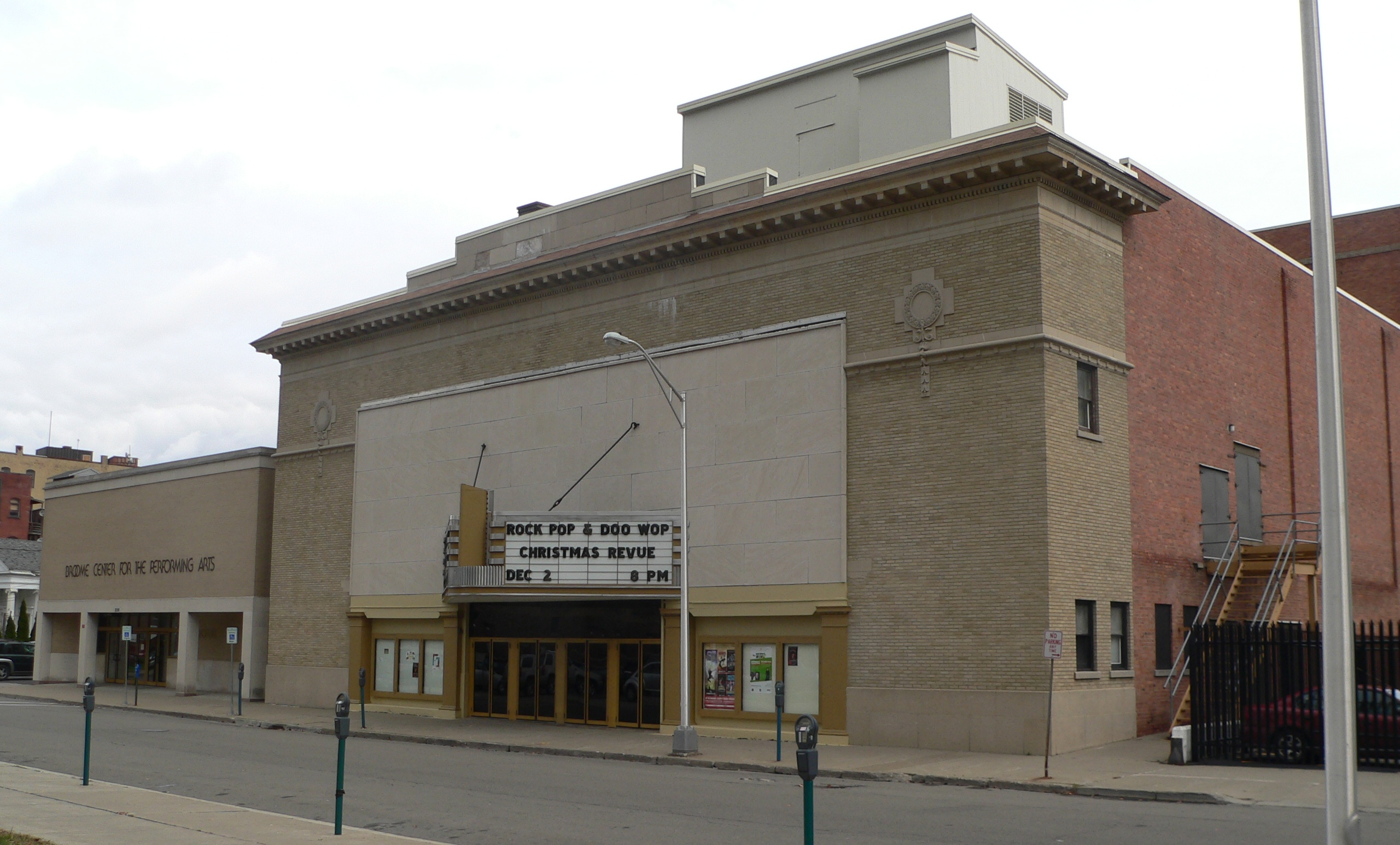
- Binghamton Theatre, seen from the southwest across Washington Street. The 1919 construction is in the right foreground; the 1981 addition is to the left.

- Location within New York Location within the United States
- Location: 236 Washington St., Binghamton, New York
- Coordinates: 42°6′14″N 75°54′44″W
- Area: less than one acre
- Built: 1919
- Architect: Brewster, Herbert
- Architectural style: Late 19th And 20th Century Revivals
- NRHP reference No.: 07001451
- Added to NRHP: January 23, 2008

The Broome County Forum Theatre, also known as the Forum, Capri Theatre, and the Broome Center for the Performing Arts, is a historic theater, which is located at Binghamton in Broome County, New York. The theater seats 1,522 with a pit orchestra and 1,553 without one.

The building consists of two parts: the main, rectangular theater block completed in 1919 and the primary entrance and lobby area constructed in 1981 (non-contributing). The theater block is constructed of brick and cast stone over a concrete basement. It features a theater pipe organ.

The Forum serves as the home performing venue for the Binghamton Philharmonic and the Tri-Cities Opera.

The theatre was listed on the National Register of Historic Places in 2008.
