= Fresno Falcons (FPHL) =

Ice hockey team in Fresno, California

- City: Fresno, California
- League: Federal Prospects Hockey League (2026–present)
- Home arena: Selland Arena
- Head coach: Iain Duncan
- Website: www.fresnofalconshockey.com

The Fresno Falcons are a minor league ice hockey team in the Federal Prospects Hockey League (FPHL). The team started play in the 2026–27 season, adopting similar colors and the logo from the prior ECHL franchise.

== Early history ==
Minor league and senior hockey teams operated in Fresno from the 1940s, culminating in the creation of the Fresno Aces in 1968 in the short-lived Cal-Neva Hockey League. The team was renamed Fresno Falcons for the 1970 season, and played thereafter in several minor leagues, ceasing operations as a member of the ECHL in 2008.

== Season records ==
Season	League	Division	GP	W	L	T	OTL	SOL	PTS	PCT	GF	GA	PIM	Coach(es)	Result
2026–27	FPHL	Frontier												Iain Duncan	
