= Binghamton Black Bears =

Minor professional hockey team

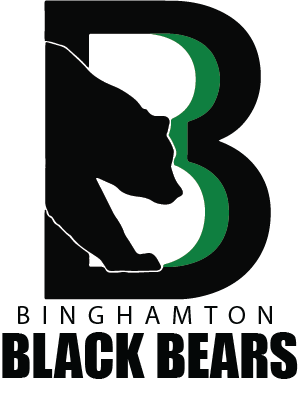
- City: Binghamton, New York
- League: Federal Prospects Hockey League
- Division: Empire
- Founded: 2021
- Home arena: Visions Veterans Memorial Arena
- Colors: Black, green, white
- Owner: Andreas Johansson
- Head coach: Brant Sherwood
- Media: Press & Sun-Bulletin; WENE

Franchise history
- 2021–present: Binghamton Black Bears

Championships
- Regular season titles: 2 (2024-25, 2025-2026)
- Division titles: 3 (2023-24, 2024-25, 2025-2026)
- Playoff championships: 3 (2023-24, 2024-25, 2025-26)

The Binghamton Black Bears are a minor professional hockey team in the Federal Prospects Hockey League (FPHL) based in Binghamton, New York, with home games at Visions Veterans Memorial Arena.

== History ==
A new Federal Prospects Hockey League (FPHL) team owned by Andreas Johansson, the majority owner of the Watertown Wolves, was approved to play at Visions Veterans Memorial Arena in Binghamton, New York, on May 12, 2021.

The team began play in the 2021–22 season, replacing the Binghamton Devils of the American Hockey League (AHL) that had relocated to Utica, New York. Former ECHL player James Henry was initially named the team's first head coach, but he left in August 2021 to join the ECHL's Reading Royals as an assistant coach. Former Danville Dashers and Indianapolis Ice head coach Rod Davidson was then hired to replace Henry. For 2022-23, veteran coach Gary Gill was hired to take over the team as head coach. He left the team in December, at which time Brant Sherwood was hired as interim head coach, and following the 2022–23 season the interim tag was removed.

In late July 2023 prior to the start of the 2023–24 season, the Black Bears announced a lease extension at least through the 2026–27 season. However, the lease allows the team to be replaced if an AHL or higher level professional sports team shows interest in replacing them.

On May 10, 2024, the Binghamton Black Bears won the Commissioner's Cup at home against the Carolina Thunderbirds. They became the third team in league history, and the first since 2013 to sweep the entire playoffs. It also marked the first time in Binghamton's 51 years of minor pro hockey in which a team won a championship on home ice.

== Season-by-season results ==
Regular season										Playoffs		
Season	GP	W	L	OTL	Pts (Note: The FPHL awards 3 points for a regulation time win, 2 points for an overtime win, and 1 point for an overtime or shootout loss)	Pct	GF	GA	PIM	Division Semi Finals	Semifinals	Finals
2021-22	59	32	25	2	94	.531	288	283	1057	L, 2-1 Danbury	—	—
2022-23	56	36	15	5	110	.655	285	195	1422	W, 2-0 Watertown	L, 2-1 Danbury	—
2023-24	56	39	10	7	120	.714	276	170	1502	W, 2-0 Watertown	W, 2-0 Motor City	W, 3-0 Carolina
2024-25	56	49	6	1	143	.851	289	141	1401	W, 2-0 Watertown	W, 2-1 Port Huron	W, 3-0 Carolina
2025-26	56	48	6	2	143	.851	292	126	973	W, 2-0 Topeka	W, 2-1 Port Huron	W, 3-1 Pee Dee
