= Regions Arena =

Indoor under construction arena in Alabama

- Interactive map of Regions Arena
- Address: 401 Civic Center Drive
- Location: Mobile, Alabama, U.S.
- Coordinates: 30°41′12″N 88°2′39″W
- Owner: City of Mobile
- Capacity: Ice hockey: 10,275
- Surface: Ice/Concrete
- Public transit: The Wave

Construction
- Groundbreaking: May 21, 2025
- Built: May 2025 – 2027
- Cost: $300 million
- Architects: Populous; Goodwyn Mills Cawood
- General contractor: B.L. Harbert

Tenant
- Mobile Mysticks (SPHL) (2027–present)

Regions Arena is an indoor arena under construction in Mobile, Alabama that is expected to open in January 2027. Construction began in March 2025 on the former site of the Mobile Civic Center and will have a capacity of 10,275 when complete. The naming rights were purchased by Regions Bank in April 2026 for a 12-year deal worth $15.9 million. The Mobile Mysticks of the SPHL will play in Regions Arena in beginning the fall of 2027.
