= Mobile Mysticks (SPHL) =

- City: Mobile, Alabama
- League: SPHL
- Founded: September 17, 2025; 9 months ago Mobile, Alabama, U.S.
- Home arena: Regions Arena
- Colors: Purple, Green, Gold, White
- Owner: Zawyer Sports & Entertainment
- Website: MysticksHockey.com

The Mobile Mysticks are a planned professional ice hockey team based in Mobile, Alabama. The Mysticks are scheduled to begin play in the SPHL in the 2027–28 season and will be owned and operated by Zawyer Sports & Entertainment. They will play their home games at the new Regions Arena, a downtown venue currently under construction to replace the Mobile Civic Center.

== History ==
Professional hockey in Mobile dates back to the original Mobile Mysticks, who competed in the East Coast Hockey League (now the ECHL) from 1995 to 2002 before ceasing operations and relocating. After more than two decades without a professional team, the SPHL Board of Governors unanimously approved an expansion franchise for Mobile on September 17, 2025.

On June 17, 2026, the team was revealed to be the second incarnation of the Mysticks, with the returning purple, green and gold color scheme and logos modified from the original.

== Ownership and management ==
The Mysticks are owned and operated by Zawyer Sports & Entertainment, a Jacksonville, Florida–based sports ownership and management company founded by CEO Andy Kaufmann. Zawyer Sports & Entertainment owns and operates multiple professional sports franchises across hockey and other sports, including the ECHL's Jacksonville Icemen, Savannah Ghost Pirates, and Greensboro Gargoyles, as well as the American Hockey League's Charlotte Checkers.

== Arena ==
The Mysticks will play home games at the Regions Arena, a new multi‑use facility under construction in downtown Mobile. The arena is expected to seat approximately 10,000 spectators and host a variety of sports, entertainment, and cultural events. The venue's opening is planned for early 2027, ahead of the hockey team's inaugural season.
