= Yack Arena =

Indoor arena in Wyandotte, Michigan

Coordinates: 42.201547°N 83.152636°W

- Interactive map of Yack Arena
- Location: 3131 3rd Street Wyandotte, Michigan United States
- Owner: City of Wyandotte
- Capacity: 3,800 (Ice Hockey)
- Surface: Ice

Tenants
- Motor City Metal Jackets (NAHL) (2009–2011); Motor City Rockers (FPHL) (2026–present)

Benjamin F. Yack Arena is a 3,000-seat indoor arena located in Wyandotte, Michigan, United States. It is used for ice hockey and ice skating, with it being the current home arena of the Motor City Rockers, and was previously home of the Motor City Metal Jackets of the North American Hockey League and the Wyandotte Figure Skating Club. It has open ice available, as well a number of various events throughout the season. The local High School, Roosevelt, hosts their graduation ceremony there every year.

The arena has 25,440 square feet (2,363 m^{2}) of space for trade shows, conventions, festivals, and other special events. One event is the Spring Fling hosted by the Parish of St. Vincent Pallotti.

The Arena was named after Benjamin Yack. He was Wyandotte's first recreational director and was commissioned in 1936. The actual name of the arena was assigned to him in 1969. In addition, he was instrumental in getting the baseball field at Pulaski Park to be lit up with lights in 1939.
