= Selland Arena =

Multi-purpose arena in Fresno, California

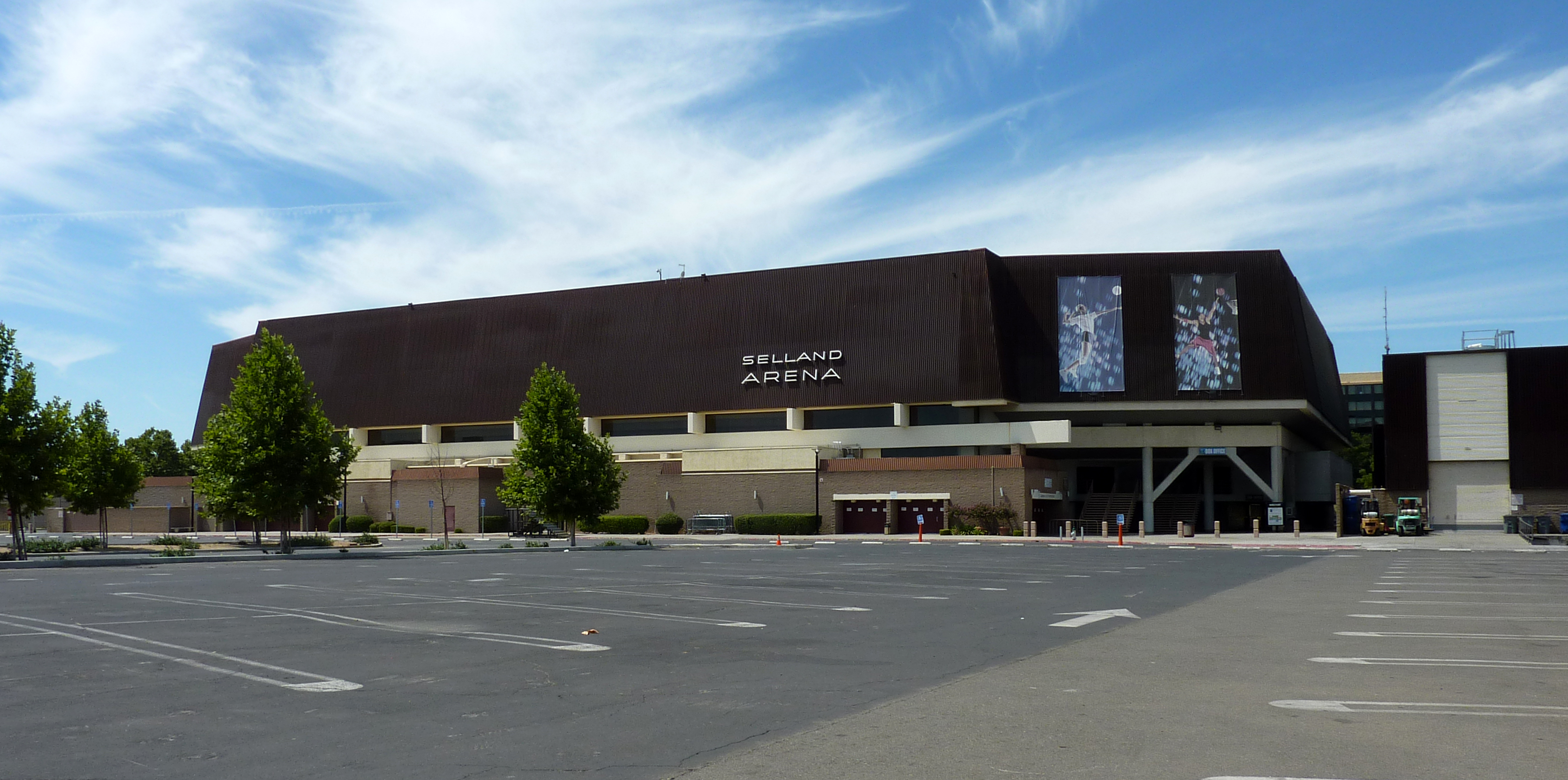
- Interactive map of Selland Arena
- Location: 700 M Street; Fresno, California
- Coordinates: 36.733093°N 119.78271°W
- Owner: City of Fresno
- Operator: VenuWorks
- Capacity: Concerts: 11,300; Basketball: 10,220; Ice Hockey: 7,600
- Surface: Multi-surface
- Field size: 220 by 100 ft (67 by 30 m)

Construction
- Groundbreaking: 1965
- Opened: October 11, 1966
- Renovated: November 2006
- Expanded: 1984
- Cost: $10 million ($99.2 million in 2025 dollars)
- Architects: Robert W. Stevens & Associates

Tenants
- Fresno State Bulldogs men's basketball (NCAA) (1967–2003); Fresno State Bulldogs women's basketball (NCAA) (1971–2003); Fresno Flames (WBL) (1988); Fresno Falcons (WCHL/ECHL) (1995–2003, 2008); Fresno Frenzy (AF2) (2002); Fresno Heatwave (ABA) (2003–2006); Central Valley Coyotes (AF2) (2004–2009); Fresno Monsters (NAHL/WSHL) (2012–2013); Fresno Falcons (FPHL) (2026–present)

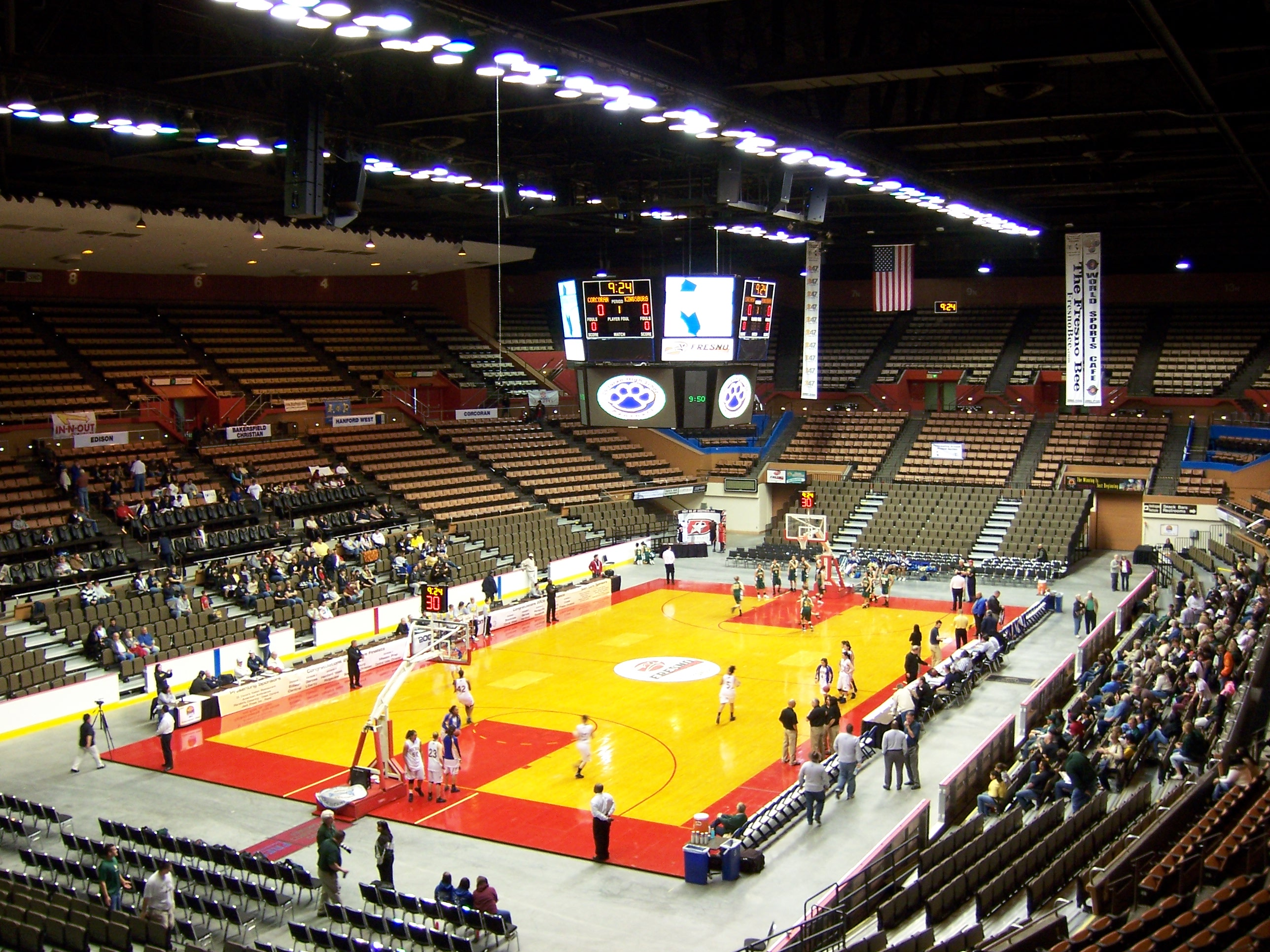
Interior view of Selland Arena during the 2009 California Interscholastic Federation Central Section basketball tournament. Photo features the new scoreboard and new seats installed during renovation.

Selland Arena is a multi-purpose arena built in 1966 that makes up part of a four-venue complex of the Fresno Convention and Entertainment Center in Fresno, California. It is named after former Fresno mayor Arthur L. Selland and has had over 10 million people walk through its doors in its over 50-year history. The arena originally had a 6,582 seating capacity, but a US$10 million expansion project in 1981 increased the seating to its current capacity of 10,132. Before the 1997-1998 Fresno State basketball season, capacity was increased to 10,220. The Selland Arena underwent an additional $15 million renovation in November 2006, that included the installation of new seats, a new video replay scoreboard, message boards and a new ice-cooling system for hockey games.

As of January 11, 2026, the Fresno Convention and Entertainment Center (which includes Selland Arena) is under new management by VenuWorks and ATG Entertainment.

== Tenants ==
The arena was home to the Fresno Monsters junior ice hockey team of the United States Premier Hockey League. On January 27, 2010, the Monsters hockey team agreed to a contract extension to play at the arena through the 2012–13 hockey season. The arena hosted a combined 32 home games between the organization's North American Hockey League (NAHL) and Western States Hockey League (WSHL) teams during the 2012–13 hockey season. After the 2012–13 season, the NAHL Monsters' franchise was relocated to Wenatchee, Washington, to take the place of the original Wenatchee Wild and the Tier III WSHL Monsters began playing at the lower capacity Gateway Ice Center. The WSHL Monsters returned to Selland in 2018 for 21 of their 23 home games in the 2018–19 season and then full-time in the 2019–20 season. The Monsters left the WSHL and joined the USPHL after the 2019–20 season.

== Notable events ==
Selland Arena has hosted concerts, conventions, ice shows, youth sports, professional sports, motocross, rodeo, religious events, graduations, and community events.

Notable events that have taken place at the arena include: the tour opening July 19, 1974 Grateful Dead show, WWF Royal Rumble 1996, Fully Loaded 1998, concerts by many major rock and popular music groups and talents, including Kiss, Deep Purple, Yes, Elvis Presley, Elton John, Metallica, Lynyrd Skynyrd, Aerosmith, Tina Turner, ABBA, David Bowie, Los Bukis, Sammy Hagar, Garth Brooks, and Selena Quintanilla .

Van Halen performed at Selland during its For Unlawful Carnal Knowledge Tour on May 14–15, 1992, and the shows were recorded and later released as a live album, entitled Live: Right Here, Right Now.

It also has hosted the California Interscholastic Federation Central Section Basketball Finals since 2004.

California Future Farmers of America Association hosted its annual State Conference. The last conference was hosted in April 2017. The leadership conference was moved to Anaheim Convention Center for the years 2018 and 2019, and to Sacramento for the years 2020 and 2021, as Selland Arena was too small for it to keep hosting the annual conference.

== See also ==
- Fresno Convention Center
- William Saroyan Theatre
- Valdez Hall
