= Elmira River Sharks =

- City: Elmira, New York
- League: Federal Prospects Hockey League
- Division: Empire
- Founded: 2023
- Home arena: First Arena
- Colors: Red, silver, black, white
- Owner: Federal Prospects Hockey League
- CEO: Don Kirnan
- Head coach: Tyler Gjurich
- Media: WETM

Franchise history
- 2023–2024: Elmira River Sharks
- 2024: Hudson Valley Venom
- 2024–2025: HC Venom
- 2025-Present: Pee Dee IceCats

Playing in the Federal Prospects Hockey League, the Elmira River Sharks were a professional hockey team based in Elmira, New York. First Arena served as the home arena for them.

== History ==
The Elmira Mammoth were founded for the 2022–23 season and were operated by Steve Donner. However, following the 2022–23 season, the Chemung County IDA evicted Mammoth Sports and Entertainment after it was found that they had not paid $250,000 in utility bills. A few weeks later, the FPHL announced Elmira would return for the 2023–24 season with the league owning the team and the Mammoth roster retained by the new team. On June 16, 2023, the FPHL's all-time leading goal scorer, Tyler Gjurich was announced as the first head coach for the new franchise.

On July 8, 2023, the team name was announced as the Elmira River Sharks. A week later, the FPHL and the Chemung County IDA finalized a one-year lease with an option to re-sign following the 2023–24 season. The team was put in limbo when the North American Hockey League announced a new team to play at First Arena, named the Elmira Aviators. On May 16, 2024, it was announced that the team was bought and relocated to another city in New York, which was set to be announced four days later after talks with First Arena for a second season had died down. On May 20, 2024, it was announced that the club was sold and relocated to Poughkeepsie, New York and play at the McCann Ice Arena where they would be named as the Hudson Valley Venom.
