= Ralph Engelstad Arena (Minnesota) =

Indoor arena in Minnesota

- The Mini Ralph, the REA
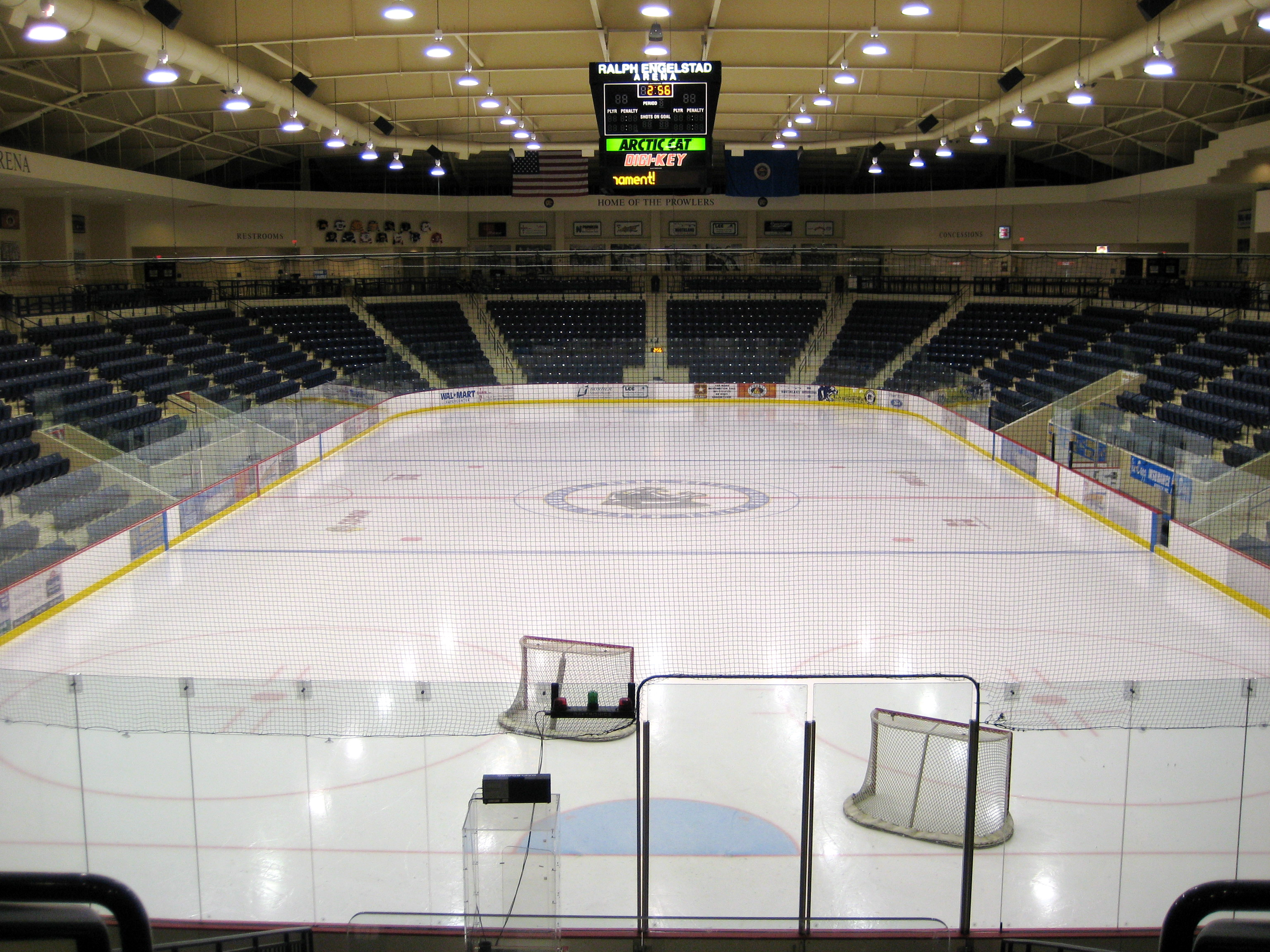
- Interactive map of Ralph Engelstad Arena
- Location: 525 Brooks Avenue North; Thief River Falls, Minnesota 56701
- Coordinates: 48.12159°N 96.19197°W
- Owner: City of Thief River Falls
- Operator: City of Thief River Falls
- Capacity: 3,569
- Surface: 200' x 85' (hockey)
- Field size: 1.05 million sq ft (98,000 m^{2})

Construction
- Opened: November 29, 2003; 22 years ago
- Cost: $15 million
- Architect: Schoen Associates Grand Forks

Tenants
- Thief River Falls Norskies (SIJHL) (2016–2020); Thief River Falls Prowlers (Lincoln High School); Minnesota Northern Lights (FPHL) (2026 onwards)

Ralph Engelstad Arena is an indoor arena located in Thief River Falls, Minnesota. It is used primarily for ice sports, such as hockey, and was built by Jim Kobetsky of Schoen Associates based in Grand Forks, North Dakota. The Venue was the home arena of the Thief River Falls Norskies of the SIJHL and currently the home of the Lincoln High School Prowlers Hockey Programs (often referred to as the 'Thief River Falls Prowlers'). It replaced the older Huck Olson Memorial Arena which was home to the prowlers since 1970.

== History ==
On February 4, 2002, it was announced that Ralph Engelstad and his wife Betty, whom were living in Las Vegas, Nevada at the time, had donated $10 million, which was to be used for a new multi-purpose facility in his hometown of Thief River Falls, Minnesota. The project was approved in a city council meeting on February 12, 2002. Despite the donation, it was clear that additional funds would be needed for the project to come to fruition. Thus, a local fundraising campaign began in September of that year, which raised approximately an extra $3 million, which was enough to finish the project.

The Arena was officially dedicated on November 29, 2003, though Ralph Engelstad did not live to see this, as he died of lung cancer on November 26, 2002 at 72 years old.

In June 2005, the construction of the community room, or "Imperial Room", was completed. In the same year, a basketball floor and arena decking were added. After construction was completed, the Engelstad family donated an additional $13 million.

The arena also hosts regional playoffs for high school basketball, small concerts, large vendor shows, and a rodeo. The Harlem Globetrotters played in 2022 and Priscilla Block performed during the rodeo in 2023.

In November 2025, the Federal Prospects Hockey League (FPHL) announced an expansion team set to play at the facility starting in the 2026–27 season.

== Features ==
- 2,800 theatre-style seats
- 281 bar stools along the perimeter of the bowl
- Two concession stands
- Eight bathrooms
- Weight room
- Hall of Fame section, which includes a bronze statue of Ralph Engelstad from when he played high school hockey at Thief River Falls as a goaltender
