= Visions Veterans Memorial Arena =

Arena in Binghamton, New York

- The Arena - Greater Binghamton's; Premier Events Destination
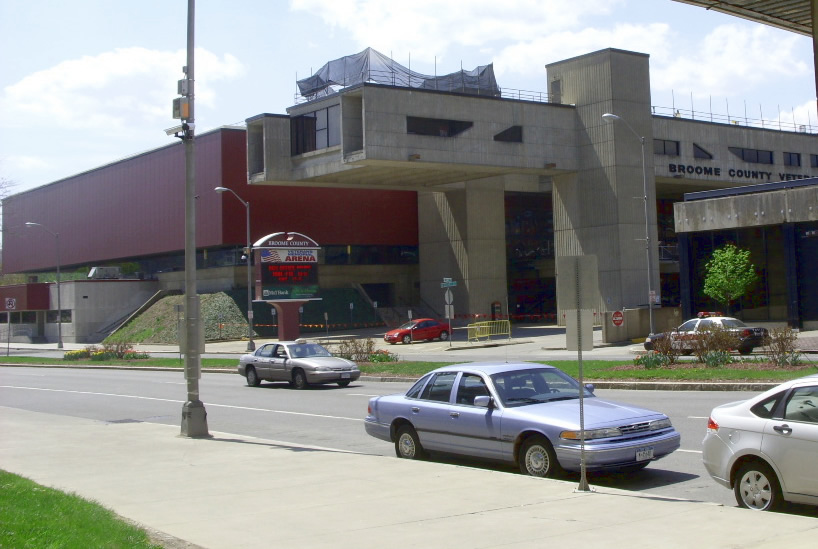

- Location within New York State Location within the United States
- Former names: Broome County Veterans Memorial Arena (1973–2014); Floyd L. Maines Veterans Memorial Arena (2014–2021)
- Location: One Stuart Street; Binghamton, New York 13901
- Coordinates: 42°5′44″N 75°54′47″W
- Owner: Broome County
- Operator: Broome County
- Capacity: 7,200 (concerts); 4,710 (ice hockey)
- Surface: Multi-surface

Construction
- Groundbreaking: June 1971
- Opened: August 29, 1973
- Cost: $7.5 million ($54.4 million in 2025 dollars)
- Architects: Elbasani, Logan & Severin
- Structural engineer: T. Y. Lin & Associates
- General contractor: E. L. Nezelek

Tenants
- Broome Dusters (NAHL) (1973–1977); Binghamton Dusters/Whalers/Rangers (AHL) (1977–1997); B.C. Icemen (UHL) (1997–2002); Binghamton Senators (AHL) (2002–2017); Binghamton Devils (AHL) (2017–2020); Binghamton Black Bears (FPHL) (2021–present)

Visions Veterans Memorial Arena (formerly known as the Broome County Veterans Memorial Arena and Floyd L. Maines Veterans Memorial Arena) is a 7,200-seat multi-purpose arena in Binghamton, New York. The arena was completed in 1973, providing an entertainment venue for residents of the Greater Binghamton area. The arena has eight luxury suites that each hold 25 fans (200 total). A longtime home to minor league hockey, the arena is home to the Binghamton Black Bears of the Federal Prospects Hockey League.

== History ==
In the 1960s, the city of Binghamton started planning a number of urban renewal projects to revitalize the urban core, collectively known as Project 1. Based on the recommendations of a citizen committee, city and county leaders included a proposal as part of Project 1 to construct a downtown cultural complex. The proposed complex would consist of two buildings: a multipurpose veterans memorial auditorium and a performing arts center.

A nationwide design competition for the complex (at the time referred to as the Broome County Cultural Center) was held and Elbasani, Logan & Severin (ELS) were selected as the winners in November 1967. ELS was formed specifically to enter the competition, and it has since become a nationally recognized architectural firm. The winning design placed the arena between State Street and Washington Street, and the performing arts center along the river on Washington Street, with an elevated walkway over Washington Street that would connect the two buildings. The arena plans made use of an innovative space frame based design to avoid view-obstructing columns.

The first (and ultimately only) phase of construction, consisting of the arena and a short part of the elevated walkway, lasted from 1971 to 1973, with the cost coming to $7.5 million at the time (equivalent to $54.4 million in 2025). The arena was built with 17,000 square feet of space on the arena floor, with another 12,000 square feet on the concourse. The first act, the Ringling Bros. and Barnum & Bailey Circus, took place in an unfinished arena in May 1973. Chicago played the arena's first concert (with Bruce Springsteen as opener) on June 13, 1973. The ribbon cutting and first event on ice was the Ice Capades.

The complex's proposed second phase, consisting of the remaining elevated walkway and the riverside performing arts center, was never built due to budgetary issues; the portion of the walkway built during the first phase remains as an extension of the arena. In place of the new performing arts center, the county refurbished and expanded the Capri Theatre, which became the Broome County Forum.

It was announced on August 14, 2020, that the arena would be renamed the Visions Veterans Memorial Arena effective January 1, 2021. Visions Federal Credit Union took over naming rights from the Maines Family who chose not to renew their contract.

== Sports ==
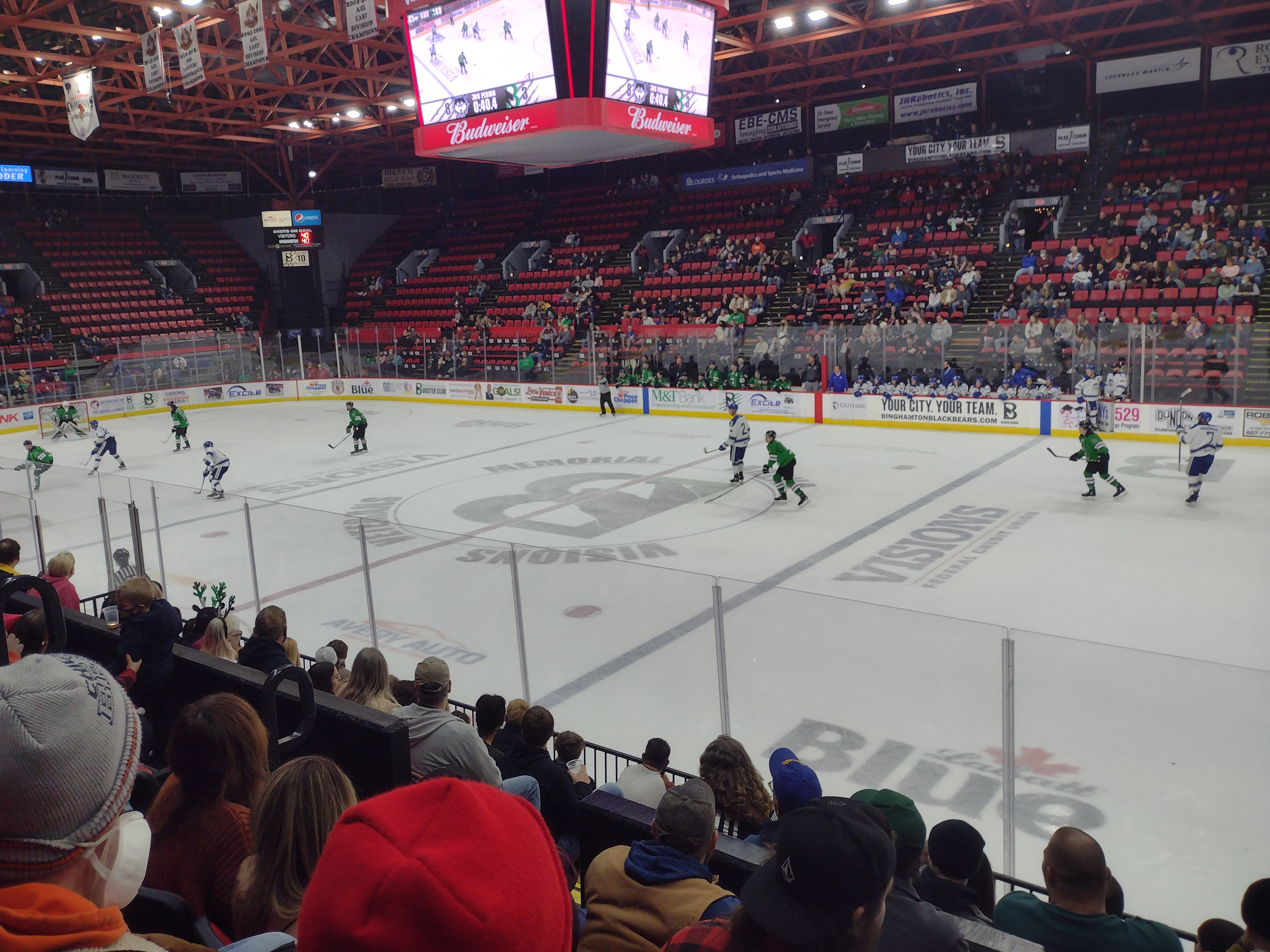
The ice at Broome County Veterans Memorial Arena during a Binghamton Black Bears hockey game in 2021.

The Broome Dusters of the North American Hockey League were the building's first full-time tenant. After a tepid first year of support, the Dusters draw many sellouts, and the community's passion for the team led the Hockey News to declare Binghamton as Hockey Town USA. The Broome Dusters became the Binghamton Dusters in 1977 and moved into the American Hockey League (AHL). The franchise went through a number of name changes, becoming the Whalers and then the Rangers before it relocated to Hartford, Connecticut, in 1997.

The Rangers were replaced by the BC Icemen, of the United Hockey League, for five seasons. The AHL returned in 2002 with the Binghamton Senators, who were affiliated with the Ottawa Senators of the National Hockey League. The arena and the Senators hosted the 2008 AHL All-Star Classic with the skills contest and game broadcast on consecutive nights on live TV across the US and Canada.

In 2017, the Senators were replaced with the New Jersey Devils' affiliate, the Binghamton Devils. In 2020, the B-Devils temporarily relocated to New Jersey during the COVID-19 pandemic causing a disagreement with the arena's operators. The Devils' AHL franchise was then relocated as the Utica Comets before the 2021–22 season. The arena then agreed to a lease with the Federal Prospects Hockey League (FPHL) to add an expansion team called the Binghamton Black Bears for the 2021–22 season.

The New Jersey Nets of the National Basketball Association, and the Hartford Whalers, Washington Capitals, and Ottawa Senators of the National Hockey League have all hosted exhibition games at the arena.

Each December, the arena plays host to the Stop-DWI Holiday Classic, a high school basketball tournament. From 1992 to 2014, the Classic included a national bracket, and was considered to be one of the premiere high school basketball tournaments in the United States. In 2016, the arena hosted the New York State Public High School Athletic Association boys' basketball championship.

== Notable events ==
The arena has hosted notable names in entertainment, including AC/DC, Bob Dylan, Dropkick Murphys, Rod Stewart, B.B. King, Bon Jovi, The Eagles, Kenny Rogers, Aerosmith, Fleetwood Mac, Tom Petty and the Heartbreakers, Rush, Metallica, Van Halen, Def Leppard, Elton John, Keith Sweat, Ringo Starr & His All-Starr Band, Cher, Dolly Parton, Ozzy Osbourne, Grateful Dead, Phish, Metallica, Green Day, Twisted Sister, Stone Temple Pilots, Darius Rucker, Goo Goo Dolls, Carrie Underwood, and Jeff Dunham. Trade shows, the Binghamton Philharmonic, the Harlem Globetrotters, and the Circus all make yearly visits.

Elvis Presley performed back-to-back sold out concerts at the arena, May 26 and 27, just prior to his death in the summer of 1977.

The Grateful Dead performed at the Arena on November 6, 1977, May 9, 1979, and April 12, 1983. The 1977 concert was released in 2018 as Dave's Picks Volume 25.

On November 29, 1984, Kiss performed at the Arena, as part of their Animalize World Tour. It was their last show with lead guitarist Mark St. John, in which he played the entire show. St. John had only played three shows (two in full) with the group, before being permanently replaced by Bruce Kulick.

Phish's December 14, 1995, performance at the arena was released as Live Phish Volume 1 in 2001.

On May 15, 1995 (also the May 22, 1995, episode was taped that same night); April 21, 1997; July 20, 1998; and June 13, 2005, World Wrestling Entertainment brought RAW to the arena. The 1995 episodes were attended by WWE Hall of Fame member Beth Phoenix, who is a native of nearby Elmira, NY and was still attending grade school at Notre Dame High School. This was the first time Phoenix would attend a wrestling event in person and she earned four tickets to the event by winning a coloring contest in a local newspaper. Phoenix would go on to become a multiple time WWE Women's Champion and WWE Divas Champion before becoming a member of the WWE Hall of Fame (Class of 2017) and the wife of fellow WWE superstar Edge. The 1997 episode was the RAW after In Your House 14: Revenge of the 'Taker. The 1998 episode was the RAW before Fully Loaded: In Your House. The 2005 episode was the RAW after the inaugural ECW One Night Stand pay-per-view.

On November 13, 1999, Extreme Championship Wrestling taped an episode of ECW on TNN at the Arena. It aired on November 19, 1999.

On February 1, 2000, World Championship Wrestling taped an episode of WCW Thunder that was aired the following evening.

On March 3, 2012, the Arena was set to host the New York State Section IV Class D Basketball Championship Games. The girls' championship game featured the South Kortright Rams and the Worcester Wolverines, two state ranked teams. However, before the game a transformer outside of the arena malfunctioned, causing the entire arena to lose power. Fans were stranded both inside the concourse, and outside the arena while crews worked to fix the issue. After a two hour delay, power was restored, and the games were played. South Kortright would go onto win the Section IV title by a score of 44-38.

== Binghamton Hockey Hall of Fame ==
The Arena is home to the Binghamton Hockey Hall of Fame, with a display of plaques on the main concourse. Current inductees are:

1998: Ken Holland, Randy MacGregor, Jim Matthews

1999: Rod Bloomfield, Jacques Caron, Paul Stewart

2000: Paul Crowley, Paul Fenton, Larry Pleau

2001: Craig Duncanson, Pierre Laganiere, Brad Shaw

2002: Chris Cichocki, Peter Sidorkiewicz, Ross Yates

2003: Roger Neel, Peter Fiorentino

2004: Peter Laviolette, Jon Smith, Bob Sullivan

2005: Don Biggs, Dallas Gaume, Brad Jones

2006: Ken Gernander, Dave Staffen

2007: Gary Jaquith, Brian McReynolds

2008: AHL All Star Game - No Inductions

2009: Mike Dunham, Glenn Merkosky

2010: Daniel Lacroix, Tom Mitchell

2011: Chris Grenville, Corey Hirsch, John Paddock

2012: Mike Busniuk, Chris Ferraro, Peter Ferraro

2013: Bob Carr, Al Hill

2014: Denis Hamel

2015: Rob Zamuner, Bob Moppert, Scott Allegrino

2016: Richard Grenier, Jean-Yves Roy, Justin Plamondon

2017: Ray Emery, Steve Stirling, Patrick Snyder

2018: Brian McGrattan, Larry Kish

2019: Chris Kelly, Ryan Keller, Grady Whittenburg

2020: No Inductions

2021: No Inductions

2022: No Inductions

2023: Josh Hennessy, Patrice Robitaille, Charlie Jaworski

2024: Kurt Kleinendorst, Stephen "Shimes" Shimer
