= Biloxi Breakers =

- City: Biloxi, Mississippi
- League: Federal Prospects Hockey League
- Division: Continental
- Founded: 2021
- Folded: 2026
- Home arena: Mississippi Coast Coliseum
- Media: WLOX
- Website: https://www.mississippiseawolves.com/

Franchise history
- 2022-2025: Mississippi Sea Wolves
- 2025-2026: Biloxi Breakers

The Biloxi Breakers were a professional hockey team in the FPHL located in Biloxi, Mississippi, from 2021 until the end of the 2025–26 season. The team played its home games at the Mississippi Coast Coliseum and was named the Mississippi Sea Wolves from 2022–25 and were named after a former ECHL team that played in Biloxi from 1996 to 2009.

== History ==
On July 19, 2021, it was announced that the Federal Prospects Hockey League (FPHL) were going to host three neutral site games in Biloxi in order to garner momentum and fan support for a new team. The team would be owned by Barry Soskin with Joe Pace Jr running the operations. Biloxi Pro Hockey sold 20,163 tickets in December 2021 and an announcement was made on December 30 that a new Sea Wolves team would return in 2022 with a multi-year lease agreement to be signed in February. Biloxi Pro Hockey set FPHL attendance records during the neutral site games twice. First with 7,288 fans at the Coast Coliseum on December 17, 2021 and then a sell-out crowd of 8,646 on December 30, 2021.

Mississippi Sea Wolves logo from 2022-24

The new team began play in the 2022–23 FPHL season. On April 27, 2022, the Sea Wolves announced that winningest FPHL head coach Phil Esposito would coach the team for their inaugural season. Following a 2–9–2 start to the season, Esposito was fired on November 28, 2022, and team COO Joe Pace Jr. became the head coach and general manager of the Sea Wolves. The Sea Wolves finished their first season with a record of 17–35–4 and missed the playoffs.

On March 1, 2024, the Sea Wolves changed their name for one night to the Biloxi Bone Crushers.

Mississippi Sea Wolves logo from 2024-2025

On June 3, 2024, the Sea Wolves announced that Ray Tremblay would be the team's fourth head coach, replacing Dustin Skinner. Tremblay stepped down a month later, to be replaced by David Heeps, giving Mississippi their fifth coach in three seasons. Another coaching change came in November 2024, with Heeps being replaced by Rich Parent. Team Captain Justin Barr's number was retired ahead of the team's final home game of the 2024-25 season.

Following the 2024-25 season, it was announced that the team was returning for another season, under new ownership. The team announced that they were going to go with a new name for the 2025-26 season. In May 2025, the names were down to three, the Biloxi Breakers, Gulf Coast Cruisers, and the Mississippi Mosquitos. On June 2, 2025, it was announced that the team's new name would be the Biloxi Breakers. On June 17, 2025, it was announced that former Delaware Thunder captain, and Watertown Wolves Head Coach Charlie Pens Jr was named as the Breakers' new Head Coach and Director of Hockey Operations.

After the end of the 2025-26 season which was marked with declining attendance rates coupled with the product on the ice, the team went virtually radio silent and never officially announced its folding. It was only until the FPHL announced a dispersal draft for the remaining players that gave fans of the team the official declaration.

== Season-by-season results ==
Regular season												Playoffs		
Season	GP	W	L	OTL	Pts (Note: The FHL awards 3 points for a regulation time win, 2 points for an overtime win, and 1 point for an overtime or shootout loss)	Pct	GF	GA	PIM	Finish	Head coach	Quarterfinals	Semifinals	Finals
2022–23	56	17	35	4	51	.304	199	304	1324	5th - Continental Div. 8th - Overall	Phil Esposito (Note: Esposito was fired after 2–9–2 start.); Joe Pace Jr	Did not qualify		
2023–24	56	21	32	3	61	.363	199	265	1412	4th - Continental Div. 8th - Overall	Joe Pace Jr Dustin Skinner (Note: Skinner replaced Pace on February 14th 2024)	L, Columbus, 2-0	N/A	
2024–25	56	11	41	4	36	.214	122	256	1099	7th - Continental Div. 13th - Overall	David Heeps Rich Parent	Did not qualify		
2025-26	56	6	46	2	24	.143	164	326	1306	7th - Continental Div. 14th Overall	Charlie Pens Jr.	Did not qualify		
