= Danbury Hat Tricks =

Professional ice hockey team

- City: Danbury, Connecticut
- League: Federal Prospects Hockey League
- Division: Empire
- Founded: 2019
- Home arena: Danbury Ice Arena
- Owner: DP 110, LLC
- President: Herm Sorcher
- General manager: A.J. Galante
- Head coach: Nick Niedert
- Website: Danbury Hat Tricks

Franchise history
- 2019–present: Danbury Hat Tricks

Championships
- Regular season titles: 1 (2022-23)
- Division titles: 2 (2019-20, 2022-23)
- Playoff championships: 1 (2022-23)

The Danbury Hat Tricks are a professional ice hockey team based in Danbury, Connecticut. The team is a member of the Federal Prospects Hockey League and plays at the Danbury Ice Arena.

== History ==
The Danbury Hat Tricks were announced as a member of the Federal Prospects Hockey League on May 7, 2019. Former FHL player Billy McCreary was announced as general manager and head coach. The team is owned by DP 110 LLC, the same group that recently purchased the Danbury Ice Arena, and would be operated by former Danbury Whalers Managing Partner Herm Sorcher. The first signings by the team were goaltender Jordan Brant and defenseman Kruz Listmayer. Listmayer is the nephew of Hat Tricks' co-owner and former NHL player Colton Orr.

The Hat Tricks are the third FHL/FPHL team to have played in Danbury, the previous being the Whalers and Titans. The five stars in the Hat Tricks' logo refer to the five previous professional teams to have played in the city; the others being the Trashers, Stars and Mad Hatters. Besides the reference to the players that score three goals in a single game, the team's name pays tribute to Danbury being known as "Hat City" due to its history at the center of the American hat industry.

During the team's inaugural season, Danbury was in first place in the Eastern Division when the league cancelled the rest of the season due to the COVID-19 pandemic. McCreary stepped down as head coach after winning Coach of the Year to take the head coaching job with the North American Hockey League's (NAHL) Danbury Jr. Hat Tricks, but kept the general manager position with the FPHL team. Former Maine Mariners assistant coach Anthony Bohn was named head coach.

The team opted out of the 2020–21 season entirely due to capacity restrictions in the arena during the pandemic. Before returning in the 2021–22 season, Bohn left to become the head coach of the NAHL's El Paso Rhinos and the Hat Tricks hired former Danbury Trashers captain Dave MacIsaac as head coach.

In the 2021–22 season, the Hat Tricks were among the league's best, but were swept in the second round by Columbus.

Following the season, McCreary was named Head Coach a second time, while also adding on president of hockey operations, replacing MacIsaac.

In the 2022–23 season, the Hat Tricks won the league's regular season championship, and made it into the team's first Commissioner's Cup finals where they came from behind winning the series 3–2 in five games, and winning on a Michael Marchesan goal at 11:58 of overtime.

On April 12, 2024, in the final regular season home game of the 2023–24 season against the division rivals, the Black Bears, the Hat Tricks became the first team in professional hockey history to have a full African-American starting line-up (goalie included). They would go on to lose the game 4–3 in a shootout. On August 19, 2024, Billy McCreary announced he was leaving the Hat Tricks to join the Kalamazoo Wings as an assistant coach in the ECHL. On September 12, 2024, during a fan event at the Danbury Ice Arena, the Hat Tricks announced their hockey operations staff for the 2024–25 season. Director of Goaltending/Assistant Coach Matt Voity was elevated to General Manager, while team Captain Jonny Ruiz, and Alternate Captain Kyle Gonzalez were named Co-Head Coaches while remaining as active players. Former Danbury Trashers President/General Manager AJ Galante was named Senior Advisor to the General Manager.

On January 17, 2025, the Hat Tricks announced a television broadcast partnership with NY 48 WWON-TV, an internet television station based in Brooklyn, New York, to be streamed at the station's website or at StreamOnABudget Showcase on Roku.

On June 9, 2025, it was announced that former Danbury Whaler, Titan, and Hat Trick goaltender, and Danbury Ring of Honor member Nick Niedert would be named the fourth Head Coach in franchise history.

== Season-by-season results ==
Regular season												Playoffs		
Season	GP	W	L	OTL	Pts (Note: The FHL awards 3 points for a regulation time win, 2 points for an overtime win, and 1 point for an overtime or shootout loss)	Pct	GF	GA	PIM	Finish	Head Coach	Quarterfinals	Semi-Finals	Finals
2019–20	46	31	12	3	94	.681	212	158	809	1st of 5, Eastern 2nd of 10, Overall	Billy McCreary	Season cancelled due to COVID-19 pandemic		
2021-22	61	36	22	3	105	.574	253	232	1168	3rd of 7, Overall	David MacIsaac	W, 2–1, Binghamton	L, 0–2, Columbus	—
2022-23	56	44	7	5	129	.768	251	156	1627	1st of 5, Empire 1st of 10, Overall	Billy McCreary	W, 2–0, Elmira	W, 2–1, Binghamton	W, 3–2, Carolina
2023-24	56	31	19	6	90	.536	216	192	1167	3rd of 5, Empire 5th of 11, Overall	Billy McCreary	L, 2–1, Motor City	—	—
2024-25	56	33	15	8	102	.661	245	191	897	2nd of 7, Empire 4th of 14, Overall	Jonny Ruiz & Kyle Gonzalez (Co-Head Coaches)	L, 2–1, Port Huron	—	—

== Awards ==
Forward of the Year

- 2019–20: Carter Shinkaruk
- 2021–22: Jonny Ruiz
- 2022–23: Jonny Ruiz (All FPHL 2nd Team)

Defenseman of the Year

- 2019–20: Aaron Atwell
- 2021–22: Steve Brown

Goaltender of the Year

- 2019–20: Tom McGuckin
- 2022–23: Brian Wilson

Coach of the Year

- 2019–20: Billy McCreary

Founders' Award

- 2019–20: John Krupinsky
- 2021–22: Billy McCreary
- 2022–23: Dave Smith

Broadcasters of the Year

- 2019–20: Casey Bryant, Jack O'Marra, Zak McGinniss
- 2024-25: Douglas Lattuca

Goaltender of the Month

- February 2019–20: Tom McGuckin
- February 2022–23: Brian Wilson

== Franchise leaders ==
All-time and season leaders as of the 2023–24 season:

All-time regular season

- Games played: Jonny Ruiz, 201
- Goals scored: Jonny Ruiz, 147
- Assists: Jonny Ruiz, 121
- Points: Jonny Ruiz, 268
- Penalty minutes: Daniel Amesbury, 370

All-time postseason

- Games played: Jonny Ruiz, 18
- Goals scored: Jonny Ruiz, 10
- Assists: Lucas Debenedet & Jonny Ruiz, 8
- Points: Jonny Ruiz, 18
- Penalty minutes: Tobias Odjick, 58

Season records

- Goals scored: Jonny Ruiz, 49 (2021–22)
- Assists: Carter Shinkaruk, 38 (2019–20)
- Points: Jonny Ruiz, 85 (2021–22)
- Penalty minutes: Daniel Amesbury, 298 (2022–23)

Postseason records

- Goals scored: Michael Marchesan & Jacob Ratcliffe, 8 (2023)
- Assists: Lucas Debenedet, 8 (2023)
- Points: Michael Marchesan, 13 (2023)
- Penalty minutes: Tobias Odjick, 53 (2023)
