= Topeka Scarecrows (FPHL) =

- City: Topeka, Kansas
- League: Federal Prospects Hockey League
- Division: Empire
- Founded: 2025
- Home arena: Stormont Vail Events Center
- Colors: Black, Burnt Orange
- Owners: Chris Bynarski & Don Lewis
- President: Don Lewis
- Head coach: Robbie Nichols
- Website: topekascarecrows.com

The Topeka Scarecrows are a professional ice hockey team in the Federal Prospects Hockey League (FPHL). Based in Topeka, Kansas, the Scarecrows play their home games at the Stormont Vail Events Center.

Named after the original Topeka ScareCrows, who played in the Central Hockey League and United States Hockey League from 1998 until 2003, the Scarecrows are the first professional hockey team to call Topeka home since the Topeka Tarantulas, who played for only one season in the Central Hockey League in 2004–05. They are the city's first overall hockey team since the North American Hockey League's Topeka RoadRunners (later renamed Topeka Pilots), who played thirteen seasons between 2007 and 2020.

== History ==
On January 7, 2025, the FPHL announced that it would be hosting four neutral-site games in Topeka later that month and into February to attract interest in the community for a future expansion team. Said games featured the Danville Dashers playing as the Topeka Scarecrows and the Port Huron Prowlers playing as the Topeka Roadrunners, paying tribute to the city's previous teams. Because of the success of these four games, averaging over 3,200 fans per game, the FPHL announced on February 13 that Topeka was officially granted an expansion team for the 2025–26 season.

A public contest was held to determine the team's name, with the final five options being the Scarecrows, Tornados, Wizards, Roadrunners and Capitals. On May 5, the team officially announced that they would be known as the Topeka Scarecrows, with Robbie Nichols named as the team's inaugural head coach and veteran defenseman Justin Schmit as their first signed player.
