= Hamilton Community Center & Ice Arena =

Sports facility in Columbus, Indiana, US

Hamilton Community Center and Ice Arena
- Interactive map of Hamilton Community Center and Ice Arena
- Location: Columbus, Indiana
- Coordinates: 39°13′19.71″N 85°53′46.25″W
- Owner: City of Columbus
- Capacity: 1,150
- Surface: Ice

Construction
- Opened: 1958

Tenant
- Indiana Sentinels (FPHL) (2025–present)

Hamilton Community Center & Ice Arena, formerly named Hamilton Ice Arena, is a year-round indoor arena and recreational sport facility in Columbus, Indiana. It features one NHL size sheet of ice for hockey, figure skating, speed skating, broomball, and open skating and one studio size sheet of ice, totalling 17,000 square feet (1,600 m^{2}) of ice. Originally an outdoor facility, Hamilton Ice Arena was designed by Harry Weese and built in 1958.

The building is chalet style, with coarse materials and a triple-beamed roof. In 1975, a continuation of the structures was added to enclose and expand the skating area to a regulation size hockey rink and adjoining practice area. Skaters from beginners to competitive enjoy this top-notch facility. In 2015, Hamilton was renovated to restore some of the original components in a $2.8 million project.

Hamilton Community Center & Ice Arena is currently the home rink for the Columbus Icemen high school hockey team and the Columbus Flames youth hockey teams. Additionally, Lincoln Center Skate Club, Full Throttle Speedskating, Columbus Broomball Association, and Columbus Parks and Recreation use the facility.

In May 2025, a professional ice hockey team, the Indiana Sentinels of the Federal Prospects Hockey League, were announced to begin play in the 2025–26 and would use the Hamilton Ice Arena as their initial home arena with plans to move to a newer, larger arena within 3 years.
