= Blue Ridge Bobcats =

American ice hockey team

- City: Wytheville, Virginia
- League: Federal Prospects Hockey League
- Division: Empire
- Founded: 2023
- Home arena: Hitachi Energy Arena
- Colors: Blue, gold, black
- Owner: Apex Drive Holdings LLC (Chris Bryniarski)
- General manager: Jimmy Milliken
- Head coach: Vojtech Zemlicka
- Website: blueridgebobcats.com

The Blue Ridge Bobcats are a professional ice hockey team based in Wytheville, Virginia. They play at the Hitachi Energy Arena and are a member of the Federal Prospects Hockey League. Their inaugural season was the 2023–24 season.

== History ==
On November 7, 2022, it was announced that the Appalachian Regional Exposition Center (APEX Center) was to host to an expansion Federal Prospects Hockey League team to start in the 2023–24 season and owned by APEX Drive Holdings LLC, which is led by Barry Soskin. On July 27, 2023, the team announced its name, the Blue Ridge Bobcats. Vojtech Zemlicka was named inaugural head coach during the press conference. In December 2023, former President GM of the Carolina Thunderbirds and former VP of Operations of the Binghamton Black Bears, Jimmy Milliken joined the Bobcats as Executive Vice President of Operations. The 2024 season kicked off a new seating alignment where they removed the temporary seating and added new permanent bleachers.

== Season-by-Season Results ==
| Regular season | | | | | | | | | | | | | Playoffs | | |
| Season | GP | W | L | OTL | Pts (Note: The FHL awards 3 points for a regulation time win, 2 points for an overtime win, and 1 point for an overtime or shootout loss) | Pct | GF | GA | PIM | Finish | Head Coach | Wild Card Game | Quarterfinals | Semi-Finals | Finals |
|---|---|---|---|---|---|---|---|---|---|---|---|---|---|---|---|
| 2023–24 | 56 | 16 | 33 | 7 | 50 | .348 | 151 | 221 | 1084 | 6th of 6, Continental 10th of 10, Overall | Vojtech Zemlicka | Missed Playoffs | | | |
| 2024–25 | 56 | 29 | 21 | 6 | 92 | .571 | 194 | 172 | 1033 | 4th of 7, Continental 7th of 14, Overall | Vojtech Zemlicka | W, 5-2 vs Baton Rouge | L, 2-0, Carolina | – | – |
