= Indiana Sentinels =

Ice hockey team of Indiana, US

- City: Columbus, Indiana
- League: Federal Prospects Hockey League
- Division: Empire
- Founded: 2025
- Home arena: Hamilton Community Center & Ice Arena
- Colors: Blue and Gold
- Owner: Ryan Furr
- General manager: Everett Thompson
- Head coach: Everett Thompson
- Website: indianasentinels.hockeyshift.com

The Indiana Sentinels are a professional ice hockey team in the Federal Prospects Hockey League (FPHL) which began play during the 2025–26 season. Based in Columbus, Indiana, the Sentinels play their home games at Hamilton Community Center & Ice Arena; the Sentinels are the first professional hockey team to be located in Columbus, Indiana. The team maintains an affiliation agreement with the Northern Michigan Warhounds of the American Premier Hockey League, a senior ice hockey league.

== History ==
On January 12, 2025, initial plans were announced for the formation of the Indiana Sentinels pending the necessary funding required by the FPHL. The FPHL announced on May 8, 2025, that Columbus was officially granted an expansion team for the 2025–26 season.

On September 12, 2025, former Canadian head coach, Kurt Walsten, was removed from the Indiana Sentinels due to "ongoing visa challenges". This effectively made Jack Hudec become the new head coach for the Sentinels up until his requested release before the season began. With Hudec's release, the Sentinels experienced several coaching changes, including then-Team Chaplain and Doctor, Rick Powell (0–2 record), and Equipment Manager Joey Raab (0–4 record). On October 27, 2025, management announced the signing of Everett Thompson, a former head coach for the Baton Rouge Zydeco.

The team played their first game on October 10, 2025, a 6 to 1 loss to the Topeka Scarecrows, who were also an expansion team for the 2025-2026 FPHL season. Losing their first 6 games in a row by a combined score of 44–10, the Sentinels season did not start off strong. Less than a month into the season, the team experienced a flurry of turmoil, including a series of staff resignations and claims of fraud, and would lose 16 of their first 17 games.

== Season-by-season results ==
Regular season										Playoffs		
Season	GP	W	L	OTL	Pts	Pct	GF	GA	PIM	Division Semi Finals	Semifinals	Finals
2025-26	56	12	37	4	46	.274	136	237	1204	Did not qualify	—	—
