= Stormont Vail Events Center =

Arena in Topeka, Kansas

Coordinates: 39.034136°N 95.685854°W

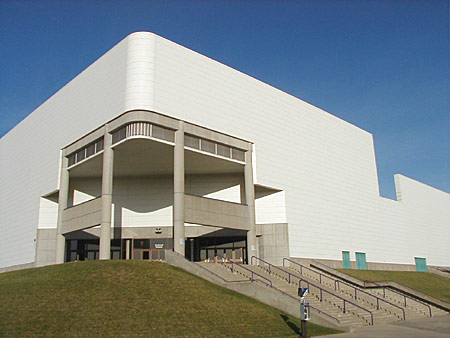

- Location within Kansas Location within the United States
- Former names: Kansas Expocentre
- Location: Topeka, Kansas
- Owner: Shawnee County, Kansas
- Operator: Spectra Venue Management
- Capacity: (Landon Arena): 10,000 (Concerts); 7,773 (ice hockey)

Construction
- Opened: April 17, 1987

The Stormont Vail Events Center, formerly known as Kansas Expocentre, is a 10,000-seat multi-purpose arena built in 1987 in Topeka, Kansas. Many other shows, including concerts, perform here.

The Kansas Expocentre was renamed on June 13, 2019, to the Stormont Vail Events Center after signing a ten-year partnership agreement with Topeka-based Stormont Vail Health.

It has hosted the Kansas State High School Activities Association Class 5A boys and girls state basketball tournaments since its opening, and the KSHSAA Class 5A and 6A volleyball state championships since 1992. The arena also hosts the USA Wrestling Kansas Kids state championship tournament every March.

Landon Arena is the main part of the events center. Other areas include the Exhibition Hall, a building for trade shows, and Domer Arena, a livestock/horse show arena.

== Features ==
Landon Arena contains 7,450 fixed seats, with over 2,550 floor seats. The arena is climate controlled and features computerized lighting, closed circuit TV security, a state-of-the-art sound system, 13-foot (4.0 m) drive-in entrance, plenty of power, and built-in ice capabilities.

== History ==
The 80-acre (320,000 m^{2}) site in the center of Topeka has a long history of use for activities related to agriculture, farming, exhibitions, education and entertainment as the Shawnee County Fairgrounds. The grand opening of the Kansas Expocentre was on April 17, 1987, with a sold-out concert featuring Kenny Rogers, T. Graham Brown, and Ronnie Milsap.

Landon Arena, named for Kansas' elder statesman, governor Alfred M. Landon (1887–1987) was built 1987. To tie the old buildings to the new facilities, an indoor passageway was constructed between the conference center and exhibit hall. It hosted the first Expocentre event with nearly 9,000 people attending a Topeka Sizzlers basketball game.

== Significant events ==
Landon Arena has been the venue for many concerts, family shows, trade shows, consumer shows, horse shows, dog shows and a variety of exhibitions.

- Concert performers have included George Strait, Garth Brooks, Kiss, Bob Dylan, My Chemical Romance, Aerosmith, Heart, Rush, Primus, Cher, Rise Against, Alice Cooper, Carrie Underwood, Little Big Town, Avenged Sevenfold, Buckcherry, Papa Roach, Marilyn Manson, Rob Zombie, Eric Church, and Kansas.
- It has also hosted some wrestling shows such as WCW, WWE Raw, ECW, WWE Friday Night SmackDown, and Total Nonstop Action Wrestling house shows.
- Ice shows include Disney on Ice and High School Musical: The Concert Tour.
- Other Disney shows include Disney Live, Winnie the Pooh, Playhouse Disney Live, and My Little Pony Live.
- The arena also hosts the Arab Shrine Circus each year.
- Blizzard Bash, an annual demolition derby event.
