= Motor City Rockers =

Ice hockey team in Michigan, United States

- City: Wyandotte, Michigan
- League: Federal Prospects Hockey League
- Division: Empire
- Founded: 2020
- Home arena: Yack Arena
- Owner: Ken Andrews
- General manager: Nick Field
- Head coach: Jamie Milam (Player-Coach)
- Website: Motor City Rockers

Franchise history
- 2022–present: Motor City Rockers

The Motor City Rockers are a professional minor league ice hockey team based in Wyandotte, Michigan. The team is the tenth to join the Federal Prospects Hockey League (FPHL). After experiencing delays due to the COVID-19 pandemic, the Rockers played their first game on October 13, 2022.

== History ==
On July 16, 2020, a new FPHL team led by team president Adam Stio was approved to play at the 3,400 seat Fraser Hockeyland for the 2020–21 season. On August 11, the Motor City Rockers were announced by Stio. At this event, Stio also introduced the team's first head coach, Kahlil Thomas. Thomas never coached a game for the Rockers.

The team's first transactions were acquiring Ryan Alves and Tim Santopaolo from the Columbus River Dragons via a trade. The Rockers were originally scheduled to play in 2020, the COVID-19 pandemic cancelled their launch.

On April 29, 2022, general manager Nick Field announced that the Rockers were being revived. The team was allowed to choose twelve athletes from other teams in the Federal Prospects League. In September, the Rockers named Gordie Brown as their head coach. On October 13, the Rockers played their inaugural game in Fraser, Michigan. Prior to the 2024-25 season, the Rockers announced that Brown would be stepping away from the club, only six months after being named coach of the year. Former Motor City Mechanics Head Coach Steve Shannon would take over the club. Shannon only lasted a month, before team captain Jamie Milam would be named Player-Head Coach.

On January 6, 2025, it was announced that Bearcat Hockey Club, a local youth hockey program, led by Mike McCallum and former FPHL player James Ryerse had bought the team, and would keep the team in Fraser. They also announced that they would be dropping the Rockers name, for a new name to be announced during the final regular season game of 2024-25. However, the day after, Ryerse announced that the team will keep the Rockers name and logos for the foreseeable future, while incorporating their Bearcat branding as well. However, a week later, all mentions of Bearcat acquiring the Rockers were removed from their respective sites. On January 24, it was announced that Ken Andrews had bought the team instead of Bearcat. It was also announced that Nick Field would return to the Rockers and be the general manager once again. On May 7, 2025, the Motor City Rockers announced that they had been evicted from Big Boy Arena and would be dormant for the 2025-26 season; the team began looking for a new stadium in the Metro Detroit Area. In May 2026, the team announced that they had found a new home arena, Yack Arena, and would return to the FPHL for the 2026–27 season.

== Season-by-season results ==
Regular season												Playoffs		
Season	GP	W	L	OTL	Pts (Note: The FHL awards 3 points for a regulation time win, 2 points for an overtime win, and 1 point for an overtime or shootout loss)	Pct	GF	GA	PIM	Finish	Head Coach	Quarterfinals	Semi-Finals	Finals
2022-23	56	32	18	6	97	.577	220	198	1267	3rd of 5, Continental 5th of 10, Overall	Gordie Brown	L, 2-0, Columbus	—	—
2023-24	56	33	19	4	97	.577	219	194	1119	2nd of 5, Empire 4th of 11, Overall	Gordie Brown	W, 2-1, Danbury	L, 2-0 Binghamton	—
