= Pee Dee IceCats =

- City: Florence, South Carolina
- League: SPHL
- Founded: 2025
- Home arena: Florence Center
- Owners: Kevin Boggs, Kevin Cuppia, Mike Ronan
- General manager: Gary Graham
- Head coach: Gary Graham
- Website: https://www.peedeeprohockey.com

Franchise history
- 2023–2024: Elmira River Sharks
- 2024: Hudson Valley Venom
- 2024–2025: HC Venom
- 2025–present: Pee Dee IceCats

The Pee Dee IceCats are a professional minor-league hockey team competing in the SPHL and based in Florence, South Carolina. The team was originally formed in the Federal Prospects Hockey League (FPHL) as a relocation of the HC Venom.

The Pee Dee IceCats finished their first and only season in the FPHL with a record of 24-25-5-2-0, 81 points, and a .482 win percentage. That was enough to put them in the playoffs where they went on to sweep the Athens Rock Lobsters in a best-of-3 series for Round 1. They went on to play Columbus River Dragons in Round 2, losing the first game in Florence before winning back-to-back overtime games to advance to the FPHL Finals. In the Finals, they took on Binghamton Black Bears and won the first game before dropping the next 3 straight to have their season come to an end.

They set several attendance records in their only season in the FPHL. These records include an average attendance of 4,763 per game and a total attendance of 133,352 for the regular season. They also had an average attendance of 6,059 for their 4 home playoff games and a total attendance of 24,236 for those playoff games. They set the FPHL single-game attendance record on January 17, 2026 with 7,837 fans in attendance, they also set the FPHL single playoff game attendance record.

On May 30, 2026, after one season in the FPHL, the SPHL announced the IceCats would be leaving the FPHL to join the SPHL.
