= Columbus River Dragons =

- City: Columbus, Georgia
- League: Federal Prospects Hockey League
- Division: Western Conference: Delta Division
- Founded: 2019
- Home arena: Columbus Civic Center
- Colors: Red, black, teal, white
- Owners: Ignite Pro Hockey, LLC
- General manager: Jeff Croop
- Head coach: Jerome Bechard
- Captain: Kirk Underwood
- Website: RDragons.com

Franchise history
- 2019–present: Columbus River Dragons

Championships
- Regular season titles: 2 (2020–21,2023-24)
- Playoff championships: 1 (2021)

The Columbus River Dragons are a professional ice hockey team based in Columbus, Georgia. The team is a member of the Federal Prospects Hockey League and plays at the Columbus Civic Center.

== History ==
In 2017, the Columbus Cottonmouths, a longtime Civic Center tenant, folded after 21 years. This left the Civic Center without a hockey tenant for the first time in its existence. Almost two years later in April 2019, the Columbus city council voted to award a five-year lease to Ignite Pro Hockey, LLC at the Civic Center. On May 21, 2019, it was announced that the Federal Prospects Hockey League (FPHL) had awarded an expansion team to Columbus, Georgia, and would be called the Columbus River Dragons. Due to the onset of the COVID-19 pandemic, the River Dragons' inaugural season was curtailed after the team had clinched the fourth-seeded Western Division playoff position.

Due to the ongoing pandemic, a shortened 2020–21 season was delayed until starting February 19 consisting of four teams: the Carolina Thunderbirds, Columbus River Dragons, Elmira Enforcers, and Port Huron Prowlers, with Carolina playing all games on the road. The league announced an end-of-season tournament, but it would instead be called the Ignite Cup and not the Commissioner's Cup due to the unusual season format. The Ignite Cup consists of a five-game series between the top two teams that had played at least 16 regular season games. Columbus finished with the best regular season record, qualifying to face the second-seeded Elmira Enforcers in the Ignite Cup where they won the league championship three-games-to-none.
