= 2014–15 FHL season =

The 2014–15 Federal Hockey League season was the fifth season of the Federal Hockey League. The Watertown Wolves won the season championship in their first year under new ownership.

== Regular season ==
The FHL awarded a new franchise to play in Southwest Pennsylvania to begin play in the 2014–15 season, named the Southwest Pennsylvania Magic (shortened to SWPA Magic). The Magic were to play at the Rostraver Ice Garden in Belle Vernon, Pennsylvania bringing the league to five teams and a return to Pennsylvania after the folding of the Williamsport Outlaws in the 2012–13 season. In an interview, commissioner Don Kirnan stated he hoped to see as many as seven to eight teams in the FHL by the next season. However, after playing one game in which they lost 10–2 to the Berkshire Battalion, the Magic's membership in the league was revoked due to financial problems. They were replaced, under new ownership, by the Steel City Warriors, continuing to play out of Belle Vernon.

On July 14, 2014, the FHL announced another new franchise to begin play in Berlin, New Hampshire, to be called the Berlin River Drivers. However, on September 8, 2014, the league announced that the league would expand instead into North Adams, Massachusetts, with the Berkshire Battalion, citing the market to be a better fit.

During the previous season, a group of local investors worked to purchase the Watertown Privateers, owned by Don Kirnan. On May 14, 2014, news circulated that the owners group, named Top Shelf Hockey, LLC and led by local businessman Stanley Tibbles, had acquired Kirnan's franchise rights and started a new team named the Watertown Wolves.

On October 30, 2014, it was announced that a neutral site game would take place on January 31, 2015, in Port Huron, Michigan at McMorran Place, with an eye towards future expansion into Port Huron. The Danville Dashers defeated the Danbury Whalers 4 to 1 in the Port Huron game. The attendance at the game was 1,709. The Port Huron Prowlers were announced to begin the following season.

The Watertown Wolves captured first place by the end of regular season and were followed by the Dayton Demonz in second place. The Wolves won the FHL Championship in the playoffs over the Danville Dashers in a five-game series.

== Standings ==
Team	GP	W	L	OTW	OTL	SOL	GF	GA	Pts	Pct
Watertown Wolves	54	32	13	6	3	0	247	185	111	.685
Dayton Demonz	56	33	14	5	4	0	279	174	113	.673
Danville Dashers	56	25	20	6	3	2	238	193	92	.548
Danbury Whalers	54	24	21	3	4	2	204	186	84	.519
Berkshire Battalion	55	23	27	2	2	1	248	243	76	.461
Steel City Warriors*	48	2	43	1	2	0	137	364	10	.069
SWPA Magic^{†}	1	0	1	0	0	0	2	10	0	.000

Advanced to playoffs
* midseason replacement
† folded midseason

== Playoffs ==
Semifinals
1	Watertown Wolves	2
4	Danbury Whalers	1
2	Dayton Demonz	1
3	Danville Dashers	2

Final
1	Watertown Wolves	3
3	Danville Dashers	2
