= Anthony Battaglia (ice hockey) =

American professional ice hockey player

- Born: August 15, 1979 (age 46) Chicago, Illinois, U.S.
- Height: 6 ft 0 in (183 cm)
- Weight: 195 lb (88 kg; 13 st 13 lb)
- Position: Left wing
- Shot: Left
- Played for: Lowell Lock Monsters; Manchester Phoenix
- Playing career: 2002–2014

Anthony Battaglia (born August 15, 1979) is an American professional ice hockey player, who retired in February 2014.

== Early life ==
Battaglia was born in Chicago. His grandfather, Sam Battaglia, was a mobster and member of the Chicago Outfit. After one season of junior hockey playing for the Soo Indians, he played college ice hockey for the Western Michigan Broncos men's ice hockey team. He spent four years at WMU and played in 139 games and scored 47 points in the process.

== Career ==
After college, Battaglia signed the Florida Everblades in the ECHL for the 2002–03 season. He played almost 50 games for the Everblades but managed just 13 points. He also played at the higher AHL level for the Lowell Lock Monsters on nine occasions but failed to score a single point.

For the 2003–04 season, Battaglia would sign for another ECHL organization, the Mississippi Sea Wolves. Battaglia settled well, and in his first season made 67 regular season appearances, scoring 37 points. He was also featured in the post-season and was one of the Sea Wolves' most reliable players, with 6 points in five games. He remained in Mississippi for the 2004–05 season. In 75 games, Battaglia scored 60 points. Battaglia also played with his brother Bates Battaglia, who signed with the Sea Wolves during the 2004–05 NHL lockout. The Sea Wolves suspended operations in the middle of the off-season because of Hurricane Katrina.

Battaglia remained in the ECHL but split the 2005–06 season between the Utah Grizzlies and the Augusta Lynx. Despite the lack of consistency, Battaglia managed to maintain his level of play, and in 72 games for the two teams, scored 54 points. Battaglia would again move teams in the off-season, signing for the Columbia Inferno. He scored 45 points in 47 games, leading to a mid-season move in March 2007 to the Manchester Phoenix. He scored 13 points in the 13 games he was featured in before the season ended. Battaglia returned to North America and re-signed for the Inferno, and once again became an important player for the organization. In March 2008, Battaglia was part of a five-player swap, which sent him again to the Augusta Lynx. On September 4, 2008, his move to the Mississippi Sea Wolves was confirmed. For the 2009–10 season, Battaglia played with the Amarillo Gorillas of the Central Hockey League.

On August 24, 2010, Battaglia signed with the Mississippi RiverKings, to remain in the Central Hockey League. After playing in 16 games with the RiverKings to start the 2010–11 season, Battaglia was released and signed with fellow CHL team the Tulsa Oilers on December 24, 2010. For the 2011–12 season, Battaglia moved to the Federal Hockey League, playing for the New Jersey Outlaws. He followed the franchise to Williamsport, Pennsylvania, for the 2012–13, playing with team until it folded on January 21, 2013. He then joined the Huntsville Havoc of the Southern Professional Hockey League. Battaglia played in the Federal Hockey League for the Dayton Demonz. He ended his career with the Mississippi Surge of the Southern Professional Hockey League and retired on February 18, 2014.

After retiring from hockey, Battaglia has operated a bar and worked as a fireman in Raleigh, North Carolina.

== Personal life ==
Anthony and his brother Bates competed in and won The Amazing Race 22.

== Career statistics ==
			Regular season					Playoffs
Season	Team	League	GP	G	A	Pts	PIM	GP	G	A	Pts	PIM
1997–98	Soo Indians	NAHL	55	9	20	29	55	—	—	—	—	—
1998–99	Western Michigan University	CCHA	33	0	4	4	14	—	—	—	—	—
1999–00	Western Michigan University	CCHA	35	4	8	12	22	—	—	—	—	—
2000–01	Western Michigan University	CCHA	35	3	12	15	8	—	—	—	—	—
2001–02	Western Michigan University	CCHA	36	4	12	16	8	—	—	—	—	—
2002–03	Florida Everblades	ECHL	48	6	7	13	26	—	—	—	—	—
2002–03	Lowell Lock Monsters	AHL	9	0	0	0	0	—	—	—	—	—
2003–04	Mississippi Sea Wolves	ECHL	67	23	14	37	24	5	2	4	6	2
2004–05	Mississippi Sea Wolves	ECHL	71	27	32	59	40	4	0	1	1	4
2005–06	Utah Grizzlies	ECHL	21	7	10	17	14	—	—	—	—	—
2005–06	Augusta Lynx	ECHL	49	12	24	36	46	2	1	0	1	0
2006–07	Manchester Phoenix	EIHL	11	6	6	12	0	2	0	1	1	0
2006–07	Columbia Inferno	ECHL	47	16	29	45	20	—	—	—	—	—
2007–08	Columbia Inferno	ECHL	50	5	17	22	34	—	—	—	—	—
2007–08	Augusta Lynx	ECHL	16	2	8	10	6	5	3	2	5	2
2008–09	Kalamazoo Wings	IHL	61	20	33	53	10	6	0	1	1	0
2009–10	Amarillo Gorillas	CHL	54	13	32	45	24	—	—	—	—	—
2010–11	Mississippi RiverKings	CHL	16	1	3	4	5	—	—	—	—	—
2010–11	Tulsa Oilers	CHL	37	9	24	33	18	4	0	1	1	0
2011–12	New Jersey Outlaws	FHL	46	20	41	61	10	6	2	7	9	0
2012–13	Williamsport Outlaws	FHL	11	10	9	19	12	–	–	–	–	–
2012–13	Huntsville Havoc	SPHL	25	5	9	14	8	8	0	1	1	0
ECHL totals			369	98	141	239	210	16	6	7	13	8
