= 2015–16 FHL season =

- League: Federal Hockey League
- Sport: Ice hockey
- Duration: November 6, 2015 – April 22, 2016
- Season champions: Danbury Titans

Commissioner Cup playoffs
- Finals champions: Port Huron Prowlers
- Runners-up: Danbury Titans

Seasons
- 2014–15 2016–17

The 2015–16 Federal Hockey League season is the sixth season of the Federal Hockey League. The regular season lasted from November 6, 2015 to April 3, 2016. The Port Huron Prowlers would win the league championship by sweeping the Danbury Titans.

== League changes ==
The FHL lost a lawsuit in which the league was ordered to pay former player Kyler Moje a sum of $800,000, after Moje became legally blind due to an injury incurred during a game on February 10, 2012. Without having the finances to pay such a large sum, it was speculated that the league may be forced to fold and reorganize under a different corporate entity. The FHL lost their appeal on the judgment.

On April 2, 2015, the FHL announced an expansion team, the Port Huron Prowlers, to begin play in the 2015–16 season.

On April 3, 2015, the Danbury Ice Arena announced that it did not want to renew its contract with the Danbury Whalers and gave them a notice to evict by April 17, leaving the last remaining team from the inaugural FHL season homeless.

On April 17, 2015, the Steel City Warriors announced that it had suspended operations, stating that the team was unable to find a suitable home arena, but had hopes to return for the 2016–17 season.

On May 20, 2015, the Berlin River Drivers announced their resurrection as the FHL's then seventh team, to play at Notre Dame Arena in Berlin, New Hampshire. A year prior, the River Drivers were slated to join the FHL in 2014–15 before the league reassessed their options and expanded into North Adams, MA instead.

On June 3, 2015, due to the eviction of the Danbury Whalers, the Federal Hockey League announced a new team based in Brewster, New York, to be called the Stateline Whalers, and would play at the Brewster Ice Arena under former the Danbury Whalers CEO and managing partner Herm Sorcher. The Stateline Whalers were announced as being owned by Barry Soskin, who also owns the Port Huron and Danville teams and formerly owned the Dayton Demonz. The Danbury Whalers were officially considered to be on hiatus for the season by the FHL, but gave up their naming and territorial rights to Brewster.

On June 22, 2015, the Watertown Wolves announced that they would suspend operations for the 2015–16 season due to their arena being renovated and an inability to find a temporary arena to use in Northern New York. The Wolves plan to resume operations for the 2016–17 season, after their arena renovations are completed.

On June 26, 2015, the owner of the Berkshire Battalion, William Dadds, announced that he intends to relocate the team from North Adams, Massachusetts, before the 2015–16 season after lease negotiations for the ice rink fell through. The city administration asked the team to only play a maximum of three Friday night games next season and repay all current debts prior to any lease being signed by the city but Dadds decided that the demands were unreasonable.

On June 27, it was reported that the FHL had approved of a new team Danbury, Connecticut, to replace the now departed Whalers. Local businessmen, Bruce Bennett and Edward Crowe were announced as the ownership group. Bennett would announce the new team as the Danbury Titans and had signed a six-year lease to play at the Danbury Ice Arena. On July 15, during the team's inaugural booster club meeting, Danbury Titans ownership confirmed that the league had re-organized and they will own the new Brewster team (formerly announced as the Stateline Whalers); Barry Soskin will continue to own the Danville Dashers and Port Huron Prowlers but no longer be involved in Brewster. On July 18, Bennett announced the team would be called the Brewster Bulldogs and that neither of his teams would be connected to the former Whalers.

On July 15, the Battalion announced via their Facebook page that the team was moving to Dayton, Ohio, to replace the Dayton Demonz. On July 16, the Port Huron Prowlers announced that the protected player list from the Demonz had been transferred to their team and officially announcing the end of the Demonz. In the same press release, the Prowlers also confirmed that Dadds would be relocating the Battalion to Dayton. On July 25, Dadds announced his Dayton team would be called the Dayton Demolition.

On December 23, the Dayton Demolition announced that it had postponed its December 26 game against Danbury due to "scheduling issues" with Hara Arena. On December 28, the Demolition then announced that its new home arena would be South Metro Sports in Centerville, Ohio. After one home game at South Metro in which attendees either sat on bleachers with poor sightlines of the ice or had to stand due to the lack of seating, the Demolition returned to Hara Arena. On January 17, the FHL removed Dadds as owner and on January 19, Joe Pace, Sr., the former coach of the Danville Dashers, was announced as the head of the new ownership group for the Demolition.

== Standings ==
As of April 3, 2016

Team	GP	W	OTW	OTL	L	GF	GA	Pts	Pct
Danbury Titans	57	32	7	4	14	295	198	114	.667
Port Huron Prowlers	55	29	7	1	18	262	218	102	.618
Danville Dashers	56	30	3	7	16	225	185	103	.613
Dayton Demolition	55	19	4	5	27	227	249	70	.424
Brewster Bulldogs	56	13	5	8	30	198	277	57	.339
Berlin River Drivers	55	14	4	5	32	218	298	55	.333

Advance to playoffs

== Playoffs ==
Semifinals (Best of 3)
1	Danbury	2
4	Dayton	0
2	Port Huron	2
3	Danville	1

Final (Best of 5)
1	Danbury	0
2	Port Huron	3
