= Francis Wathier =

Canadian ice hockey player (born 1984)

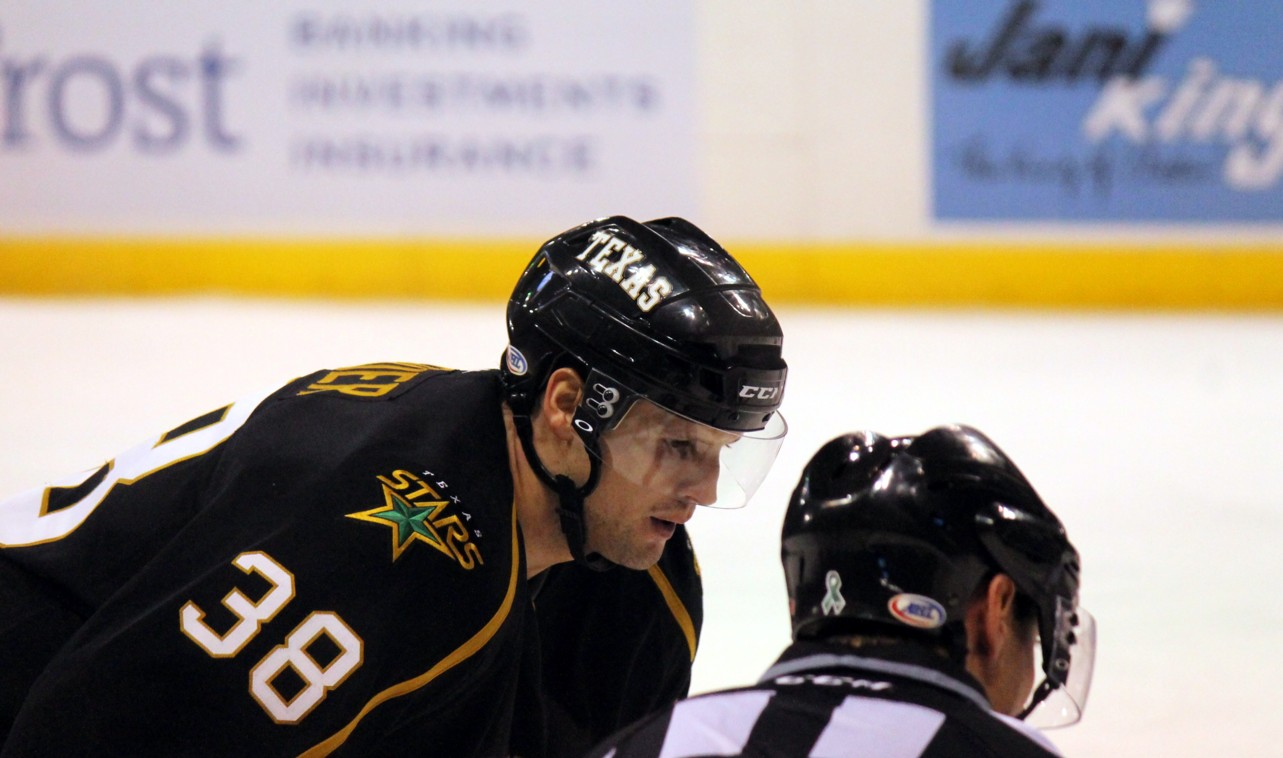
- Born: December 7, 1984 (age 40); St. Isidore, Ontario, Canada
- Height: 6 ft 4 in (193 cm)
- Weight: 225 lb (102 kg; 16 st 1 lb)
- Position: Left wing
- Shot: Left
- Played for: Dallas Stars
- NHL draft: 185th overall, 2003; Dallas Stars
- Playing career: 2005–2015

Francis Wathier (born December 7, 1984) is a Canadian former professional ice hockey left winger.

Wathier was originally drafted by the Dallas Stars and played for their farm team the Texas Stars. He has had three stints with the Dallas Stars, playing in two games in October 2009, three games in February 2010, and one game in the 2011–12 season. In 2011, he was named an AHL All-Star and scored two goals for the Western Conference in an 11–8 loss to the Eastern Conference. On March 9, 2014, Wathier was traded to the Milwaukee Admirals. On October 21, 2014, Wathier was signed to a professional try-out by the Portland Pirates.

== Career statistics ==
			Regular season					Playoffs
Season	Team	League	GP	G	A	Pts	PIM	GP	G	A	Pts	PIM
2001–02	Hull Olympiques	QMJHL	63	1	3	4	68	12	1	2	3	30
2002–03	Hull Olympiques	QMJHL	72	9	18	27	143	12	1	2	3	30
2003–04	Gatineau Olympiques	QMJHL	51	9	16	25	127	15	0	2	2	23
2004–05	Gatineau Olympiques	QMJHL	67	15	20	35	96	10	0	2	2	8
2005–06	Iowa Stars	AHL	11	0	1	1	26	—	—	—	—	—
2006–07	Idaho Steelheads	ECHL	17	4	9	13	31	7	1	1	2	4
2006–07	Iowa Stars	AHL	57	14	3	17	78	12	0	4	4	25
2007–08	Iowa Stars	AHL	19	2	3	5	17	—	—	—	—	—
2008–09	Iowa Chops	AHL	77	6	10	16	127	—	—	—	—	—
2009–10	Texas Stars	AHL	76	19	21	40	101	24	2	6	8	18
2009–10	Dallas Stars	NHL	5	0	0	0	5	—	—	—	—	—
2010–11	Texas Stars	AHL	68	19	16	35	78	6	0	0	0	4
2010–11	Dallas Stars	NHL	3	0	0	0	0	—	—	—	—	—
2011–12	Texas Stars	AHL	75	18	24	42	94	—	—	—	—	—
2011–12	Dallas Stars	NHL	1	0	0	0	0	—	—	—	—	—
2012–13	Texas Stars	AHL	61	4	16	20	77	9	1	0	1	4
2012–13	Dallas Stars	NHL	1	0	0	0	0	—	—	—	—	—
2013–14	Texas Stars	AHL	48	5	4	9	41	—	—	—	—	—
2013–14	Milwaukee Admirals	AHL	17	4	7	11	25	3	0	0	0	6
2014–15	Portland Pirates	AHL	68	5	9	14	53	5	3	0	3	4
2015–16	Laval Prédateurs	LNAH	34	19	14	33	27	13	1	5	6	28
2016–17	Laval Prédateurs	LNAH	40	15	23	38	54	6	0	2	2	11
2017–18	Thetford Assurancia	LNAH	13	6	7	13	18	—	—	—	—	—
2017–18	Watertown Wolves	FPHL	2	0	2	2	4	—	—	—	—	—
2018–19	Thetford Assurancia	LNAH	4	0	2	2	6	9	1	1	2	15
2021–22	Thetford Assurancia	LNAH	5	1	3	4	9	12	2	4	6	2
2021–22	Bytown Royals	EOSHL	1	1	0	1	0	—	—	—	—	—
AHL totals			577	96	114	210	717	59	6	10	16	61
NHL totals			10	0	0	0	5	—	—	—	—	—
