= 2017–18 FHL season =

- League: Federal Hockey League
- Sport: Ice hockey
- Duration: October 20, 2017 – April 7, 2018
- Season champions: Port Huron Prowlers

Commissioner Cup playoffs
- Champions: Watertown Wolves (2nd title)
- Runners-up: Port Huron Prowlers

Seasons
- ← 2016–17 2018–19 →

The 2017–18 Federal Hockey League season was the eighth season of the Federal Hockey League. The regular season ran from October 20, 2017, to April 7, 2018, originally scheduled for 52 games for each of the six teams. The Watertown Wolves won the playoff championship, their second championship in the league.

== League changes ==
The first expansion team of the 2017–18 season was announced in August 2016 as the Carolina Thunderbirds in Winston-Salem, North Carolina.

In February 2017, the FHL announced it was partnering with a developmental league called the International Developmental Hockey League (IDHL) for the 2017–18 season. It was originally intended to be focused on players between the ages of 20 and 23 who had aged out of junior leagues. At one point, the league website listed teams called the Baldwinsville Bandits, Elmira Express, Newark Diamonds, Palmyra Battalion, Syracuse Crush, and Watertown Whalers. The league held a tryout camp on June 15, 2017, for prospective players. However, on June 26, the IDHL then announced it would not play and instead purchased the Watertown Wolves when the team's local ownership group, said to be exhausted from the emotional investment in running a professional sports franchise, backed out.

After making it to the championship in the 2016–17 season, the Berlin River Drivers ceased operations due to the increased overhead costs of running the team and not selling enough season tickets for the following season. The Danbury Titans would also fold for citing overhead costs and specifically workers' compensation insurance in Connecticut.

When the schedule was released for the season, the Fighting Saints were listed with home games in Gravenhurst, Ontario, Témiscaming, Quebec, South River, Ontario, and Kingsville, Ontario. They were eventually announced to have relocated to Kingsville as the North Shore Knights. The North Shore Knights ended up rescheduling or forfeiting many home games after February 11, 2018.

The Cornwall Nationals folded during the season due to lack of funds despite sitting in second place at the time. The Nationals had played 34 games with an 18–13–3 record by their cease of operation on February 20, 2018. The five Nationals' games that were to take place against the Watertown Wolves were replaced by a travel-only team called the Northern Federals, similar to the Delaware Federals of the 2011–12 season. The Federals played the Wolves four times, all loses, including one classified as an exhibition game. All other games were immediately considered forfeits and were cancelled.

== Standings ==
Final standings.

Team	GP	W	L	OTW	OTL	GF	GA	Pts	Pct
Port Huron Prowlers	53	41	7	3	2	246	131	131	.824
Watertown Wolves	52	29	12	6	5	229	163	104	.667
Carolina Thunderbirds	56	25	24	5	2	197	192	87	.518
Cornwall Nationals	46	18	25	0	3	131	132	57	.413
Danville Dashers	56	19	29	3	5	182	193	68	.405
North Shore Knights	44	6	38	0	0	103	248	18	.136
Northern Federals	3	0	3	0	0	8	31	0	.000

Advance to playoffs

== Playoffs ==
Semifinals (Best of 3)
1	Port Huron Prowlers	2
4	Danville Dashers	0
2	Watertown Wolves	2
3	Carolina Thunderbirds	0

Finals
1	Port Huron Prowlers	1
2	Watertown Wolves	3
