= 2010–11 FHL season =

The 2010–11 Federal Hockey League season was the inaugural season of the Federal Hockey League. The Akwesasne Warriors won the season championship.

== Regular season ==
On December 17, the Broome County Barons announced that they would leave Chenango, New York. The team relocated to Cape Cod and resumed play on January 18. The league truncated the original 60-game schedule to less than 50 games in early February. The Rome Frenzy suspended operations shortly thereafter.

Team	GP	W	L	OTL	SOL	GF	GA	Pts
New York Aviators^{†}	47	32	13	2	0	186	132	66
Akwesasne Warriors^{†}	47	30	16	1	0	228	212	61
Thousand Islands Privateers^{†}	44	26	13	5	0	201	153	57
Danbury Whalers^{†}	47	24	18	5	0	184	173	53
Rome Frenzy	46	11	28	7	0	166	246	29
Broome County Barons/Cape Cod Barons	35	10	21	4	0	95	144	24

† Advanced to playoffs

== Playoffs ==
Semifinals
N1	Akwesasne Warriors	3
N2	Thousand Islands Privateers	1
S1	New York Aviators	3
S2	Danbury Whalers	2

Final
N1	Akwesasne Warriors	3
S1	New York Aviators	1
