= Dayton Demolition =

- City: Dayton, Ohio
- League: Federal Hockey League
- Founded: 2014
- Home arena: Hara Arena
- Colors: Red, yellow, and gray
- Owners: Joe Pace, Sr.
- Head coach: Joe Pace, Sr.
- Media: Dayton Daily News
- Website: Demolition website

Franchise history
- 2014–2015: Berkshire Battalion
- 2015–2016: Dayton Demolition

The Dayton Demolition were a minor league professional ice hockey team in the Federal Hockey League based in Dayton, Ohio and played their home games at Hara Arena. The team was known as the Berkshire Battalion in North Adams, Massachusetts before it relocated to Dayton in July 2015 to replace the defunct Dayton Demonz after failing to come to an arena agreement.

== History ==
On June 26, 2015, Bill Dadds announced that he intended to relocate the Battalion from North Adams before the 2015–16 season after lease negotiations for the ice rink fell through. The city administration asked the team to only play a maximum of three Friday night games in next season and repay all current debts prior to any lease being signed by the city but Dadds decided that the demands were unreasonable. On July 15, he announced via his Facebook page that he was moving the team to Dayton, Ohio to replace the Dayton Demonz in Hara Arena. This was confirmed the next day when the Port Huron Prowlers, an expansion team, announced that it had acquired the Demonz's protected players. On July 25, Dadds announced at a press conference held at a local Buffalo Wild Wings that the new Dayton team would be called the Dayton Demolition.

On December 23, the Dayton Demolition announced that it had postponed its December 26 game against Danbury due to "scheduling issues" with Hara Arena. On December 28, the Demolition then announced that its new home arena would be South Metro Sports in nearby Centerville, Ohio. After one home game at South Metro in which attendees either sat on bleachers with poor sightlines of the ice or had to stand due to the lack of seating, the Demolition returned to Hara Arena for the rest of their 2016 home games. On January 17, the FHL removed Dadds as owner and on January 19, Joe Pace, Sr., the former coach of the Danville Dashers, was announced as the head of the new ownership group for the Demolition. In March 2016, The website was moved to "Dayton Pro Hockey" and the FHL began listing the team as "Dayton Pro Hockey" taking further steps to move the team out of the Dadds era.

Dayton would then finish the 2015–16 season in the last qualifying playoff position and faced the Danbury Titans in the semifinals. They were swept by the Titans in a best of three series, all played in Danbury despite Dayton being listed as the "home team" in game one.

On July 13, 2016, the "Dayton Pro Hockey" team announced it would be going dormant for the 2016–17 season. Owner Joe Pace, Sr. claimed that Hara Arena was unable to sign leases to tenants and he did not believe he could put together a team without a proper lead up time and secured arena. He also stated he would look to keep the team in Dayton in 2017 even if Hara Arena is still not available. It was then announced on July 29 that Hara Arena would be closing in August 2016 due to financial difficulties in continued operations and the need for renovation; hence, the arena did not offer a lease to the former Demolition team.

== Season records ==
Season	GP	W	OTW	OTL	L	Pts*	Pct	GF	GA	Regular season finish	Playoffs
2015–16	55	19	4	5	27	70	.424	227	249	4th of 6, FHL	Lost Semifinals, 0–2 vs. Danbury Titans

* – 3 points for a Win, 2 points for an Overtime Win, and 1 point for an Overtime Loss
