= Delaware Federals =

- League: Federal Hockey League
- Founded: 2011; 15 years ago
- Owner: DPHI
- Head coach: Dan Farrell

Franchise history
- 2011–2012: Delaware Federals

The Delaware Federals were a professional ice hockey team that played in the Federal Hockey League. Despite representing Delaware, the team did not have a home arena for games or practices. They were owned by Delaware Pro Hockey International, their head coach was Dan Farrell. They replaced the folded Vermont Wild on the league schedule and played their first competitive game on December 16, 2011, which ended with an 18–0 loss to the Cape Cod Bluefins.

The league would reuse the Federals' name to finish the 2017–18 season for the Northern Federals in games against the Watertown Wolves.

== Season-by-season record ==
Federal Hockey League

Season	GP	W	L	OTL	PTS	GF	GA	PIM	Finish
2011–12	13	3	9	1	9	45	102	260	—
