= 2011–12 FHL season =

The 2011–12 Federal Hockey League season is the second season of the Federal Hockey League.

== Teams ==
	GP	W	L	OTW	OTL	SOL	GF	GA	Pts
New Jersey Outlaws	53	40	9	3	0	1	271	145	127
Thousand Islands Privateers	49	29	15	3	1	1	269	218	95
Danbury Whalers	51	28	20	2	1	0	207	185	89
Brooklyn Aviators	50	25	19	1	4	1	210	175	82
Akwesasne Warriors	45	20	20	4	0	1	250	263	69
Cape Cod Bluefins	51	13	31	3	4	0	193	229	49
Danville Dashers	43	5	34	1	2	1	152	238	20
Vermont Wild	10	2	6	1	0	1	43	65	9
Delaware Federals	9	1	8	0	0	0	28	105	3

== Playoffs ==
=== First round ===
- (1) New Jersey Outlaws - (6) Cape Cod Bluefins 3:0
- (2) Thousand Islands Privateers - (5) Akwesasne Warriors 2:1
- (3) Danbury Whalers - (4) Brooklyn Aviators 2:1

=== Second round ===
- (1) New Jersey Outlaws received a bye to the finals.
- (3) Danbury Whalers - (2) Thousand Islands Privateers 2:0

=== Final ===
- (1) New Jersey Outlaws - (3) Danbury Whalers 3:0
