= 2016–17 FHL season =

- League: Federal Hockey League
- Sport: Ice hockey
- Finals champions: Danville Dashers
- Runners-up: Berlin River Drivers

Seasons
- ← 2015–16 2017–18 →

The 2016–17 Federal Hockey League season is the seventh season of the Federal Hockey League. The regular season ran from October 28, 2016 to April 2, 2017, with an unbalanced 56-game schedule between the seven teams. The Danville Dashers won their first Commissioner's Cup.

== League changes ==
The Watertown Wolves completed renovations to their ice rink and signed a new one-year lease agreement with the city of Watertown in order to return after one season off.

In May 2016, the league expanded to St. Clair Shores, Michigan (Metro Detroit), with the new St. Clair Shores Fighting Saints, playing out of the St. Clair Shores Civic Arena.

On July 13, 2016, the "Dayton Pro Hockey" team, formerly known as the Dayton Demolition before removing references to the Demolition name in March 2016, announced it would go dormant for the 2016–17 season. Owner Joe Pace, Sr. claimed that Hara Arena could not sign leases to tenants and he did not believe he could put together a team without a proper lead up time and secured arena. He also stated he would look to keep the team in Dayton in 2017 even if Hara Arena is still not available. Hara Arena would end up closing permanently in August 2016.

In June 2016, Brewster Bulldogs owner, Bruce Bennett mentioned to The News-Times that he would solely focus on his Danbury Titans team and would no longer be involved with the Bulldogs. Without finding new ownership, Bennett decided to suspend Bulldogs operations on July 14, 2016.

On September 14, the city of Cornwall, Ontario, approved a team called the Cornwall Nationals to begin play for the 2016–17 season out of the Ed Lumley Arena. On September 16, the FHL approved of the addition to the league for the upcoming season. The new team replaced the recently folded Cornwall River Kings and led by Mitch Gagne and Rodney Rivette. Midway through their first season, Rivette bought out Gagne's share of the team and Gagne left his position of general manager on 18 December. On December 21, the Nationals announced that it had secured another local investor, Will Beauvais, to help support the team, while Nationals forward, Basem Awwad, also took over general manager duties at that time.

== Standings ==
Final standings

Team	GP	W	L	OTW	OTL	GF	GA	Pts	Pct
Danville Dashers	56	36	9	4	4	229	121	129	.768
Berlin River Drivers	56	28	21	3	4	236	195	94	.560
Danbury Titans	56	26	22	7	1	206	182	93	.554
Watertown Wolves	56	27	23	2	4	192	186	89	.530
Port Huron Prowlers	56	23	21	3	9	224	213	84	.500
Cornwall Nationals	57	16	34	4	3	202	265	59	.345
St. Clair Shores Fighting Saints	55	11	40	3	1	142	260	40	.242

Advance to playoffs

== Playoffs ==
Semifinals (Best of 3)
1	Danville	2
4	Watertown	1
2	Berlin River	2
3	Danbury	0

Final (Best of 5)
1	Danville	3
2	Berlin	2
