= Green Mountain Arena =

Hockey arena in Vermont, U.S.

Coordinates: 44°34′4″N 72°36′34″W

- Interactive map of Green Mountain Arena
- Location: 704 Bridge Street Morrisville, Vermont 05661
- Capacity: 1,000

Tenants
- Peoples Academy Wolves (VPA); Vermont Wild (FHL) (2011)

The Green Mountain Arena was a 1,000-seat multi-purpose arena in Morrisville, Vermont. It was home to the Peoples Academy High School Wolves varsity hockey team and the Lamoille Area Hockey Association. In the fall of 2011, it was home to the short lived Vermont Wild of the Federal Hockey League. The arena closed in March 2013 and the building was repurposed as a warehouse, with ice hockey operations moving to the new Stowe Arena in nearby Stowe, Vermont and Ice Haus Arena at Jay Peak Resort.

The arena was built in 2003 as the CREW (Community, Recreation, Exercise, Wellness) Arena and operated as a nonprofit organization. Amid financial hardship, the arena was sold in 2009 to Latona Sports Management Group of Massachusetts, who reopened it as Green Mountain Arena. By early 2013, Latona was unable to maintain the facility and began looking for a purchaser. It was considered as an alternative to the planned new Stowe Arena, but the Town of Stowe passed a bond for Stowe Arena and began construction, and Latona sold the Green Mountain Arena as an industrial lot.
