= Bonnie Castle Recreation Center =

Ice rink in Alexandria Bay, New York, U.S

Coordinates: 44°20′9.45″N 75°54′41.03″W

- Interactive map of Bonnie Castle Recreation Center
- Location: Alexandria Bay, New York
- Capacity: 3,500 (Ice Hockey)
- Surface: Ice

Tenant
- Thousand Islands Privateers (FHL) (2010–2012)

Bonnie Castle Recreation Center is an ice rink facility in Alexandria Bay, New York. It features an NHL sized sheet of ice for hockey, figure skating, and open skating. It is just three miles from Bonnie Castle Year Round Resort.

The ice arena was the home of a professional hockey team, the Thousand Islands Privateers of the Federal Hockey League, from 2010 until 2012, when they moved their home games to nearby Watertown. Currently the arena plays host to local high school hockey teams and recreational teams. Current seating capacity for spectators is 3,500.

The center closed after the departure of the Thousand Islands Privateers in 2012. In August 2019, the town board approved $5.5 million in bonds for the purchase and rehabilitation of the center and on November 5, 2019, the voters approved the bond measure. Engineers were hired to commence the project in February 2022, initially to repair the roof; the venue will remain an ice arena after renovations.
