= Bates Battaglia =

American ice hockey player (born 1975)

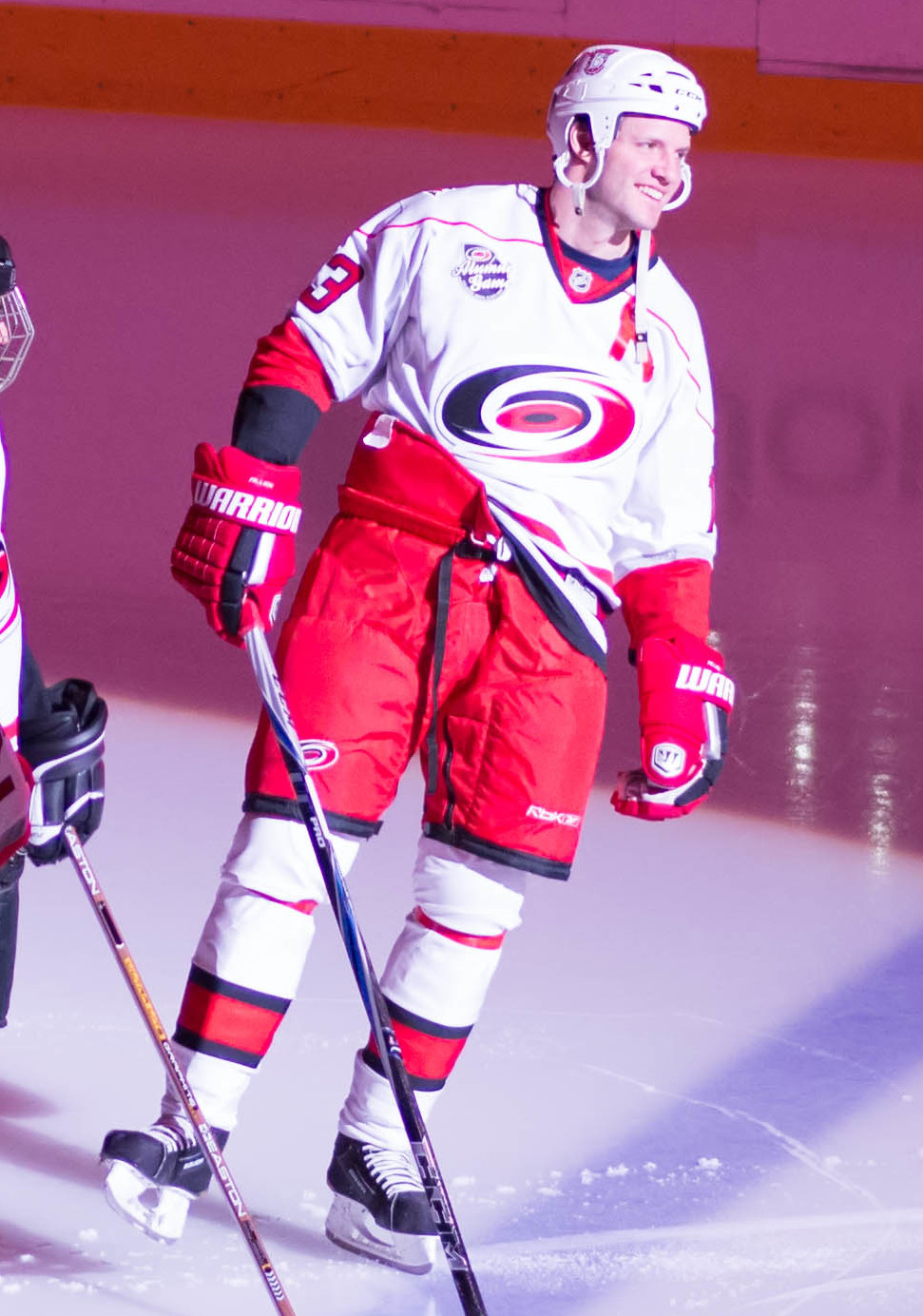
- Battaglia with the Carolina Hurricanes in 2013 in an annual alumni game
- Born: December 13, 1975 (age 50) Chicago, Illinois, U.S.
- Height: 6 ft 2 in (188 cm)
- Weight: 205 lb (93 kg; 14 st 9 lb)
- Position: Left wing
- Shot: Left
- Played for: Carolina Hurricanes; Colorado Avalanche; Washington Capitals; Toronto Maple Leafs; Jokerit
- National team: United States
- NHL draft: 132nd overall, 1994; Mighty Ducks of Anaheim
- Playing career: 1997–2012

Jonathan "Bates" Battaglia (born December 13, 1975) is an American former professional ice hockey left winger who played in the National Hockey League (NHL) with the Carolina Hurricanes, Colorado Avalanche, Washington Capitals and the Toronto Maple Leafs from 1997 to 2008. He finished his professional career in 2012 with Karlskrona HK of the Swedish HockeyAllsvenskan.

== Playing career ==
Battaglia was drafted by the Mighty Ducks of Anaheim in the sixth round, 132nd overall, of the 1994 NHL entry draft. Growing up, Bates played hockey in Park Ridge, Illinois, under coach Tom Godwin. He played on the three-time NCAA National Championship-winning Lake Superior State University Lakers ice hockey team from 1994 to 1997.

On March 18, 1997, Battaglia was traded by the Mighty Ducks to the Hartford Whalers for Mark Janssens. He made his professional debut in the 1997–98 season with the Beast of New Haven of the American Hockey League (AHL) before making his NHL debut with the Carolina Hurricanes in their inaugural season in Raleigh, having relocated from Hartford, Connecticut. Battaglia established himself as an NHL regular with the Hurricanes, enjoying his most successful period as a third of the "BBC line" (consisting of Rod Brind'Amour, Battaglia and Erik Cole) during their run to the 2002 Stanley Cup Finals.

On March 11, 2003, Battaglia was traded to the Colorado Avalanche in exchange for Radim Vrbata. His tenure with Colorado was short, as he was traded at the start of the 2003–04 season (along with Jonas Johansson) to the Washington Capitals in exchange for Steve Konowalchuk.

During the 2004–05 NHL lockout, on February 21, 2005, Battaglia joined his younger brother Anthony on the Mississippi Sea Wolves of the ECHL for the 2004–05 season.

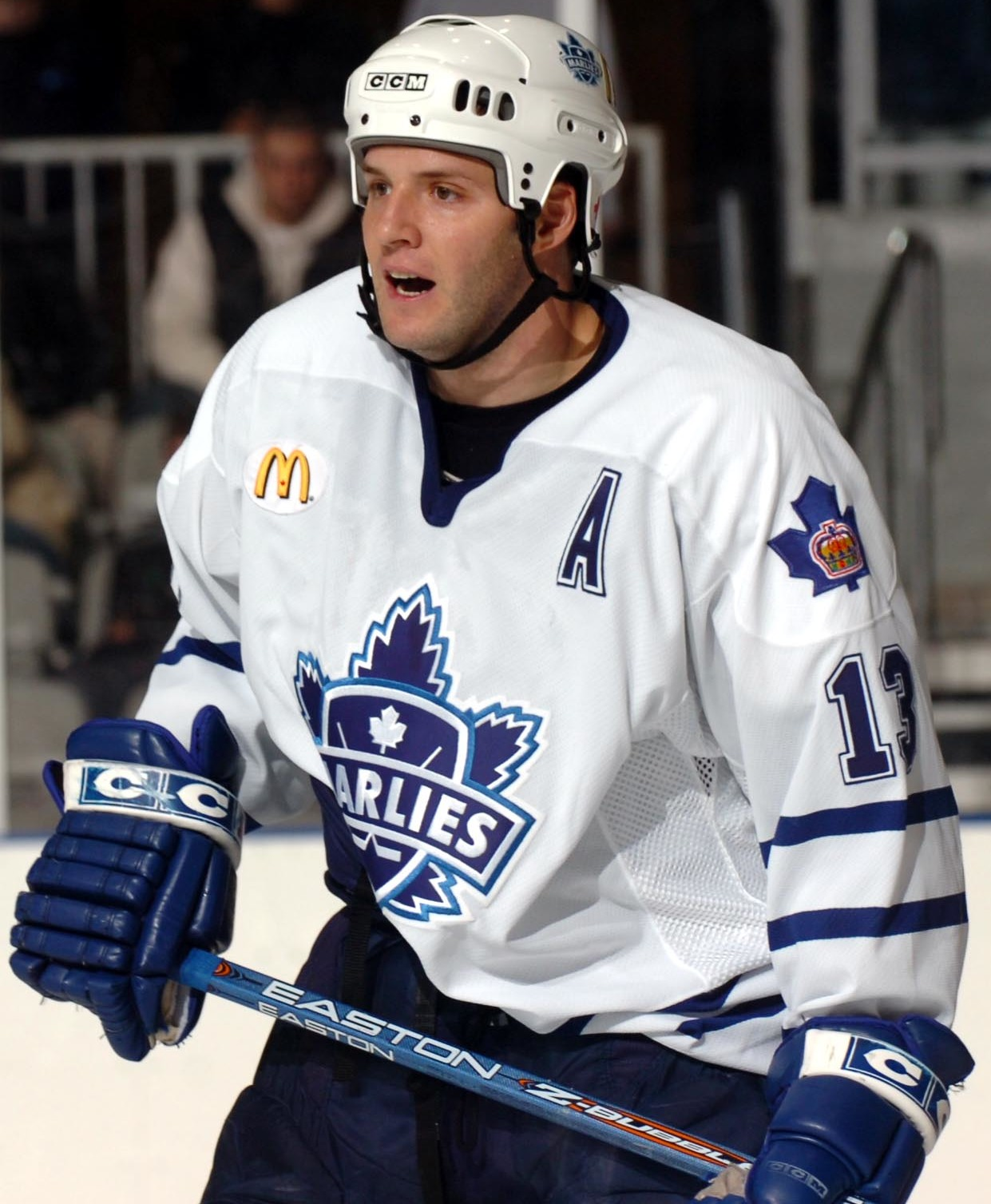
Battaglia with the Toronto Marlies in 2005

On October 2, 2005, Battaglia was signed by the AHL's Toronto Marlies to a one-year contract. For the following season, on July 2, 2006, he signed as a free agent with the Marlies' NHL parent club, the Toronto Maple Leafs, to a one-year contract. On July 2, 2007, he re-signed as a free agent with the Maple Leafs to a two-year contract. On December 13, 2007, he was assigned to the Marlies on a conditioning stint, but was left in the minors for the duration of the season. He was again assigned to the Marlies at the start of the 2008–09 season and scored a respectable 51 points in 59 games for the Marlies.

A free agent in the 2009–10 season, on November 11, 2009, Battaglia signed with the AHL's Syracuse Crunch. After 29 games with the Crunch, he left the club after signing a contract for the rest of the season with Finnish team Jokerit of the SM-liiga as an injury replacement on January 28, 2010.

On December 8, 2010, Battaglia signed a 25-game professional try-out contract with the AHL's Rochester Americans. After contributing only 3 points in 20 games with the Americans, he was released and signed with Lausitzer Füchse of the German 2nd Bundesliga. Battaglia's brief stay with Füchse was limited to two games due to injury, and on March 16, 2011, he returned to North America and signed to again join his brother Anthony, this time with the Tulsa Oilers of the Central Hockey League.

In November 2011, Battaglia signed with Karlskrona HK of the Swedish Division 1. In the 2011–12 season, Battaglia scored 23 points in 25 games to help Karlskrona gain promotion to the HockeyAllsvenskan. Battaglia finished third among import players in league scoring behind Andrew Fournier and Bill Keenan.

== Personal life ==
Battaglia is the grandson of former Chicago Outfit mobster Sam Battaglia, although this family connection has been downplayed by Battaglia in interviews. Bates and his brother Anthony competed in twenty-second season of The Amazing Race and won the season.

== Career statistics ==
=== Regular season and playoffs ===
			Regular season					Playoffs
Season	Team	League	GP	G	A	Pts	PIM	GP	G	A	Pts	PIM
1992–93	Team Illinois AAA	MWEHL	60	42	42	84	68	—	—	—	—	—
1993–94	Caledon Canadians	MetJHL	44	15	33	48	104	—	—	—	—	—
1994–95	Lake Superior State University	CCHA	38	6	15	21	32	—	—	—	—	—
1995–96	Lake Superior State University	CCHA	40	13	22	35	48	—	—	—	—	—
1996–97	Lake Superior State University	CCHA	38	12	27	39	80	—	—	—	—	—
1997–98	Carolina Hurricanes	NHL	33	2	4	6	10	—	—	—	—	—
1997–98	Beast of New Haven	AHL	48	15	21	36	48	1	0	0	0	0
1998–99	Carolina Hurricanes	NHL	60	7	11	18	22	6	0	3	3	8
1999–00	Carolina Hurricanes	NHL	77	16	18	34	39	—	—	—	—	—
2000–01	Carolina Hurricanes	NHL	80	12	15	27	76	6	0	2	2	2
2001–02	Carolina Hurricanes	NHL	82	21	25	46	44	23	5	9	14	14
2002–03	Carolina Hurricanes	NHL	70	5	14	19	90	—	—	—	—	—
2002–03	Colorado Avalanche	NHL	13	1	5	6	10	7	0	2	2	4
2003–04	Colorado Avalanche	NHL	4	0	1	1	4	—	—	—	—	—
2003–04	Washington Capitals	NHL	66	4	6	10	38	—	—	—	—	—
2004–05	Mississippi Sea Wolves	ECHL	25	6	11	17	24	4	0	0	0	10
2005–06	Toronto Marlies	AHL	79	20	47	67	86	5	1	1	2	6
2006–07	Toronto Maple Leafs	NHL	82	12	19	31	45	—	—	—	—	—
2007–08	Toronto Maple Leafs	NHL	13	0	0	0	7	—	—	—	—	—
2007–08	Toronto Marlies	AHL	56	12	14	26	42	19	6	2	8	28
2008–09	Toronto Marlies	AHL	59	17	34	51	55	6	2	3	5	4
2009–10	Syracuse Crunch	AHL	29	6	16	22	15	—	—	—	—	—
2009–10	Jokerit	SM-l	17	1	0	1	12	2	1	0	1	0
2010–11	Rochester Americans	AHL	20	1	2	3	12	—	—	—	—	—
2010–11	Lausitzer Füchse	GER-2	2	1	1	2	2	—	—	—	—	—
2010–11	Tulsa Oilers	CHL	6	1	3	4	4	10	5	2	7	4
2011–12	Karlskrona HK	SWE-3	25	10	13	23	20	10	2	4	6	4
NHL totals			580	80	118	198	385	42	5	16	21	28

=== International ===
Medal record

Representing United States

Ice hockey

World Championships
Bronze medal – third place	2004 Prague	

Year	Team	Event	GP	G	A	Pts	PIM
1995	United States	WJC	7	3	2	5	2
1998	United States	WC	6	1	1	2	6
2004	United States	WC	9	2	2	4	14
Junior totals			7	3	2	5	2
Senior totals			15	3	3	6	20

== Awards and honors ==
Award	Year
College
CCHA All-Tournament Team	1995

Awards and achievements
Preceded by Wayne Strachan	CCHA Best Defensive Forward; 1995-96	Succeeded by John Madden
Awards and achievements
Preceded by Josh Kilmer-Purcell and Brent Ridge	The Amazing Race (American TV series); Winners of The Amazing Race 22 with Anthony Battaglia	Succeeded by Jason Case and Amy Diaz
