= 2013–14 FHL season =

The 2013–14 Federal Hockey League season was the fourth season of the Federal Hockey League.

== Regular season ==
Team	GP	W	OTW	OTL	L	PTS	GF	GA
Danbury Whalers	56	35	2	8	11	117	241	160
Dayton Demonz	57	33	7	3	14	116	278	181
Watertown Privateers	56	15	5	4	32	59	195	254
Danville Dashers	57	10	6	5	36	47	181	300

Advanced to playoffs

== Playoffs ==
Semifinal			Final
			1	Danbury	2
			2	Dayton	3
2	Dayton	2	2	Dayton	3
3	Watertown	1
