= 2012–13 FHL season =

The 2012–13 Federal Hockey League season was the third season of the Federal Hockey League.

== Regular season ==
	GP	W	L	OTW	OTL	SOL	GF	GA	Pts
Dayton Demonz	51	36	6	6	2	1	320	183	123
Danbury Whalers	51	24	17	4	3	3	218	188	86
Thousand Islands Privateers	53	18	26	5	2	2	188	213	68
Williamsport Outlaws	41	19	16	3	3	0	191	167	66
Danville Dashers	54	18	28	3	3	2	220	268	65
Cape Cod Bluefins	17	3	12	1	1	0	55	92	12
New York Bluefins	13	1	12	0	0	0	36	101	3
Pennsylvania Blues	4	1	3	0	0	0	12	28	3

† Advanced to playoffs

== Playoffs ==
Semifinals
1	Dayton Demonz	3
4	Danville Dashers	0
2	Danbury Whalers	3
3	Thousand Islands Privateers	0

Final
1	Dayton Demonz	0
2	Danbury Whalers	3
