= Bowman Field =

Baseball park in Williamsport, Pennsylvania, US

Historic Bowman Field
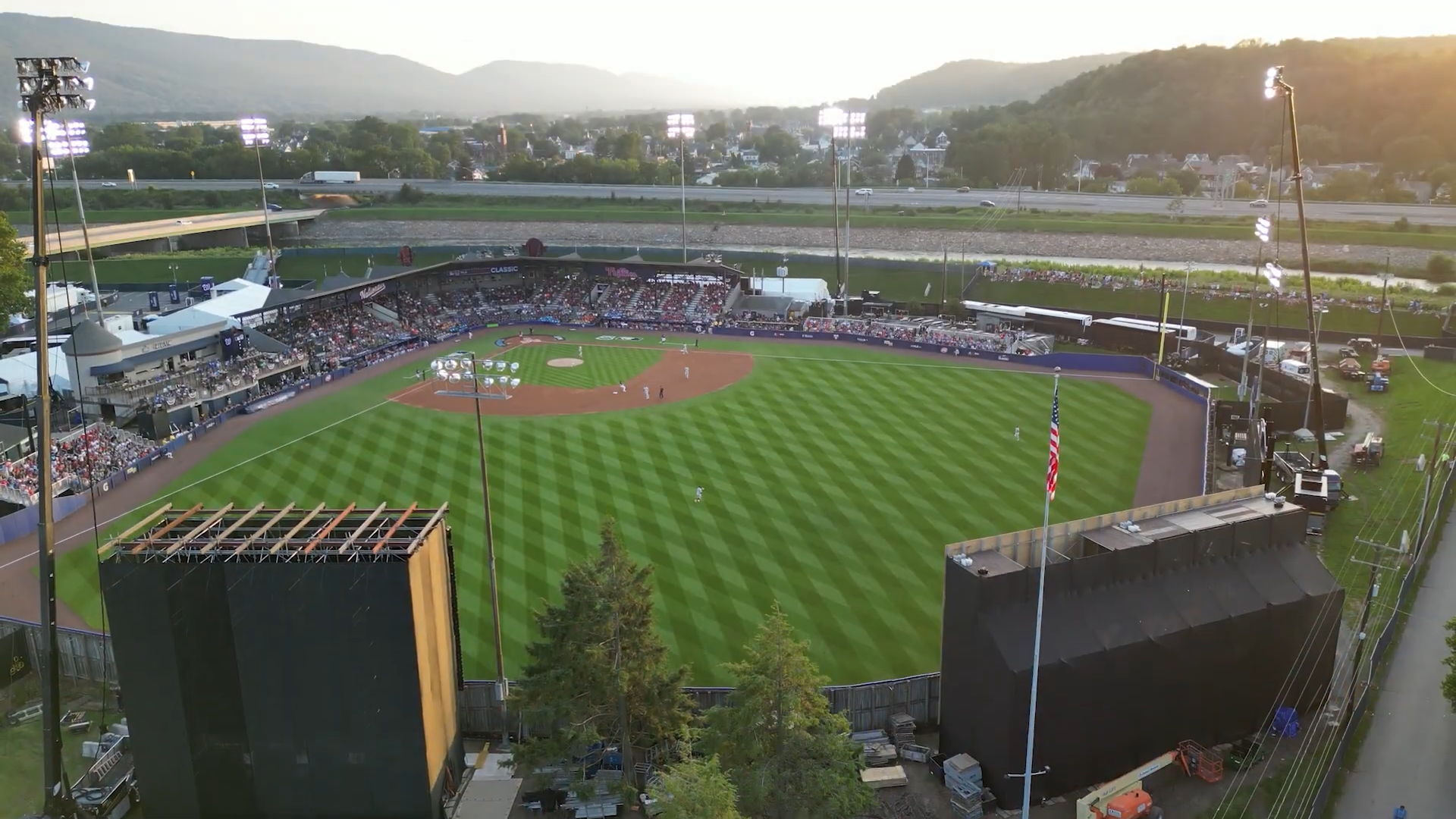
- Bowman Field during the 2023 MLB Little League Classic
- Interactive map of Historic Bowman Field
- Former names: Memorial Field (1926–1929); Bowman Field (1929–2000)
- Location: Williamsport, Pennsylvania 17701
- Coordinates: 41.242347°N 77.047067°W
- Owner: City of Williamsport
- Operator: Williamsport Crosscutters
- Capacity: 2,366
- Surface: Grass
- Field size: Left Field: 323 ft (98 m); Center Field: 411 ft (125 m); Right Field: 331 ft (101 m)

Construction
- Groundbreaking: October 1925
- Opened: April 22, 1926; 100 years ago
- Cost: US$75,000 ($1,091,000 in 2025)
- General contractor: James V. Bennett/Drennen Bros./J. C. Dressler

Tenants
- Williamsport Crosscutters (NYPL/MLBDL) 1999–present MLB Little League Classic (MLB) 2017–present Williamsport Outlaws (FHL) 2012; Williamsport Cubs (NYPL) 1994–1998; Williamsport Bills (EL) 1987–1991; Williamsport Tomahawks (EL) 1976; Williamsport Red Sox (NYPL) 1971–1972; Williamsport Astros (NYPL) 1968–1970; Williamsport Mets (EL) 1964–1967; Williamsport Grays (EL) 1954–1956, 1958–1962; Williamsport A's (EL) 1953; Williamsport Tigers (EL) 1951–1952; Williamsport Grays (EL) 1950; Williamsport Tigers (EL) 1947–1949; Williamsport Grays (EL) 1938–1946; Williamsport Grays (NYPL I) 1926–1937

Pennsylvania Historical Marker
- Official name: Bowman Field
- Designated: July 29, 2000

Historic Bowman Field is a minor league baseball stadium in Williamsport, Pennsylvania, in the United States. It is home to the Williamsport Crosscutters, a collegiate summer baseball team of the MLB Draft League. The official seating capacity is 2,366. Opened in 1926, Bowman Field is the second-oldest ballpark in minor league baseball. Bowman Field is also the home field for the Wildcats of the Pennsylvania College of Technology for more than a decade. A new field project for the Penn College Wildcats was planned to be completed by 2022, but has since been delayed.

Named for local businessman J. Walton Bowman in 1929, Bowman Field had the official designation "Historic" added in 2000.

Since 2017, Bowman Field has been used for a regular-season Major League Baseball (MLB) game, the MLB Little League Classic, held each August while the Little League World Series is underway in nearby South Williamsport.

In 2012, Airmen Pond, an outdoor ice hockey rink, was built at Bowman Field. It served as home ice for the Williamsport Outlaws of the Federal Hockey League until the team folded in January 2013.

== History ==
=== Ballparks in Williamsport before Bowman Field ===
Williamsport has hosted minor league baseball since the late 19th century. The various teams played at differing sites in Williamsport. The earliest ballfield was near the West Branch Susquehanna River. It has long since been replaced by a levee and U.S. Route 220, U.S. Route 15 and Interstate 180. A second and more permanent facility was built in the Vallamont neighborhood. Cochran Elementary School sits on the former site of the ballpark. The Williamsport Bills and later Williamsport Grays played the seasons at Williamsport High School's athletic field on West 3rd Street. It too is long since gone; this property is currently home of the Pennsylvania College of Technology.

=== Construction and opening ===
Bowman Field was completed in 1926 to host the city's entry as an original franchise in the New York–Pennsylvania League called the Williamsport Grays. The Grays were a charter member of the New York–Pennsylvania league which was established in 1923. Two of the most important boosters and financial backers of the team were J. Walton Bowman for whom the stadium was named and Thomas Gray, the Lycoming County sheriff, for whom the Grays were named.

The Grays had previously been playing their home games on the athletic field of Williamsport High School. This facility proved to be much too small. A larger and more permanent stadium was needed. A group of civic leaders and baseball boosters lead the drive to construct a new stadium for the Grays on the western side of Williamsport on the banks of Lycoming Creek. An agreement between the Grays and the city was reached in July, 1925 to build what was then known as Memorial Field, which was named for the municipal park in which it is located. J. Walton Bowman headed an 11-member holding company that financed and managed the construction of the ballpark at a cost of $75,000 (equivalent to $1,091,000 in 2025). Ground was broken in the fall of 1925 and the stadium opened in time for the beginning of the 1926 New York–Pennsylvania League season.

The original dimensions of Bowman Field were quite large compared to the dimensions of modern baseball fields. Bowman Field measured 367 feet (112 m) to the right field foul pole, 450 feet (137 m) to dead center field and 400 feet (122 m) to the left field foul pole. Another unusual feature of the stadium was a terrace that was located on left field near the fence.

The first game to be played at Bowman Field took place on April 22, 1926, when the Grays hosted the team of nearby Bucknell University in an exhibition. The first professional opponent to appear at Bowman Field was the Harrisburg Colored Giants. The Grays lost two games to the Giants on April 27 and 29. The first New York–Pennsylvania League game took place on May 4. The Grays beat the Shamokin Indians 5-1.

=== Eastern League ===
The Eastern League was at Bowman off and on for nearly 70 years. The Williamsport Grays started play in 1926 in Bowman Field. The final Eastern League team to call the park home was the 1991 Williamsport Bills. That team moved to Binghamton, New York, the next season and became the Binghamton Mets.

The Grays began playing in the forerunner of the Eastern League, the old New York–Pennsylvania League in 1923. The Class B league was made entirely of teams from New York and Pennsylvania. It kept this name until 1938 when the Scranton Miners move to Hartford, Connecticut. Williamsport was a member of the league for 46 years between 1923 and 1991. The teams were known as the Grays, Tigers, A's, Mets, Tomahawks and Bills. Williamsport had affiliations with the Philadelphia A's for three periods, Pittsburgh Pirates, Detroit Tigers, Washington Senators, Philadelphia Phillies, New York Mets, Cleveland Indians for two separate periods, and Seattle Mariners.

The Phillies played a mid season exhibition game at Bowman Field on July 31, 1962, when the team lost to the Williamsport Grays, the Phillies' Eastern League affiliate.

==== The potato incident ====
Dave Bresnahan, a distant relative of Hall of Famer Roger Bresnahan, was catching for the 1987 Williamsport Bills, who were in seventh place in an eight-team league, playing the last-place Reading Phillies in late-August game. With a runner on third base, Bresnahan switched catcher's mitts and put on a glove in which he had concealed a shaved-down potato. When the pitch came in, Bresnahan fired the white potato down the third-base line, enticing the runner to sprint home. Bresnahan then tagged the runner with the baseball, prompting the umpire to award the runner home plate for Bresnahan's deception, even though he clearly had been tagged out with the ball.

Bresnahan was released by the team the day after the incident. However, the citizens of Williamsport applauded Bresnahan for his ingenuity, eventually prompting the club to retire his number 59. At the retirement ceremony in 1998, Bresnahan was quoted as saying, "Lou Gehrig had to play in 2,130 consecutive games and hit .340 for his number to be retired, and all I had to do was bat .140 and throw a potato."

=== New York–Penn League ===
For the 1994 season, baseball returned to Bowman with the New York–Penn League's Williamsport Cubs. The club became the Crosscutters, a Pittsburgh Pirates farm team, in 1999. Significant stadium upgrades took place prior to the 2002 season. The club became a farm team of the Philadelphia Phillies in 2006. In conjunction with Major League Baseball's reorganization of the minors after the 2020 season, Williamsport left the New York–Penn League and became a collegiate summer baseball team of the newly created MLB Draft League, which is a showcase for draft-eligible players.

=== Ice hockey–Federal Hockey League ===
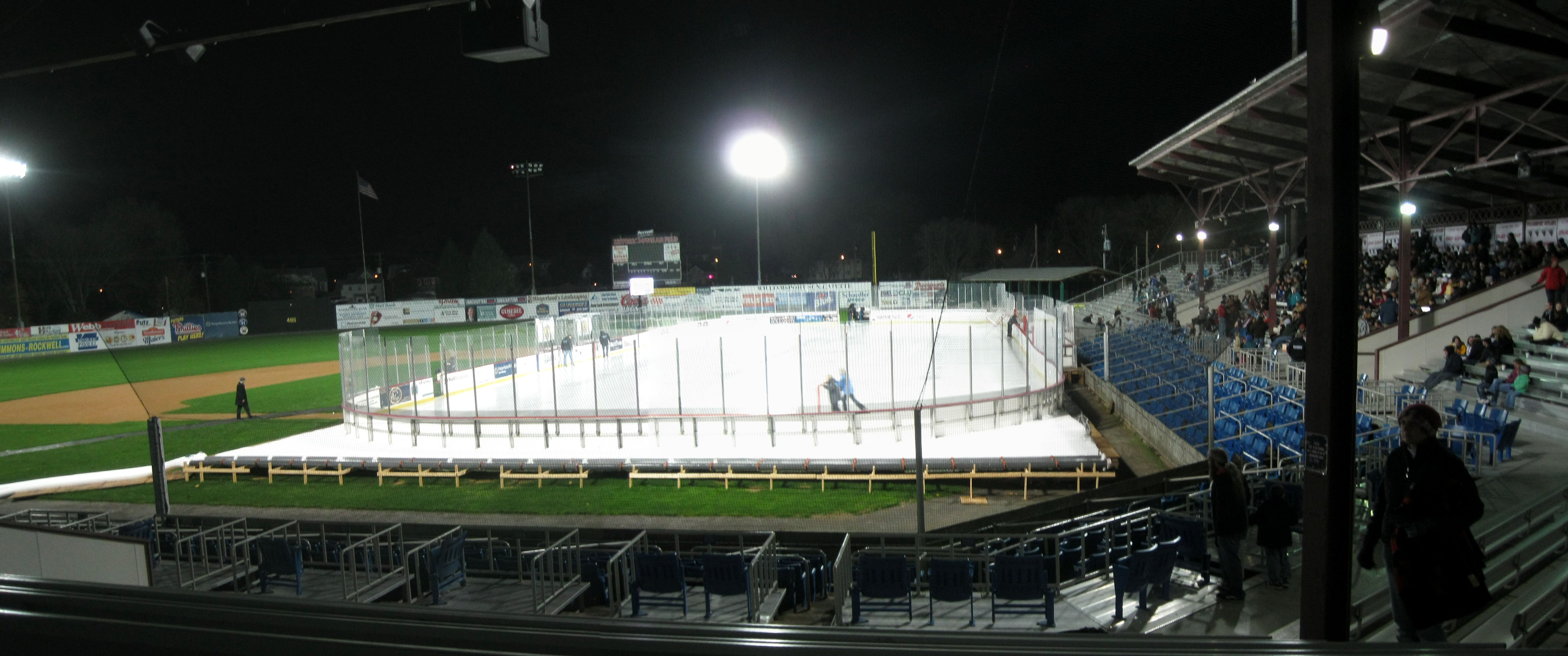
Airmen Pond ice hockey rink at Bowman Field in 2012

On July 24, 2012, Williamsport mayor Gabriel J. Campana announced that the Williamsport Outlaws of the Federal Hockey League (FHL) would play their 2012–2013 season at an outdoor ice rink built at Bowman Field. The Outlaws were the FHL champions their previous (and first) season, which they played in Wayne, New Jersey, as the "New Jersey Outlaws". On August 1 the Crosscutters and Outlaws agreed to terms regarding restoration of the baseball diamond after the removal of the ice rink at the end of the hockey season, though beer sales at Outlaws games were still an issue (as the Crosscutters hold the liquor license for the stadium). Construction of the ice rink, named Airmen Pond after a local sponsor, began in early October. The rink was also open for public skating and use by local amateur teams.

The 80-by-200-foot (24 by 61 m) ice rink officially opened on October 18, and the first home game of the Outlaws' 60-game season on October 24 drew over 3,000 fans, an FHL record. The Dayton Demonz beat the Outlaws 5–2; temperatures were over 65 °F (18 °C) for much of the game. Williamsport Ice Arena, a local non-profit group headed by FHL commissioner Don Kirnan, operated the ice rink and rented it to the Outlaws and other users. In November 2012, the non-profit filed an injunction seeking to prevent the rink's builder, Rink Specialists of Naples, Maine, from repossessing it for late payments; both sides alleged breach of contract. The FHL All Star Game was scheduled to be played at Bowman Field on January 2, 2013.

=== Renovation project ===
On May 26, 2016, Mayor Gabriel Campana, Peter B. Freund, Crosscutters principal owner, Crosscutters staff, and other stakeholders broke ground for a first base deck where fans can interact while enjoying food and refreshments. This deck is part of a $3 million project to upgrade one of the oldest baseball parks in the country. The newly announced renovations are being made possible by a $1.25 million RACP Grant by the state. As of 2017, the renovation decreased the capacity to 2,366.

=== MLB Little League Classic ===
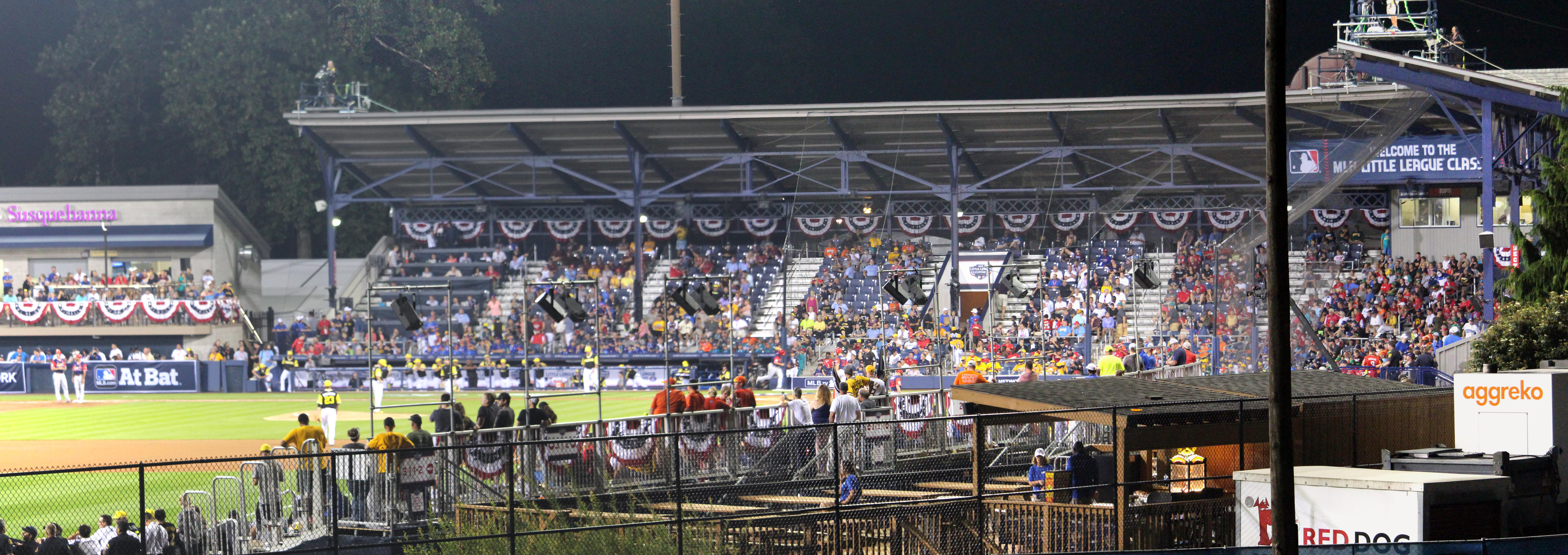
Bowman Field during the inaugural MLB Little League Classic in 2017

On March 9, 2017, Major League Baseball announced that the first MLB Little League Classic would take place on August 20 of that year, during the Little League World Series. In a statement, Commissioner of Baseball Rob Manfred said that the league's "greatest responsibility is to ensure that today's youth become active participants in our game as players and fans." The St. Louis Cardinals and the Pittsburgh Pirates were selected to play in that game. Tickets to the game were reserved for those involved in the Little League World Series, as well as a limited number of residents of Lycoming County on a lottery basis. The game was televised by ESPN as its weekly Sunday Night Baseball game. Two members of the Cardinals had played in Williamsport during past Little League World Series; outfielder Randal Grichuk for the Lamar Little League team in 2003 and 2004, and pitcher Lance Lynn for the Brownsburg Little League team in 1999. Over the last few weeks before the game, the field was renovated to conform to MLB's standards. The outfield dimensions were changed to 331 feet (101 m) to right field, 411 feet (125 m) to center field, and 323 feet (98 m) to left field; prior to this the dimensions measured 351–408–341 feet (107–124–104 m) from right to left.

=== Names ===
The stadium was known as Memorial Field from 1926 until 1929. It was renamed Bowman Field on June 26, 1929, to honor J. Walton Bowman, the president of the Grays at the time. Bowman had a large role in the effort to fund and construct the stadium. He was also honored by the players of the team with a Swiss watch, and his granddaughter was given the honor of hoisting a pennant in center field bearing the name "Bowman Field". In 2000, the name was changed to Historic Bowman Field.

In 2014, Susquehanna Bank entered into a naming rights agreement with the city, which then added the bank's name to the stadium's name. In 2016, that sponsor was purchased by a larger bank, BB&T, and the stadium updated its name accordingly. When that deal expired in 2020, the city looked for a new sponsor, but there was only one offer, from Muncy Bank and Trust. The six-year contract paid the city nothing for the first year and $32,500 annually for the next five years. Muncy Bank and Trust merged with another bank in 2023 to form Journey Bank, and the name of the sponsor for Bowman Field changed again to reflect that.

== Championship teams ==
Bowman Field has been the home to four championship teams and one co-champion.

- 1934 Grays, New York–Pennsylvania
- 1960 Grays, Eastern co-champions
- 2001 Crosscutters, New York–Penn co-champions
- 2003 Crosscutters, New York–Penn
- 2024 Crosscutters, MLB Draft League
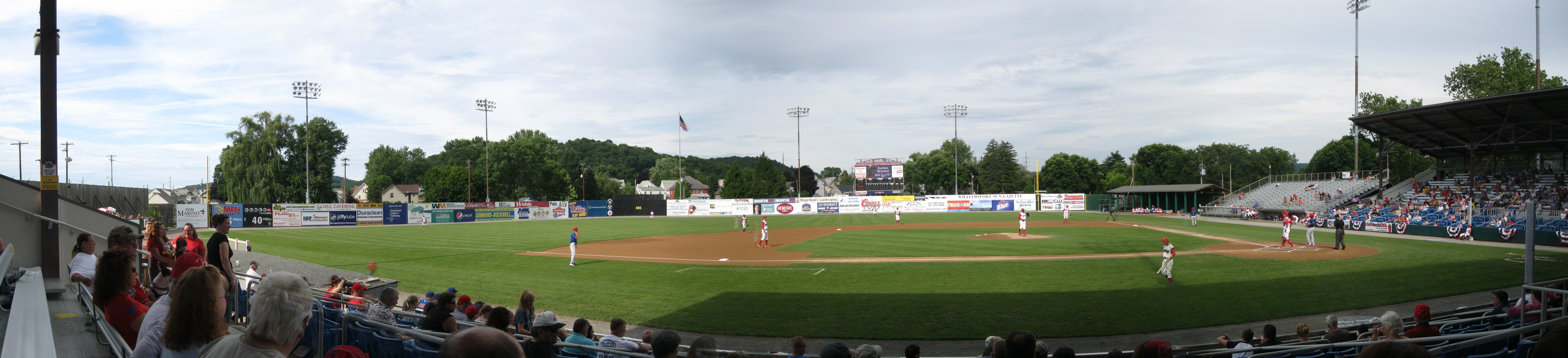
Panoramic view of Bowman Field from the third base side—the Crosscutters (in white and red uniforms) are playing the Auburn Doubledays in a June 2012 game
