= Danville Dashers (FPHL) =

Dashers Hockey
- City: Danville, Illinois
- League: Federal Prospects Hockey League
- Founded: 2011
- Folded: 2025
- Home arena: David S. Palmer Arena
- Colors: Black, orange, white
- Owner(s): Barry Soskin
- Head coach: Paul MacLean

Franchise history
- 2011–2021: Danville Dashers

Championships
- Regular season titles: 1 (2016–17)
- Playoff championships: 1 (2017)

The Danville Dashers were a hockey team from Danville, Illinois, in the Federal Prospects Hockey League. The team is now known as Dashers Hockey during their second incarnation from 2024. The Dashers were named in honor of the original Danville Dashers. From 2011 to 2020, the team played their home games at David S. Palmer Arena, which was also home to the original Dashers that played in the Continental Hockey League from 1981 to 1986, but were voted out of the arena in 2021. On February 28, 2024, it was announced that the David S. Palmer Arena board had accepted the lease from Barry Soskin and Diane Short to bring the Danville Dashers back for the 2024–25 season. The team and arena parted ways at the end of the 2024–25 season.

== History ==
The new Dashers were announced as a Federal Hockey League (FHL) expansion team in June 2011 to begin play in the 2011–12 season. The team was owned by Barry Soskin, who also had owned several junior and professional teams in the region, and was led by head coach and general manager Scott Beneke. On April 10, 2012, the Dashers announced an affiliation agreement with the Central Hockey League's Bloomington Blaze.

On December 20, 2013, it was announced that the Dashers would play the Watertown Privateers in a neutral site game in Connellsville, Pennsylvania, on March 22, 2014. The goal of the game was to test local interest in hockey with the idea of an expansion team being awarded to Connellsville if successful. The next season, the league awarded an expansion team in nearby Belle Vernon, but it was quickly folded.

After three seasons as head coach and winning the league championship, Steve Harrison left the Dashers to become head coach of the Dallas Blackhawks of the North American Prospects Hockey League, a U18 youth league. Former captain Brent Clarke was hired to replace Harrison for the 2017–18 season. Clarke had previously won coach of the year while with the Watertown Wolves when they won the FHL championship. Clarke left after one season to be closer to his family and took the head coaching job with the 2018 expansion team, the Elmira Enforcers. Clarke was replaced by Paul MacLean, a coach that had most recently been in the Greater Ontario Junior Hockey League. MacLean was fired on December 19, 2018, after a 9–8 start. After a month with Dustin Henning acting as player-coach, the Dashers hired former CHL Indianapolis Ice head coach Rod Davidson on January 22, 2019, who stayed until the end of the season. The Dashers then hired another former Dashers' player Ray Tremblay as the head coach for the 2019–20 season.

In 2018, the FHL began calling itself the Federal Prospects Hockey League (FPHL) and fully rebranded before the 2019–20 season. The FPHL was then among the many leagues that had to prematurely end their seasons in 2020 due to the COVID-19 pandemic. During the shutdown, the Palmer Arena's operators looked to terminate the Dashers' contract with the venue, but the arena's board upheld the contract in the Dashers' favor. Subsequently, the Dashers were one of several FPHL teams that did not immediately return to play in the delayed 2020–21 season when it commenced in February 2021. On March 9, 2021, the arena again held a meeting to determine whether to keep the Dashers as a tenant or give a contract to a new team, ultimately deciding to go forward with a new team called the Vermilion County Bobcats in the Southern Professional Hockey League. The Dashers' management stated they might pursue relocation or other forms of keeping the team active, but the Dashers will not be returning to Palmer Arena.

On November 21, 2023, the David S. Palmer Arena board agreed to work with Barry Soskin on returning the Dashers to Danville for the 2024–2025 professional hockey season with a conference call scheduled to work out the terms of a lease on November 27. Diane Short was once again named the team's GM. On February 28, 2024, it was announced that the David S. Palmer Arena board had accepted the lease from Barry Soskin and Diane Short to bring the Danville Dashers back for the 2024–25 season. On May 30, 2024, it was made official, that the Dashers were back for the 2024–25 season. AJ Tesoriero will be the team's head coach and the team will be known as Dashers Hockey. In January 2025, ahead of a future expansion of the FPHL into Topeka, Kansas, the Dashers played two neutral site games against the Baton Rouge Zydeco and Port Huron Prowlers while branded as the "Topeka Scarecrows", in honor of the former CHL team of the same name.

The Dashers set a North American Pro Hockey record 43 losses in a row from October 26, 2024 to March 20, 2025 when they beat the HC Venom 7-3. They would win one more game to finish their only season in Dashers 2.0 history 3-49-3-1. The team and arena parted ways at the end of the season.

== Season-by-season record ==
Danville Dashers (2011-2020)
Season	GP	W	L	OTL	Pts (Note: 3 points for a Win, 2 points for an Overtime Win, and 1 point for an Overtime Loss)	GF	GA	PIM	Finish	Playoffs
2011–12	43	6	34	3	20	152	238	977	7th of 8, FHL	Did not qualify
2012–13	54	21	28	5	65	220	268	1120	5th of 6, FHL	Lost Semifinals, 0–2 vs. Dayton Demonz
2013–14	57	16	36	5	47	181	300	1351	4th of 4, FHL	Did not qualify
2014–15	56	31	20	5	92	238	193	959	3rd of 6, FHL	Lost Finals, 2–3 vs. Watertown Wolves
2015–16	56	33	16	7	103	225	185	816	3rd of 6, FHL	Lost Semifinals, 1–2 vs. Port Huron Prowlers
2016–17	56	40	9	4	129	229	121	597	1st of 7, FHL	Won Finals, 3–2 vs. Berlin River Drivers
2017–18	56	22	29	5	68	182	193	863	5th of 7, FHL	Lost Semifinals, 0–2 vs. Port Huron Prowlers
2018–19	59	19	36	4	58	197	263	1241	6th of 6, FHL	Did not qualify
2019–20	47	26	18	3	79	174	150	806	3rd of 5, Western	Season cancelled (Note: League cancelled season due to the COVID-19 pandemic.)
