= Rome Frenzy =

- City: Rome, New York
- League: Federal Hockey League
- Founded: 2010
- Home arena: John F. Kennedy Civic Arena
- Colors: Black, ice blue, white
- Owner: Brian J. Hall
- Media: Rome Sentinel

Franchise history
- 2010–2011: Rome Frenzy

Championships
- Regular season titles: 0

The Rome Frenzy were a minor professional hockey team in the Federal Hockey League based in Rome, New York. It was one of 6 teams in the FHL's inaugural 2010–11 season, with home games played at the John F. Kennedy Civic Arena.

== History ==
After witnessing an average of only 215 fans in 21 home games, the Frenzy suspended operations in early February 2011, three weeks before the season was scheduled to end after being eliminated from the playoff picture. The team was expected to continue operations in the 2011–12 season in a new location, however, the team did not return.

== References and external links ==
- Rome Frenzy official website
- Federal Hockey League
