= Danbury Titans =

- City: Danbury, Connecticut
- League: Federal Hockey League
- Founded: 2015
- Folded: 2017
- Home arena: Danbury Ice Arena
- Colors: Blue and green
- Owners: Bruce Bennett, Ed Crowe
- Head coach: David Lun
- Website: Official website

Franchise history
- 2015–2017: Danbury Titans

Championships
- Regular season titles: 1 (2015–16)

The Danbury Titans were a professional ice hockey team based in Danbury, Connecticut. Replacing the Danbury Whalers, the team was founded as an expansion team in the Federal Hockey League. They played their home games at the Danbury Ice Arena.

== History ==
On April 3, 2015, the Danbury Ice Arena announced that it did not want to renew its contract with the Federal Hockey League's Danbury Whalers and gave them a notice to evict by April 17, leaving the team homeless. Prior to their eviction, the Whalers led the FHL home attendance for the league's first five seasons. On June 3, 2015, due to the eviction of the Danbury Whalers, the FHL announced a new team based in nearby Brewster, New York, to be called the Stateline Whalers, and would play at the Brewster Ice Arena under former Danbury Whalers CEO and managing partner, Herm Sorcher. The Danbury Whalers were then officially considered to be on hiatus for the season by the FHL, but gave up their naming and territorial rights to Brewster.

However, on June 27, 2015, it was reported that the FHL had approved of a new team in Danbury, Connecticut, to replace the departed Whalers. Local Danbury businessmen, Bruce Bennett and Edward Crowe were announced as the ownership group. Bennett would announce the new team as the Danbury Titans and had signed a six-year lease to play at the Danbury Ice Arena. Bennett and Crowe would also take over the Brewster franchise and rename it the Brewster Bulldogs and end any connections to the former Whalers franchise.

In the team's inaugural 2015–16 season, the Titans would finish first in the league after the regular season but would be swept in the league championships by the Port Huron Prowlers.

After two seasons, the Titans ceased operations.

== Season-by-season records ==
Season	GP	W	L	OTL	Pts (Note: 3 points for a Win, 2 points for an Overtime Win, and 1 point for an Overtime Loss)	Pct	GF	GA	PIM	Finish	Playoffs
2015–16	57	39	14	4	114	.667	295	198	1081	1st of 6, FHL	Lost FHL Championships, 0–3 vs. Port Huron Prowlers
2016–17	56	33	22	1	93	.554	206	182	816	3rd of 6, FHL	Lost Semifinals, 0–2 vs. Berlin River Drivers
