= Berkshire Battalion =

- City: North Adams, Massachusetts
- League: Federal Hockey League
- Founded: 2014
- Folded: 2015
- Home arena: Peter W. Foote Vietnam Veterans Memorial Skating Rink
- Colors: Federal blue, scarlet, white
- Owner: William Dadds
- Head coach: Vacant
- Media: The Berkshire Eagle
- Website: Berkshire Battalion website

Franchise history
- 2014–2015: Berkshire Battalion
- 2015–2016: Dayton Demolition

Championships
- Regular season titles: 0
- Playoff championships: 0

The Berkshire Battalion were a minor league professional ice hockey team in the Federal Hockey League that played during the 2014–15 season. Based in North Adams, Massachusetts, the Battalion played at the Peter W. Foote Vietnam Veterans Memorial Skating Rink.

Its leading scorer was Michael Dolman, with 28 goals and 52 assists for 80 points. Among its prominent players was Vlad Gavrik, who has played for the Ukraine men's national ice hockey team.

Dan Farrell was the Battalion's inaugural coach, but was fired mid-season after 19 games and replaced by general manager and player, Darin Lane, who had also been the rink's manager. Lane was named coach of the year along with the Watertown Wolves head coach, Brent Clarke. Lane was subsequently fired from the rink for embezzling $2,200, but stated his intention to remain as the team's coach and general manager. However, Lane resigned his position on June 18, 2015.

The team began the season owned by the league, but was later purchased by New Jersey businessman and father of one of the players, William Dadds.

On June 26, 2015, Dadds announced that he intended to relocate the team from North Adams before the 2015–16 season after lease negotiations for the ice rink fell through. The city administration asked the team to only play a maximum of three Friday night games next season and repay all current debts prior to any lease being signed by the city but Dadds decided that the demands were unreasonable. On July 15, he announced via his Facebook page that he was moving the team to Dayton, Ohio to replace the Dayton Demonz. This was confirmed the next day when the Port Huron Prowlers, an expansion team, announced that it had acquired the Demonz's protected players. The team lasted for a single season more as the Dayton Demolition, folding when the Hara Arena closed.

== Season-by-season record ==
Season	GP	W	L	OTL	Pts	GF	GA	Finish	Playoffs
2014–15	55	25	27	3	76	248	243	5th of 6 FHL	Did not qualify
