= Dayton Demonz =

- City: Dayton, Ohio
- League: Federal Hockey League
- Operated: 2012–2015
- Home arena: Hara Arena
- Colors: Black, red, white
- Owner: Barry Soskin
- Media: Dayton Daily News

Franchise history
- 2012: Dayton Devils
- 2012–2015: Dayton Demonz

Championships
- Division titles: 1 (2012–13)
- Playoff championships: 1 (2013–14)

The Dayton Demonz were a professional ice hockey team based in Dayton, Ohio, in the Federal Hockey League. After the Dayton Gems of the Central Hockey League ceased operations, the Demonz were created as an expansion team in the FHL. The team played their home games at the Hara Arena in nearby Trotwood. The team was originally known as the Dayton Devils before changing names prior to their inaugural season. The Demonz were an affiliate of the ECHL's Fort Wayne Komets.

== Inaugural season (2012–13) ==
The Demonz, in their first season of FHL play, won their first franchise regular season game, 5-2 over the Williamsport Outlaws, as well as their first ever home game at Hara Arena, a 4-2 defeat of the Danville Dashers. The Demonz would continue to dominate the other teams in the Federal Hockey League, having possession of first place the entire season and ending the regular season with a record of 36-6-3-6, for a points percentage of .804. This included only one regulation loss at Hara Arena the entire season. Other highlights of the season included a 12-game win streak from January 18 to February 10, and 11 straight home wins from October 27 through December 21. Dayton was second in the FHL in attendance, attracting an average of 1,146 fans per game, behind only the Danbury Whalers. The Demonz went on to sweep the Danville Dashers 3 games to none in the first round of the FHL playoffs, earning the FHL Western Division championship, and were eventually swept in three games by the Danbury Whalers in the Commissioners' Cup Finals.

== 2013–14 season ==
On December 18, 2013 it was announced that the Dayton Demonz would play against the Watertown Privateers in a neutral site game at the LJVM Coliseum Annex, located in Winston-Salem, North Carolina. The goal of the game is to test local fan interest so a team could be located in the market as early as the 2014–15 season. The Demonz defeated the Privateers 7 to 5 in front of a crowd of 2,440 people.

The Demonz battled the Danbury Whalers for first place for most of the season but finished second. The regular season record was 33-7-3-14 which was 33 wins in regulation, 7 wins in overtime, 3 losses in overtime, and 14 losses in regulation. Dayton finished the season second in attendance for back to back seasons attracting on average 850 people per game.

The Demonz defeated the Watertown Privateers in the opening round of the playoffs two games to one. They then advanced on to play the Danbury Whalers in the FHL playoffs finals. After being down two games, the Demonz battled back to win three straight games and capture the Commissioner's Cup.

== 2014–15 season ==
The Demonz qualified for the playoffs as the number two seed. The Danville Dashers defeated the Demonz in the first round, 2 games to 1. This marked the first time that the Demonz did not make it to the finals in their short history. The Demonz were second in league attendance for the third straight year drawing close to 1,200 fans per game. Despite the attendance, owner Barry Soskin decided he no longer wanted to be involved with the Demonz and Herm Sorcher was appointed as the Managing Partner for the Demonz by the league until a new owner could be found. With the Demonz lease on the arena up after the season, the league was able to agree to a new deal on June 4, 2015 but with no mention that the team to occupy the building would be the Demonz.

On July 16, 2015, the expansion team Port Huron Prowlers, owned by Barry Soskin, announced that it had acquired the Demonz protected players and that the Demonz would not operate in the 2015–16 season. Instead, the owner of the Berkshire Battalion, William Dadds, announced that he intended to relocate his team to play in Dayton and became the Dayton Demolition.

== Mascot ==
The Demonz mascot, Bonez, was believed to be the skeleton of Blade, mascot of the Dayton Gems.

== Season-by-season record ==
Note: GP = Games played, W = Wins, L = Losses, OTL = Overtime losses, Pts = Points, PCT = Points percentage, GF = Goals for, GA = Goals against, PIM = Penalty infraction minutes

Season	GP	W	L	OTL	Pts	PCT	GF	GA	PIM	Coach(es)	Result
2012–13	51	42	6	3	123	0.804	320	183	931	Marc LeFebvre	Lost in Finals
2013–14	57	40	14	3	116	0.678	278	181	1494	Trevor Karasiewicz	Won Commissioner's Cup
2014–15	56	38	14	4	113	0.673	279	174	1001	Trevor Karasiewicz	Lost in First Round

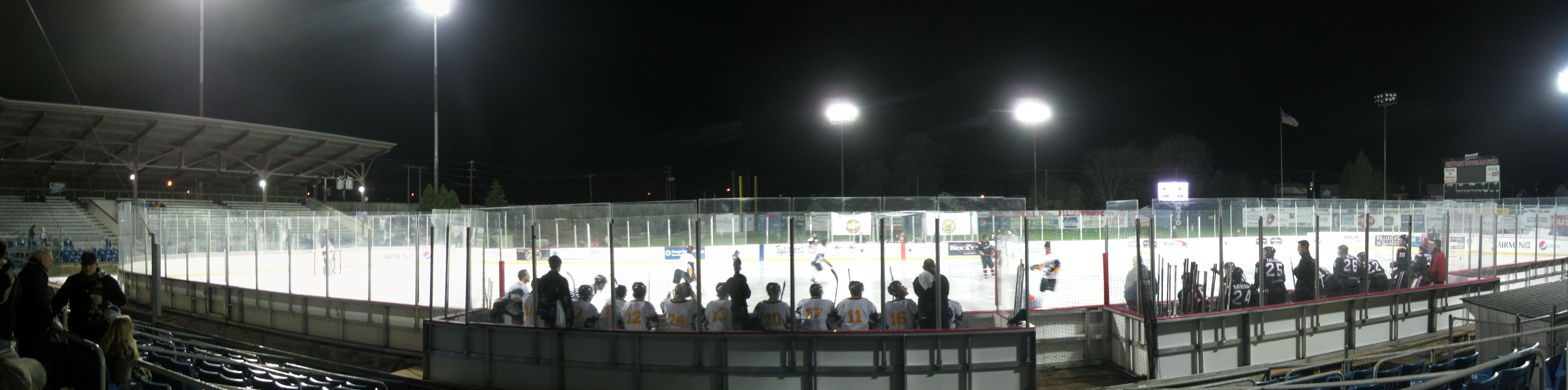
The Dayton Demonz in action against the Williamsport Outlaws, outdoors at Airmen Pond at Bowman Field in Williamsport, Pennsylvania.
