= Port Huron Prowlers =

Sports team

- City: Port Huron, Michigan
- League: Federal Prospects Hockey League
- Division: Continental
- Founded: 2015
- Home arena: McMorran Arena
- Colors: Red, white, black, yellow
- Owner: Ken Andrews
- General manager: Matt Graham
- Head coach: Matt Graham
- Captain: Austin Fetterly
- Media: Port Huron Times Herald

Franchise history
- 2015–present: Port Huron Prowlers

Championships
- Regular season titles: 1 (2017–18)
- Playoff championships: 1 (2015–16)

The Port Huron Prowlers are a minor professional ice hockey team in the Federal Prospects Hockey League that began play in the 2015–16 season. Based in Port Huron, Michigan, the Prowlers play their home games at the McMorran Arena.

== History ==
The Federal Hockey League (FHL) held a regular season game at McMorran Arena on January 31, 2015 between the Danbury Whalers and the Danville Dashers. 1,709 fans saw the Dashers defeat the Whalers by a score of 4–1, leading the FHL to strongly consider Port Huron as a market and seek out ownership for a franchise there.

Two months later, on April 2, it was announced that the FHL's newest franchise would be based in Port Huron, making it the tenth hockey team to call Port Huron and the McMorran Arena home and the FHL's first Michigan team. Barry Soskin of Arlington Heights, Illinois, who also owned the Danville Dashers and Dayton Demonz FHL teams, serves as the team's owner. A name-the-team contest was held, with the Prowlers name, logo and colors being announced on June 5. On July 16, the Prowlers announced that the protected player list from the Dayton Demonz had been transferred to their team when Soskin folded his Dayton team.

The Prowlers won their first FHL championship in their 2015–16 inaugural season, sweeping the Danbury Titans 3–0 in a best-of-five series concluding on April 22, 2016 at McMorran Arena.

On January 7, 2017, the Prowlers surprisingly fired inaugural head coach Trevor Karasiewicz after leading the team a 8–10–1–5 record in 2016–17 and to the championship the previous season. He was replaced by Joe Pace, Sr. as the interim head coach. Pace Sr. stayed on as head coach for the 2017–18 season. He led the team to a regular season title and a berth in the Commissioner's Cup Finals where they lost to the Watertown Wolves.

The following 2018–19 season, Pace Sr. was hired as the head coach of the Mentor Ice Breakers FHL expansion team. He was replaced as head coach and general manager of the Prowlers by his son, Joe Pace, Jr. who had previously been a Prowlers' player, assistant coach, and assistant general manager. In 2018, the FHL began calling itself the Federal Prospects Hockey League (FPHL) and fully rebranded before the 2019–20 season.

Following the abbreviated 2020–21 season, Pace Jr. left the team and was replaced as head coach and general manager by former assistant Matt Graham.

In January 2025, ahead of a future expansion of the FPHL into Topeka, Kansas, the Prowlers played a neutral site games against the Danville Dashers while branded as the "Topeka Road Runners", in honor of the former NAHL team of the same name.

== Season-by-season records ==
Season	GP	W	L	OTL	Pts (Note: 3 points for a Win, 2 points for an Overtime Win, and 1 point for an Overtime Loss)	Pct	GF	GA	PIM	Finish	Playoffs
2015–16	55	29	18	1	102	.618	262	218	1348	2nd of 6, FHL	Won FHL Championships, 3–0 vs. Danbury Titans
2016–17	56	26	21	9	84	.500	224	213	916	5th of 7, FHL	Did not qualify
2017–18	53	44	7	2	131	.824	246	131	863	1st of 7, FHL	Lost FHL Championships, 1–3 vs. Watertown Wolves
2018–19	59	25	32	2	74	.418	237	271	1155	4th of 6, FHL	Lost Semifinals, 0–2 vs. Carolina Thunderbirds
2019–20	46	32	14	0	92	.667	212	166	777	2nd of 5, Western	Season cancelled (Note: League cancelled season due to the COVID-19 pandemic.)
2020–21	24	8	14	2	26	.361	77	122	551	4th of 6, FPHL	Lost in Quarterfinals
2021-22	54	18	32	4	56	.346	191	256	1054	6th of 7, FPHL	Lost Div. Quarterfinals 0-1-1 vs. Carolina Thunderbirds (FPHL)
2022-23	56	28	24	4	86	.512	232	231	1190	4th of 5th, FPHL CONTINENTAL Div.	Lost Div. Quarterfinals 0-1-1 vs. Carolina Thunderbirds (FPHL)
2023-24	56	28	22	6	84	.500	196	207	1231	3rd of 6th, FPHL CONTINENTAL Div.	Lost Div. Quarterfinals 1-1-1 vs. Carolina Thunderbirds (FPHL)
