= Danbury Whalers =

- City: Danbury, Connecticut
- League: Federal Hockey League
- Founded: 2010
- Home arena: Danbury Ice Arena
- Colors: Green, white, navy
- Owners: Danbury Whalers LLC; Alan Friedman - Senior Partner, President, CFO (owner of the Whaler TM); Herm Sorcher - CEO/Managing Partner; Lawrence Sorcher - Chairman
- Head coach: Phil Esposito
- Media: The News-Times
- Website: thedanburywhalers.com

Franchise history
- 2010–present: Danbury Whalers

Championships
- Regular season titles: 1 (2013–14)
- Playoff championships: 1 (2012–13)

The Danbury Whalers were a minor league professional ice hockey team in the Federal Hockey League that began play in the 2010–11 season. Based in Danbury, Connecticut, the Whalers played at the Danbury Ice Arena, located in CityCenter Danbury. Their name comes from the Hartford Whalers, who were a professional ice hockey team based in Connecticut and played in Hartford from 1975 to 1997 before relocating to North Carolina as the Carolina Hurricanes.

Until the 2014–15 season, the Danbury Whalers were an affiliate of the Evansville IceMen of the ECHL.

== History ==
On March 22, 2013, the Whalers won their first FHL Commissioner's Cup Title by sweeping the Dayton Demonz in front of a home standing-room only crowd of 3,116 fans.

On April 3, 2015, the Danbury Ice Arena The Whalers led the FHL home attendance for the league's first five seasons.

On June 3, 2015, due to city council’s overpriced security demands of the Danbury Whalers, the Federal Hockey League announced the team would be sold or moved to Brewster, New York, to be called the Stateline Whalers, and would play at the Brewster Ice The team was announced as being owned by Alan Friedman and Herm Sorcher, with Barry Soskin as a minority owner. The Danbury Whalers were officially considered to be on hiatus for the season by the FHL but gave up their naming and territorial rights to Brewster.

On June 27, it was reported that the FHL had approved of a new team in Danbury, Connecticut, to replace the departed Whalers. Local businessmen, Bruce Bennett and Edward Crowe were announced as the ownership group. Bennett would announce the new team as the Danbury Titans and had signed a six-year lease to play at the Danbury Ice Arena. Unfortunately, they were not able to do what the Whalers had accomplished, and were forced to cease operations.

== Season-by-season record ==
Season	GP	W	L	OTL	Pts	GF	GA	Finish	Playoffs
2010–11	47	24	18	5	53	184	173	4th of 6 FHL	Lost in 1st round series (2-3 vs. New York Aviators)
2011–12	51	30	20	1	89	207	185	3rd of 8 FHL	Lost in FHL Finals series (0-3 vs. New Jersey Outlaws)
2012–13	51	28	17	6	86	218	188	2nd of 4 FHL	Won FHL Championship Series (3-0 vs. Dayton Demonz)
2013–14	56	37	11	8	117	241	160	1st of 4 FHL	Lost in FHL Finals series (2-3 vs. Dayton Demonz)
2014–15	54	27	21	6	84	204	186	4th of 6 FHL	Lost in FHL Semifinals series (1-2 vs Watertown Wolves)

== See also ==
- Professional Hockey In Connecticut
