= Vermont Wild =

- City: Morrisville, Vermont
- League: Federal Hockey League
- Operated: 2011
- Home arena: Green Mountain Arena
- Colors: Green, Silver, Black, White
- Owner: Randall Latona
- General manager: Graham Kirk

Franchise history
- 2011: Vermont Wild
- 2011: Green Mountain Rock Crushers

Championships
- Regular season titles: 0

The Vermont Wild was a team in the Federal Hockey League in the 2011-12 season. Based in Morrisville, Vermont, the team — originally dubbed the Green Mountain Rock Crushers — played their home games at the Green Mountain Arena. Both the team and the arena were owned by Randall J. Latona, a former owner of the Rochester Americans of the American Hockey League and the Rochester Knighthawks of the National Lacrosse League. The Wild was the only professional ice hockey team ever to be based in the state of Vermont.

On November 25, 2011, after playing only 10 of their 53 scheduled games, the Federal Hockey League announced that the Vermont Wild had folded.

== Season-by-season record ==
Federal Hockey League

Season	GP	W	L	OTL	PTS	GF	GA	PIM	Finish
2011-12	10	3	6	1	9	43	65	229	-
