= Watertown Wolves =

- City: Watertown, New York
- League: Federal Prospects Hockey League
- Division: Empire
- Founded: 2010
- Home arena: Northern Credit Union Community Arena (Capacity: 1523)
- Owners: Dan Drake, Jadzia Drake
- General manager: Candi Churchill
- Head coach: Brent Clarke

Franchise history
- 2010–2013: 1000 Islands Privateers
- 2013–2014: Watertown Privateers
- 2014–present: Watertown Wolves

Championships
- Regular season titles: 2 (2014–15, 2021–22)
- Playoff championships: 3 (2015, 2018, 2022)

The Watertown Wolves are a minor professional hockey team in the Federal Prospects Hockey League (FPHL) based in Watertown, New York, and play home games at the Watertown Municipal Arena. The team was on hiatus during the 2015–16 season while renovations at the Watertown Municipal Arena were completed and then returned for the 2016–17 season. With a history dating to 2010, the Wolves are the last original franchise in the FPHL.

== History ==
=== Privateers ===
The organization was one of the founding teams in the Federal Hockey League (FHL) and majority owned by Nicole Kirnan, the daughter of league commissioner Don Kirnan. The team was originally known as the 1000 Islands Privateers and played at the Bonnie Castle Recreation Center in Alexandria Bay, New York, for two seasons before moving to Watertown for the 2012–13 season. On March 1, 2013, Privateers' owner and president Nicole Kirnan served as the team's coach for the last five games of the season, making her the first woman to head coach a professional hockey team in the United States, when coach Paul Kelly returned to playing for the team.

Before the 2013–14 season, the Privateers revamped their identity by changing their name to the Watertown Privateers and redesigning their jerseys and logo. Brad Zangs was brought in as new head coach.

=== Wolves ===
Watertown's FHL team returned for the 2014–15 with new ownership after the previous owners decided not to continue. The team rechristened itself as the Watertown Wolves during this season. In their first season, the Wolves won both the regular season and the playoffs championship. First-year head coach Brent Clarke was named FHL Coach of the Year, but resigned after the season.

The Wolves suspended operations for the 2015–16 season to allow for the Watertown Municipal Arena to be renovated; the team attempted to find another arena in northern New York, but were unable to find an available venue. The renovations were completed on schedule and the Wolves signed a new one-year lease agreement with the city of Watertown in order to return after one season off.

The Wolves returned for the 2016–17 season and hired Phil Esposito as head coach.

Prior to the 2017–18 season, the franchise was purchased by IDHL, LLC., a subsidiary of the FHL and an organization that had announced to be operating a developmental league as a feeder system for the FHL called the International Developmental Hockey League. The IDHL put off launching the new league to instead focus solely on operating the Wolves. The shareholders in Top Shelf Hockey eventually left the Wolves organization outright later in the offseason stating they had grown exhausted over the major financial and emotional investments they were making in the franchise.

The new owners did not retain Esposito as coach and instead hired Trevor Karasiewicz for the 2017–18 season, where he led the team to a league championship in his first season. After his second season, he left for the head coaching position with the Fresno Monsters, a junior team in the Western States Hockey League. Former Danville Dashers coach Paul MacLean was brought in as his replacement for the 2019–20 season. Also during the 2019 offseason, the league officially rebranded as the Federal Prospects Hockey League (FPHL). Due to the onset of the COVID-19 pandemic during 2019–20 season, the regular season was curtailed and the playoffs were cancelled.

The franchise was sold again in 2020 with entrepreneur Andreas Johansson as majority owner and league commissioner Don Kirnan staying on in a minority role. The team then brought back Brent Clarke as head coach for the 2020–21 season. With the ongoing restrictions amidst the pandemic, the FPHL announced that the Elmira Enforcers and Watertown would be the only two teams to start the season on February 3, 2021. The two teams played three exhibition games at the end of January before heading to Watertown for the start of their Summit Series. However, the game was cancelled with the Wolves awarded a forfeit win due to a pregame altercation after an Elmira player attempted to enter the Wolves locker room, leading to the police being called to the arena. The altercation led to the entire 16-game February series between the two teams to be cancelled. When the FPHL launched the rest of the 2020–21 season on February 19, the Wolves opted to not participate in the season due to ice unavailability in their arena during the spring.

The team returned to play for the 2021–22 season and won their second championship by beating Columbus in three games of a best-of-three series as Lane King won it in the second overtime of the decisive game.

After the season, Andreas Johansson sold the team to 4 investors to give local ownership to the team. The Wolves unveiled new jerseys and a new color scheme to their logo prior to the 2022–23 season. In August 2022, Brent Clarke was named Head Coach of the Knoxville Ice Bears. Team President Curtis Mosely would take over as General Manager, while former defenseman Justin Coachman, a member of the 2018 and 2022 championship teams would be the team's next head coach. Moseley stepped down in 2023, and would be replaced by team captain Charlie Pens Jr. as GM.

On December 19, 2024, the Wolves announced that they had relieved Charlie Pens, Jr. of duties as head coach. Justin Coachman would assume all duties immediately.

== Season-by-season records ==
Season	GP	W	L	OTL	SOL	Pts (Note: Except for the 2010–11 season, the FHL awards 3 points for a regulation time win, 2 points for an overtime win, and 1 point for an overtime or shootout loss)	Finish	Playoffs
2010–11	44	26	13	5	0	57	3rd of 6	Lost Semifinals, 1–3 vs. Akwesasne Warriors
2011–12	49	29	15	1	1	95	2nd of 8	Won First Round, 2–1 vs. Akwesasne Warriors; Lost Second Round, 0–2 vs. Danbury Whalers
2012–13	53	18	26	2	2	68	3rd of 6	Lost Semifinals, 0–3 vs. Danbury Whalers
2013–14	56	15	32	4	—	59	3rd of 4	Lost Semifinals, 1–2 vs. Dayton Demonz
2014–15	54	32	13	3	—	111	1st of 6	Won Semifinals, 2–1 vs. Danbury Whalers; Won Finals, 3–2 vs. Danville Dashers
2016–17	56	27	23	4	—	89	4th of 7	Lost Semifinals, 1–2 vs. Danville Dashers
2017–18	52	29	12	5	—	104	2nd of 7	Won Semifinals, 2–0 vs. Carolina Thunderbirds; Won Finals, 3–1 vs. Port Huron Prowlers
2018–19	58	24	16	1	—	87	3rd of 6	Lost Semifinals, 0–2 vs. Elmira Enforcers
2019–20	48	22	21	2	—	74	3rd of 5, Eastern 6th of 10, Overall	Season cancelled (Note: 2019–20 season cancelled due to the COVID-19 pandemic.)
2021-22	59	43	12	2	2	129	1st of 7	Won Semifinals, 2–0 vs. Carolina Thunderbirds; Won Finals, 2–1 vs. Columbus River Dragons
2022-23	56	20	32	1	3	57	3rd of 5, Empire 7th of 10, Overall	Lost Division Semifinals, 0–2 vs. Binghamton Black Bears
2023-24	56	19	31	3	3	61	4th of 5, Empire 7th of 11, Overall	Lost Division Semifinals, 0–2 vs. Binghamton Black Bears
