= Berlin River Drivers =

- City: Berlin, New Hampshire
- League: Federal Hockey League
- Operated: 2015–2017
- Home arena: Notre Dame Arena
- Colors: Chocolate Brown, beige, black
- Owner: Lenny Lichtman
- Media: The Berlin Daily Sun

Franchise history
- 2015–2017: Berlin River Drivers

The Berlin River Drivers were a minor professional ice hockey team in the Federal Hockey League that began play in the 2015–16 season. Based in Berlin, New Hampshire, the River Drivers played their home games at the Notre Dame Arena.

== History ==
On July 14, 2014, the FHL announced the River Drivers as a new franchise. However, on September 8, 2014, the league announced that the league would expand instead into North Adams, Massachusetts (with the Berkshire Battalion), citing the market to be a better fit but not ruling out Berlin and the River Drivers' return for the 2015–16 season.

The following offseason, on May 20, 2015, the FHL announced the River Drivers would begin play in the 2015–16 season at the newly renovated Notre Dame Arena. They initially announced an affiliation with the Evansville IceMen of the ECHL for the 2015–16 season, however, sometime before the season began the post and all references to the IceMen had been removed from the website.

After making it the championship in the 2016–17 season, the Berlin River Drivers ceased operations due to the increased overhead costs of running the team and not selling enough season tickets for the following season. In order to play the 2017–18 season, the team claimed it needed to sell 1,000 season tickets upfront in order to have enough money to operate. Their arena only had a capacity of 1,680.
