= Federal Prospects Hockey League =

American ice hockey league

- Current season, competition or edition: 2026-27 FPHL season
- Federal Prospects Hockey League
- Sport: Ice hockey
- Founded: 2009
- First season: 2010-11
- Commissioner: Don Kirnan
- No. of teams: 17
- Country: United States
- Most recent champion: Binghamton Black Bears (2026)
- Most titles: Watertown Wolves and Binghamton Black Bears (3 each)
- Website: federalhockey.com

The Federal Prospects Hockey League (FPHL) is a professional ice hockey independent minor league with teams in the Western, Midwestern, Southern, and Northeastern United States. The FPHL began operations in November 2010 as the Federal Hockey League. Don Kirnan is the league's commissioner. The league also occasionally branded itself as the Federal Professional Hockey League from 2015 to 2018 until it began using the name Federal Prospects Hockey League and completing the rebrand in 2019.

== History ==
=== 2010-11: inaugural season ===
In its inaugural season, the league had a salary cap of $5,050 per week. The roster was limited to 20 players for the first six games and 17 thereafter.

A handful of National Hockey League (NHL) players and draft picks joined the ranks, most notably Pierre Dagenais and Billy Tibbetts. Dagenais, who played 142 games for the New Jersey Devils, Montreal Canadiens and Florida Panthers, played two seasons for the Akwesasne Warriors amassing 107 goals and 197 points in 68 regular season games, and helped Akwesasne win the first Commissioner's Cup. Tibbetts, who played the role of an enforcer in his brief 82 game NHL career, mostly with the Pittsburgh Penguins, played for the Cape Cod Bluefins in 2011–12, scoring 10 goals, 40 points, and 109 PIM in only 15 games.

During the 2010–11 season, the Broome County Barons relocated to Cape Cod due to lack of fan support, and Rome Frenzy suspended operations mid-season.

Akwesasne won the first Commissioner's Cup title with a 3–1 series win over the New York Aviators.

=== 2011-12 ===
In February 2011, the FHL announced it would add new teams in Morrisville, Vermont, and Danville, Illinois, later named the Green Mountain Rock Crushers and the Danville Dashers, respectively. In May, the FHL announced an expansion team in Wayne, New Jersey, called the New Jersey Outlaws. By June, the FHL had been unable to establish a team in Vermont and included the Niagara Falls Nationals with the Dashers and Outlaws in an expansion draft. But by July 2011, the Nationals were gone and the Green Mountain Rock Crushers (which later changed its name to the Vermont Wild in September) were re-added to the schedule. In December 2011, the FHL announced that the Vermont Wild had folded and a new team, the Delaware Federals, would replace them on the schedule as a road-only team; the Federals played their first game on December 16, 2011, against Cape Cod.

The New Jersey Outlaws won the FHL title by sweeping the Danbury Whalers in three games.

=== 2012-13 ===
In May 2012, it was announced that the Brooklyn Aviators were ceasing operations and that an expansion team was being added in Dayton, Ohio, the Dayton Demonz (originally announced as the Dayton Devils) at the Hara Arena. The Dayton expansion draft and the Brooklyn player dispersal draft were both held on June 15.

In July, it was announced that the defending champion New Jersey Outlaws were relocating to Williamsport, Pennsylvania, after only one season in New Jersey. Rather than playing in a traditional ice arena, they played outside on an ice rink at Bowman Field, home to the minor league baseball team the Williamsport Crosscutters. This venture was unsuccessful as the team folded on January 21, 2013, only to be resurrected by the league as the Pennsylvania Blues, a travel team that played four road games to fill in other teams' home schedules for the remainder of the season.

On December 15, 2012, control of the Cape Cod Bluefins was transferred to the league and renamed the New York Bluefins with the intent to play home games in Syracuse, New York; however the league only used them as a travel team for 13 games and the Bluefins folded at the end of the season.

On January 27, 2013, the first game in FHL history to be completed with no penalties was played between the New York Bluefins and the Danville Dashers at Palmer Arena in Danville, Illinois, a 7–4 Danville win officiated by referee Matt Spaeth.

On March 22, 2013, the Danbury Whalers swept the Dayton Demonz to win the Commissioner's Cup. The attendance at the final game was 3,116, the largest single-game attendance in the history of the league.

=== 2013-14 ===
The FHL played with four teams for the season, and in a bid for expansion played neutral site games in Winston-Salem, North Carolina, and Connellsville, Pennsylvania. Dayton Demonz forward Ahmed Mahfouz led the league in scoring and was the league's Most Valuable Player. The Danville Dashers twice were the center of national sports attention, first in a brawl during a game against the Watertown Privateers in which a collision between Danville goalie Nick Niedert and Watertown enforcer Jeff Dill took place, sparking a brawl, and soon spilled between benches, and punches were briefly thrown between Danville coach Mike Kellermeyer and Privateers coach Brad Zangs. Officials managed to get the situation under control thanks to the arrival of local police. The next meeting between the two teams resulted in a sellout at Watertown Municipal Arena, but there were no further incidents.

The Dayton Demonz won the first series over the Watertown Privateers, two games to one, to play top seeded Danbury in the finals. Danbury won the first two games of the finals, with game one in overtime from a goal by Igor Karlov. Back in Dayton for game three, the Demonz sported new jerseys. Mike Brown, a Boston Bruins draft pick from the early 2000s, was injured and Kevin Hoy took over in net for Danbury. Dayton captain Brian Marks scored in overtime to force a fourth game, which Dayton also won. Dayton won game five and the Commissioner's Cup in a 9–2 victory. Jeff Rose was awarded the playoff MVP award.

==== Staged fight incident ====
In the final game of the regular season between Danville and Dayton, two friends and former teammates decided to stage a fight in the third period. With a 4-0 Danville lead and less than 10 minutes to go, Jesse Felten and Matt Puntureri squared off at center ice, and as punches would have been thrown, both players hugged it out instead. Next, Puntureri pulled a can of beer from his pads, opened it, and in each other's embrace, the two skated around center ice toasting the crowd to mixed reactions. The league announced that Felten would be suspended for the remainder of the season and the playoffs, and he took a year off of organized hockey before returning to the FHL to play for Dayton in the 2015–16 season. No immediate discipline for Puntureri was announced, since it was Danville's last game of the season. Puntureri later stated that he believed he would be banned for life, which turned out to be correct; as he never played another professional game in North America.

=== 2014-15 ===
The FHL awarded a new franchise to play in Southwest Pennsylvania to begin play in the 2014–15 season, named the Southwest Pennsylvania Magic. The Magic were to play at the Rostraver Ice Garden in Belle Vernon, Pennsylvania. This brought the league to five teams and mark the FHL's return to Pennsylvania. In an interview, commissioner Don Kirnan stated he hoped to see as many as 7–8 teams in the FHL by the next season. However, after playing one game in which they lost 10–2 to the Berkshire Battalion, the Magic's membership in the league was revoked due to financial problems. They were replaced, under new ownership, by the Steel City Warriors, again located in Belle Vernon.

On July 14, 2014, the FHL announced another new franchise to begin play in Berlin, New Hampshire, to be called the Berlin River Drivers. However, on September 8, 2014, the league announced that the league would expand instead into North Adams, Massachusetts, with the Berkshire Battalion, citing the market to be a better fit.

During the previous season, a group of local investors worked to purchase the Watertown Privateers, owned by Don Kirnan. On May 14, 2014, news circulated that the owners group, named Top Shelf Hockey, LLC and led by local businessman Stanley Tibbles, had acquired Kirnan's franchise rights and started a new team, eventually named the Watertown Wolves.

On October 30, 2014, it was announced that a neutral site game would take place on January 31, 2015, in Port Huron, Michigan, at McMorran Place, with an eye towards future expansion into Port Huron. The Danville Dashers defeated the Danbury Whalers 4–1 in the Port Huron game. The attendance at the game was 1,709.

The Watertown Wolves captured first place by the end of regular season and were followed by the Dayton Demonz in second place. The Danville Dashers finished in third followed by the Danbury Whalers who finished in fourth. The Wolves won the FHL championship in the playoffs over the Dashers in a five-game series.

=== 2015-16 ===
On April 2, 2015, the FHL announced an expansion team, the Port Huron Prowlers, to begin play in the 2015–16 season.

On April 3, 2015, the Danbury Ice Arena announced that it did not want to renew its contract with the Danbury Whalers and gave them a notice to evict by April 17, leaving the last remaining team from the inaugural FHL season homeless.

On April 17, 2015, the Steel City Warriors announced that it had suspended operations, stating that the team was unable to find a suitable home arena, but had hopes to return for the 2016–17 season.

Also in April 2015, the FHL lost a lawsuit in which the league was ordered to pay former player Kyler Moje a sum of $800,000, after Moje became legally blind due to an injury incurred during a game on February 10, 2012. The FHL would appeal the judgment, citing that their lawyer never properly filed their legal response, but lost the appeal leading to speculation that the current league would have to fold in order to avoid the payment.

On May 20, 2015, the Berlin River Drivers announced their resurrection as the FHL's 7th team, to play at Notre Dame Arena in Berlin, New Hampshire. A year prior, the River Drivers were slated to join the FHL in 2014–15 before the league reassessed their options and expanded into North Adams, MA instead.

On June 3, 2015, due to the eviction of the Danbury Whalers, the Federal Hockey League announced a new team based in Brewster, New York, to be called the Stateline Whalers, and would play at the Brewster Ice Arena under former the Danbury Whalers CEO and managing partner Herm Sorcher. The Stateline Whalers were announced as being owned by Barry Soskin, who also owns the Port Huron and Danville teams and formerly owned the Dayton Demonz. The Danbury Whalers were officially considered to be on hiatus for the season by the FHL, but gave up their naming and territorial rights to Brewster.

On June 22, 2015, the Watertown Wolves announced that they would suspend operations for the 2015–16 season due to their arena being renovated and an inability to find a temporary arena to use in Northern New York. The Wolves plan to resume operations for the 2016–17 season, after their arena renovations are completed.

On June 26, 2015, the owner of the Berkshire Battalion, Williams Dadds, announced that he intends to relocate the team from North Adams, Massachusetts, before the 2015–16 season after lease negotiations for the ice rink fell through. The city administration asked the team to only play a maximum of three Friday night games next season and repay all current debts prior to any lease being signed by the city but Dadds decided that the demands were unreasonable.

On June 27, it was reported that the FHL had approved of a new team Danbury, Connecticut, to replace the now departed Whalers. Local businessmen, Bruce Bennett and Edward Crowe were announced as the ownership group. Bennett would announce the new team as the Danbury Titans and had signed a six-year lease to play at the Danbury Ice Arena. On July 15, during the team's inaugural booster club meeting, Danbury Titans ownership confirmed that the league had re-organized and they will own the new Brewster team (formerly announced as the Stateline Whalers); Barry Soskin will continue to own the Danville Dashers and Port Huron Prowlers, but no longer be involved in Brewster. On July 18, Bennett announced the team would be called the Brewster Bulldogs and that neither of his teams would be connected to the former Whalers.

On July 15, the Battalion announced via their Facebook page that the team was moving to Dayton, Ohio, to replace the Dayton Demonz. On July 16, the Port Huron Prowlers announced that the protected player list from the Demonz had been transferred to their team and officially announcing the end of the Demonz. In the same press release, the Prowlers also confirmed that Dadds would be relocating the Battalion to Dayton and play in Hara Arena. On July 25, Dadds announced his Dayton team would be called the Dayton Demolition.

On December 23, the Dayton Demolition announced that it had postponed its December 26 game against Danbury due to "scheduling issues" with Hara Arena. On December 28, the Demolition then announced that its new home arena would be South Metro Sports, a recreation center with a seating capacity of approximately 200, in nearby Centerville, Ohio. After one home game at South Metro, the Demolition returned to Hara Arena. On January 17, the FHL removed Dadds as owner and on January 19, Joe Pace Sr., the former coach of the Danville Dashers, was announced as the head of the new ownership group for the Demolition.

At the conclusion of the regular season, Danbury, Danville, Dayton, and Port Huron qualified for the playoffs. Port Huron would sweep the regular season champion Danbury Titans for the Commissioner's Cup.

=== 2016-17 ===
The Watertown Wolves completed renovations to their ice rink and signed a new one-year lease agreement with the city of Watertown in order to return after one season off. In addition, the league expanded to St. Clair Shores, Michigan (Metro Detroit) with the new St. Clair Shores Fighting Saints, playing out of the St. Clair Shores Civic Arena.

On July 13, 2016, the "Dayton Pro Hockey" team, formerly known as the Dayton Demolition before removing references of the Demolition name in March 2016, announced it would be going dormant for the 2016–17 season. Owner Joe Pace Sr. claimed that Hara Arena was unable to sign leases to tenants and he did not believe he could put together a team without a proper lead up time and secured arena. He also stated he would look to keep the team in Dayton in 2017 even if Hara Arena is still not available. Hara Arena would end up closing permanently in August 2016.

In June 2016, Brewster Bulldogs owner, Bruce Bennett mentioned to The News-Times that he would solely focus on his Danbury Titans team and would no longer be involved with the Bulldogs. Without finding new ownership, Bennett decided to suspend Bulldogs operations on July 14, 2016.

On September 14, the city of Cornwall, Ontario, approved a team called the Cornwall Nationals to begin play for the 2016–17 season out of the Ed Lumley Arena. On September 16, the FHL approved of the addition to the league for the upcoming season. The new team replaces the recently folded Cornwall River Kings and is led by Mitch Gagne and Rodney Rivette.

=== 2017-18 ===
The first expansion team of the 2017-18 season was announced in August 2016 as the Carolina Thunderbirds in Winston-Salem, North Carolina.

In February 2017, the FHL announced it was partnering with a developmental league called the International Developmental Hockey League (IDHL) for the 2017–18 season. It was originally intended to be focused on players between the ages of 20 and 23 who had aged out of junior leagues. At one point, the league website listed teams called the Baldwinsville Bandits, Elmira Express, Newark Diamonds, Palmyra Battalion, Syracuse Crush, and Watertown Whalers. The league held a tryout camp on June 15, 2017, for prospective players. However, on June 26, the IDHL then announced it would not play and instead purchased the Watertown Wolves when the team's local ownership group, said to be exhausted from the emotional investment in running a professional sports franchise, backed out.

After making it to the championship in the 2016–17 season, the Berlin River Drivers ceased operations due to the increased overhead costs of running the team and not selling enough season tickets for the following season. The Danbury Titans would also fold for citing overhead costs and specifically workers' compensation insurance in Connecticut.

When the schedule was released for the season, the Fighting Saints were listed with home games in Gravenhurst, Ontario, Témiscaming, Quebec, South River, Ontario, and Kingsville, Ontario. They were eventually announced to have relocated to Kingsville as the North Shore Knights. By December 2017, the Knights would forfeit or attempt to reschedule most of their home games before the team would forfeit all remaining home games after February 11. At the end of March, the Knights released all players and staff.

The Cornwall Nationals folded during the season due to lack of funds despite sitting in second place at the time. The five Nationals' games that were to take place against the Watertown Wolves were replaced by a travel-only team called the Northern Federals. All other games were immediately considered forfeits and were cancelled.

=== 2018-19 ===
On July 17, 2018, Robbie Nichols announced he had acquired an expansion team in Elmira, New York, called the Elmira Enforcers, one year after the Elmira Jackals had ceased operations. In the same press conference, FHL commissioner Kirnan confirmed that North Shore was not returning. The following week, the league announced another expansion team in Mentor, Ohio, called the Mentor Ice Breakers to bring the league back to six teams. The league also slightly altered its primary logo, changing the branding from Federal Professional Hockey League to Federal Prospects Hockey League, while still using the FHL abbreviation.

On March 10, 2019, Enforcers' owner Nichols assaulted a referee after the first period of a game against the Carolina Thunderbirds. The game was immediately cancelled by the officials, and subsequently led the FHL's officiating supervisor resigning from the league and pulling all the referees from the FHL citing the need to protect his personnel. Nichols was issued the league-maximum fine of $25,000. The league then recruited local officials for the remaining games.

The Thunderbirds and Enforcers met again in the league championships, with the Thunderbirds opening the series with winning the first two games. In the second game, the Thunderbirds won in overtime with a game-winning goal landing on the back of the Enforcers' goaltender and then fell across the goal line when he got up. The Enforcers heavily contested the call, with team-leading scorer Ahmed Mahfouz verbally confronting the officials and leading to a physical altercation between head coach Brent Clarke and a linesman. Mahfouz then broke his stick over the goalpost and tossed it over the glass into the stands before leaving the ice. Finally, Enforcers' goaltender Passingham was still disputing the goal with the official before leaving for the visitor's locker room, with the walkway passing directly next the fans, and a fan threw a filled cup at Passingham. Passingham then attacked the fan before they were eventually separated. Clarke, Mahfouz, and Passingham were all suspended by the league: Mahfouz for one game, Passingham for two, and Clarke for five games. The Enforcers then won the next game before the Thunderbirds won the championship in game four.

=== 2019-20 ===
Following the 2018–19 season, the league fully branded itself as the Federal Prospects Hockey League with a new FPHL logo. Between May and July 2019, the league announced four expansion teams: the Battle Creek Rumble Bees of Battle Creek, Michigan; the Columbus River Dragons of Columbus, Georgia; the Danbury Hat Tricks of Danbury, Connecticut; and the Delaware Thunder of Harrington, Delaware. On March 16, 2020, the league canceled the remainder of the 2019–20 season schedule due to the COVID-19 pandemic.

=== 2020-21 ===
The league announced two expansion teams: an unnamed team in Bloomington, Illinois, and the Motor City Rockers in Fraser, Michigan. However, both teams eventually withdrew from the 2020–21 season. The start of the 2020–21 season was postponed several times amidst the ongoing capacity and travel restrictions in the pandemic into 2021. The Delaware Thunder also withdrew while the Mentor Ice Breakers folded entirely. On January 12, 2021, the league planned to start its season on February 3 with Elmira and Watertown and staggered starts for the other members as they are cleared to play. Elmira and Watertown played three exhibition games at the end of January before traveling to Watertown for the February 3 game. However, the game was cancelled with the Wolves awarded a forfeit win due to a pregame altercation after an Elmira player attempted to enter the Wolves locker room, leading to the police being called to the arena. The remainder of the Elmira/Watertown series was then cancelled and no further games were scheduled until other teams would be able to participate.

On February 11, the league announced the start of a four-team season beginning of February 19 consisting of Carolina, Columbus, Elmira, and Port Huron, with Carolina playing all games on the road. The schedule left room for the return of other teams. The league also stated there would be an end-of-season tournament, but it would not be for the Commissioner's Cup. The postseason was announced as the Ignite Cup, a five-game series between the top two teams that had played at least 16 regular season games.

By March, Danbury had opted out of the season and Danville had lost their home arena when it was replaced by a Southern Professional Hockey League expansion team.

=== 2021-22 ===
For the 2021-22 season, Delaware, Watertown and Danbury all returned, while Motor City stayed on hiatus. Elmira was barred from their arena, as the team's lease ended with First Arena and the CCIDA, which put the Enforcers dormant for the 2021–22 season. Watertown owner Andreas Johansson brought a team back to Binghamton after the relocation of the Binghamton Devils AHL franchise. Named the Black Bears, the team plays at the Visions Veterans Memorial Arena.

The top six teams qualified for the playoffs, with the top two seeds getting byes in the first round. The top-seeded team in each round picked the team they would play. All rounds were set to be best-of-three. In the first round, #5 seeded Carolina swept #6 seeded Port Huron, while #3 seeded Danbury, beat Binghamton in three. In the second round, Danbury and Carolina were swept by Columbus and Watertown respectively. Putting a best of three series between the Wolves and River Dragons. The two teams split the first two games, setting up for a winner take all third game in Watertown. The game would go the distance and some, as it became the longest game in FPHL history at just over 90 minutes of game action. At the 10:08 mark of Double Overtime, Lane King put home a loose puck past Columbus goalie Bailey MacBurnie to win the series, and win the Wolves' third Commissioners Cup.

Following the season, three new teams were announced: the Elmira Mammoth, Mississippi Sea Wolves, and Motor City Rockers will be coming out of hiatus for the 2022–23 season with new ownership. Mississippi came after the league held three neutral site games in Biloxi, with two of them shattering FPHL attendance records.

=== 2022-23 ===
The league announced two new expansion teams with Elmira returning with new ownership, Mississippi, and the Motor City Rockers coming out of hiatus. In December, the FPHL held three neutral site games at the Raising Cane's River Center Arena in Baton Rouge, Louisiana, where the three games averaged 6,860 each game, for a total of 20,580 fans. Late in the season, the Delaware Thunder's future was uncertain as the Delaware State Fair announced that they were not going to renew the Thunder's lease, leaving the Thunder's status uncertain while they look for a renewal and also work on a future arena in Dover. The Thunder announced that they would decide between going dormant until the arena in Dover is built or relocate temporarily.

In the playoffs, the top 4 teams in each of the two divisions made the playoffs as Carolina swept Port Huron, Columbus swept Motor City in the Continental Division first round. In the Empire Division first round, Danbury and Binghamton swept Elmira and Watertown respectively.

In the Division finals, both series went the distance as Carolina overcame a Game 1 loss to win the next two and move on to their second finals in franchise history. As for the Empire Division, Danbury did the same, losing in Game 1 on the road and then winning the next two at home, a carbon copy of a year prior, as the Hat Tricks moved on to the franchise's first championship series.

In the finals, it was a best-of-five and the Thunderbirds would take the first two games at home. With a two-game stranglehold heading back to Connecticut the 'Birds needed one win to win their second championship. In Game 3, Danbury held strong in front of a franchise-record crowd of 2786 and won 6–2. In Game 4, the Hat Tricks led 4-2 heading into the third before Carolina scored late in the third to make it a one-goal game. With 5.4 seconds left, the clock in the arena had a malfunction and did not start, Carolina would jam one in, however it was distinguished that the puck would've crossed the line after the clock would've hit 0. Therefore, the Hat Tricks were determined the winners and forced a decisive Game 5 the next night. In a close affair, the two teams would go to overtime as Michael Marchesan potted home a rebound at the 11:58 mark of the overtime to give the Hat Tricks their first championship in franchise history.

=== 2023-24 ===
Following the 2022-23 season, the Chemung County, New York IDA evicted Mammoth Sports and Entertainment after it was found that they had not paid $250,000 in utility bills. A few weeks later, it was announced that the FPHL would return to Elmira with the league owning the team. The previous Mammoth roster would be retained and the team would be named the River Sharks. The FPHL also welcomed new teams in Wytheville, Virginia and Baton Rouge, Louisiana. On June 19, 2023, the Delaware Thunder announced they would be electing to go dormant for the 2023–24 season while plans for a new arena in Dover could be finalized. On February 28, 2024, it was announced that the David S. Palmer Arena board had accepted the lease from Barry Soskin and Diane Short to bring the Danville Dashers back for the 2024–25 season.

=== 2024-25 ===
On March 28, 2024, the FPHL announced that an expansion franchise would be awarded to Athens Pro Hockey, who are set to play at the new Akins Ford Arena. On May 15, 2024, the new Athens team announced their name, the Athens Rock Lobsters a nod to the famous Athens based band The B-52s. A day later on May 16, 2024, it was announced that the Elmira River Sharks was bought and relocated to another city in New York, which was set to be announced four days later after talks with First Arena for a second season had died down. May 20, 2024, it was announced the River Sharks new home will be in Poughkeepsie, New York as the Hudson Valley Venom, however it was later announced that the Venom will play at IceTime Sports Complex in Newburgh, New York. On June 5, 2024, it was announced that the Monroe Moccasins were joining the league as the 14th team, playing out of the Monroe Civic Center in Monroe, Louisiana. On June 12, 2024, it was announced that the league would be holding four neutral site games at the Stormont Vail Events Center in Topeka, Kansas. On December 9, 2024, exacerbated by facility issues at their rink in Newburgh, the Hudson Valley Venom were sold to new owners and were renamed as HC Venom and would be playing the remainder of the season at neutral site Northeast United States, specifically New York State. Although on January 2, 2025, it was announced that the Venom would be playing their remaining home games at the McCann Ice Rink inside the Mid-Hudson Civic Center in Poughkeepsie, New York. On January 9, 2025, ahead of the neutral site games in Topeka, it was announced that Topeka would host an FPHL team, starting in 2025-26, owned by Don Lewis and Chris Bryarniarski. On April 15, 2025, it was announced that the Dashers and the City of Danville would part ways, effectively folding the club. On April 18, 2025, it was announced that the FPHL was putting a team in Florence, South Carolina, owned by Monroe owner Parker Moskal. They are set to be a relocation of the HC Venom and will be named after the Pee Dee region. In May 2025, both Pee Dee and Topeka announced their names, the IceCats and Scarecrows respectively, while the Motor City Rockers announced they were re-entering dormancy from play. In addition, the FPHL announced it was putting a team in Columbus, Indiana, known as the Indiana Sentinels.

== Teams ==
=== Current ===
Active and hiatus teams in the FPHL.
- Atlantic Division
- Great Lakes Division
- Delta Division
- Frontier Division
- Dormant & Future

As of the 2026-27 season, the league has teams in California, Connecticut, Georgia, Indiana, Kansas, Louisiana, Michigan, Minnesota, Mississippi, New York, North Carolina, and Virginia.

| Conference | Division | Team | City | Arena | Capacity | Joined | Head coach |
|---|---|---|---|---|---|---|---|
| Eastern | Atlantic | Binghamton Black Bears | Binghamton, New York | Visions Veterans Memorial Arena | 4,750 | 2021 | Brant Sherwood |
| Eastern | Atlantic | Blue Ridge Bobcats | Wytheville, Virginia | Hitachi Energy Arena | 3,700 | 2023 | Vojtech Zemlicka |
| Eastern | Atlantic | Danbury Hat Tricks | Danbury, Connecticut | Danbury Ice Arena | 2,300 | 2019 | John Bierchen |
| Eastern | Atlantic | Twin City Thunderbirds | Winston-Salem, North Carolina | Winston-Salem Fairgrounds Arena | 3,150 | 2016 (Note: Founded as Carolina Thunderbirds, rebranded in 2025.) | Jon Buttitta |
| Eastern | Great Lakes | Indiana Sentinels | Columbus, Indiana | Hamilton Community Center & Ice Arena | 1,150 | 2025 | Everett Thompson |
| Eastern | Great Lakes | Motor City Rockers | Wyandotte, Michigan | Yack Arena | 3,800 | 2022 | Todd Watson |
| Eastern | Great Lakes | Port Huron Prowlers | Port Huron, Michigan | McMorran Place | 2,450 | 2015 | Matt Graham |
| Eastern | Great Lakes | Watertown Wolves | Watertown, New York | Northern Credit Union Community Arena | 1,523 | 2010 (Note: Founded as 1000 Islands Privateers, rebranded to Watertown Privateers after relocation in 2013, then later rebranded to Watertown Wolves in 2014.) | Brent Clarke |
| Western | Delta | Baton Rouge Kingfish | Baton Rouge, Louisiana | Raising Cane's River Center Arena | 7,600 | 2026 | Jimmy Soper |
| Western | Delta | Columbus River Dragons | Columbus, Georgia | Columbus Civic Center | 7,459 | 2019 | Jerome Bechard |
| Western | Delta | Mid-South Monarchs | Southaven, Mississippi | Landers Center | 8,500 | 2026 | Mac Jansen |
| Western | Delta | Monroe Moccasins | Monroe, Louisiana | Monroe Civic Center | 5,600 | 2024 | Russ Parent |
| Western | Frontier | Fresno Falcons | Fresno, California | Selland Arena | 7,750 | 2026 | Iain Duncan |
| Western | Frontier | Minnesota Northern Lights | Thief River Falls, Minnesota | Ralph Engelstad Arena | 3,569 | 2026 | Jeff Jones |
| Western | Frontier | Oceanside Shock | Oceanside, California | Frontwave Arena | 5,500 | 2026 | Craig Carlyle |
| Western | Frontier | Stockton Thunder | Stockton, California | Adventist Health Arena | 9,737 | 2026 | Zach Pochiro |
| Western | Frontier | Topeka Scarecrows | Topeka, Kansas | Stormont Vail Events Center | 7,773 | 2025 | Ahmed Mahfouz |

=== Year-by-year ===
Season year includes the off season and playing season until the championship game.

| Year | Teams | Expansion | Suspended | Relocated | Returned from hiatus | Name changes |
|---|---|---|---|---|---|---|
| 2010-11 | 6 | Akwesasne Warriors; Broome County Barons; Danbury Whalers; New York Aviators; Rome Frenzy; Thousand Islands Privateers | Rome Frenzy* | Broome County Barons → Cape Cod Barons* | | |
| 2011-12 | 8 (Note: Due to mid-season folding, nine total teams played but only eight teams played at any given time.) | Danville Dashers; New Jersey Outlaws; Vermont Wild; Delaware Federals† | Niagara Falls Nationals‡ Vermont Wild* | | | Cape Cod Barons → Cape Cod Bluefins; New York Aviators → Brooklyn Aviators; Green Mountain Rock Crushers‡ → Vermont Wild |
| 2012-13 | 6 | Dayton Demonz | Akwesasne Warriors; Brooklyn Aviators; Delaware Federals; Pennsylvania Blues* | New Jersey Outlaws → Williamsport Outlaws; Thousand Islands Privateers → Watertown, New York (continued to use 1000 Islands name for this season); Cape Cod Bluefins → New York Bluefins† | | Dayton Devils‡ → Dayton Demonz; Williamsport Outlaws → Pennsylvania Outlaws*; Pennsylvania Outlaws → Pennsylvania Blues† |
| 2013-14 | 4 | | New York Bluefins | | | Thousand Islands Privateers → Watertown Privateers |
| 2014-15 | 6 (Note: Due to mid-season folding, seven total teams played but only six teams played at any given time.) | Berkshire Battalion; SWPA Magic | Berlin River Drivers‡ | | | SWPA Magic → Steel City Warriors*; Watertown Privateers → Watertown Wolves |
| 2015-16 | 6 | Berlin River Drivers; Brewster Bulldogs; Danbury Titans; Port Huron Prowlers | Dayton Demonz; Stateline Whalers‡ Steel City Warriors; Watertown Wolves | Berkshire Battalion → Dayton Demolition; Danbury Whalers → Stateline Whalers (Brewster, NY) | | |
| 2016-17 | 7 | Cornwall Nationals; St. Clair Shores Fighting Saints | Brewster Bulldogs; Dayton Demolition | | Watertown Wolves | |
| 2017-18 | 6 | Carolina Thunderbirds; Northern Federals† | Berlin River Drivers; Cornwall Nationals*; Danbury Titans | St. Clair Shores Fighting Saints → North Shore Knights | | |
| 2018-19 | 6 | Elmira Enforcers; Mentor Ice Breakers | North Shore Knights; Northern Federals | | | |
| 2019-20 | 10 | Battle Creek Rumble Bees; Columbus River Dragons; Danbury Hat Tricks; Delaware Thunder | | | | |
| 2020-21 | 4 | Bloomington; Motor City Rockers | Battle Creek Rumble Bees; Bloomington‡ Danbury Hat Tricks# Danville Dashers# Delaware Thunder# Mentor Ice Breakers; Motor City Rockers#‡ Watertown Wolves# | | | |
| 2021-22 | 7 | Binghamton Black Bears | Danville Dashers; Elmira Enforcers; Motor City Rockers‡# | | Danbury Hat Tricks; Delaware Thunder; Watertown Wolves | |
| 2022-23 | 10 | Mississippi Sea Wolves; Elmira Mammoth | | | Motor City Rockers | |
| 2023-24 | 11 | Baton Rouge Zydeco; Blue Ridge Bobcats; Elmira River Sharks | Delaware Thunder; Elmira Mammoth | | | |
| 2024-25 | 14 | Athens Rock Lobsters; Monroe Moccasins | | Elmira River Sharks → Hudson Valley Venom | Danville Dashers | Hudson Valley Venom → HC Venom* |
| 2025-26 | 14 | Topeka Scarecrows; Indiana Sentinels | Danville Dashers; Motor City Rockers | HC Venom → Pee Dee IceCats | | Mississippi Sea Wolves → Biloxi Breakers; Carolina Thunderbirds → Twin City Thunderbirds |
| 2026-27 | 17 | Fresno Falcons; Mid-South Monarchs; Minnesota Northern Lights; Oceanside Shock; Stockton Thunder | Athens Rock Lobsters§ Pee Dee IceCats§ Biloxi Breakers | | Motor City Rockers | Baton Rouge Zydeco → Baton Rouge Kingfish |

* – Indicates event took place mid-season
‡ – Indicates event occurred prior to the team ever playing a game
† – Indicates mid-season road-only replacement team
# – Hiatus due to pandemic
§ – joined another league

== Championship ==
Typically at the end of each season, the league holds a playoff to award the Commissioner's Cup. The playoffs were not held in 2020 and the Commissioner's Cup was not awarded as the league championship in 2021 due to a limited season, instead they awarded the Ignite Cup.

| Year | Winner | Runner-up | Result |
|---|---|---|---|
| 2011 | Akwesasne Warriors | New York Aviators | 3-1 |
| 2012 | New Jersey Outlaws | Danbury Whalers | 3-0 |
| 2013 | Danbury Whalers | Dayton Demonz | 3-0 |
| 2014 | Dayton Demonz | Danbury Whalers | 3-2 |
| 2015 | Watertown Wolves | Danville Dashers | 3-2 |
| 2016 | Port Huron Prowlers | Danbury Titans | 3-0 |
| 2017 | Danville Dashers | Berlin River Drivers | 3-2 |
| 2018 | Watertown Wolves | Port Huron Prowlers | 3-1 |
| 2019 | Carolina Thunderbirds | Elmira Enforcers | 3-1 |
| 2020 | Not awarded due to COVID-19 pandemic | | |
| 2021 (Note: Called the Ignite Cup for this shortened season.) | Columbus River Dragons | Elmira Enforcers | 3-0 |
| 2022 | Watertown Wolves | Columbus River Dragons | 2-1 |
| 2023 | Danbury Hat Tricks | Carolina Thunderbirds | 3-2 |
| 2024 | Binghamton Black Bears | Carolina Thunderbirds | 3-0 |
| 2025 | Binghamton Black Bears | Carolina Thunderbirds | 3-0 |
| 2026 | Binghamton Black Bears | Pee Dee IceCats | 3-1 |

== See also ==
- List of ice hockey leagues
