= New York Bluefins =

- City: Travel team
- League: Federal Hockey League
- Founded: 2010
- Operated: 2010–2013
- Colors: Navy blue, sky blue, white

Franchise history
- 2010: Broome County Barons
- 2010–2011: Cape Cod Barons
- 2011–2012: Cape Cod Bluefins
- 2012–2013: New York Bluefins

The New York Bluefins were a professional hockey team in the Federal Hockey League (FHL) based in New York.

They started their inaugural 2010–11 season as the Broome County Barons with home games in the Chenango Ice Rink in Chenango, New York. The team was owned by the commissioner of the FHL, Don Kirnan. As a result of a market study conducted by the league during the 2010–11 regular season, the FHL moved the franchise to Cape Cod, Massachusetts, as the Cape Cod Barons at the end of December. On March 3, 2011, the league franchise rights for Cape Cod were transferred to the Cape Cod Hockey Development Foundation. The team was then renamed the Cape Cod Bluefins.

For the 2012–13 season, home games were scheduled to be played at a number of rinks throughout the Cape including ice arenas in Hyannis, Orleans, Falmouth, Bourne, and Martha's Vineyard. The team stopped playing home games in late November 2012. On December 15, 2012, it was announced that the control of the Bluefins was taken by the league with plans to move to the Syracuse, New York, area and took on the name New York Bluefins. However, they became a road-only team for the league to use to fill out the remaining home schedules of the other teams and were folded at the end of the season.

== Notable players ==
- Ryan Warsofsky
- Billy Tibbets
