= Williamsport Outlaws =

Professional ice hockey team

- City: Williamsport, Pennsylvania
- League: Federal Hockey League
- Founded: 2011
- Folded: 2013
- Home arena: Airmen Pond at Bowman Field
- Colors: Black, Red, Gray, White
- Owner(s): Kristin Ann Rooney, Esq.
- General manager: (United States) Chris Firriolo
- Head coach: (United States) Chris Firriolo
- Affiliate: Elmira Jackals (ECHL)

Franchise history
- 2011–2012: New Jersey Outlaws
- 2012–2013: Williamsport Outlaws
- 2013: Pennsylvania Outlaws
- 2013: Pennsylvania Blues

Championships
- Regular season titles: 1 (2012)
- Playoff championships: 1 (2012)

The Williamsport Outlaws were a professional ice hockey team in the Federal Hockey League. The team played the 2011-2012 season in Wayne, New Jersey as the New Jersey Outlaws. Following winning the FHL championship in 2012, the Outlaws announced they would move to Williamsport, Pennsylvania and play all of their games outdoors at Bowman Field while awaiting the completion of an arena in Williamsport.

The Outlaws were the FHL affiliate of the ECHL's Elmira Jackals.

The Outlaws ceased operations on January 21, 2013 after the team owner refused to play the remaining road games. The team was later rebranded as the Pennsylvania Blues on February 8, 2013 after the FHL took over control of the team and used the Blues as a traveling team to fill the schedule for the remainder of the season.

== Season-by-season record ==
| Season | GP | W | L | OTL | PTS | GF | GA | PIM | Finish |
|---|---|---|---|---|---|---|---|---|---|
| 2011–12 | 53 | 43 | 9 | 1 | 127 | 276 | 148 | 1116 | 1st |
| 2012–13 (Note: Combined record as Williamsport Outlaws and as the traveling team) | 45 | 23 | 19 | 3 | 69 | 203 | 195 | — | Disqualified |

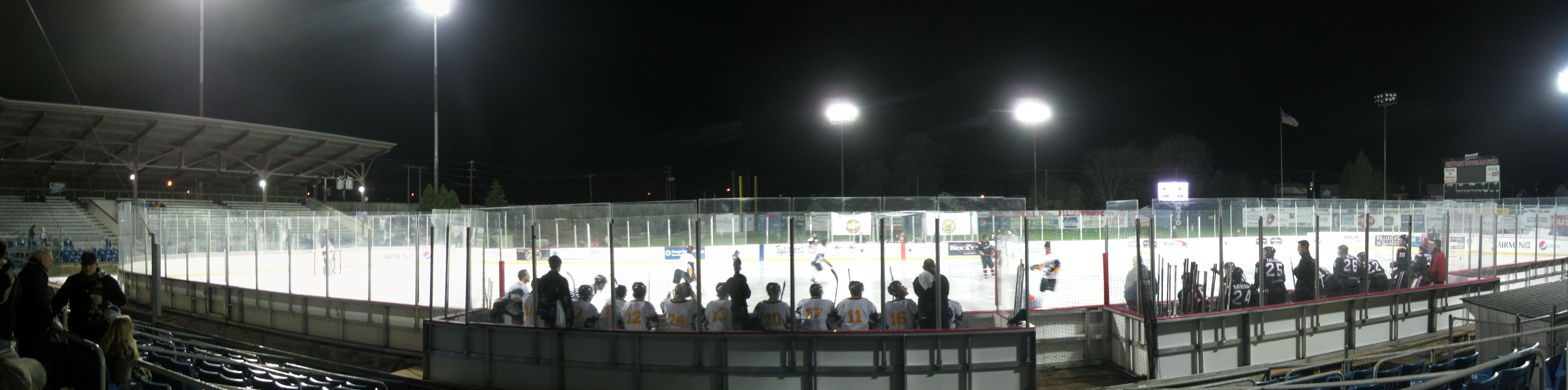
Panoramic view of Airmen Pond at Bowman Field from the first base side - the Dayton Demonz (left) are playing the Williamsport Outlaws (right) in a November 2012 game
