= 2018–19 FHL season =

- League: Federal Hockey League
- Sport: Ice hockey

Regular season
- Season champions: Carolina Thunderbirds
- Season MVP: Josh Pietrantonio (Carolina Thunderbirds)
- Top scorer: Tyler Gjurich (Watertown Wolves)

Playoffs
- Playoffs MVP: Michael Bunn (Thunderbirds)
- Finals champions: Carolina Thunderbirds (1st title)
- Runners-up: Elmira Enforcers

Seasons
- ← 2017–18 2019–20 →

The 2018–19 Federal Hockey League season was the ninth season of the Federal Hockey League. The regular season ran for 58 games for four of the six teams, with the Port Huron Prowlers and Danville Dashers each playing 59. The Carolina Thunderbirds won both the regular season and the playoff championships, the latter being their first league title.

== League changes ==
On July 17, 2018, Robbie Nichols announced he had acquired an expansion team in Elmira, New York, called the Elmira Enforcers, one year after the Elmira Jackals had ceased operations. In the same press conference, FHL commissioner Kirnan confirmed that the North Shore Knights—which had ceased to operate back in February and released all its players and staff in March—was formally folded.

The following week, the league announced another expansion team in Mentor, Ohio, called the Mentor Ice Breakers to bring the league back to six teams. The league also slightly altered its primary logo, changing the branding from Federal Professional Hockey League to Federal Prospects Hockey League, while still using the FHL abbreviation.

== Regular season ==
On March 10, 2019, Enforcers' owner Nichols assaulted a referee after the first period of a game against the Carolina Thunderbirds. The game was immediately cancelled by the officials, and subsequently led the FHL's officiating supervisor resigning from the league and pulling all the referees from the FHL citing the need to protect his personnel. Nichols was issued the league-maximum fine of $25,000. The league then recruited local officials for the remaining games.

The Thunderbirds went on to dominate the league standings, shattering single season records for wins and points, while leading the league in scoring despite not having a scorer in the top ten.

=== Standings ===
Final standings.

Team	GP	W	L	OTL	GF	GA	Pts	Att.
Carolina Thunderbirds	58	49	6	3	266	116	149	2714
Elmira Enforcers	58	33	20	5	224	173	99	3137
Watertown Wolves	58	31	26	1	236	256	87	964
Port Huron Prowlers	59	25	32	2	237	271	74	835
Danville Dashers	59	19	36	4	197	263	58	990
Mentor Ice Breakers	58	18	35	5	203	280	58	374

Advanced to playoffs

== Statistical leaders ==
=== Scoring leaders ===
The following players are sorted by points, then goals.

GP = Games played; G = Goals; A = Assists; Pts = Points; PIM = Penalty minutes

Player	Team	GP	G	A	Pts	PIM
Tyler Gjurich	Watertown Wolves	56	51	55	106	32
Dalton Jay	Port Huron Prowlers	57	43	62	105	20
Matt Robertson	Port Huron Prowlers	48	43	59	102	14
Josh Pietrantonio	Carolina Thunderbirds	54	27	56	83	93
Ahmed Mahfouz	Elmira Enforcers	37	29	53	82	104
Jan Salák	Carolina Thunderbirds	57	25	52	77	35
Matt Graham	Port Huron Prowlers	50	14	62	76	46
Zack Zulkanycz	Port Huron Prowlers	53	28	40	68	75
Yianni Liarakos	Watertown Wolves	43	30	37	67	53
Kyle Powell	Watertown Wolves	58	7	58	65	43

=== Leading goaltenders ===
GP = Games played; TOI = Time on ice (in minutes); SA = Shots against; GA = Goals against; SO = Shutouts; GAA = Goals against average; SV% = Save percentage; W = Wins; L = Losses; OTL = Overtime/shootout loss

Player	Team	GP	TOI	SA	GA	SO	GAA	SV%	W	L	OTL
Christián Pavlas	Carolina Thunderbirds	46	2101	906	62	5	1.77	.923	30	3	2
Troy Passingham	Elmira Enforcers	53	2459	1521	115	1	2.81	.925	21	16	6
Cory Simons	Port Huron Prowlers	40	1671	1145	88	1	3.16	.923	16	10	1
Matt Kaludis	Danville Dashers	54	2779	1944	146	0	4.12	.902	14	28	6
Derek Moser	Mentor Ice Breakers	54	1969	1172	146	4	4.45	.875	12	18	5

== Playoffs ==
The Thunderbirds and Enforcers met again in the league championships, with the Thunderbirds opening the series with winning the first two games. In the second game, the Thunderbirds won in overtime with a game-winning goal landing on the back of the Enforcers' goaltender and then fell across the goal line when he got up. The Enforcers heavily contested the call, with team-leading scorer Ahmed Mahfouz verbally confronting the officials and leading to a physical altercation between head coach Brent Clarke and a linesman. Mahfouz then broke his stick over the goalpost and tossed it over the glass into the stands before leaving the ice. Finally, Enforcers' goaltender Passingham was still disputing the goal with the official before leaving for the visitor's locker room, with the walkway passing directly next the fans, and a fan threw a filled cup at Passingham. Passingham then attacked the fan before they were eventually separated. Clarke, Mahfouz, and Passingham were all suspended by the league: Mahfouz for one game, Passingham for two, and Clarke for five games. The Enforcers then won the next game before the Thunderbirds won the championship in game four.

Semifinals (Best of 3)
1	Carolina Thunderbirds	2
4	Port Huron Prowlers	0
2	Elmira Enforcers	2
3	Watertown Wolves	0

Finals(Best of 5)
1	Carolina Thunderbirds	3
2	Elmira Enforcers	1

== Semifinals ==
=== (1) Carolina Thunderbirds vs. (4) Port Huron Prowlers ===
April 12	Carolina Thunderbirds	5–4	Port Huron Prowlers	McMorran Place
14:18 – Michael Bunn (1)		First period	No scoring
3:26 – Jiří Pargáč (1); 10:58 – pp – Petr Panáček (1); 13:48 – Jay Croop (1)		Second period	Alex Johnson (1) – pp – 6:23; Matt Robertson (1) – pp – 7:20; Dalton Jay (1) – sh – 10:29
6:32 – Josh Pietrantonio (1)		Third period	Matt Robertson (2) – 19:43
Christián Pavlas (23 saves / 27 shots)		Goalie stats	Chris Paulin (36 saves / 41 shots)

April 13	Port Huron Prowlers	2–3	Carolina Thunderbirds	Winston-Salem Fairgrounds Arena
No scoring		First period	15:11 – Jay Croop (2)
Alex Johnson (2) – 3:35		Second period	12:36 – Michael Bunn (2); 18:02 – pp – Michael Bunn (3)
Matt Graham (1) – 9:31		Third period	No scoring
Chris Paulin (26 saves / 29 shots)		Goalie stats	Christián Pavlas (29 saves / 31 shots)

Carolina won series 2–0

=== (2) Elmira Enforcers vs. (3) Watertown Wolves ===
April 12	Elmira Enforcers	5–4	Watertown Wolves	Watertown Municipal Arena
5:30 – pp – Sean Reynolds (1); 7:17 – Mitch Atkins (1)		First period	Tyler Prendergast (1) – 4:25; Tyler Prendergast (2) – 18:36
13:47 – Brandon Vuic (1)		Second period	Tyler Gjurich (1) – pp – 3:30; Tyler Gjurich (2) – 9:38
11:16 – Stepan Timofeyev (1); 19:16 – Sean Reynolds (2)		Third period	No scoring
Troy Passingham (28 saves / 32 shots)		Goalie stats	Jared Rutledge (33 saves / 38 shots)

April 13	Watertown Wolves	4–7	Elmira Enforcers	First Arena
Deric Boudreau (1) – 10:24		First period	6:23 – Brandon Vuic (2); 18:17 – Ahmed Mahfouz (1)
No scoring		Second period	2:53 – Mitch Atkins (2); 17:37 – Gavin Yates (1)
Tyler Gjurich (3) – pp – 3:39; Deric Boudreau (2) – 3:48; Tyler Gjurich (4) – pp – 11:27		Third period	1:43 – pp – Sean Reynolds (3); 19:16 – en – Stepan Timofeyev (2); 19:43 – en – Stepan Timofeyev (3)
Jared Rutledge (29 saves / 34 shots)		Goalie stats	Troy Passingham (36 saves / 40 shots)

Elmira won series 2–0

== FHL Finals ==
=== (1) Carolina Thunderbirds vs. (2) Elmira Enforcers ===
April 19	Elmira Enforcers	3–7	Carolina Thunderbirds	Winston-Salem Fairgrounds Arena
Kyle Stevens (1) – 18:52		First period	2:15 – Michael Bunn (4); 13:46 – Beau Walker (1); 15:51 – Karel Drahorad (1)
Sean Reynolds (4) – 15:38		Second period	2:25 – Beau Walker (2); 6:43 – Michael Bunn (5); 11:27 – Jiří Peštuka (1)
Jacob Walters (1) – 6:53		Third period	6:03 – Josh Pietrantonio (2)
Troy Passingham (34 saves / 41 shots); Nick Niedert (6 saves / 6 shots)		Goalie stats	Christián Pavlas (26 saves / 29 shots)

April 20	Elmira Enforcers	3–4	OT	Carolina Thunderbirds	Winston-Salem Fairgrounds Arena
Brandon Vuic (3) – 13:08		First period		No scoring
Gavin Yates (2) – 4:11; Brandon Vuic (4) – 4:55		Second period		18:28 – Karel Drahorad (2); 18:50 – Petr Panáček (2)
No scoring		Third period		19:38 – pp – Josh Pietrantonio (3)
No scoring		First overtime period		17:20 – Michael Bunn (6)
Troy Passingham (73 saves / 77 shots)		Goalie stats		Christián Pavlas (22 saves / 25 shots)

April 26	Carolina Thunderbirds	2–7	Elmira Enforcers	First Arena
Beau Walker (3) – 3:14		First period	0:58 – Sean Reynolds (5); 4:49 – Kyle Stevens (2); 9:31 – pp – Stepan Timofeyev (4); 10:53 – pp – Brandon Vuic (5); 17:27 – Tom Tracy (1)
No scoring		Second period	No scoring
Jan Salák (1) – 4:31		Third period	1:23 – Brendan Hussey (1); 4:37 – ps – Brandon Vuic (6)
Christián Pavlas (23 saves / 30 shots)		Goalie stats	Nick Niedert (42 saves / 44 shots)

April 27	Carolina Thunderbirds	4–3	OT	Elmira Enforcers	First Arena
Beau Walker (4) – 5:46		First period		No scoring
No scoring		Second period		2:22 – pp – Kyle Stevens (3); 5:45 – Mitch Atkins (3)
Jan Salák (2) – 0:14; Petr Panáček (3) – pp – 10:18		Third period		15:21 – Nathan Pelligra (1)
Jan Salák (3) – pp – 0:35		First overtime period		No scoring
Christián Pavlas (17 saves / 20 shots)		Goalie stats		Nick Niedert (43 saves / 47 shots)

Carolina won series 3–1
