= 2019–20 FPHL season =

- League: Federal Prospects Hockey League
- Sport: Ice hockey
- Teams: 10
- Season champions: Carolina Thunderbirds

Commissioner Cup playoffs
- Champions: None
- Runners-up: None

Seasons
- 2018–19 2020–21

The 2019–20 Federal Prospects Hockey League season was the tenth season of the Federal Prospects Hockey League (FPHL) and the first with "Prospects" in the league's name. The regular season was an unbalanced schedule with the ten teams in the league playing somewhere from 56 to 60 games per team. On March 16, 2020, the league canceled the remainder of the 2019–20 season schedule due to the COVID-19 pandemic.

== League changes ==
Following the 2018–19 season, the league fully branded itself as the Federal Prospects Hockey League with a new FPHL logo.

The Danbury Hat Tricks were announced as an expansion team on May 7, 2019, with Formee FHL player Billy McCreary was announced a general manager and head coach. The team is owned by DP 110 LLC, the same group that had recently purchased the Danbury Ice Arena. In April 2019, the Columbus, Georgia, city council voted to award a five-year lease to Ignite Pro Hockey, LLC at the Civic Center. On May 21, 2019, the league awarded an expansion team to Columbus and was named the Columbus River Dragons. The Delaware Thunder were announced as a member on May 29, 2019, owned by Delaware Pro Hockey LLC, an investment group led by Charlie Pens, who also served as the president and general manager of the team. In June 2019, the league's schedule revealed a tenth team for the 2019–20 season based in Michigan. On July 23, the Battle Creek Rumble Bees were announced.

The league split the ten teams into two divisions of five with the Elmira Enforcers, Watertown Wolves, Mentor Ice Breakers, Danbury Hat Tricks and Delaware Thunder in the Eastern Division and the Columbus River Dragons, Battle Creek Rumble Bees, Port Huron Prowlers, Danville Dashers, Carolina Thunderbirds in the Western Division. The top four teams in each division would qualify to make the playoffs

== Regular season ==
The Battle Creek Rumble Bees' 0–23–1 start to the season gave them the longest losing streak in professional hockey history that would hold up until the Delaware Thunder lost 26 straight in the 2022–23 season. On March 16, 2020, the league canceled the remainder of the 2019–20 season due to the COVID-19 pandemic.

Final standings:

Eastern Division
Team	GP	W	L	OTL	GF	GA	Pts	Pts%	Att.
Danbury Hat Tricks	46	31	12	3	212	158	94	.681	1,169
Elmira Enforcers	48	32	13	3	200	149	96	.667	3,077
Watertown Wolves	48	25	21	2	191	182	74	.514	847
Mentor Ice Breakers	48	15	30	3	147	196	48	.333	652
Delaware Thunder	45	13	31	1	165	206	39	.289	499
Western Division
Team	GP	W	L	OTL	GF	GA	Pts	Pts%	Att.
Carolina Thunderbirds	46	35	6	5	217	106	108	.783	2,831
Port Huron Prowlers	46	32	14	0	211	166	92	.667	1,036
Danville Dashers	47	26	18	3	172	150	79	.560	1,034
Columbus River Dragons	46	24	21	1	191	183	67	.486	3,046
Battle Creek Rumble Bees	48	1	45	2	94	304	5	.035	353

Qualified for playoffs

== Playoffs ==
Due to the COVID-19 pandemic, the playoffs were canceled as well.
