= Steve MacIntyre =

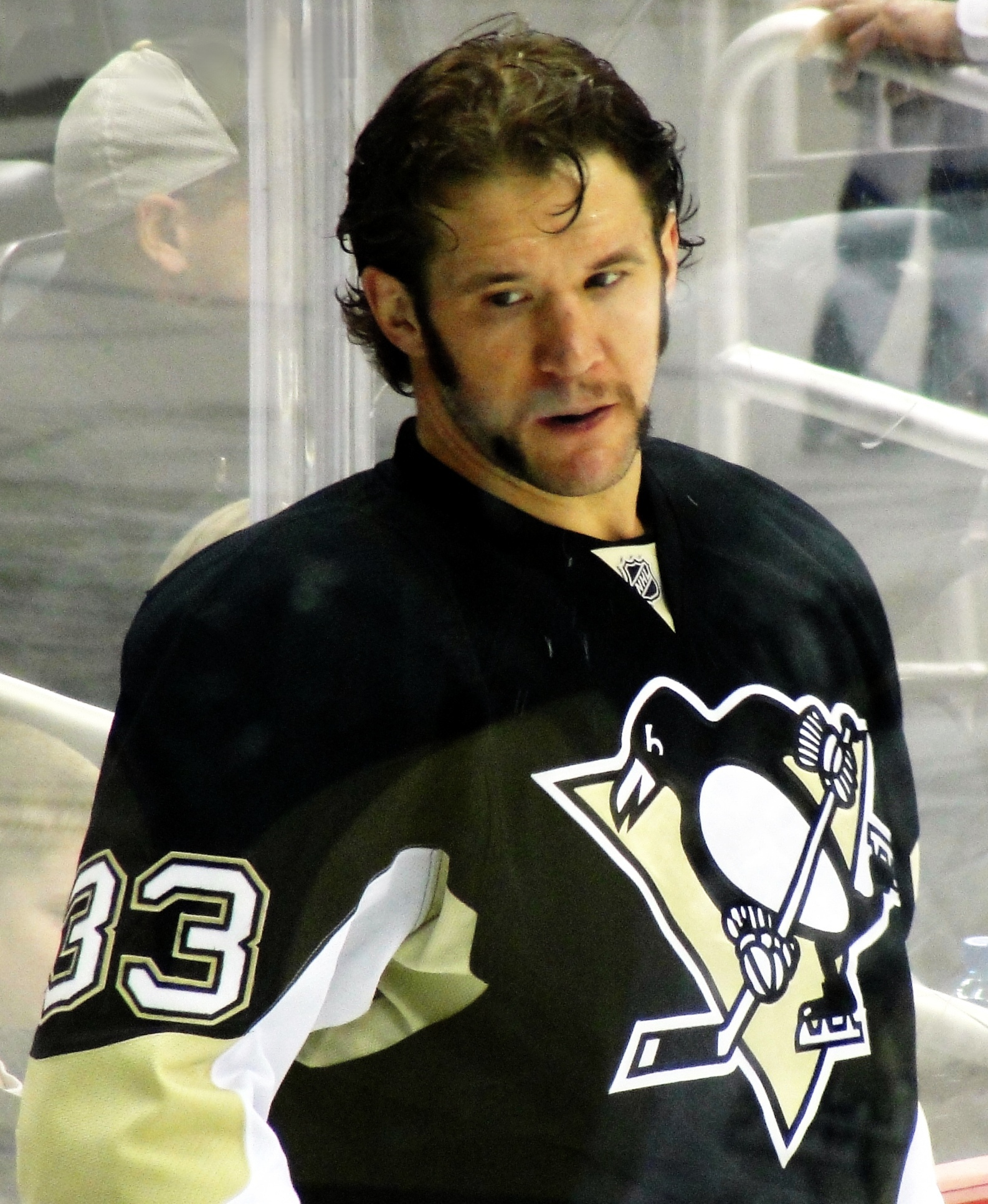
- MacIntyre with the Penguins in 2011.
- Born: August 8, 1980 (age 45) Brock, Saskatchewan, Canada
- Height: 6 ft 5 in (196 cm)
- Weight: 255 lb (116 kg; 18 st 3 lb)
- Position: Left wing
- Shot: Left
- Played for: Edmonton Oilers; Florida Panthers; Pittsburgh Penguins
- NHL draft: Undrafted
- Playing career: 2002–2020

Steven "Big Mac" MacIntyre (born August 8, 1980) is a Canadian former professional ice hockey left winger, who last played for the Carolina Thunderbirds in the FPHL, and is known as an enforcer.

== Playing career ==
=== Amateur ===
MacIntyre came to the Continental Elite Hockey League (CEHL) in 2001, after earning the reputation as one of Canada's best fighters in Major Junior circles. He was recruited to play for the Tri-City Hurricanes in Bay City, Michigan, who later became the Bay County Blizzard after a mid-season sale of the team by original owner Mike Killbreath. MacIntyre led the CEHL in penalty minutes and received a lifetime ban late in the season for his part in a nasty brawl with the Detroit Lightning. Banned by the CEHL, MacIntyre signed with the Muskegon Fury of the United Hockey League (UHL) and he helped them win the UHL's Colonial Cup, as playoff champions.

=== Professional ===
On May 22, 2003, he was signed by the New York Rangers, after playing two seasons as the most feared fighter in the UHL. He would spend the next two years within the Rangers' minor league affiliates, the Hartford Wolf Pack and the Charlotte Checkers, before having brief stints playing for the Quad City Mallards and the Providence Bruins, in 2006–07 and 2007–08, respectively.

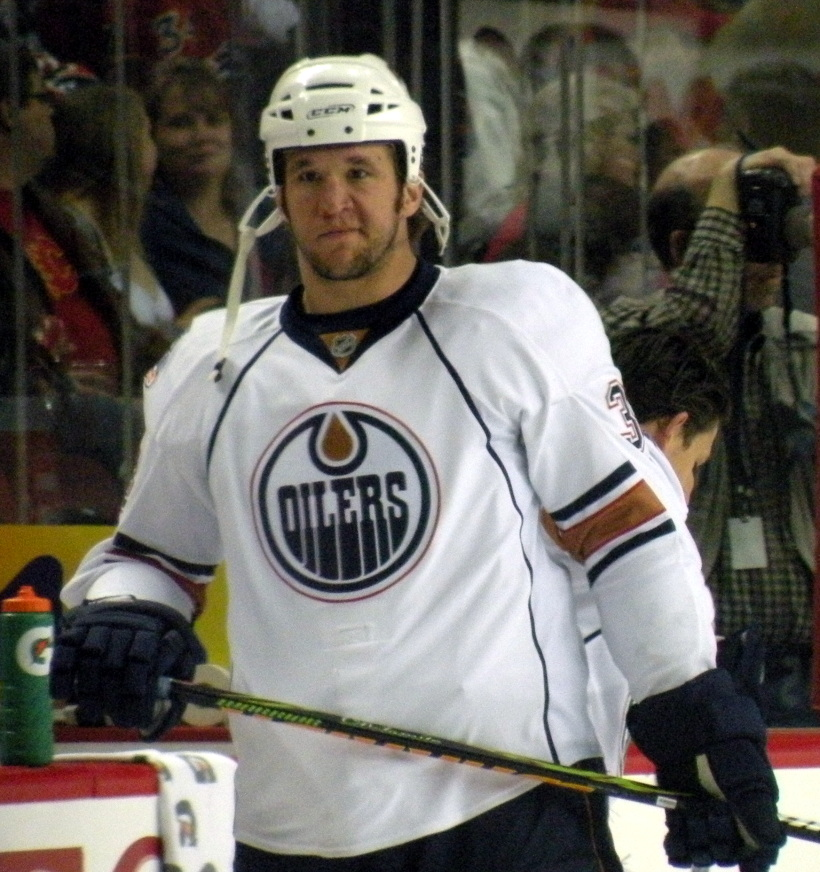
MacIntyre with the Oilers, April 2009.

On July 3, 2008, he signed as a free agent with the Florida Panthers, having never played an NHL game in a Rangers uniform. This would turn out to be MacIntyre's first stint in Florida (before returning in 2009). He was assigned to their minor league affiliates, the Rochester Americans on waivers, on September 28, 2008. He was picked up on waivers by the Edmonton Oilers two days later, on September 30. MacIntyre had an immediate impact in Edmonton, playing his first NHL game on October 3, against the Oilers' arch-rivals, the Calgary Flames - earning himself 7 minutes in the penalty box; 2 minutes for roughing and a further 5 minutes for a fight with Jim Vandermeer.

On November 11, 2008, the Oilers placed MacIntyre on their Injured Reserve (IR) list, with a fractured orbital bone, an injury he sustained from a fight five nights earlier, against the Pittsburgh Penguins with fellow NHL "heavyweight" Eric Godard. He subsequently would miss the next 26 games. He would make his return on January 11, 2009, in a 2–1 win over the St. Louis Blues. Two nights later, January 13, MacIntyre would score his first NHL goal, in a 5–2 victory over the Washington Capitals. MacIntyre would add another goal later in the 2008–09 season and would finish with a total of 2 points from 22 games, collecting 40 penalty minutes.

On November 9, 2009, he was assigned to the Oilers' minor league affiliate, the Springfield Falcons on waivers, after playing bit parts in 4 games. However, he would be picked up a day later, on November 10, by his former team, the Florida Panthers. He would spend the rest of the 2009–10 season between the Panthers and their AHL affiliates, the Rochester Americans, helping the Americans reach the 2010 Calder Cup Playoffs.

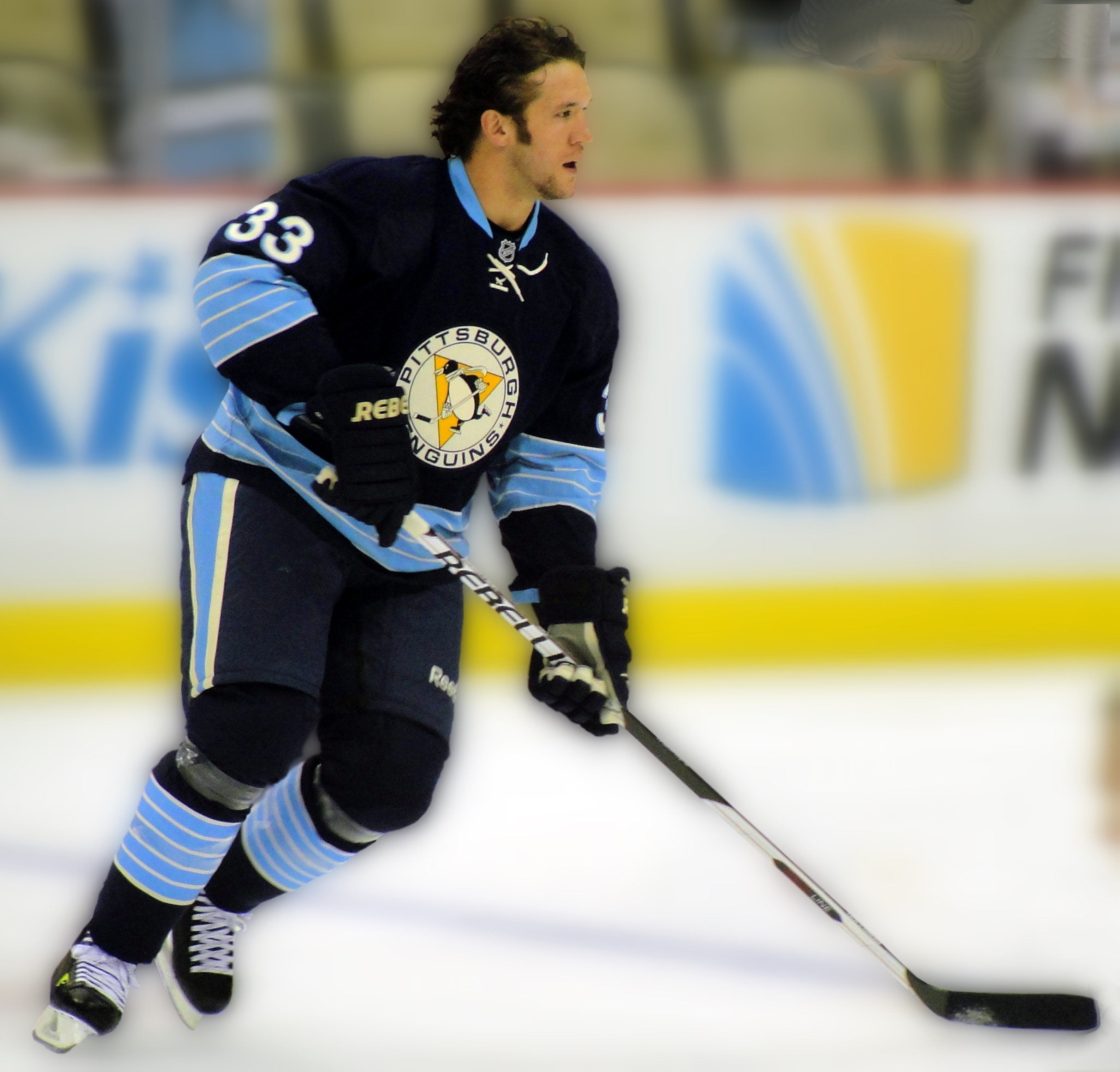
Steve MacIntyre, October 2011.

On July 2, 2010, Steve MacIntyre signed a 1-year contract with the Edmonton Oilers, returning to the team he started his NHL career with. In an interview on The Team 1260 MacIntyre said "he was excited to be back" and was "very thankful" at the chance for another opportunity to play for the Oilers.

On July 1, 2011, MacIntyre became a free agent. He later signed a one-year, two-way contract with the Pittsburgh Penguins on July 12.

On January 11, 2012, the Pittsburgh Penguins placed Steve MacIntyre on waivers, and he was sent down to the Wilkes-Barre/Scranton Penguins after he cleared waivers the following day.

On September 23, 2013, prior to the 2013–14 season, the Edmonton Oilers claimed MacIntyre off waivers, marking it the third tenure within the organization. He was assigned to their AHL affiliate, the Oklahoma City Barons. He did not re-sign with the Barons at the end of the season and on September 11, 2014, the Norfolk Admirals announced they had signed MacIntyre.

On January 19, 2018, the Carolina Thunderbirds of the Federal Hockey League announced they had signed MacIntyre.

== Career statistics ==
			Regular season					Playoffs
Season	Team	League	GP	G	A	Pts	PIM	GP	G	A	Pts	PIM
1997–98	Saskatoon Blades	WHL	1	0	0	0	0	—	—	—	—	—
1998–99	Saskatoon Blades	WHL	55	2	0	2	190	—	—	—	—	—
1999–2000	Red Deer Rebels	WHL	20	0	0	0	65	—	—	—	—	—
1999–2000	Prince Albert Raiders	WHL	47	1	1	2	100	4	0	0	0	22
2000–01	Medicine Hat Tigers	WHL	4	1	0	1	7	—	—	—	—	—
2001–02	Bay County Blizzard	CEHL	31	14	16	30	260	—	—	—	—	—
2001–02	Muskegon Fury	UHL	11	1	1	2	58	12	0	2	2	23
2002–03	St. Jean Mission	QSPHL	10	1	1	2	68	—	—	—	—	—
2002–03	Muskegon Fury	UHL	54	2	1	3	279	5	0	0	0	24
2003–04	Charlotte Checkers	ECHL	61	1	4	5	217	—	—	—	—	—
2003–04	Hartford Wolf Pack	AHL	3	0	0	0	0	—	—	—	—	—
2003–04	Jacksonville Barracudas	WHA2	6	0	2	2	18	5	0	1	1	17
2004–05	Charlotte Checkers	ECHL	46	1	4	5	214	11	0	4	4	17
2004–05	Hartford Wolf Pack	AHL	27	1	1	2	207	—	—	—	—	—
2005–06	Charlotte Checkers	ECHL	61	3	2	5	238	1	0	0	0	4
2006–07	Quad City Mallards	UHL	46	2	1	3	168	5	0	0	0	6
2007–08	Providence Bruins	AHL	62	2	3	5	213	5	0	0	0	9
2008–09	Edmonton Oilers	NHL	22	2	0	2	40	—	—	—	—	—
2009–10	Edmonton Oilers	NHL	4	0	0	0	7	—	—	—	—	—
2009–10	Florida Panthers	NHL	18	0	1	1	17	—	—	—	—	—
2009–10	Rochester Americans	AHL	34	0	2	2	86	6	0	0	0	23
2010–11	Edmonton Oilers	NHL	34	0	1	1	93	—	—	—	—	—
2011–12	Wilkes-Barre/Scranton Penguins	AHL	24	1	0	1	59	—	—	—	—	—
2011–12	Pittsburgh Penguins	NHL	12	0	0	0	6	—	—	—	—	—
2012–13	Wilkes-Barre/Scranton Penguins	AHL	29	0	0	0	70	—	—	—	—	—
2012–13	Pittsburgh Penguins	NHL	1	0	0	0	12	—	—	—	—	—
2013–14	Oklahoma City Barons	AHL	11	0	0	0	34	—	—	—	—	—
2014–15	Norfolk Admirals	AHL	18	0	0	0	28	—	—	—	—	—
2014–15	Utah Grizzlies	ECHL	21	0	3	3	16	—	—	—	—	—
2017–18	Carolina Thunderbirds	FHL	12	2	5	7	88	—	—	—	—	—
2018–19	Carolina Thunderbirds	FPHL	1	0	0	0	17	—	—	—	—	—
2019–20	Carolina Thunderbirds	FPHL	11	1	5	6	15	—	—	—	—	—
ECHL totals			189	5	13	18	685	12	0	4	4	21
AHL totals			208	4	6	10	697	11	0	0	0	32
NHL totals			91	2	2	4	175	—	—	—	—	—
