= CEHL =

CEHL could refer to one of three ice hockey leagues:

- Central European Hockey League, the highest league of Belgium and the Netherlands, established in 2015 and known as BeNe League until 2024
- Canadian Elite Hockey League, semi-pro league the operated for the 2005–06 season
- Continental Elite Hockey League, junior league that operated from 2001 to 2004
