= PBLA =

PBLA may be an initialism for:

- Professional Basketball League of America (1947–1948)
- Professional Box Lacrosse Association (2022–present)
