= Mike McEwen (ice hockey) =

Canadian ice hockey player

- Born: August 10, 1956 (age 69) Hornepayne, Ontario, Canada
- Height: 6 ft 1 in (185 cm)
- Weight: 195 lb (88 kg; 13 st 13 lb)
- Position: Defence
- Shot: Left
- Played for: New York Rangers; Colorado Rockies; New York Islanders; Los Angeles Kings; Washington Capitals; Detroit Red Wings; Hartford Whalers
- NHL draft: 42nd overall, 1976; New York Rangers
- WHA draft: 71st overall, 1976; Toronto Toros
- Playing career: 1976–1992

Michael Todd McEwen (born August 10, 1956) is a Canadian former professional ice hockey player. He was a three-time Stanley Cup winner who played with seven different NHL teams. He also played in the 1980 NHL All-Star Game.

== Biography ==
McEwen was born in Hornepayne, Ontario. As a youth, he played in the 1968 and 1969 Quebec International Pee-Wee Hockey Tournament with minor ice hockey teams from Toronto.

McEwen was selected by the New York Rangers as an offensive-minded defenceman in the 1976 NHL Draft. His talents immediately paid dividends as he helped guide the Rangers to the finals in 1979. His tenure with the Rangers would not last long as he was traded to the Colorado Rockies in the giant trade that sent Barry Beck to New York.

His stay with the Rockies was short-lived as he would frequently clash with head coach Don Cherry, and he was eventually traded to the New York Islanders in the deal that sent Steve Tambellini and Chico Resch to the Rockies. The trade would soon pay off for the Islanders as his offensive talents helped them in three of their Stanley Cup championships, in 1981, 1982, and 1983.

McEwen would also play for the Los Angeles Kings, Washington Capitals, Detroit Red Wings, and Hartford Whalers before his NHL career ended following the 1987–88 season.

McEwen was the first coach of the Oklahoma City Blazers, whom he coached to three consecutive playoff appearances in 1992-93, 1993–94, and 1994–95.

McEwen currently resides in Oklahoma City, Oklahoma. He was heavily involved in the daily operations of Kids First, a program designed to open hockey up to youth of all ages. Additionally, McEwen held various positions within the Oklahoma Youth Hockey Association, including House program director and Youth Travel Team Coach. After a disagreement with the Association, McEwen is no longer involved in Oklahoma City Youth Hockey.

McEwen most recently held the position as the Parks and Recreation Director for the City of Del City.

== Legacy ==
In the 2009 book 100 Ranger Greats, the authors ranked McEwen at No. 98 all-time of the 901 New York Rangers who had played during the team's first 82 seasons.

== Career statistics ==
			Regular season					Playoffs
Season	Team	League	GP	G	A	Pts	PIM	GP	G	A	Pts	PIM
1973–74	Toronto Marlboros	OHA-Jr.	68	5	32	37	81	—	—	—	—	—
1974–75	Toronto Marlboros	OMJHL	68	18	63	81	52	23	5	14	19	33
1974–75	Toronto Marlboros	MC	—	—	—	—	—	4	1	3	4	4
1975–76	Toronto Marlboros	OMJHL	65	23	40	63	63	10	3	9	12	20
1976–77	New York Rangers	NHL	80	14	29	43	38	—	—	—	—	—
1977–78	New York Rangers	NHL	57	5	13	18	52	—	—	—	—	—
1978–79	New York Rangers	NHL	80	20	38	58	35	18	2	11	13	8
1979–80	New York Rangers	NHL	9	1	7	8	8	—	—	—	—	—
1979–80	Colorado Rockies	NHL	67	11	40	51	33	—	—	—	—	—
1980–81	Colorado Rockies	NHL	65	11	35	46	84	—	—	—	—	—
1980–81	New York Islanders	NHL	13	0	3	3	10	17	6	8	14	6
1981–82	New York Islanders	NHL	73	10	39	49	50	15	3	7	10	18
1982–83	New York Islanders	NHL	42	2	11	13	16	12	0	2	2	4
1983–84	New York Islanders	NHL	15	0	2	2	6	—	—	—	—	—
1983–84	Los Angeles Kings	NHL	47	10	24	34	14	—	—	—	—	—
1983–84	New Haven Nighthawks	AHL	9	3	7	10	26	—	—	—	—	—
1984–85	Washington Capitals	NHL	56	11	27	38	42	5	0	1	1	4
1984–85	Binghamton Whalers	AHL	14	2	10	12	14	—	—	—	—	—
1985–86	Detroit Red Wings	NHL	29	0	10	10	16	—	—	—	—	—
1985–86	New York Rangers	NHL	16	2	5	7	8	—	—	—	—	—
1985–86	New Haven Nighthawks	AHL	2	0	3	3	2	—	—	—	—	—
1985–86	Hartford Whalers	NHL	10	3	2	5	6	8	0	4	4	6
1986–87	Hartford Whalers	NHL	48	8	8	16	32	1	1	1	2	0
1987–88	HC Sierre	NDA	32	18	20	38	38	—	—	—	—	—
1987–88	Hartford Whalers	NHL	9	0	3	3	10	2	0	2	2	2
1988–89	EHC Olten	NDA	35	19	15	34	116	2	2	0	2	18
1989–90	EHC Olten	NDA	28	8	15	23	34	—	—	—	—	—
1990–91	EHC Olten	NDA	26	4	18	22	90	—	—	—	—	—
1991–92	New Haven Nighthawks	AHL	51	4	19	23	32	—	—	—	—	—
NHL totals			716	108	296	404	460	78	12	36	48	48
NDA totals			121	49	68	117	298	2	2	0	2	18

== Coaching statistics ==
Team	Year	Regular season							Postseason
Team	Year	G	W	L	T	OTL	Pts	Division rank	Result
OKC	1992–93	60	39	18	–	3	81	1st in CHL	Won in semifinals (4–2 vs. MEM); Lost in Levins Cup Finals (1–4 vs. TUL)
OKC	1993–94	64	35	23	6	–	76	3rd in CHL	Lost in semifinals (3–4 vs. TUL)
OKC	1994–95	66	34	23	9	–	77	4th in CHL	Lost in semifinal (1–4 vs. WIC)
Total		190	108	64	15	3			
