= 1975 Memorial Cup =

Canadian junior men's ice hockey championship

Tournament details
- Venue(s): Kitchener Memorial Auditorium Complex (Kitchener, Ontario)
- Dates: May 3–11, 1975
- Teams: 3

Final positions
- Champions: Toronto Marlboros (OMJHL) (7th title)

The Memorial Cup trophy

The 1975 Memorial Cup took place May 3–11 at the Kitchener Memorial Auditorium Complex in Kitchener, Ontario. It was the 57th annual Memorial Cup competition, organized by the Canadian Amateur Hockey Association (CAHA) to determine the champion of major junior A ice hockey. Participating teams were the winners of the Ontario Major Junior Hockey League, Quebec Major Junior Hockey League and Western Hockey League which were the Toronto Marlboros, Sherbrooke Castors and New Westminster Bruins. Toronto won their 7th Memorial Cup, defeating New Westminster in the final game.

== Teams ==
QMJHL Team OHA Team WCHL Team Host City

=== New Westminster Bruins ===
The New Westminster Bruins coached by Punch McLean, represented the Western Canada Hockey League at the 1975 Memorial Cup. The Bruins finished the 1974-75 season in third place in the West Division with a 37-22-11 record, earning 85 points. New Westminster scored 319 goals during the season, which ranked them sixth in the twelve team league. The Bruins were a strong defensive club, allowing 260 goals, which was the third fewest in the WCHL. In the West Division semi-finals, the Bruins defeated the second place Medicine Hat Tigers four games to one. In the West Division finals, New Westminster upset the Victoria Cougars, the top team in the WCHL, four games to two to advance to the WCHL finals. In the final round, the Bruins defeated the first place team from the East Division, the Saskatoon Blades, to win the President's Cup and earn a berth into the 1975 Memorial Cup.

Fred Berry led the Bruins in scoring, as he had 32 goals and 75 points in 69 games. Berry led New Westminster in post-season scoring as he scored 12 goals and 24 points in 18 games. Brian Shmyr scored 21 goals and 68 points in 68 games to rank second in team scoring. Seventeen year old rookie Mark Lofthouse scored a team high 36 goals, and added 28 assists for 64 points in 61 games. Rick Shinske was acquired by the Bruins during the season in a trade with the Calgary Centennials, as in 48 games with New Westminster, Shinske scored 20 goals and 64 points. Seventeen year old rookie Brad Maxwell emerged as the highest scoring defenseman on the team, scoring 13 goals and 60 points in 69 games. In 18 post-season games, Maxwell scored seven goals and 20 points, and became a top prospect for the 1976 NHL entry draft, which was still more than a year away. Gordie Laxton, a top prospect for the 1975 NHL entry draft, was the Bruins goaltender. In 70 games, Laxton earned a record of 35-21-11 with a 3.58 GAA and a .887 save percentage. Laxton would eventually be selected with the thirteenth overall selection by the Pittsburgh Penguins.

The 1975 Memorial Cup was the first appearance by the Bruins in team history.

=== Sherbrooke Castors ===
The Sherbrooke Castors represented the Quebec Major Junior Hockey League at the 1975 Memorial Cup. The Castors had a very strong season in 1974-75, as the club finished the year with a record of 51-14-7, earning 109 points and winning the Jean Rougeau Trophy, awarded to the club with the best regular season record. The Castors were a high scoring team, as they were second in the QMJHl with 443 goals. Sherbrooke allowed the fewest goals in the league at 269. In the QMJHL quarter-finals, the Castors swept the Hull Festivals in four games. In the QMJHL semi-finals, Sherbrooke pulled off their second consecutive sweep, as they defeated the Chicoutimi Saguenéens in four games. In the President's Cup finals, the Castors faced the Laval National and defeated the club with relative ease in five games to win the championship and earn a berth at the 1975 Memorial Cup.

The high-powered offense of the Castors was led by Michel Brisebois, who led the club with 51 goals and 126 points in 71 games, finishing in ninth in league scoring. Jere Gillis scored 34 goals and 95 points in 54 games and became a top prospect for the 1977 NHL entry draft. Sid Veysey appeared in only 48 games during the season, however, he scored 37 goals and 90 points to finish third in team scoring. Claude Larose was acquired by the Castors from the Shawinigan Dynamos in a mid-season trade, scored 40 goals and 84 points in 39 games. Larose led the team in post-season scoring, scoring 12 goals and 28 points in 13 games. At the 1975 WHA Amateur Draft, Larose was selected first overall by the Cincinnati Stingers. Richard Mulhern anchored the Castors defense, as he scored 26 goals and 90 points in 70 games. Mulhern was a top ranked prospect and was selected eighth overall by the Atlanta Flames in the 1975 NHL entry draft. Goaltender Nick Sanza won the Jacques Plante Memorial Trophy, awarded to the Goaltender with the Lowest GAA in the league. Sanza appeared in 66 games, posting a record of 45-13-7 with a 3.51 GAA and a .883 save percentage. In the post-season, he had a perfect 12-0 record with a 3.04 GAA and a .887 save percentage in 13 games.

The 1975 Memorial Cup was the first appearance by the Castors at the tournament in franchise history.

=== Toronto Marlboros ===
The Toronto Marlboros represented the Ontario Major Junior Hockey League at the 1975 Memorial Cup. The Marlboros were the best regular season team in the OMJHL during the 1974-75 season, as they had a record of 48-13-9, earning 105 points, and winning the Hamilton Spectator Trophy as the top regular season in the league. The Marlboros were a very high-scoring team, scoring a league high 469 goals. Defensively, Toronto ranked fifth in the league as they allowed 303 goals. In the OMJHL quarter-finals, the Marlboros narrowly defeated the Kingston Canadians, winning the series four games to three with one tie. The Marlboros were pushed to the limit once again in the OMJHL semi-finals, as they defeated the Sudbury Wolves four games to three with one tie to advance to the finals. In the final round, Toronto was forced to the brink, narrowly defeating the Hamilton Fincups four games to three to capture the J. Ross Robertson Cup, and a berth in the 1975 Memorial Cup.

The Marlboros offense was led by Bruce Boudreau, who won the Eddie Powers Memorial Trophy as the highest scoring player in the league. Boudreau scored 68 goals and 165 points in 69 games to pace the Toronto offense. John Tonelli scored 49 goals and 135 points, which ranked him fourth in league scoring, in 70 games. Mark Napier emerged as a top prospect for the 1977 NHL entry draft as he scored 66 goals and 130 points in 61 games. Napier won the Jim Mahon Memorial Trophy as the highest scoring right winger in the OMJHL.John Anderson was another top prospect for the 1977 draft, as he scored 57 goals and 119 points in 64 games, giving Toronto four 100+ point players. John Smrke narrowly missed the 100 point plateau, as he scored 43 goals and 97 points in 61 games. Defenseman Mike McEwen led the Marlboros blue line, as he scored 18 goals and 81 points in 68 games. The Marlboros goaltending duties were split between Gary Carr and Steve Bosco.

The 1975 Memorial Cup was the Marlboros seventh time the club played for the trophy. In their previous six attempts, Toronto won the championship. Their most recent berth was at the 1973 Memorial Cup, when the Marlboros defeated the Quebec Remparts 9-1 in the final game to capture the championship. Other years that Toronto won the Memorial Cup was in 1929, 1955, 1956, 1964 and 1967.

== Round-robin standings ==
Pos	Team	Pld	W	L	GF	GA	
1	New Westminster Bruins (WHL)	2	2	0	13	7	Advanced to final
2	Toronto Marlboros (OMJHL)	2	1	1	9	10	Advanced to final
3	Sherbrooke Castors (QMJHL)	2	0	2	9	14	

== Scores ==
Round-robin

- May 3 Toronto 7-4 Sherbrooke
- May 5 New Westminster 7-5 Sherbrooke
- May 7 New Westminster 6-2 Toronto

Semi-Final

- May 9 Toronto 10-4 Sherbrooke

Final

- May 11 Toronto 7-3 New Westminster

== Winning roster ==
John Anderson, Steve Bosco, Bruce Boudreau, Al Cameron, Gary Carr, Craig Crawford, Brian Crichton, Steve Harrison, Trevor Johansen, Bernie Johnston, Lynn Jorgenson, Mike Kaszycki, Jim Kirkpatrick, Mike Kitchen, Mike McEwen, Mark Murphy, Mark Napier, Ed Saffrey, John Smrke, Bill Wells, Ron Wilson. Coach: George Armstrong

== Award winners ==
- Stafford Smythe Memorial Trophy (MVP): Barry Smith, New Westminster
- George Parsons Trophy (Sportsmanship): John Smrke, Toronto
- Hap Emms Memorial Trophy (Goaltender): Gary Carr, Toronto

All-star team

- Goal: Gary Carr, Toronto
- Defence: Mike Kitchen, Toronto; Brad Maxwell, New Westminster
- Centre: Barry Smith, New Westminster
- Left wing: Claude Larose, Sherbrooke
- Right wing: John Anderson, Toronto
