= John Smrke =

Canadian-born American ice hockey player

- Born: February 25, 1956 (age 69); Chicoutimi, Quebec, Canada
- Height: 5 ft 10 in (178 cm)
- Weight: 190 lb (86 kg; 13 st 8 lb)
- Position: Centre
- Played for: St. Louis Blues; Quebec Nordiques; HC Auronzo
- NHL draft: 25th overall, 1976; St. Louis Blues
- WHA draft: 41st overall, 1976; San Diego Mariners
- Playing career: 1976–1985

John Smrke (born February 25, 1956) is a Canadian-born American former professional ice hockey player who played 103 games in the National Hockey League with the St. Louis Blues and Quebec Nordiques between 1977 and 1980.

Smrke was born in Chicoutimi, Quebec and raised in Rochester, New York. His father was former NHLer Stan Smrke. He lived in Toronto while his father played in Rochester, and would occasionally visit during the season. As a youth, Smrke played in the 1969 Quebec International Pee-Wee Hockey Tournament with the Scarboro Lions minor ice hockey team.

== Career statistics ==
=== Regular season and playoffs ===
			Regular season					Playoffs
Season	Team	League	GP	G	A	Pts	PIM	GP	G	A	Pts	PIM
1973–74	Toronto Marlboros	OHA	70	23	28	51	18	—	—	—	—	—
1974–75	Toronto Marlboros	OMJHL	61	43	54	97	39	23	13	9	22	16
1974–75	Toronto Marlboros	M-Cup	—	—	—	—	—	4	3	3	6	0
1975–76	Toronto Marlboros	OMJHL	64	39	46	85	32	10	7	6	13	9
1976–77	Kansas City Blades	CHL	70	25	26	51	8	5	2	0	2	2
1977–78	St. Louis Blues	NHL	18	2	4	6	11	—	—	—	—	—
1977–78	Salt Lake Golden Eagles	CHL	60	25	45	70	21	6	4	2	6	2
1978–79	St. Louis Blues	NHL	55	6	8	14	20	—	—	—	—	—
1978–79	Salt Lake Golden Eagles	CHL	11	5	7	12	0	—	—	—	—	—
1979–80	Quebec Nordiques	NHL	30	3	5	8	2	—	—	—	—	—
1979–80	Syracuse Firebirds	AHL	18	5	5	10	2	4	1	0	1	2
1980–81	Binghamton Whalers	AHL	9	1	2	3	0	—	—	—	—	—
1980–81	Houston Apollos	CHL	33	7	4	11	16	—	—	—	—	—
1981–82	Cincinnati Tigers	CHL	45	6	7	13	4	4	0	0	0	25
1982–83	HC Selva	ITA-2	—	—	—	—	—	—	—	—	—	—
1983–84	HC Selva	ITA-2	20	38	55	93	10	4	10	6	16	0
1984–85	HC Auronzo	ITA	25	29	22	51	12	2	5	2	7	0
1985–86	Campbellton Tigers	RHL	40	37	57	94	31	6	2	9	11	0
CHL totals			219	68	89	157	49	15	6	2	8	29
NHL totals			103	11	17	28	33	—	—	—	—	—
