= Bernie Johnston =

Canadian ice hockey player

- Born: September 15, 1956 (age 68); Toronto, Ontario, Canada
- Height: 5 ft 11 in (180 cm)
- Weight: 185 lb (84 kg; 13 st 3 lb)
- Position: Centre
- Shot: Left
- Played for: Hartford Whalers
- NHL draft: Undrafted
- Playing career: 1976–1989

Bernie Johnston (born September 15, 1956) is a Canadian former professional ice hockey player. He played in 57 National Hockey League games with the Hartford Whalers between 1979 and 1981. The rest of his career, which lasted from 1976 to 1989, was spent in the minor leagues and in Switzerland. As a youth, he played in the 1968 Quebec International Pee-Wee Hockey Tournament with a minor ice hockey team from Toronto. After his playing career Johnston worked as a coach in Switzerland and Germany, as well as serving as general manager for the Frankfurt Lions between 1997 and 2002.

== Career statistics ==
=== Regular season and playoffs ===
			Regular season					Playoffs
Season	Team	League	GP	G	A	Pts	PIM	GP	G	A	Pts	PIM
1972–73	Ajax Knob Hill Farms	OPJAHL	30	28	42	70	32	—	—	—	—	—
1973–74	Toronto Marlboros	OHA	65	10	11	21	21	—	—	—	—	—
1974–75	Toronto Marlboros	OMJHL	47	9	29	38	20	3	1	2	3	4
1974–75	Toronto Marlboros	M-Cup	—	—	—	—	—	4	0	4	4	2
1975–76	Toronto Marlboros	OMJHL	60	22	39	61	44	10	0	4	4	8
1976–77	Syracuse Blazers	NAHL	73	53	71	124	40	9	1	9	10	2
1977–78	Maine Mariners	AHL	68	28	29	57	35	11	2	7	9	6
1978–79	Maine Mariners	AHL	70	29	66	95	40	10	2	5	7	8
1979–80	Hartford Whalers	NHL	32	8	13	21	8	3	0	1	1	0
1979–80	Springfield Indians	AHL	41	18	36	54	25	—	—	—	—	—
1980–81	Hartford Whalers	NHL	25	4	11	15	8	—	—	—	—	—
1980–81	Binghamton Whalers	AHL	38	14	22	36	36	3	0	0	0	0
1981–82	EHC Kloten	NLA	38	22	26	48	—	—	—	—	—	—
1981–82	Maine Mariners	AHL	—	—	—	—	—	4	0	5	5	0
1982–83	EHC Kloten	NLA	38	36	32	68	—	—	—	—	—	—
1982–83	Maine Mariners	AHL	11	7	2	9	2	8	4	1	5	4
1983–84	EHC Kloten	NLA	38	31	34	65	—	—	—	—	—	—
1984–85	EHC Basel	NLB	32	33	46	79	—	—	—	—	—	—
1985–86	EHC Basel	NLB	36	27	29	56	46	2	2	0	2	4
1985–86	Hershey Bears	AHL	15	2	9	11	6	18	2	3	5	11
1986–87	EHC Bülach	SWI-3	—	—	—	—	—	—	—	—	—	—
1987–88	EHC Bülach	SWI-3	—	—	—	—	—	—	—	—	—	—
1988–89	EHC Bülach	NLB	12	6	8	14	38	—	—	—	—	—
1988–89	Maine Mariners	AHL	11	2	3	5	0	—	—	—	—	—
NHL totals			57	12	24	36	16	3	0	1	1	0
