= Al Cameron =

Canadian ice hockey player (born 1955)

- Born: October 21, 1955 (age 70) Edmonton, Alberta, Canada
- Height: 6 ft 1 in (185 cm)
- Weight: 190 lb (86 kg; 13 st 8 lb)
- Position: Defenceman
- Shot: Left
- Played for: Detroit Red Wings; Winnipeg Jets
- NHL draft: 37th overall, 1975; Detroit Red Wings
- Playing career: 1975–1981

Alan Richard Cameron (born October 21, 1955) is a Canadian former professional ice hockey defenceman.

Cameron played two seasons with the New Westminster Bruins of the WHL, from 1973 to 1975, where in the last year, the Bruins advanced to the Memorial Cup finals, eventually losing to the Toronto Marlboros.

He was drafted 37th overall by the Detroit Red Wings in the 1975 NHL Amateur Draft and eventually played 282 games with the Red Wings and the Winnipeg Jets in the NHL.

== Career statistics ==
=== Regular season and playoffs ===
			Regular season					Playoffs
Season	Team	League	GP	G	A	Pts	PIM	GP	G	A	Pts	PIM
1972–73	Chilliwack Bruins	BCJHL	—	—	—	—	—	—	—	—	—	—
1972–73	New Westminster Bruins	WCHL	1	0	0	0	0	—	—	—	—	—
1973–74	New Westminster Bruins	WCHL	67	4	17	21	90	11	0	2	2	24
1974–75	New Westminster Bruins	WCHL	69	10	26	36	184	16	2	3	5	54
1974–75	New Westminster Bruins	M-Cup	—	—	—	—	—	3	0	0	0	0
1975–76	Detroit Red Wings	NHL	38	2	8	10	49	—	—	—	—	—
1975–76	Kalamazoo Wings	IHL	43	3	17	20	71	—	—	—	—	—
1976–77	Detroit Red Wings	NHL	80	3	13	16	112	—	—	—	—	—
1977–78	Detroit Red Wings	NHL	63	2	7	9	94	7	0	1	1	2
1977–78	Kansas City Red Wings	CHL	6	1	6	7	4	—	—	—	—	—
1978–79	Detroit Red Wings	NHL	9	0	3	3	8	—	—	—	—	—
1978–79	Kansas City Red Wings	CHL	64	5	25	30	89	4	0	1	1	2
1979–80	Winnipeg Jets	NHL	63	3	11	14	72	—	—	—	—	—
1979–80	Tulsa Oilers	CHL	15	1	2	3	20	—	—	—	—	—
1980–81	Winnipeg Jets	NHL	29	1	2	3	21	—	—	—	—	—
1980–81	Tulsa Oilers	CHL	42	6	26	32	38	3	0	0	0	2
NHL totals			282	11	44	55	356	7	0	1	1	2
