= Steve Donner =

American businessman and sports team owner

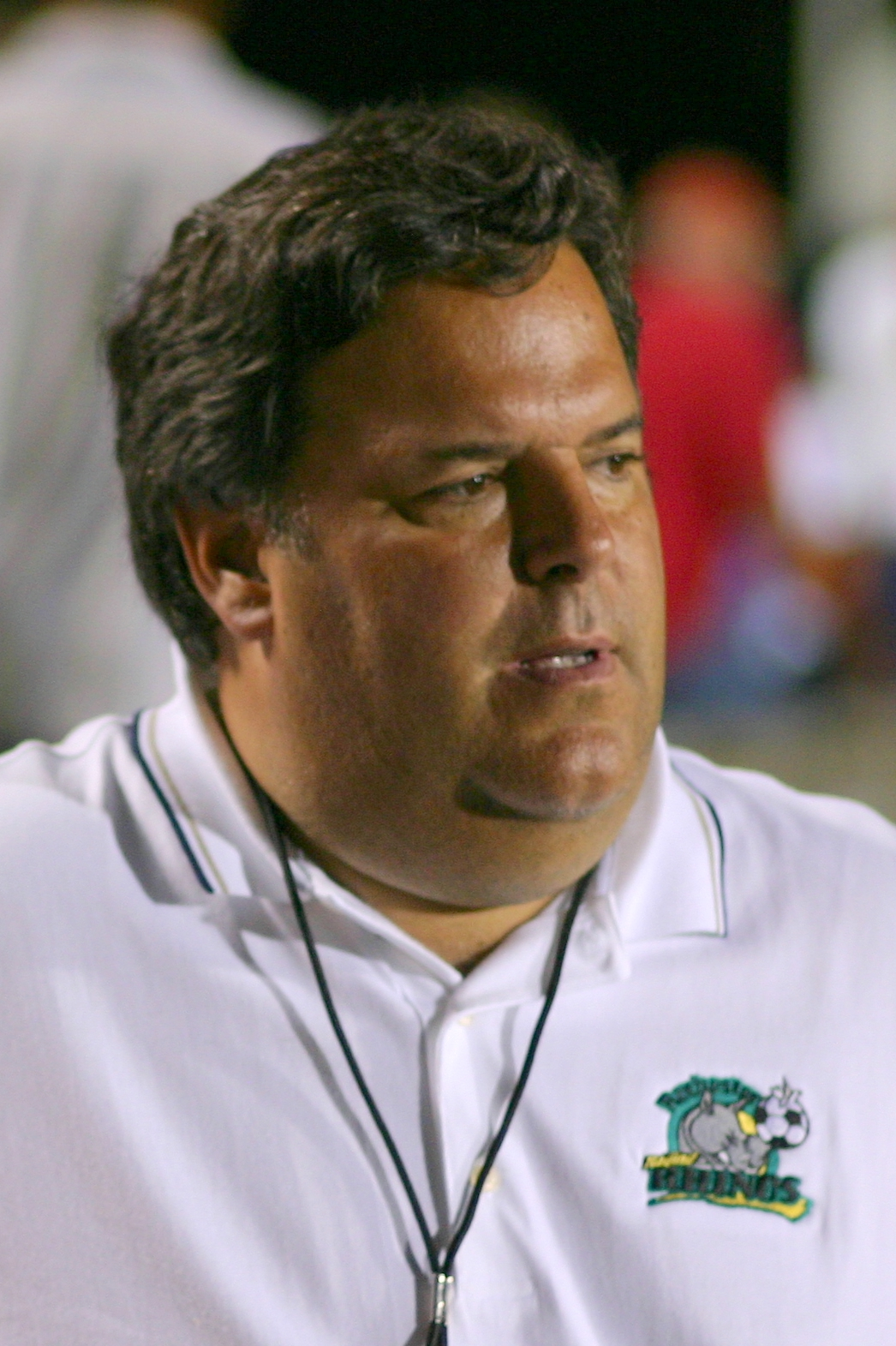
- Steve Donner
- Born: May 7, 1957 (age 69); Rochester, New York
- Occupations: Sports Executive and Team Owner

Steve Donner is an American sports executive, team owner, and manager. He is the founding commissioner of the Professional Box Lacrosse Association, and the co-owner of the Elmira Mammoth of the Federal Prospects Hockey League. He is the former president and CEO of the Rochester Americans of the American Hockey League, and the founder and CEO of the Rochester Knighthawks of the National Lacrosse League, the Rochester Rattlers of Major League Lacrosse and the Rochester Raging Rhinos of the United Soccer League. He been chief executive of numerous other sports teams and ventures.

== Early life ==
Steve Donner was born and raised in Rochester, New York where he grew up in the city's 19th Ward neighborhood. He graduated from Aquinas Institute high school in 1975 and attended the University of Dayton, where he played goaltender on the school's varsity hockey team.

After graduating from Dayton, he took a position in the front office of the reborn Dayton Gems of the International Hockey League for the 1979–80 season. When the Gems ceased operations after a single season, he returned to Rochester where he was hired in the marketing department by his hometown Rochester Americans in 1980. He worked for the Amerks for three years. After the team captured the Calder Cup championship in the 1982–83 season, he was hired as Sales Manager by the parent Buffalo Sabres. Eventually being promoted to Director of Marketing and Sales, he remained with the Sabres for nearly a decade, leaving after the 1991–92 season to join the NHL expansion Tampa Bay Lightning as Vice President of Sales and Marketing.

Faced with the challenge of selling a sport in an area that had never had major professional hockey before, Steve helped establish fan interest as the franchise debuted in their temporary home in the antiquated 11,000-seat Expo Hall on the Florida State Fairgrounds. After one season, the Lightning transitioned to the Florida Suncoast Dome, an indoor stadium on the opposite side of the bay in St. Petersburg. Originally built for baseball, the rechristened “ThunderDome” seated over 27,000 in its new hockey configuration. Donner was credited with establishing Fan Land, a fan interactive area in the ThunderDome Sports Complex which was the first of its kind in pro sports. With the help of numerous large crowds in the immense dome, the Lightning finished the 1993–94 season second in the NHL in attendance, with a per game average of 19,398, second only to the Detroit Red Wings.

== Professional team ownership ==
=== Rochester Americans ===
In July 1994, Steve returned home when he was named president and Chief Administrative Officer of the Rochester Americans, who were owned at the time by Seymour and Northrup Knox of the Buffalo Sabres. The move was originally part of a three-year operations agreement giving Steve the option to purchase the franchise at the conclusion of the term. However, that timeline was shortened when the Sabres named Doug Moss as their new president. After examining the team finances, Moss offered to let Donner take control sooner. Within months, Donner assembled a group of six investors, and at the conclusion of the 1994-95 AHL season, Donner and his partners became the owners for the franchise. Donner would become the managing general partner of the new ownership group, and remain as president and CEO of the franchise.

Success came quick for Donner's Americans. Under the leadership of Head Coach John Tortorella, the 1995-96 Amerks captured the American Hockey League crown in the Donner group's first year as team owners. After a mediocre third-place division finish in the regular season, the Amerks swept the Adirondack Red Wings 3–0 in the opening playoff round and the Cornwall Aces 4–0 in the quarterfinals, and eliminated the Syracuse Crunch 4 games to 1 in the semifinals. A thrilling 2–1 victory over the Portland Pirates at the Blue Cross Arena on June 13 gave the Amerks a 4–3 series win and the franchise's sixth and most recent Calder Cup championship.

=== Rochester Raging Rhinos ===
In the summer of 1995, Donner was at a baseball game with longtime friend and Rochester native Chris Economides, then owner of the Kansas City Attack of the indoor National Professional Soccer League. With Frontier Field, Rochester's new minor league baseball stadium, scheduled to open the following year, they discussed the feasibility of bringing outdoor professional soccer back to the Flower City for the first time since the Rochester Flash folded a decade earlier. Following a successful World Cup hosted by the United States in 1994, and with the forthcoming inauguration of MLS, soccer interest in the US was growing rapidly, and the two agreed that the timing was opportune. Economides reached out to Richard Goff, Commissioner of the six-team Second Division A-League, about the possibility of securing a franchise for Rochester. Donner, in turn contacted businessman and friend Frank DuRoss of Utica, NY as a potential investor. The three submitted a formal bid, and in January, 1996, they were awarded an expansion franchise to begin play in the 1996 season.

The team was christened as the Rochester Raging Rhinos, and former Lancer favorites Pat Ercoli and Frank Odoi were named as head coach and assistant. The franchise would begin play at the University of Rochester's historic Fauver Stadium while waiting for the completion of Frontier Field.

The franchise soon become the envy of the soccer world. After drawing respectable crowds at the 6,000-seat Fauver Stadium to begin the season, their move to Frontier Field made Rhinos games the place to be. On July 12, 1996, the Raging Rhinos made their Frontier Field debut, defeating the Montreal Impact 3-2 before a raucous overflow crowd of 14,717. Sellout crowds would become the norm at Frontier Field for years to come. The Rhinos would finish the season in fourth place in the seven-team A-League, notching 14 wins in the 27-game regular season. After eliminating the first-place Impact 2 games to 1 in the semifinals (drawing a crowd of 14,809 at their only home game on September 21), the Rhinos advanced to the Championship Final, where they were defeated by the Seattle Sounders 2–0 in Seattle.

But the Rhinos on-field success was not limited to A-League competition. In the US Open Cup, the Raging Rhinos eliminated the MLS club Tampa Bay Mutiny 4–3 in the quarterfinals, and their MLS counterpart Colorado Rapids 3–0 in the semifinals before finally bowing to the MLS DC United in the 1996 US Open Cup Final at RFK Stadium. Frontier Field crowds of 12,428 and 12,179 were the largest crowds of the entire tournament, including games hosted by MLS teams.

=== Other ventures ===
Donner helped bring professional soccer and lacrosse to his home town of Rochester, New York. As the governor of the Knighthawks, he was involved in the transition of the Major Indoor Lacrosse League from a single-entity ownership organization into the reconstituted National Lacrosse League in 1997. He was also instrumental in the development and construction of the ESL Sports Centre and PAETEC Park in Rochester.

Teams he has owned or managed have won championships in the American Hockey League, the National Lacrosse League, the A-League, and Major League Lacrosse. He has brought a total of eight championship teams to the City of Rochester.

Donner was AHL executive of the year in 1996 and was inducted into the United Soccer Leagues Hall of Fame in 2006, the Frontier Field Walk of Fame in 2014 and the Rochester Knighthawks Hall of Fame in 2014. He spearheaded the relocation of the Orlando Titans of the National Lacrosse League from New York City and was instrumental in bringing the Austin USL franchise to Orlando, which became the MLS Orlando City SC.

In 2018, he led an ownership group called South Carolina Pro Hockey, LLC, that purchased the Greenville Swamp Rabbits of the ECHL. The group sold the Swamp Rabbits in 2020.

On April 27, 2022, Donner announced the establishment of the Elmira Mammoth hockey franchise as a "hybrid expansion" member of the Federal Prospects Hockey League. The team is owned by Tadross Donner Sports and Entertainment, of which Donner is a Partner, and Donner will act as the President of the new franchise.

During the 2022-23 season Donner was implicated in controversy when it was discovered that a player, Nikita Andrusenko, who had been invited to training camp, was wanted in Utah for rape. Andrusenko was later arrested at First Arena. It was alleged that Donner was fully aware of the warrant and had been actively helping him hide in Elmira.

Following the 2022-23 season Donner was evicted from First Arena for failing to pay bills, owing nearly $1,000,000.

In June 2022, Donner was named Commissioner of the fledgling Professional Box Lacrosse Association, an eight-team regional professional men's indoor lacrosse league which he co-founded.
