= LECOM Event Center =

Sports facility in Elmira, New York

Coordinates: 42.08835°N 76.808482°W

- Entertainment First
- Location within New York State Location within the United States
- Former names: Coach USA Center (2000–2004); First Arena (2004–2024)
- Location: 155 North Main Street; Elmira, New York 14901
- Owner: Stemerman Sports & Entertainment
- Operator: Stemerman Sports & Entertainment
- Capacity: 3,784 (ice hockey)
- Surface: Multi-surface

Construction
- Groundbreaking: November 24, 1999
- Built: 1999-2000
- Opened: November 11, 2000
- Cost: $16 million ($29.9 million in 2025 dollars)
- Architect: BBB Architects Ltd.
- Services engineers: The Mitchell Partnership, Inc.
- General contractor: Welliver McGuire

Tenants
- Elmira Jackals (UHL/ECHL) (2000–2017); Elmira Enforcers (FPHL) (2018–2021); Elmira Jr. Enforcers (USPHL) (2020–2023); Elmira Mammoth (FPHL) (2022–2023); Elmira Renegades (PBLA) (2022–2023); Elmira River Sharks (FPHL) (2023–2024); Elmira Aviators (NAHL) (2024–present)

The LECOM Event Center is a 3,784-seat multi-purpose facility located in downtown Elmira, New York. It features two ice surfaces, a full-service restaurant and bar, a food service center for the recreational rink, video game arcade, 31 luxury suites, party/group outing facilities, and meeting/community rooms among other amenities. The arena opened in 2000 as the Coach USA Center and changed names to the First Arena in 2004. It was the home of the Elmira Jackals from its opening until 2017 and the Elmira Enforcers of the Federal Prospects Hockey League from 2018 to 2021. It is located on the corner of W. Gray Street and N. Main Street.

The arena's naming rights are held by Lake Erie College of Osteopathic Medicine (LECOM).

== History ==
=== Establishment (1998–2007) ===
On March 2, 1998, Elmira city officials announced Lauridon Sports Management as the developed and operator the city's $11.6 million proposed arena. By September, the Midtown Plaza on North Main Street was selected as the site for the arena. Lauridon then committed $5 million to the $15 million project. In July 1999, five downtown businesses were notified of eviction from their properties and Elmira City Council unanimously voted to begin eminent domain proceedings against Paul Navestad, the only property owner whom the city could not reach an agreement. Demolition began on September 21. Thomas Freeman, president of Coach USA Transit Services, signed an agreement to pay $1 million for the arena to be called the Coach USA Center. By October 4, the Chemung County Legislature requested the $7.25 million promised by Lauridon Sports Management and its private investor for the project, Mostafa Afr of Ann Arbor, Michigan, must be in place by December 1, or the county would pull its $1.25 million in support for the project. On October 26: Key Bank approved Afr's application for a $7.25 million loan to help build the center. The arena then held its groundbreaking ceremony on November 24, 1999.

On January 28, 2000, the Chemung County Industrial Development Agency closed on the county's $1.25 million loan to the project and the rest of the financing was completed in February with the Afrs and a vice president from Key Bank in Albany closed on a $5.5 million loan. Tamer Afr, Mostafa Afr's son and business partner, announced that Global Spectrum had replaced Lauridon Sports Management as the arena facility manager. This lasted three months before they announced that SMG would manage the arena instead. The City Council also approved a roof design for the project in June 2000 that increased the estimated cost of the arena to $16 million.

On March 27, 2000, the United Hockey League awarded an expansion franchise to Elmira to begin play in the 2000–01 season. The team name was revealed as the Elmira Jackals. The Twin Tier Amateur Hockey Association and Tamer Afr also signed a contract for youth hockey to be played at the arena. On November 11, the first event is held at the center when the Jackals played their home opener against the Knoxville Speed. The Moody Blues were the first musical entertainment at the arena the following night.

In October 2003, the Coach USA Center was renamed First Arena. In April 2006, Mostafa Afr announced that Robbie Nichols would take over operation of both First Arena and the Jackals. He became the arena's eighth general manager in less than six years and its fourth manager in the past year.

=== Financial troubles (2007–2016) ===
On October 31, 2007, Elmira Downtown Arena (EDA), the arena operator, entered into an Installment Agreement to pay taxes on which it had defaulted. EDA then defaulted on the agreement on March 31, 2008. From 2009 to 2011, the arena continued to fail to pay its taxes. On January 17, 2012, the 4:30 p.m. deadline passed to pay $123,849 in overdue taxes and a foreclosure order was then signed by Chemung County Court judge Peter Buckley, starting a "redemption period" that was to end February 29. During that period, Southern Tier Economic Development (STED), the arena's owner, could get the property back by paying the overdue tax balance plus a 10% penalty totaling $136,234. On March 12, the county legislature voted to table an attempt by STED to buy back the arena. The legislature also called for the hiring of a consultant to investigate the arena's financial status and physical condition.

The EDA responded on March 22, 2012, by filing a lawsuit against Chemung County, county executive Tom Santulli, county treasurer Joseph Sartori and STED to try to force the county to accept the repurchase offer on the arena. EDA and M-Team LLC, a Michigan corporation, also filed a lawsuit against former arena general manager Robbie Nichols and former assistant general manager Donald Lewis alleging they attempted to sabotage the arena operator, the Jackals and First Arena. EDA and Key Bank filed two more lawsuits in April accusing the county of not following proper procedure in administering its foreclosure process. County judge Judith O'Shea dismissed the lawsuit filed March 22 against county officials and the suit filed against Nichols and Lewis. On May 17, 2012, a memorandum of understanding was signed by Tamer Afr for EDA, Santulli for the county and Kevin Keeley as president of STED that allowed the Jackals to play in the facility during the 2012–13 season. The agreement also allowed EDA to continue operating the arena but gave the county the same rights as STED to oversee arena operations.

On February 5, 2013, officials announced that Elm Arena LLC, a group headed by Tom Freeman, president of First Air in Big Flats, had been named as the new operator of First Arena, replacing the Afr family. The agreement ended all pending litigation. On April 10, the Jackals held a press conference to name Tom Freeman and Nathan Cook the new owners of the First Arena and the Jackals. In September 2014, the Jackals were donated from Freeman to a private non-profit community organization, Twin Tiers Economic Development (TTED), a 30-member board to oversee the organization.

=== Chemung County operation (2016–present) ===
On January 28, 2016, the Chemung County Industrial Development Agency (IDA) entered into an "option to purchase agreement" with a down payment of $300,000, giving the IDA time to consider all factors and options about the future of the arena. The IDA then assumed temporary ownership of First Arena and the Jackals until a new owner could be found beginning in April 2016. The IDA gave tours of the facility to several potential buyers hoping to be in a position to select a buyer by late July or early August 2016. However, no purchase proposals were received by the June 24 deadline. Negotiations continued with three interested parties. On August 24, the process had been narrowed to one party, who was also interested in buying the Jackals. The IDA hoped to complete the transaction by January 2017.

In January 2017, the Chemung County legislature voted to maintain the arena to be open to the public but asked the Elmira City Council to contribute nearly $1.5 million of taxpayer money over five years to repair the ice plant and pay back bills. They council voted against it, saying that doing so would require a 3% property tax increase. The Chemung County IDA argued that they only had enough funds to operate the arena for another week. On February 10, the IDA presented a counteroffer to the Elmira City Council asking for $750,000 to repair the ice plant. They indicated that an answer is required by close of business on February 13, but extended the deadline for an answer from the city to the morning of February 16. The council decided that they would be unable to provide any financial assistance to the county for First Arena. The IDA hoped to be able to keep the arena open until the Jackals' season ends in mid-April.

On March 7, the potential buyer dropped the request for taxpayer funding. The buyer also needed to submit paperwork to the ECHL by March 9 to ask for approval for a change in ownership, and to affirm that the Jackals would play the next season. On March 10, it was announced that local businessman Brian Barrett would take ownership of First Arena, but the Jackals would cease operations at the conclusion of the 2016–17 season. Finalization of the deal was contingent upon the new owner obtaining another hockey franchise. Possibilities were from an announced new amateur league called the International Developmental Hockey League (IDHL), which listed a team called the Elmira Express on its web site, or the Federal Prospects Hockey League, a low-level professional league. The Jackals played their final game on April 8, 2017. On June 27, 2017, Barrett backed out of negotiations for buying the arena.

On July 5, 2017, Elmira Pioneers co-owner and former Jackals coach and general manager Robbie Nichols expressed a desire to bring a Federal Prospects Hockey League team to Elmira for the 2017–18 season. However, after meeting with county officials and the IDA, Nichols announced that they could not come to an agreement and the plan was put on hold. Nichols offered to lease the arena for a minimum of two years but the IDA rejected the proposal, saying it would leave them financially exposed. The IDA presented a counter proposal to Nichols, which he and his group rejected.

On October 3, 2017, the City of Elmira approved a resolution proposed by the IDA to apply for a "Restore New York" grant to help repair the arena's ice plant and roof. The repairs were intended to help the IDA get the building up to par so it can be sold. Only cities can apply for such a grant. In January 2018, the IDA was still trying to get professional or college hockey into First Arena, focusing on Elmira College, located a few blocks from the arena, whose team was using the Murray Athletic Center, eight miles from campus.

On June 25, 2018, the IDA reopened negotiations with Robbie Nichols to bring a Federal Prospects Hockey League team to Elmira with Nichols leasing the arena, not purchasing it. On July 17, Nichols and the IDA announced that Nichols would lease the arena for a year with renewals for the following two years and an option to purchase. Nichols brought in a Federal Prospects Hockey League (FPHL) franchise and intends to hold other events. The new FHL team was announced as the Elmira Enforcers and began play in the 2018–19 season. Nichols, and his ownership group CAN-USA, operated and paid for the upkeep of the arena during the initial three-year lease agreement.

In July 2021, the IDA took over operations of the arena again when the county and CAN-USA failed to reach a lease extension in time. On July 29, the IDA reported the arena needed $6–8 million in repairs and upgrades in order to continue operations and was considering the option of demolishing the building instead. The Enforcers were then forced to go dormant for the 2021–22 season citing lack of communication from the IDA. Nichols hopes to bring the team back in 2022 if the two sides continue negotiations.

The initial bid to demolish the building was made at $1.2 million. In November 2021, the county had a second assessment made on the arena and was found to have no critical issues in order to keep the building with a minimum of about $500,000 in Americans with Disabilities Act (ADA) upgrades needed to re-open. There were several recommendations made that would significantly increase the cost of repairs, such as $1.5 million for new ice rink equipment. Later that month, the county made a lease agreement with Tadross Donner Sports and Entertainment, LLC. (TDSE) to operate the arena effective immediately and planned to re-open.

On April 27, 2022, TDSE's Steve Donner announced that a new FPHL franchise will be occupying the arena beginning with the 2022–2023 hockey season. The team will be known as the Elmira Mammoth, taking its namesake from the rich history of the Chemung River. The team's colors will be orange, purple, and white.

On July 30, 2024, the First Arena was renamed to the LECOM Event Center.

== Sports ==
First Arena is mostly known for the Elmira Jackals ice hockey team that competed in the ECHL and the United Hockey League between 2000 and 2017. First Arena has also hosted many other sporting events such as basketball, X-treme Ice Racing, and pro wrestling from WWE and TNA Wrestling.

In 2018, the minor professional Elmira Enforcers began play as a member of the Federal Prospects Hockey League. The team was owned by Elmira Pioneers co-owner Robbie Nichols, who also had the option to purchase the arena. A dispute between the county and Nichols forced the team to disband in 2020, leaving the arena to sit empty until TDSE agreed to a lease in 2021.

In the year 2023, First Arena has struggled to stay afloat & maintain tenants. First Arena is used by local youth & high school ice hockey, Elmira College NCAA ice hockey, and a new FPHL franchise expected to open at the start of the 2023–2024 season.

== Entertainment ==
The arena also hosts musical acts, family productions, and many other large entertainment performances such as concerts and circuses.

The following is a partial list of notable concerts and other entertainment events that have taken place at the LECOM Event Center:

- November 20, 2000 – Moody Blues
- December 18, 2001 – Kenny Rogers Christmas Show
- April 2002 – UHL finals: Elmira Jackals vs. Muskegon Fury
- November 9, 2002 – Bob Dylan
- April 2004 – UHL finals: Elmira Jackals vs. Muskegon Fury
- April 8, 2004 – Godsmack, Ill Niño & Dropbox
- December 20, 2004 – Kenny Rogers
- December 17, 2005 – Fall Brawl Tour: Staind, P.O.D., Taproot & Flyleaf
- January 2006 – Dora The Explorer
- March 2006 – NCAA Men's Hockey Tournament
- October 19, 2006 – Dierks Bentley along with Miranda Lambert
- March 8, 2008 – Larry the Cable Guy
- April 18, 2008 – Larry The Cable Guy
- December 13, 2008 – Vince Gill & Amy Grant Christmas
- January 16, 2009 – Bill Engvall
- October 24, 2009 – Lamb of God, GWAR & Job for a Cowboy
- October 27, 2009 – Willie Nelson
- December 12, 2009 – Kenny Rogers
- April 15, 2010 – Three Days Grace, Chevelle, & Adelita's Way
- October 17, 2013 – Air Supply
- September 2022 - Justin Moore
