= Perry Florio =

American ice hockey player (born 1967)

- Born: July 15, 1967 (age 59) Long Island, New York, U.S.
- Height: 6 ft 0 in (183 cm)
- Weight: 195 lb (88 kg; 13 st 13 lb)
- Position: Defense
- Shot: Right
- Played for: Johnstown Chiefs; Knoxville Cherokees; Hershey Bears
- NHL draft: 72nd overall, 1985; Los Angeles Kings
- Playing career: 1989–1995

Perry Florio (born July 15, 1967), is an American former professional ice hockey player who spent the majority of his career with the Johnstown Chiefs of the ECHL.

== Personal life ==
Florio is married, has two children, and three siblings. Both of his parents are deceased.

== Career ==
Florio played the 1986 and 1987 seasons for the Providence College Friars, leading the team in penalty minutes both years. Following the 1986 season, Florio was named to the United States men's national junior ice hockey team for the World Junior Championships.

Florio transferred to Northern Michigan University, where he played ten games in his senior year in 1989.

He started his pro career in the 1989-90 season for the Knoxville Cherokees of the East Coast Hockey League before going to the Johnstown Chiefs the next season. Save for a three-game stint with the Hershey Bears of the American Hockey League in 1992, he played the rest of his professional career in Johnstown, retiring after the 1995 season; he served as the team's captain, and was named to the franchise's 20th Anniversary Team. At the time of his retirement, he was the all-time ECHL leader in games played. He was further honored by being named to the ECHL's all-time 10th Anniversary Team in 1997.

Florio also played in Roller Hockey International for the Philadelphia Bulldogs in 1994 and 1995; he played in the RHI All-Star Game in 1994 where he was named the game's MVP.

== Coaching ==
After retiring as a player, Florio became an assistant coach for the Roanoke Express of the ECHL in 1998, and was named head coach and general manager in 2000. After making some controversial and unsuccessful trades, he was fired in January 2003 with the team just out of first place, a move unpopular with the players. He was promptly hired as interim head coach for the Anchorage Aces, with whom he finished the season, before going on to be the head coach for the Pee Dee Pride in the 2004 and 2005 seasons. He also was the head coach of the Elmira Jackals of the United Hockey League in 2006.

== Career statistics ==
			Regular season					Playoffs
Season	Team	League	GP	G	A	Pts	PIM	GP	G	A	Pts	PIM
1985–86	Providence College	NCAA	39	4	5	9	90	—	—	—	—	—
1986–87	Providence College	NCAA	23	1	6	7	58	—	—	—	—	—
1987–88	Northern Michigan University	NCAA	—	—	—	—	—	—	—	—	—	—
1988–89	Northern Michigan University	NCAA	10	0	4	4	8	—	—	—	—	—
1989–90	Knoxville Cherokees	ECHL	53	8	16	24	114	—	—	—	—	—
1990–91	Johnstown Chiefs	ECHL	57	8	36	44	179	9	1	4	5	30
1991–92	Johnstown Chiefs	ECHL	63	10	35	45	247	6	0	0	0	21
1992–93	Hershey Bears	AHL	3	0	0	0	0	—	—	—	—	—
1992–93	Johnstown Chiefs	ECHL	61	11	32	43	162	5	0	1	1	25
1993–94	Johnstown Chiefs	ECHL	62	12	40	52	117	3	0	1	1	42
1994–95	Johnstown Chiefs	ECHL	62	3	28	31	94	4	0	6	6	12
ECHL totals			358	52	187	239	913	27	1	12	13	130
