= Malcolm Cameron (ice hockey) =

Canadian ice hockey coach

Personal information
- Born: August 30, 1969 (age 56) Cole Harbour, Nova Scotia, Canada

Sport
- Sport: Ice hockey
- University team: Dalhousie University; Acadia University

Malcolm Cameron (born August 30, 1969) is a Canadian professional ice hockey coach. He was the head coach for six ECHL teams, including the Cincinnati Cyclones, Long Beach Ice Dogs, Texas Wildcatters, Florida Everblades, Elmira Jackals, and Wichita Thunder. Cameron was also the head coach of the Regina Pats in the Western Hockey League.

In the ECHL, he is fifth in wins (401) and fifth in games coached (771) as of the 2018–19 ECHL season.

== Early life ==
Born in Cole Harbour, Nova Scotia, Cameron played ice hockey with Dalhousie Tigers at Dalhousie University and Acadia Axemen and Axewomen at Acadia University.

== Career ==
Cameron played five seasons of professional hockey for several minor league teams. Cameron then joined the coaching ranks as an assistant with the Lubbock Cotton Kings of the Western Professional Hockey League.

Malcolm led two ECHL teams to significant turnarounds, which rank seventh and eighth-best for improving a team from one year to the next in ECHL history. In the 2004–05 season, he took over as head coach for the Long Beach Ice Dogs and guided them to a 43–20–9 record and a 44-point improvement. Cameron later took over as the bench boss of the Texas Wildcatters for the 2006–07 season and led them to a 41–22–9 record and 46-point improvement. In the 2007–08 season, he set an ECHL record for fewest regulation losses in a season, going 52–9–11 and recorded 115 points, which is tied for second-most in league history.

After the Elmira Jackals fired Cameron following the 2010–11 season, Cameron joined the Western Hockey League's Regina Pats as an assistant coach for the 2011–12 and 2012–13 seasons. He was promoted to head coach the following season, winning the WHL’s East Division regular season title with a record of 39–26-4-3. He was released after one season in 2014.

In 2016, Cameron returned to the ECHL with the Wichita Thunder as head coach. He left after three seasons, a 84–105–27 record, and one playoff appearance.

After stints coaching in Italy with SV Kaltern and in Romania with Gyergyói HK, Cameron was appointed as the new head coach and head of hockey operations at Scottish EIHL side Glasgow Clan in July 2021. However, after failing to win any of the first 16 league and cup games of the 2022-23 season, Cameron and Glasgow parted ways in October 2022.
