= Mark Napier (ice hockey) =

Canadian ice hockey player

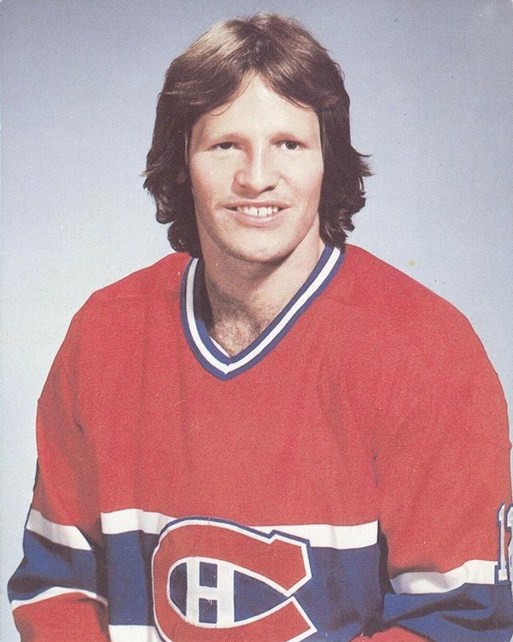
- Born: January 28, 1957 (age 69) North York, Ontario, Canada
- Height: 5 ft 10 in (178 cm)
- Weight: 185 lb (84 kg; 13 st 3 lb)
- Position: Right wing
- Shot: Left
- Played for: Toronto Toros; Birmingham Bulls; Montreal Canadiens; Minnesota North Stars; Edmonton Oilers; Buffalo Sabres
- NHL draft: 10th overall, 1977; Montreal Canadiens
- Playing career: 1975–1993
Medal record
Representing Canada
Ice hockey
World Championships
Bronze medal – third place	1982 Finland

Mark Robert Napier (born January 28, 1957) is a Canadian former professional ice hockey player who played over a thousand professional games between the National Hockey League and World Hockey Association between 1975 and 1989. He was a two-time Stanley Cup winner in the NHL.

== Biography ==
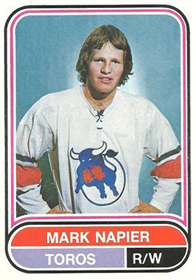
1975-76 card of Mark Napier for Toronto Toros

As a youth, Napier played in the 1968 and 1969 Quebec International Pee-Wee Hockey Tournaments with minor ice hockey teams from Toronto.

An alumnus of the Toronto Marlboros organization, Napier turned pro as a teenager for the Toronto Toros of the WHA and also played for the Birmingham Bulls. One year before the WHA folded, Napier joined the Montreal Canadiens, winning the Stanley Cup with them in 1979. He also played for the Minnesota North Stars before joining the Edmonton Oilers, winning his second Cup with them in 1985. In 1987, he was traded again, and would finish his career in North America in a Buffalo Sabres uniform before playing three seasons in Italy.

In 1997, Napier was hired as the head coach of the Toronto St. Michael's Majors of the Ontario Hockey League. He was the president of the NHL Alumni Association for 12 years and retired in 2016.

== Awards and achievements ==
- 1974–75 - Jim Mahon Memorial Trophy
- 1975 - Memorial Cup (Toronto)
- 1975–76 - WHA - Lou Kaplan Trophy (Rookie of the Year) (Toronto)
- 1978–79 - NHL - Stanley Cup (Montreal)
- 1982 - Team Canada - Bronze medal
- 1985 - NHL - Stanley Cup (Edmonton)

== Career statistics ==
=== Regular season and playoffs ===
			Regular season					Playoffs
Season	Team	League	GP	G	A	Pts	PIM	GP	G	A	Pts	PIM
1972–73	Wexford Raiders	MetJHL	44	41	27	68	201	—	—	—	—	—
1973–74	Toronto Marlboros	OHA-Jr.	70	47	46	93	63	—	—	—	—	—
1974–75	Toronto Marlboros	OMJHL	61	66	64	130	106	23	24	24	48	13
1974–75	Toronto Marlboros	MC	—	—	—	—	—	4	4	4	8	4
1975–76	Toronto Toros	WHA	78	43	50	93	20	—	—	—	—	—
1976–77	Birmingham Bulls	WHA	80	60	36	96	24	—	—	—	—	—
1977–78	Birmingham Bulls	WHA	79	33	32	65	90	5	0	2	2	14
1978–79	Montreal Canadiens	NHL	54	11	20	31	11	12	3	2	5	2
1979–80	Montreal Canadiens	NHL	76	16	33	49	7	10	2	6	8	0
1980–81	Montreal Canadiens	NHL	79	35	36	71	24	3	0	0	0	2
1981–82	Montreal Canadiens	NHL	80	40	41	81	14	5	3	2	5	0
1982–83	Montreal Canadiens	NHL	73	40	27	67	6	3	0	0	0	0
1983–84	Montreal Canadiens	NHL	5	3	2	5	0	—	—	—	—	—
1983–84	Minnesota North Stars	NHL	58	13	28	41	17	12	3	2	5	0
1984–85	Minnesota North Stars	NHL	39	10	18	28	2	—	—	—	—	—
1984–85	Edmonton Oilers	NHL	33	9	26	35	19	18	5	5	10	7
1985–86	Edmonton Oilers	NHL	80	24	32	56	14	10	1	4	5	0
1986–87	Edmonton Oilers	NHL	62	8	13	21	2	—	—	—	—	—
1986–87	Buffalo Sabres	NHL	15	5	5	10	0	—	—	—	—	—
1987–88	Buffalo Sabres	NHL	47	10	8	18	8	6	0	3	3	0
1988–89	Buffalo Sabres	NHL	66	11	17	28	33	3	1	0	1	0
1989–90	HC Bolzano	ITA	36	68	72	140	6	6	8	6	14	2
1990–91	HC Varese	ITA	36	45	73	118	4	10	8	18	26	0
1990–91	HC Lugano	NDA	—	—	—	—	—	5	4	2	6	0
1991–92	HC Devils Milano	AL	20	29	13	42	4	—	—	—	—	—
1991–92	HC Devils Milano	ITA	11	11	14	25	0	12	15	13	28	0
1991–92	Canada	Intl	2	1	0	1	0	—	—	—	—	—
1992–93	HC Devils Milano	AL	27	19	19	38	4	—	—	—	—	—
1992–93	HC Devils Milano	ITA	16	13	23	36	2	11	6	9	15	0
WHA totals			237	136	118	254	134	5	0	2	2	14
NHL totals			767	235	306	541	157	82	18	24	42	11
ITA totals			99	137	182	319	12	39	37	46	83	2

=== International ===
Year	Team	Event	GP	G	A	Pts	PIM
1982	Canada	WC	9	3	1	4	0

Preceded by Bruce Baker	Montreal Canadiens first-round draft pick 1977	Succeeded by Norm Dupont
