= Elmira Jackals =

Ice hockey team

- City: Elmira, New York
- League: ECHL
- Conference: Eastern
- Division: North
- Founded: 2000 (In the UHL)
- Home arena: First Arena
- Colors: Navy blue, red, silver, white
- Owner(s): Chemung County Industrial Development Agency
- Affiliates: Anaheim Ducks, Buffalo Sabres, Columbus Blue Jackets, New Jersey Devils, Ottawa Senators (NHL)

Franchise history
- 2000–2017: Elmira Jackals

Championships
- Regular season titles: 1 (2001–02)
- Division titles: 3 (2001–02, 2009–10, 2011–12)
- Conference titles: 2 (2001–02, 2003–04)

The Elmira Jackals were a professional minor league ice hockey team based in Elmira, New York. They were members of the United Hockey League from 2000 to 2007 and the ECHL from 2007 to 2017. The Jackals played their home games at First Arena.

On March 10, 2017, after unsuccessfully trying to the sell the team and the arena, the Chemung County Industrial Development Agency made an agreement to sell the arena to Brian Barrett but not the Jackals, announcing that the Jackals would fold after the end of the 2016–17 season.

== History ==
=== United Hockey League (2000–2007) ===
The Jackals were founded as a member of the United Hockey League before the 2000–01 season and were affiliated with the National Hockey League's Columbus Blue Jackets. Eventually, they severed ties with the Blue Jackets and were unaffiliated for the rest of their years in the UHL. During this time, their average attendance was 3,080 per game and they had 31 sellouts. Their largest crowd was a standing-room of 4,000, on October 13, 2006.

Prior to their first season, their home arena was still not complete and the Jackals spent the first 10 games of their inaugural season on the road. The Jackals returned to their unfinished arena in Elmira for their first home game, on November 11, 2000. The arena still had a crowd of 3,378 in the Jackals' 5–2 win. Overall, the Jackals finished that season 32–33–9 for second place in the Northeast Division and a berth in the UHL playoffs. Elmira was named franchise of the year for the UHL. The Jackals lost in the first round.

Old Elmira Jackals logo from the UHL

In their second season, the Jackals earned a 45–21–8 record with 98 points for first in the East in the regular season. In the playoffs, they won Eastern Conference Championship before falling to the Muskegon Fury in the Colonial Cup finals, where they were defeated in six games. The Jackals returned the Colonial Cup finals again two years later in 2004. They once again lost to the Fury in a four-game sweep.

In 2004–05, the Jackals fired head coach Todd Brost mid-season after posting a 19–35–5 record. Brost was replaced by former Philadelphia Flyers tough guy Dave Schultz but then posted a 5–16–0 record. The Jackals did not qualify for the playoffs for the first time. Shultz was then replaced by Perry Florio for the 2005–06 season. After another unsuccessful season, the Jackals hired a new general manager, Robbie Nichols, and a new coach, Kris Waltze. At the beginning of the 2006–07 season, Waltze posted a 13–13–0 record before being demoted to assistant coach and Nichols taking over as head coach. Nichols led the team to a 9–12–1 record before he suffered a minor stroke during an away game. Paul Gillis then filled in as head coach for the remainder of the season where the Jackals finished last in the division.

=== ECHL (2007–2017) ===
During the 2007 offseason, the Jackals joined the ECHL with a new logo, jerseys and coach Steve Martinson. They became affiliates of the National Hockey League's Columbus Blue Jackets and American Hockey League's Syracuse Crunch. Returning from a loss in Cincinnati, the team bus was involved in crash on Interstate 90 in Pennsylvania early in the morning of November 29, 2007, where several players sustained minor injuries. After three seasons of being out of playoff contention in the United Hockey League, the Jackals qualified for the 2008 Kelly Cup playoffs. The Jackals completed the season with a 41–24–0–7 with 89 points to finish second in the North Division. However, their success was short lived as they lost in the conference quarterfinals to the Reading Royals in six games.

The Jackals severed ties with the Blue Jackets and Crunch at the conclusion of the 2007–08 season and became the affiliates of the NHL's Ottawa Senators and AHL's Binghamton Senators. During the 2008–09 regular season, the Jackals went 39–26–2–5 for 85 points to finish third in the North Division. The Jackals were able to clinch a playoff berth but fell in the second round to the Cincinnati Cyclones, 4-games-to-0. The team further improved under Martinson during the 2009–10 regular season when the Jackals finished first in the East Division and made the ECHL playoffs for the third straight season. However, the Jackals fell in the first round to the Florida Everblades in five games.

In 2010, the Jackals affiliated with the NHL's Anaheim Ducks and their AHL affiliate, the Syracuse Crunch, giving the Jackals a dual NHL affiliation for the first time (as they were still affiliated the Senators). Head coach Steve Martinson, who had been with the franchise since its inaugural year in the ECHL, signed with the Chicago Express, a new expansion team of the ECHL, leaving Elmira with a 117–76–23 record. Malcolm Cameron succeeded Martinson as head coach before the 2010–11 season but was replaced mid-season by former coach and general manager Robbie Nichols. The Jackals finished the season with a third-place finish in the North Division and their fourth consecutive ECHL playoff berth, but fell in the first round to the Greenville Road Warriors in four games.

==== Ownership issues (2012–2017) ====
Pat Bingham was then hired as head coach for the 2011–12 season. On February 21, 2012, the Jackals season was threatened after the arena owner failed to pay $136,234 in taxes for three years and being hit with a foreclosure order by Chemung County. The Jackals continued to play not knowing if or when they would be locked out by the county. Jackals and First Arena's general manager, Robbie Nichols, and assistant general manager, Don Lewis, were fired in January 2012 and replaced by Matt Hufnagel. The operator of First Arena filed two lawsuits, one against Nichols and Lewis and the other against Chemung County, the county executive, county treasurer and Southern Tier Economic Development. This statement by the owner's lawyers was released: "The truth will come out. Fact of the matter is the money was here to pay the taxes. And the fact is Robbie Nichols told the Afrs it was paid." Afr, the Jackals and First Arena owner, requested that the legislature hold off their vote until June 30, 2012, to continue the foreclosure proceedings. On the ice, the Jackals had their best ECHL season and Bingham led the Jackals to a 45–22–5 record and captured the Eastern Conference regular season title. The Jackals advanced to the 2012 Kelly Cup playoffs for their fifth straight season, falling in the second round to the Florida Everblades in five games.

On May 30, 2012, the county entered into a memorandum of understanding with Elmira Downtown Arena and Southern Tier Economic Development to allow Elmira Downtown Arena to continue operating the First Arena for the 2012–13 season. The legislature ratified the agreement on July 9, 2012. On July 24, 2012, the county announced that First Arena would be sold to local businessman Tom Freeman, at the completion of the 2012–13 season. On September 8, 2012, Jackals head coach Bingham resigned one month before the season started. The Jackals were able to find a quick replacement by announcing Dwight Mullens as the team's new coach.

On April 10, 2013, the Jackals held a press conference to name Tom Freeman and Nathan Cook the new owners of the First Arena and the Jackals. Now under the new ownership, the Jackals completed the 2013–14 season with a 24–40–3–5 record and third place in the Atlantic Division but missed the playoffs for the first time since joining the ECHL in 2007.

The Devils decided to not renew their affiliation with the Jackals for the 2014–15 season and the Jackals would also not renew their affiliation agreement with the NHL's Ottawa Senators. Instead, they signed a multi-year agreement to be the ECHL affiliate of the NHL's Buffalo Sabres and the AHL's Rochester Americans. The Jackals also hired Jamie Russell as head coach. At the start of the season, the Jackals announced that they were now "community owned." Any profit above operating cost would be turned over to a local board of directors who would decide how the money should be invested in the community. However, despite an increase in average attendance from 2,200 in 2013–14 to 2,557 in 2014–15, the team still lost money. The owner indicated that an attendance of 3,200 would have been the break-even point for a profit. In 2015–16, the Jackals set a team record of 21 road wins, missed the playoffs for the third straight year, and the average attendance was still only 2,500 per game.

On April 28, 2016, the Chemung County Executive announced that the Chemung County Industrial Development Agency (IDA) would assume temporary ownership of First Arena and the Jackals until a new owner can be found. The move was made due to the ongoing team losses and the ability to pay rent to the arena combined with the county's interest in maintaining the viability of the arena and the team. The IDA announced they would use $1 million to pay off team debts so any new owner could have a nearly-clean financial slate.

After the 2015–16 season, head coach Jamie Russell left the organization after two seasons and no playoff appearances. On July 25, 2016, the Jackals announced David Leger as the new head coach for the 2016–17 season. Under Leger, the team struggled and was in last place in the league, leading management to release him on January 13, 2017. He was replaced by assistant coach Mike Duco on an interim basis.

On March 10, 2017, the IDA announced that it had an agreement to sell First Arena to local businessman Brian Barrett. As part of the agreement, it was announced that the Elmira Jackals would cease operations at the end of the season. The Jackals played their final game on April 8, a 5–0 loss at home to the Adirondack Thunder.

By June 2017, Barrett backed out of the negotiations with the county and First Arena remained operated by the IDA. One year later, the Federal Hockey League expanded to Elmira with the Elmira Enforcers in 2018, owned by Elmira Pioneers co-owner Robbie Nichols.

== Season-by-season record ==
League	Season	W	L	OTL	SOL	Pts	GF	GA	PIM	Finish	Playoffs	Head coach
UHL	2000–01	32	33	—	9	73	260	289	2015	2nd, Northeast	Lost in 1st round	Todd Brost
UHL	2001–02	45	21	—	8	98	260	216	2523	1st, East	Lost in Finals 4 games to 2	Todd Brost
UHL	2002–03	41	28	—	7	89	257	254	2250	3rd, Eastern	Lost in 2nd round 4 games to 0	Todd Brost
UHL	2003–04	33	34	—	9	75	238	256	1670	4th, Eastern	Lost in Finals 4 games to 0	Todd Brost
UHL	2004–05	24	51	—	5	53	224	310	1686	4th, Eastern	Did not qualify	Todd Brost*, Dave Schultz
UHL	2005–06	27	42	—	7	61	231	300	1815	4th, Eastern	Did not qualify	Perry Florio
UHL	2006–07	30	45	—	1	61	217	287	2087	5th, Eastern	Did not qualify	Kris Waltze*, Robbie Nichols*, Paul Gillis
ECHL	2007–08	41	24	—	7	89	245	219	1840	2nd, North	Lost in 1st round 4 games to 2	Steve Martinson
ECHL	2008–09	39	26	2	5	85	235	232	1506	3rd, North	Lost in 2nd round 4 games to 0	Steve Martinson
ECHL	2009–10	37	26	6	3	83	275	231	1721	1st, East	Lost in 1st round 3 games to 2	Steve Martinson
ECHL	2010–11	32	30	7	3	74	249	264	1541	3rd, North	Lost in 1st round 3 games to 1	Malcolm Cameron*, Robbie Nichols
ECHL	2011–12	45	22	2	3	95	228	204	1149	1st, Atlantic	Lost in 2nd round 4 games to 1	Pat Bingham
ECHL	2012–13	40	25	3	4	87	247	220	1210	2nd, Atlantic	Lost in 1st round 4 games to 2	Dwight Mullins
ECHL	2013–14	24	40	3	5	56	176	252	1026	3rd, Atlantic	Did not qualify	Dwight Mullins
ECHL	2014–15	32	33	0	7	71	186	217	1445	6th, East	Did not qualify	Jamie Russell
ECHL	2015–16	37	30	3	2	79	206	214	934	4th, East	Did not qualify	Jamie Russell
ECHL	2016–17	17	47	7	1	42	171	279	997	6th, North	Did not qualify	David Leger*, Mike Duco
UHL totals		232	254	—	46	510	1687	1912	14046	—		
ECHL totals		344	303	33	40	761	2218	2332	13369	—		
Combined totals		576	557	33	86	1271	3905	4244	27415	—		*=Replaced midseason

== Affiliates ==
=== National Hockey League ===
- Columbus Blue Jackets (2000–03; 2007–08)
- Ottawa Senators (2008–14)
- Anaheim Ducks (2010–12)
- New Jersey Devils (2013–14)
- Buffalo Sabres (2014–17)

=== American Hockey League ===
- Syracuse Crunch (2000–03; 2007–08; 2010–12)
- Binghamton Senators (2008–14)
- Albany Devils (2013–14)
- Rochester Americans (2014–17)

=== Federal Hockey League ===
- Danbury Whalers (2011–14)
- Williamsport Outlaws (2012–13)
