= Mentor Ice Breakers =

- City: Mentor, Ohio
- League: Federal Prospects Hockey League
- Founded: 2018
- Folded: 2020
- Home arena: Mentor Civic Arena
- Owner(s): Hockey Unlimited
- Head coach: Sebastian Ragno
- Website: MentorIceBreakers.com

Franchise history
- 2018–2020: Mentor Ice Breakers

The Mentor Ice Breakers were a professional ice hockey team based in Mentor, Ohio. The team was a member of the Federal Prospects Hockey League and played at Mentor Civic Arena.

== History ==
On July 23, 2018, the Federal Hockey League (FHL) announced an expansion team Mentor, Ohio, which brought the FHL back to six teams after two teams from the previous season folded and the addition of another expansion team in Elmira, New York. Dan Moon and Chris Bryniarski, who were stated to be the team's owners, also revealed the team's name, the Mentor Ice Breakers, and inaugural schedule. The team also initially announced that Joe Pace Sr. had been hired as head coach, coming from the same position with the Port Huron Prowlers, however, by August 9 he had been replaced by Iain Duncan and Cary Ross was listed as the ownership's managing partner. The Ice Breakers finished with a 18–35–5, tied for last in the league in points, and failed to make the playoffs in their inaugural season.

Prior to the 2019–20 season, the league fully rebranded to Federal Prospects Hockey League (FPHL). Nick Russo took over as director of hockey operations in the offseason. The Ice Breakers started the season decently, going 12–12 by the end of 2019, but lost several players to trades and call-ups to the Southern Professional Hockey League. Head coach Duncan was then fired on February 22, 2020, following a ten-game losing streak and disagreeing with the management for trading away so many of his players. He was replaced by interim head coach Sebastian Ragno who was named the permanent replacement after the season ended.

The 2019–20 season was curtailed due to the COVID-19 pandemic. On November 16, 2020, the Ice Breakers announced it had permanently ceased operations due to the pandemic-related operating restrictions in Ohio.

== Season-by-season results ==
Season	GP	W	L	OTW	OTL	Pts (Note: The FHL awards 3 points for a regulation time win, 2 points for an overtime win, and 1 point for an overtime or shootout loss)	Pct	GF	GA	PIM	Finish	Playoffs
2018–19	58	17	35	1	5	58	.333	203	280	1595	5th of 6, FHL	Did not qualify
2019–20	48	15	30	0	3	48	.333	147	196	831	4th of 5, Eastern	Season cancelled due to COVID-19 pandemic
