= Continental Elite Hockey League =

- Sport: ice hockey
- Founded: 2001
- Folded: 2004
- No. of teams: 6
- Country: United States
- Last champion: Metro Fighting Moose
- Website: CEHL website

The Continental Elite Hockey League was a Junior A league that existed from 2001 to 2004. The league was an independent Junior ice hockey league that did not operate under USA Hockey. There were later plans for a new league to begin play in the 2012–2013 season as a Tier II Junior league. The new Continental Elite Hockey League planned to have five to six teams ready to play in the league's first season.

== League History ==
The Continental Elite Hockey League was a Junior A league that existed from 2001 – 2004. The league did not operate under the auspices of USA Hockey as all other significant Junior leagues in the United States do. This led many to refer to the CEHL as the "rebel league," which may have contributed to the quick decline.

Hockey Weekly and Michigan Hockey joined newspapers around Michigan and Ohio in announcing the formation of a controversial new independent Junior A-level hockey league for the 2001-02 season.

The Continental Elite Hockey League (CEHL) played three seasons without any affiliation with USA Hockey to create opportunities for 21-year-olds. Using many Canadians on rosters allowed the CEHL to create a strong league.

The CEHL championships were won by the Detroit Lightning, Toledo Jr. Storm and New Jersey's Metro Moose.

The Traverse City Enforcers had the best attendance in the CEHL all three seasons by playing to near capacity crowds every game under the leadership of long-time minor league sports owner Barry Soskin. The Tri-City Hurricanes/Bay County Blizzard had the CEHL's second-best crowds during the first season, but no other CEHL club was ever to do well at the gate with the Junior A level game.

The first CEHL Commissioner was Kevin Shanahan and he was replaced by Gord Young. The CEHL was founded by Shanahan of Fraser, Michigan; Bob Clouston of Troy, Michigan; Barry Soskin of Chicago, Illinois; Mike Killbreath of Grand Blanc, Michigan; Carl Voelker of Fraser, Michigan; Bill Cherfoli of Fraser, Michigan; and Jamie Graves of Fraser, Michigan.

Voelker, Graves and Cherfoli were the owners of the Detroit Lightning, and also Great Lakes Sports Arena in Fraser. Clouston was a long-time owner and General Manager of hockey clubs, including the Port Huron North Americans of Major League Roller Hockey and many Junior A ice hockey teams. Killbreath was a long-time newspaper executive and was also one of the co-founders of the Great Lakes League in roller hockey. He launched the Tri-City Hurricanes but sold them at mid-season to concentrate on establishing a CEHL team in Mount Pleasant, Michigan. Killbreath left the CEHL instead to launch a new low-level pro league known as the International Independent Hockey League (IIHL), which began play in 2003 but ceased operations in 2004.

After delaying the start of the 2004–2005 season by two weeks the CEHL officially suspended operations on October 3, 2004 for financial reasons. The league caused controversy due to preparing for the 2004–05 season by holding tryouts and charging players to participate without ever actually playing any games that season. The CEHL folded shortly after Soskin pulled the plug on his club. Soskin resurfaced as operator again in Toledo with the East Coast Hockey League (ECHL) club. Some of the former teams joined other junior hockey leagues while many other franchises folded.

== League Champions ==
- Toledo Jr. Storm (2001–02)
- Detroit Belle Tire Lightning (2002–03)
- Metro Fighting Moose (2003–2004).

== Former players ==
Using many Canadians on rosters allowed the CEHL to create a strong league. A long list of CEHL players moved on to the minor pro ranks. One ex-CEHL player, Steve MacIntyre was signed by the New York Rangers after two seasons as the most feared fighter in the United Hockey League (UHL). He was recruited to play for the Tri-City Hurricanes in Bay City, Michigan by Owner & General Manager Mike Killbreath and Head Coach Kurt Walson. The Tri-City Hurricanes later became the Bay County Blizzard after a mid-season sale of the team by original owner Mike Killbreath. MacIntyre led the CEHL in penalty minutes and received a lifetime ban late in the season for his part in a nasty brawl with the Detroit Lightning. Banned by the CEHL, MacIntyre signed with the Muskegon Fury of the UHL and he helped them win the UHL's Colonial Cup as playoff champions. He was eventually signed by the New York Rangers and after spending several seasons in the minor leagues, MacIntyre made the National Hockey League (NHL) in 2008, with the Edmonton Oilers.

== Teams ==
Many teams played within the league during its three seasons.

- Traverse City Enforcers
- Brownstown Bombers
- Detroit Belle Tire Lightning
- Michigan Stars
- Toledo Wolf Pack
- Bay County Blizzard
- Dayton Gems
- Youngstown Phantom Rockets
- Toledo Ice Diggers
- Jackson Prowlers
- Tri-City Hurricanes
- Metro Fighting Moose
- Toledo Storm
