= Steve Harrison (ice hockey) =

Canadian ice hockey player (born 1958)

- Born: 25 April 1958 (age 68) Scarborough, Ontario, Canada
- Height: 5 ft 11 in (180 cm)
- Weight: 190 lb (86 kg; 13 st 8 lb)
- Position: Defence
- Shot: Left
- Played for: Kalamazoo Wings; Port Huron Flags; Salt Lake Golden Eagles; Peoria Prancers; Moncton Alpines; Toledo Goaldiggers; TUTO Hockey; Flint Spirits; SaiPa; Brûleurs de Loups; Fort Worth Fire
- National team: France
- NHL draft: 39th overall, 1978; St Louis Blues
- Playing career: 1978–1993

Steve Harrison (born April 25, 1958) is a Canadian former professional ice hockey defenceman. He last played for the Fort Worth Fire of the Central Hockey League. He is currently the head coach for the Twin City Thunderbirds in the FPHL.

== Career ==
=== Early career ===
Harrison was drafted from the Toronto Marlboros by the St. Louis Blues, 39th overall, in the 1978 NHL Amateur Draft, but he never played in the NHL and spent the majority of his career with the Salt Lake Golden Eagles. He has also played in the SM-liiga.

=== Coaching ===
Before the 1993–94 CHL season, Harrison was named the head coach of the Fort Worth Fire. After the Fire finished with a combined record of 57-63-10 in 2 seasons, failing to qualify for the playoffs in both seasons, he was fired and replaced with Bill McDonald.

Harrison was appointed head coach of the Toledo Storm for the 2003–04 ECHL season but was replaced partway through the season by Nick Vitucci.

Harrison was appointed head coach of the Danville Dashers for the 2014–15 FHL season. The team secured the championship title in 2017, but Harrison stepped down from his coaching position soon after.

Harrison also served as head coach of the New Mexico Renegades in their last season based in New Mexico and held a scouting role with the San Jose Sharks.

In the summer of 2023, Harrison was appointed head coach of the Carolina Thunderbirds of the FPHL, located in Winston-Salem, North Carolina. Under his leadership, the Thunderbirds finished second in the regular season standings of the FPHL's Continental Division.
