= Professional Box Lacrosse Association =

Minor professional indoor lacrosse league

- Sport: Lacrosse
- Founded: 2021; 5 years ago
- Folded: 2023
- CEO: Brad Bryant
- COO: Brian Mankameyer
- Commissioner: Steve Donner
- No. of teams: 9
- Countries: United States

The Professional Box Lacrosse Association (PBLA) was a men's professional box lacrosse league in the United States. The league was announced on June 29, 2022, with the first seven (of nine) team locations announced on July 19. The league intended to focus on growing the sport in the United States, drawing players, coaches, and other personnel primarily from there.

Full league operations were suspended just weeks into their first season.

== Teams ==
The league started out with a single-ownership structure, with all teams being league-operated. Nine teams were planned for the inaugural season. Names for each team were nominated and voted on by fans from the host cities.

Team	City	Arena	Capacity	Founded
Binghamton Bombers	Binghamton, New York	Visions Veterans Memorial Arena	4,710	2022
Charlotte Bootleggers	Charlotte, North Carolina	Bojangles Coliseum	8,600	2022
Elmira Renegades	Elmira, New York	First Arena	3,784	2022
Hampton Hammerheads	Hampton, Virginia	Hampton Coliseum	10,147	2022
Jim Thorpe All-Americans	Jim Thorpe, Pennsylvania	PPL Center (Allentown)	8,500	2022
New England Chowderheads	Portland, Maine; Lowell, Massachusetts	Cross Insurance Arena; Tsongas Center	6,206; 6,003	2022
Salem Mayhem	Salem, Virginia	Salem Civic Center	6,820	2022
Syracuse Spark	Syracuse, New York	Upstate Medical University Arena	5,800	2022
Trenton Terror	Trenton, New Jersey	CURE Insurance Arena	7,605	2022

All teams whose names had been announced were decided by a name-the-team contest. The winners were announced on August 14, 2022. The Syracuse Spark were originally going to be called the "Sparkle Muffins" however due to the mouthful that this name would be it was shortened to Spark, the logo and mascot were still a spider.
