= Twin City Thunderbirds =

Professional ice hockey team in Winston-Salem, North Carolina

- City: Winston-Salem, North Carolina
- League: Federal Prospects Hockey League
- Conference: Eastern
- Division: Atlantic
- Founded: 2016
- Home arena: Winston-Salem Fairgrounds Arena
- Owners: Cary Ross and Lisa Ross
- Head coach: Jon Buttitta
- Website: www.twincitythunderbirds.com

Franchise history
- 2017–2025: Carolina Thunderbirds
- 2025–present: Twin City Thunderbirds

Championships
- Regular season titles: 2 (2018–19, 2019–20)
- Playoff championships: 1 (2018–19)

The Twin City Thunderbirds are a minor professional ice hockey team based in Winston-Salem, North Carolina. The team competes in the Federal Prospects Hockey League (FPHL) and plays its home games at the Winston-Salem Fairgrounds Arena. The franchise was founded in 2016 and began play in 2017 as the Carolina Thunderbirds.

As the Carolina Thunderbirds, the team won the Commissioner's Cup in 2019 and reached the Commissioner's Cup Finals in three consecutive seasons from 2022–23 through 2024–25. The franchise adopted its current name and logo in September 2025. The team maintains an affiliation agreement with the Wooster Bulls of the American Premier Hockey League, a senior ice hockey league.

== History ==
=== Formation and inaugural season ===
In August 2016, the Federal Hockey League (FHL) approved an expansion franchise for Winston-Salem beginning with the 2017–18 FHL season. The Carolina Thunderbirds name was announced the following month, reviving the identity of the professional team that had last played in Winston-Salem in 1992. In June 2017, former Berlin River Drivers head coach Andre Niec was hired as the franchise's inaugural head coach.

The Thunderbirds played their first game on October 27, 2017, against the Danville Dashers. Their home opener followed on November 3, when Carolina defeated the North Shore Knights 3–2 before a sold-out crowd. The team finished third in its inaugural season and set an FHL single-season attendance record by drawing 66,204 fans. Carolina then lost its semifinal series to the Watertown Wolves in two games; the deciding 3–2 double-overtime loss was, at the time, the longest game in league history.

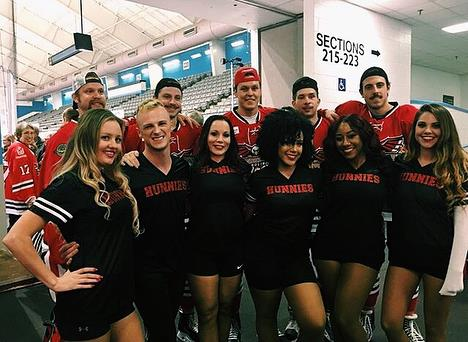
Carolina Thunderbirds players and cheerleaders during the team's inaugural season

=== 2018–19 championship season ===
Carolina completed a record-setting 2018–19 regular season with 49 total wins, 149 points, and an .856 points percentage, earning the first regular-season championship in franchise history. The season also included an FHL-record 24-game winning streak.

As the league's top seed, Carolina swept the Port Huron Prowlers in the semifinal before defeating the Elmira Enforcers three games to one in the Commissioner's Cup Finals. The Thunderbirds clinched their first league championship with a 4–3 overtime victory on April 27, 2019, as Jan Salak scored the winning goal 35 seconds into overtime.

=== Pandemic and coaching changes ===
The league, known as the Federal Hockey League through the 2018–19 season, adopted the Federal Prospects Hockey League (FPHL) name for 2019–20. Carolina led the overall standings when the FPHL canceled the remainder of the 2019–20 season because of the COVID-19 pandemic. The league later recognized Carolina as the 2019–20 regular-season champion. The pandemic also delayed the start of the 2020–21 season until February 2021. The Thunderbirds were one of four participating teams and played their entire schedule on the road.

Following the 2020–21 season, Niec left the Thunderbirds to become a European scout for the Florida Panthers. Garrett Rutledge was appointed as the franchise's second head coach and director of hockey operations.

=== Three consecutive Finals and rebranding ===
In Rutledge's second season, Carolina won the Continental Division playoff title and reached the 2023 Commissioner's Cup Finals, losing to the Danbury Hat Tricks in five games. Rutledge left after the season to become an assistant coach with the Saginaw Spirit, and Steve Harrison was appointed head coach later that month.

Under Harrison, the Thunderbirds returned to the Finals in both 2023–24 and 2024–25, losing both series to the Binghamton Black Bears in three-game sweeps. By reaching the 2025 Finals, Carolina had won three consecutive Continental Division playoff titles and advanced to three consecutive Commissioner's Cup Finals.

Barry Soskin's tenure as majority owner ended in June 2025, after which ownership partner Cary Ross assumed control of the franchise. On September 24, the organization adopted the Twin City Thunderbirds name and unveiled a new logo. The team remained in the FPHL and continued to play at the Winston-Salem Fairgrounds Arena.

=== Twin City era ===
In its first season under the Twin City name, the team finished fifth in the Continental Division and missed the playoffs, ending its run of three consecutive Finals appearances. Harrison was dismissed as head coach on April 17, 2026, and former team captain and player-assistant coach Jon Buttitta was appointed three days later. For the 2026–27 season, the FPHL placed Twin City in the Atlantic Division of its newly established Eastern Conference.

== Season-by-season results ==
Season	GP	W	L	OTW	OTL	Pts (Note: Through the 2025–26 season, the FPHL awarded three points for a regulation win, two points for an overtime or shootout win, and one point for an overtime or shootout loss. Beginning with the 2026–27 season, the league will use a 2–1–0 system: two points for any win, one point for an overtime or shootout loss, and no points for a regulation loss. W and OTW are listed separately in this table; some sources combine them as total wins.)	Pct	GF	GA	Finish	Playoffs	Head coach
2017–18	56	25	24	5	2	87	.518	197	192	3rd of 8	Lost semifinals, 0–2 (Watertown)	Andre Niec
2018–19	58	48	6	1	3	149	.856	266	116	1st of 6	Won semifinals, 2–0 (Port Huron); won Commissioner's Cup Finals, 3–1 (Elmira)	Andre Niec
2019–20	46	33	6	2	5	108	.783	219	106	1st of 5, Western; 1st of 10, overall	Playoffs not held; season curtailed by the COVID-19 pandemic	Andre Niec
2020–21	20	8	9	2	1	29	.483	75	61	3rd of 4	Did not qualify	Andre Niec
2021–22	62	25	26	6	5	92	.495	243	242	5th of 7	Won quarterfinals, 2–0 (Port Huron); lost semifinals, 0–2 (Watertown)	Garrett Rutledge
2022–23	56	33	12	7	4	117	.696	278	176	1st of 5, Continental; 2nd of 10, overall	Won quarterfinals, 2–0 (Port Huron); won semifinals, 2–1 (Columbus); lost Commissioner's Cup Finals, 2–3 (Danbury)	Garrett Rutledge
2023–24	56	32	12	8	4	116	.690	225	149	2nd of 6, Continental; 3rd of 11, overall	Won quarterfinals, 2–1 (Port Huron); won semifinals, 2–1 (Columbus); lost Commissioner's Cup Finals, 0–3 (Binghamton)	Steve Harrison
2024–25	56	38	11	3	4	124	.738	223	127	1st of 7, Continental; 2nd of 14, overall	Won quarterfinals, 2–0 (Blue Ridge); won semifinals, 2–1 (Columbus); lost Commissioner's Cup Finals, 0–3 (Binghamton)	Steve Harrison
2025–26	56	22	29	4	1	75	.446	193	207	5th of 7, Continental	Did not qualify	Steve Harrison

== Awards ==
Thunderbirds players and personnel have received the following annual league awards:

Award	Recipient	Season
Regular-season MVP	Josh Pietrantonio	2018–19
Regular-season MVP	Kalib "Gus" Ford	2022–23
Commissioner's Cup Playoffs MVP	Michael Bunn	2018–19
Forward of the Year	Josh Pietrantonio	2017–18
Forward of the Year	Josh Pietrantonio	2018–19
Forward of the Year	Kalib "Gus" Ford	2022–23
Forward of the Year	Lucas Rowe	2022–23
Forward of the Year	Kalib "Gus" Ford	2023–24
Defenseman of the Year	Mike Baker	2018–19
Defenseman of the Year	Jiri Pestuka	2022–23
Goaltender of the Year	Christian Pavlas	2018–19
Goaltender of the Year	Mario Cavaliere	2023–24
Coach of the Year	Andre Niec	2018–19
Coach of the Year	Garrett Rutledge	2022–23
Rookie of the Year	Lucas Rowe	2022–23
Executive of the Year	Scott Brand	2017–18
Executive of the Year	Barry Soskin (Carolina Thunderbirds, Danville Dashers, and Port Huron Prowlers)	2018–19
Founders Award	Cary Ross	2023–24
Broadcaster of the Year	Alec Kessler	2017–18
Broadcaster of the Year	Zakharia DeBeaussaert	2018–19

== Franchise records ==
The following regular-season franchise records are current through the end of the 2025–26 season.

Category	Player	Total
Games played	Jiri Pestuka	343
Goals	Kalib "Gus" Ford	189
Assists	Kalib "Gus" Ford	247
Points	Kalib "Gus" Ford	436

== Attendance ==
Average home attendance figures are from HockeyDB.

Season	Average home attendance
2017–18	2,207
2018–19	2,714
2019–20	2,831
2020–21	No home games
2021–22	2,403
2022–23	2,878
2023–24	2,939
2024–25	2,976
2025–26	2,435
