= Robbie Nichols (ice hockey) =

Canadian ice hockey player and coach

- Born: August 4, 1964 (age 61) Hamilton, Ontario, Canada
- Height: 5 ft 11 in (180 cm)
- Weight: 170 lb (77 kg; 12 st 2 lb)
- Position: Right wing
- Shot: Left
- Played for: Kalamazoo Wings; Fredericton Express; Adirondack Red Wings; Phoenix Roadrunners; San Diego Gulls
- NHL draft: 181st overall, 1983; Philadelphia Flyers
- Playing career: 1985–1998; 2019

Robbie S. Nichols (born August 4, 1964) is a Canadian former professional ice hockey player who competed in the American Hockey League (AHL) and International Hockey League (IHL). He currently serves as the head coach of the Topeka Scarecrows in the Federal Prospects Hockey League (FPHL) and is also a co-owner of three collegiate summer baseball teams, the Elmira Pioneers, Niagara Falls Americans, and Batavia Muckdogs, in the Perfect Game Collegiate Baseball League.

== Career ==
Nichols was chosen by the Philadelphia Flyers in the ninth round of the 1983 NHL entry draft. Although he never appeared in an NHL game, he went on to have a productive playing career that spanned nine seasons in the AHL and IHL. Known for his gritty and hard-nosed style of play, Nichols suited up for several teams, including the Adirondack Red Wings, the AHL affiliate of the Detroit Red Wings. One of the highlights of his career came in 1989 when he helped lead the Adirondack Red Wings to a Calder Cup championship.

After retiring as a player, Nichols transitioned into coaching, spending seven seasons as head coach of the Flint Generals. He also served as general manager of the ECHL's Elmira Jackals from 2007 to 2013. Nichols went on to own the Elmira Enforcers of the Federal Hockey League and is currently a co-owner of three collegiate summer baseball teams in the Perfect Game Collegiate Baseball League: the Elmira Pioneers, Niagara Falls Americans, and Batavia Muckdogs. In 2019, at age 55, he made a rare appearance as an emergency player for the Enforcers. The team ceased operations after the 2020–21 season. On May 5, 2025, Nichols was named head coach of the FPHL's Topeka Scarecrows.

== Career statistics ==
			Regular season					Playoffs
Season	Team	League	GP	G	A	Pts	PIM	GP	G	A	Pts	PIM
1982–83	Dixie Beehives	OJHL	14	11	22	33	60	—	—	—	—	—
1982–83	Kitchener Rangers	OHL	54	17	26	43	208	11	2	6	8	58
1983–84	Kitchener Rangers	OHL	12	5	8	13	46	—	—	—	—	—
1983–84	North Bay Centennials	OHL	46	36	32	68	98	4	1	4	5	11
1984–85	North Bay Centennials	OHL	41	27	39	66	72	8	10	13	23	14
1984–85	Kalamazoo Wings	IHL	8	2	1	3	0	—	—	—	—	—
1984–85	Fredericton Express	AHL	1	0	0	0	2	—	—	—	—	—
1985–86	Kalamazoo Wings	IHL	73	38	41	79	406	5	4	1	5	28
1986–87	Kalamazoo Wings	IHL	71	29	27	56	357	—	—	—	—	—
1987–88	Adirondack Red Wings	AHL	65	21	16	37	256	9	1	5	6	38
1988–89	Adirondack Red Wings	AHL	56	8	7	15	154	11	0	3	3	30
1989–90	Phoenix Roadrunners	IHL	69	25	25	50	265	—	—	—	—	—
1990–91	San Diego Gulls	IHL	50	5	7	12	216	—	—	—	—	—
1991–92	San Diego Gulls	IHL	77	30	35	65	228	4	1	1	2	8
1992–93	San Diego Gulls	IHL	72	18	32	50	261	10	2	5	7	34
1994–95	Detroit Falcons	CoHL	1	0	1	1	0	—	—	—	—	—
1997–98	Flint Generals	UHL	—	—	—	—	—	1	0	0	0	12
2019–20	Elmira Enforcers	FPHL	1	0	0	0	2	—	—	—	—	—
IHL totals			420	147	168	315	1733	19	7	7	14	70
AHL totals			122	29	23	52	412	20	1	8	9	68

== Awards and honours ==
Award	Year	Ref
IHL Man of the Year	1992–93	
UHL Coach of the Year	1996–97	
