= 1974–75 OMJHL season =

Canadian junior hockey season

The 1974–75 OMJHL season was the first season of the Ontario Major Junior Hockey League. The league operated semi-autonomously while still being part of the Ontario Hockey Association. The OMJHL inaugurated the William Hanley Trophy, awarded to the most sportsmanlike player. Eleven teams each played 70 games. The Toronto Marlboros won the J. Ross Robertson Cup, defeating the Hamilton Fincups.

== League business ==
The Major Junior A Series of the Ontario Hockey Association (OHA) was rebranded as the Ontario Major Junior Hockey League (OMJHL) in 1974. The league began operating semi-autonomously from the OHA, and later became fully independent. Tubby Schmalz was appointed the first commissioner of the OMJHL on September 23, 1974.

Schmalz set about to implement a revised mandatory player contract. It included a clause in which 20 per cent of a player's earnings during his first three professional seasons would go back to the junior clubs to recuperate development costs. He explained that the clause was a result of Mark Howe and Marty Howe both departing in the summer for the Houston Aeros, and there was nothing in the OHA junior contract to cover development payments by professional teams. The new clause was a basis for potential legal action against the World Hockey Association (WHA) which had not made payments to the Canadian Amateur Hockey Association (CAHA) or OHA.

Schmalz confirmed in January 1975, that development payments from the National Hockey League (NHL) were coming, and that the WHA was holding a meeting in February to discuss the issue. WCHL president Ed Chynoweth said his league's governors agreed to withdraw from the CAHA if the payment issue was not resolved, and foretold the possibility of Canada's three major junior leagues banding together under one umbrella. The NHL and WHA were delinquent in $600,000 in payments as per the existing professional-amateur agreement. The Winnipeg Free Press reported that the WCHL was negotiating a separate deal with the WHA for development fees, and the WCHL would break away from the CAHA after the 1975 Memorial Cup. Schmalz was angered at the report and called for the three major junior league to remain unified.

In February 1975, the NHL and the WHA agreed to stop drafting underage junior players. Mark Napier of the Toronto Marlboros who was not drafted, signed a professional contract with the Toronto Toros later that month to take effect in the following season. Schmalz stated he would seek legal advice on the matter, with the possibility of suspending Napier for the remainder of the junior season. During a game against the Marlboros, St. Catharines Black Hawks owner Hap Emms ordered his players to wear their jerseys backwards and play with their sticks upside down in protest of Napier's contract. Schmalz later ruled Napier eligible to play, and suspended Emms for the remainder of the season and fined him $1,000.

== Regular season ==
=== Standings ===
Rank	Team	GP	W	L	T	PTS	GF	GA
1	y-Toronto Marlboros	70	48	13	9	105	469	303
2	x-Peterborough Petes	70	37	20	13	87	311	254
3	x-Hamilton Fincups	70	37	24	9	83	337	271
4	x-Ottawa 67's	70	33	30	7	73	379	382
5	x-Sudbury Wolves	70	31	29	10	72	324	281
6	x-St. Catharines Black Hawks	70	30	33	7	67	284	300
7	x-Oshawa Generals	70	28	33	9	65	288	306
8	x-Kingston Canadians	70	25	35	10	60	297	345
9	London Knights	70	26	37	7	59	296	368
10	Sault Ste. Marie Greyhounds	70	25	36	9	59	312	367
11	Kitchener Rangers	70	17	47	6	40	239	351

=== Scoring leaders ===
Player	Team	GP	G	A	Pts	PIM
Bruce Boudreau	Toronto Marlboros	69	68	97	165	52
Tim Young	Ottawa 67's	70	56	107	163	127
Dennis Maruk	London Knights	65	66	79	145	53
John Tonelli	Toronto Marlboros	70	49	86	135	85
Doug Jarvis	Peterborough Petes	69	45	88	133	39
Mark Napier	Toronto Marlboros	61	66	64	130	106
Peter Lee	Ottawa 67's	70	68	58	126	82
Dale McCourt	Hamilton Fincups	69	52	74	126	57
Cary Farelli	Sault Ste. Marie Greyhounds	69	56	65	121	35
Paul Woods	Sault Ste. Marie Greyhounds	62	37	84	121	116

== Playoffs ==
League quarter-finals
1	Toronto	9
8	Kingston	7
4	Ottawa	6
5	Sudbury	8
2	Peterborough Petes	8
7	Oshawa	2
3	Hamilton	8
6	St. Catharines	0

League semi-finals
1	Toronto	9
5	Sudbury	7
2	Peterborough	4
3	Hamilton	8

League finals
1	Toronto	8
3	Hamilton	6

=== OMJHL quarter-finals ===
==== (1) Toronto Marlboros vs. (8) Kingston Canadians ====
March 26	Kingston Canadians	1 – 5	Toronto Marlboros	Maple Leaf Gardens

March 28	Toronto Marlboros	4 – 9	Kingston Canadians	Kingston Memorial Centre

March 30	Kingston Canadians	1 – 9	Toronto Marlboros	Maple Leaf Gardens

April 1	Toronto Marlboros	7 – 9	Kingston Canadians	Kingston Memorial Centre

April 2	Kingston Canadians	6 – 6	Toronto Marlboros	Maple Leaf Gardens

April 5	Toronto Marlboros	3 – 5	Kingston Canadians	Kingston Memorial Centre

April 6	Kingston Canadians	2 – 5	Toronto Marlboros	Maple Leaf Gardens

April 7	Toronto Marlboros	9 – 7	Kingston Canadians	Kingston Memorial Centre

Toronto wins series 9 – 7

==== (2) Peterborough Petes vs. (7) Oshawa Generals ====
March 25	Peterborough Petes	6 – 4	Oshawa Generals	Oshawa Civic Auditorium

March 27	Oshawa Generals	4 – 9	Peterborough Petes	Peterborough Memorial Centre

March 28	Peterborough Petes	4 – 4	Oshawa Generals	Oshawa Civic Auditorium

March 29	Oshawa Generals	2 – 2	Peterborough Petes	Peterborough Memorial Centre

April 1	Peterborough Petes	5 – 2	Oshawa Generals	Oshawa Civic Auditorium

Peterborough wins series 8 – 2

==== (3) Hamilton Fincups vs. (6) St. Catharines Black Hawks ====
March 25	St. Catharines Fincups	1 – 10	Hamilton Fincups	Hamilton Forum

March 29	Hamilton Fincups	8 – 2	St. Catharines Fincups	Garden City Arena

April 1	St. Catharines Fincups	1 – 3	Hamilton Fincups	Hamilton Forum

April 3	Hamilton Fincups	7 – 3	St. Catharines Fincups	Garden City Arena

Hamilton wins series 8 – 0

==== (4) Ottawa 67's vs. (5) Sudbury Wolves ====
March 25	Ottawa 67's	1 – 6	Sudbury Wolves	Sudbury Community Arena

March 27	Ottawa 67's	2 – 4	Sudbury Wolves	Sudbury Community Arena

March 28	Sudbury Wolves	7 – 5	Ottawa 67's	Ottawa Civic Centre

March 30	Sudbury Wolves	4 – 6	Ottawa 67's	Ottawa Civic Centre

April 1	Sudbury Wolves	4 – 5	Ottawa 67's	Ottawa Civic Centre

April 4	Ottawa 67's	4 – 4	Sudbury Wolves	Sudbury Community Arena

April 6	Sudbury Wolves	2 – 2	Ottawa 67's	Ottawa Civic Centre

Sudbury wins series 8 – 6

=== OMJHL semi-finals ===
==== (1) Toronto Marlboros vs. (5) Sudbury Wolves ====
April 8	Sudbury Wolves	1 – 8	Toronto Marlboros	Maple Leaf Gardens

April 11	Toronto Marlboros	4 – 6	Sudbury Wolves	Sudbury Community Arena

April 13	Sudbury Wolves	4 – 4	Toronto Marlboros	Maple Leaf Gardens

April 14	Toronto Marlboros	3 – 5	Sudbury Wolves	Sudbury Community Arena

April 15	Sudbury Wolves	6 – 8	Toronto Marlboros	Maple Leaf Gardens

April 16	Toronto Marlboros	1 – 5	Sudbury Wolves	Sudbury Community Arena

April 18	Sudbury Wolves	2 – 3	Toronto Marlboros	Maple Leaf Gardens

April 19	Toronto Marlboros	5 – 4	OT	Sudbury Wolves	Sudbury Community Arena

Toronto wins series 9 – 7

==== (2) Peterborough Petes vs. (3) Hamilton Fincups ====
April 8	Hamilton Fincups	5 – 2	Peterborough Petes	Peterborough Memorial Centre

April 10	Peterborough Petes	0 – 9	Hamilton Fincups	Hamilton Forum

April 12	Hamilton Fincups	0 – 5	Peterborough Petes	Peterborough Memorial Centre

April 13	Peterborough Petes	2 – 5	Hamilton Fincups	Hamilton Forum

April 15	Hamilton Fincups	2 – 4	Peterborough Petes	Peterborough Memorial Centre

April 16	Peterborough Petes	1 – 4	Hamilton Fincups	Hamilton Forum

Hamilton wins series 8 – 4

=== J. Ross Robertson Cup finals ===
==== (1) Toronto Marlboros vs. (3) Hamilton Fincups ====
April 20	Hamilton Fincups	5 – 6	Toronto Marlboros	Maple Leaf Gardens

April 22	Toronto Marlboros	7 – 4	Hamilton Fincups	Hamilton Forum

April 24	Hamilton Fincups	3 – 2	Toronto Marlboros	Maple Leaf Gardens

April 25	Toronto Marlboros	4 – 5	Hamilton Fincups	Hamilton Forum

April 27	Hamilton Fincups	3 – 5	Toronto Marlboros	Maple Leaf Gardens

April 29	Toronto Marlboros	3 – 7	Hamilton Fincups	Hamilton Forum

April 30	Hamilton Fincups	3 – 8	Toronto Marlboros	Maple Leaf Gardens

Toronto wins series 8 – 6

== Awards ==
J. Ross Robertson Cup:	Toronto Marlboros
Hamilton Spectator Trophy:	Toronto Marlboros
Red Tilson Trophy:	Dennis Maruk, London Knights
Eddie Powers Memorial Trophy:	Bruce Boudreau, Toronto Marlboros
Matt Leyden Trophy:	Bert Templeton, Hamilton Fincups
Jim Mahon Memorial Trophy:	Mark Napier, Toronto Marlboros
Max Kaminsky Trophy:	Mike O'Connell, Kingston Canadians
Dave Pinkney Trophy:	Greg Millen, Peterborough Petes
Emms Family Award:	Danny Shearer, Hamilton Fincups
William Hanley Trophy:	Doug Jarvis, Peterborough Petes

== See also ==
- List of OHA Junior A standings
- List of OHL seasons
- 1975 Memorial Cup
- 1975 NHL entry draft
- 1974 in sports
- 1975 in sports

Preceded by 1973–74 OHA season	OHL seasons	Succeeded by 1975–76 OMJHL season
