= Elmira Enforcers =

- City: Elmira, New York
- League: Federal Prospects Hockey League
- Founded: 2018
- Home arena: First Arena
- Owners: Robbie and Nellie Nichols
- General manager: Marc Witt
- Head coach: Ahmed Mahfouz
- Website: elmiraenforcers.com

Franchise history
- 2018–2021: Elmira Enforcers

The Elmira Enforcers were a minor professional ice hockey team located in Elmira, New York, and a member of the Federal Prospects Hockey League. Their home games were played at First Arena. The team folded in 2021 after an arena contract dispute after three seasons. The team made the playoffs in each of their 3 seasons.

== History ==
On July 17, 2018, Robbie Nichols announced he had acquired an expansion team in Elmira, New York, one year after the Elmira Jackals had ceased operations. On August 2, Nichols revealed the team name as the Enforcers and introduced the team's inaugural head coach as Brent Clarke, who had previously been the head coach of the Danville Dashers and Watertown Wolves.

The Enforcers played their first game October 26, 2018, and played their first six games on the road with a 2–4 record. On November 16, the team played their first home game and set a league record with 4,310 announced attendance, beating the previous record set by the Williamsport Outlaws in 2012 of 3,447. The team continued to set single-season FHL attendance records, but also saw its share of controversies. On December 17, 2018, several Enforcers were arrested after getting into a bar fight, sending a man to the hospital, although the charges would later be dropped. On March 10, 2019, owner Nichols assaulted a referee as the official was coming off the ice following the first period of a game against the Carolina Thunderbirds. The game was immediately cancelled by the officials, and subsequently led the FHL's officiating supervisor to resign and pull all referees from the FHL citing the need to protect his personnel. Nichols was issued the league-maximum fine of $25,000. The team, or someone using the Enforcers' name, posted a GoFundMe fundraiser for the fine, but was pulled down in about an hour.

The team continued its inaugural season and finished second overall at the end of the regular season. They swept the third place Watertown Wolves in two game to set up a championship series against Carolina. The Enforcers lost the first game in Carolina 7–3. Game two went to overtime and the game-winning goal was scored by landing on the back of the outstretched Enforcers' goaltender Troy Passingham and fell across the goal line when he went to get back up. The Enforcers heavily contested the call, with team-leading scorer Ahmed Mahfouz verbally confronting the officials and leading to a physical altercation between head coach Brent Clarke and a linesman. Mahfouz then broke his stick over the goalpost and tossed it over the glass into the stands before leaving the ice. Finally, goaltender Passingham was still disputing the goal with the official before leaving for the visitor's locker room, with the walkway passing directly next the fans, and a fan threw a filled cup at Passingham. Passingham then attacked the fan before they were eventually separated. Clarke, Mahfouz, and Passingham were all suspended by the league: Mahfouz for one game, Passingham for two, and Clarke for five games. The Enforcers then won the next game at home 7–2 with former Elmira Jackals' player Nick Niedert in goal, but lost the championship in an overtime loss in game four.

During the December 27, 2019, game against the Danbury Hat Tricks, due to a rash of injuries, owner Robbie Nichols was forced to suit up as an emergency player. He played two periods before sitting out the third due to exhaustion; Nichols, 55 years old at the time, had not played competitive hockey since 1998.

Following the COVID-19 pandemic curtailed 2019–20 season, head coach Clarke returned to the Watertown Wolves as coach. The Enforcers then named Ahmed Mahfouz as player/coach for the pandemic-delayed 2020–21 season. With the ongoing restrictions amidst the pandemic, the FPHL announced that Elmira and Watertown would be the only two teams to start the season on February 3, 2021. The two teams played three exhibition games at the end of January before heading to Watertown for the start of their Summit Series. However, the game was cancelled with the Wolves awarded a forfeit win due to a pregame altercation after an Elmira player attempted to enter the Wolves locker room, leading to the police being called to the arena. The altercation led to the entire 16-game February series between the two teams to be cancelled.

The 2020–21 season then began on February 19 consisting of Elmira and three other teams: the Carolina Thunderbirds, Columbus River Dragons, and Port Huron Prowlers, with Carolina playing all games on the road. The league announced an end-of-season tournament, but it would instead be called the Ignite Cup and not the Commissioner's Cup due to the unusual season format. The Ignite Cup consists of a five-game series between the top two teams that had played at least 16 regular season games. Elmira finished the regular season in second place, qualifying to face the top-seeded Columbus River Dragons in the Ignite Cup where they lost three-games-to-none.

In July 2021, the county took over operations of First Arena again when the county and Nichols' ownership group CAN-USA failed to reach a lease extension in time. The Enforcers were then forced to go dormant for the 2021–22 season citing lack of communication from the county.
