= Full House Resorts =

American casino developer and operator

Full House Resorts, Inc.
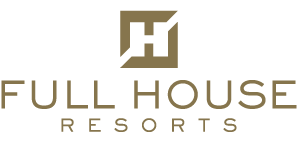
- Type: Public
- Traded as: Nasdaq: FLL; Russell Microcap Index component
- Industry: Gaming
- Founded: 1987; 39 years ago
- Headquarters: Summerlin South, Nevada
- Number of locations: 5 casinos
- Key people: Dan Lee (CEO); Allen Paulson (CEO, 1994-2000); Lee Iacocca (director, 1998-2013)
- Revenue: $125.6 million (2020)
- Operating income: $10.5 million (2020)
- Net income: $-0.1 million (2020)
- Number of employees: 924 full-time, 227 part-time
- Website: fullhouseresorts.com

Full House Resorts, Inc. is an American casino developer and operator based in Summerlin South, Nevada. The company currently operates five casinos. It is known for the involvement of Gulfstream Aerospace founder Allen Paulson, who was CEO from 1994 to 2000, and former Chrysler chairman Lee Iacocca, who was a major investor in the company from 1995 to 2013. Dan Lee has been CEO since late 2014.

== History ==
=== Founding (1987–1995) ===
The company was incorporated in 1987 as Hour Corp., and changed its name to D.H.Z. Capital Corp. later that year.

In 1992, the company changed its name to Full House Resorts and bought the Deadwood Gulch Resort, a hotel and casino in Deadwood, South Dakota. The resort was expanded in 1994 with an RV park and a family fun center, Gulches of Fun. By 1996, the company determined that Deadwood's remote location and low betting limits were too limiting, so the resort was put up for sale. It was sold it to a group of South Dakota businessmen in 1998 for $6 million.

Full House made its initial public offering on the NASDAQ Small Cap Market in 1993, raising $8 million.

Allen Paulson, founder of Gulfstream Aerospace, bought a 17.5 percent stake in the company in March 1994, and was named chairman and CEO in August.

The Coquille Indian Tribe chose Full House in 1994 from fifteen potential investors to develop a casino in North Bend, Oregon. Built in a former plywood mill, The Mill opened in May 1995. The company financed the construction in exchange for 26 percent of the profits through 2002.

=== Entry of Lee Iacocca (1995–1997) ===
In an effort to extend its base beyond the gaming industry, Full House was negotiating to purchase 21 acres of land in Branson, Missouri from a company owned by former Chrysler chairman Lee Iacocca, and Omega Properties, owned by John Fugazy and Full House director William McComas. During the talks, Full House learned that Iacocca and Omega were discussing four separate casino development projects with the Nottawaseppi Huron Band of Potawatomi, the Torres-Martinez Desert Cahuilla Indians, the Delaware State Fairgrounds, and four organized Indian tribes in Michigan. To gain access to these projects, Full House bought Iacocca's company and Omega in 1995. Iacocca received a 12.2 percent stake in the company.

With the four tribes in Michigan (Grand Traverse Band of Ottawa and Chippewa Indians, Lac Vieux Desert Band of Lake Superior Chippewa, Hannahville Indian Community, and Keweenaw Bay Indian Community), Full House proposed to build a $175 million casino in a vacated department store in Detroit. However, Governor John Engler decided in 1995 not to allow off-reservation Indian casinos, and Full House wrote the project off.

Full House worked with the Torres-Martinez tribe of southern California to lobby the federal government for more land, to replace the half of the tribe's reservation that was permanently flooded by the Salton Sea. By 2001, little progress had been made with the land, or with signing a compact with the state to allow a casino, so the tribe's members voted to terminate the contract with Full House. The company invoked arbitration and ultimately received a $1 million settlement from the tribe.

In December 1995, the firm entered into a partnership with lottery equipment manufacturer Gtech, under which all of Full House's existing and future projects, except for Deadwood Gulch, would be pursued as joint ventures. The alliance lasted until April 2001, when Full House bought out Gtech's interests for $1.8 million.

In May 1996, the Delaware project came to fruition with the opening of Midway Slots & Simulcast, a casino with 500 video lottery terminals and a racebook, at Harrington Raceway at the state fairgrounds in Harrington. Full House developed the casino at a cost of $11 million, and received a 15-year contract to operate it for a percentage of revenues. The firm's involvement ended when the agreement expired in 2011.

The proposed Nottawaseppi Huron casino in Battle Creek, Michigan was delayed by years of litigation by anti-gaming activists. The $375-million FireKeepers Casino finally opened in 2009, as a joint venture with real estate developer Robert Mathewson. Full House and Mathewson were to manage the casino for seven years, receiving 26% of net income, but the Nottawaseppi Huron bought out the agreement in 2012 for $97.5 million and took over management of the casino.

=== Gregg Giuffria & Hard Rock Biloxi (1997–2000) ===
In 1997, former rock musician Gregg Giuffria and casino architect Paul Steelman conceived the idea of building a Hard Rock hotel and dockside casino in Biloxi, Mississippi. Giuffria, a friend of Iacocca, approached McComas and Iacocca with the idea. After they negotiated an agreement with the Rank Group, owner of the Hard Rock trademark, Iacocca joined the Full House board of directors, and Giuffria was named president of the company in 1998. The project was organized as a joint venture between Full House and Paulson, with Paulson providing a boat, the former Treasure Bay casino barge. A seven-acre site next to the Beau Rivage casino was secured for the $250- to 300-million development. Giuffria resigned from Full House in 2000, but the company pressed forward with the Hard Rock. By 2002, though, financing had not been found, the options to purchase the land had lapsed, and Full House dropped the project. The Hard Rock Biloxi was ultimately opened in 2007 by a company co-owned by Giuffria.

At Giuffria's urging, the company moved its headquarters from Del Mar, California to Las Vegas in 1998.

=== Post-Allen Paulson (2000–2014) ===
After Paulson's death in 2000, Full House put itself up for sale. In July 2003, the Morongo Band of Mission Indians in California agreed to acquire the company for $20.1 million, but a tribal ballot to approve the purchase failed later that year, and the deal was canceled. Instead, Paulson's son, Michael, took over as chairman, and the company began a strategy of expansion.

In 2005, Full House reached development agreements with two tribes in New Mexico. The Manuelito Chapter of the Navajo Nation selected the company from eleven applicants to develop and manage a 50,000-square-foot (4,600 m^{2}) casino, four miles west of Gallup. With the Nambé Pueblo of New Mexico, the company agreed to develop a casino and hotel on tribal land fifteen miles north of Santa Fe, in exchange for thirty percent of net revenues for the first seven years. The Navajo project was dropped in 2007, when the tribe decided to proceed without a gaming developer. Market conditions, including the opening of a large casino by the nearby Pueblo of Pojoaque, led the Nambé to drop their arrangement in 2008, instead pursuing plans for a smaller gaming operation to be managed by the tribe itself.

Also in 2005, the company entered an agreement with the Northern Cheyenne Nation to develop a $10- to 15-million casino in Lame Deer, Montana. By 2010, financing difficulties forced Full House to write off the $728,000 it had spent, though it said it would continue to pursue the project.

In February 2007, the company bought Stockman's Casino, an 8,400-square-foot (780 m^{2}) casino in Fallon, Nevada, along with its 98-room Holiday Inn Express hotel, from James Peters for $25.5 million. It sold the hotel a year later for $7.2 million, deciding that it was not important for driving customers to the casino.

In 2011, Full House entered into a three-year management agreement with the Pueblo of Pojoaque to oversee its Buffalo Thunder and Cities of Gold casinos, for $100,000 a month plus success fees based on financial targets. The company earned $5.4 million under the contract before it expired in September 2014, and the tribe resumed self-management of the casinos.

Also in 2011, the company purchased two casinos from HGMI Gaming, a Hyatt affiliate owned by the Pritzker family. It bought the assets of the Grand Lodge Casino at the Hyatt Regency hotel in Incline Village, Nevada for $700,000, and leased the space for $125,000 a month for an initial five-year term, keeping all profits. It also bought the Grand Victoria riverboat casino and hotel in Rising Sun, Indiana for $43 million, and renamed it as the Rising Star Casino Resort.

In October 2012, Full House acquired the Silver Slipper Casino in Lakeshore, Mississippi for $70 million, with plans to potentially add a hotel. An analyst stated the company would likely continue acquiring properties with earnings in the $10− to 15-million range.

The company partnered in 2013 with the Keeneland Association in a plan to buy Thunder Ridge Raceway, a harness racing track in Prestonburg, Kentucky. The partners proposed to move the racing license to a new Quarter Horse track to be built in Corbin. The purchase was contingent on the formal legalization of slot machine-like Instant Racing devices, at least 300 of which would operate at the new track.

In March 2014, Full House agreed to acquire the Fitz Casino in Tunica Resorts, Mississippi from Majestic Star Casino for $62 million. Two months later, however, Full House said it would back out of the deal, citing financing difficulties.

=== Dan Lee era (2014–present) ===
In October 2014, a group of activist shareholders, led by former CEO of Pinnacle Entertainment Dan Lee, launched a proxy fight, accusing Full House's management of going on a "reckless buying binge". Lee soon drew the support of the Paulson family. The company responded by putting itself up for sale. The fight ended in a settlement in December 2014, with Lee appointed as CEO of Full House.

During the proxy contest, Full House was sidelined from the Thunder Ridge project, after the Kentucky Racing Commission expressed concerns about Full House and Keeneland decided to pursue the purchase alone.

In 2015, Full House proposed building a $650-million mixed-use project anchored by a casino, on a site near the Indianapolis International Airport. The proposal was rejected by the airport authority.

In May 2016, Full House purchased Bronco Billy's casino in Cripple Creek, Colorado for approximately $30 million.

The company revealed a proposal in August 2018 to build La Posada del Llano, a racetrack, casino, and hotel near Clovis, New Mexico.

In 2021, Full House began construction of Chamonix Casino Hotel, a $200-million property next to Bronco Billy's. The company also renewed its effort to expand in Indiana, submitting a bid to build a casino in Terre Haute, to be named American Place.

In June of 2026, Full House began construction on the permanent "American Place Casino" in Waukegan, a $302-million property. It will replace The Temporary that has operated since 2023.

== Properties ==
Full House operates seven properties and two of which are under construction:

Name	Location	Notes	Picture
American Place	Waukegan, Illinois	Construction began 2022; A temporary casino, to be named The Temporary by American Place, will open between October and December 2022.	
Bronco Billy's Casino and Hotel	Cripple Creek, Colorado	Acquired in May 2016 for $30 million.	
Chamonix Casino Resort	Cripple Creek, Colorado	Construction began 2021, next to Bronco Billy's.	
Grand Lodge Casino	Incline Village, Nevada	Acquired in 2011 for $700,000 from HGMI Gaming, a Hyatt affiliate owned by the Pritzker family.	
Rising Star Casino Resort	Rising Sun, Indiana	Formerly named the Grand Victoria Casino & Resort; Acquired in 2011 for $43 million.; 104 room hotel opened Dec. 2013.	
Silver Slipper Casino	Lakeshore, Mississippi	Acquired in October 2012 for $70 million.; 6 story hotel open in 2015.	
Stockman's Casino	Fallon, Nevada	Acquired in February 2007 for $25.5 million.	

=== Former properties ===
Casinos developed or previously operated by Full House include:

- Buffalo Thunder Casino — Santa Fe, New Mexico
- Cities of Gold Casino — Santa Fe, New Mexico
- Deadwood Gulch Resort — Deadwood, South Dakota
- FireKeepers Casino — Battle Creek, Michigan
- Midway Slots & Simulcast — Harrington, Delaware
- The Mill Casino & Hotel — North Bend, Oregon
- Stockman's Casino - Fallon, NV (As of April 2025)
