= Waveland, Mississippi =

City in Mississippi, US

- City
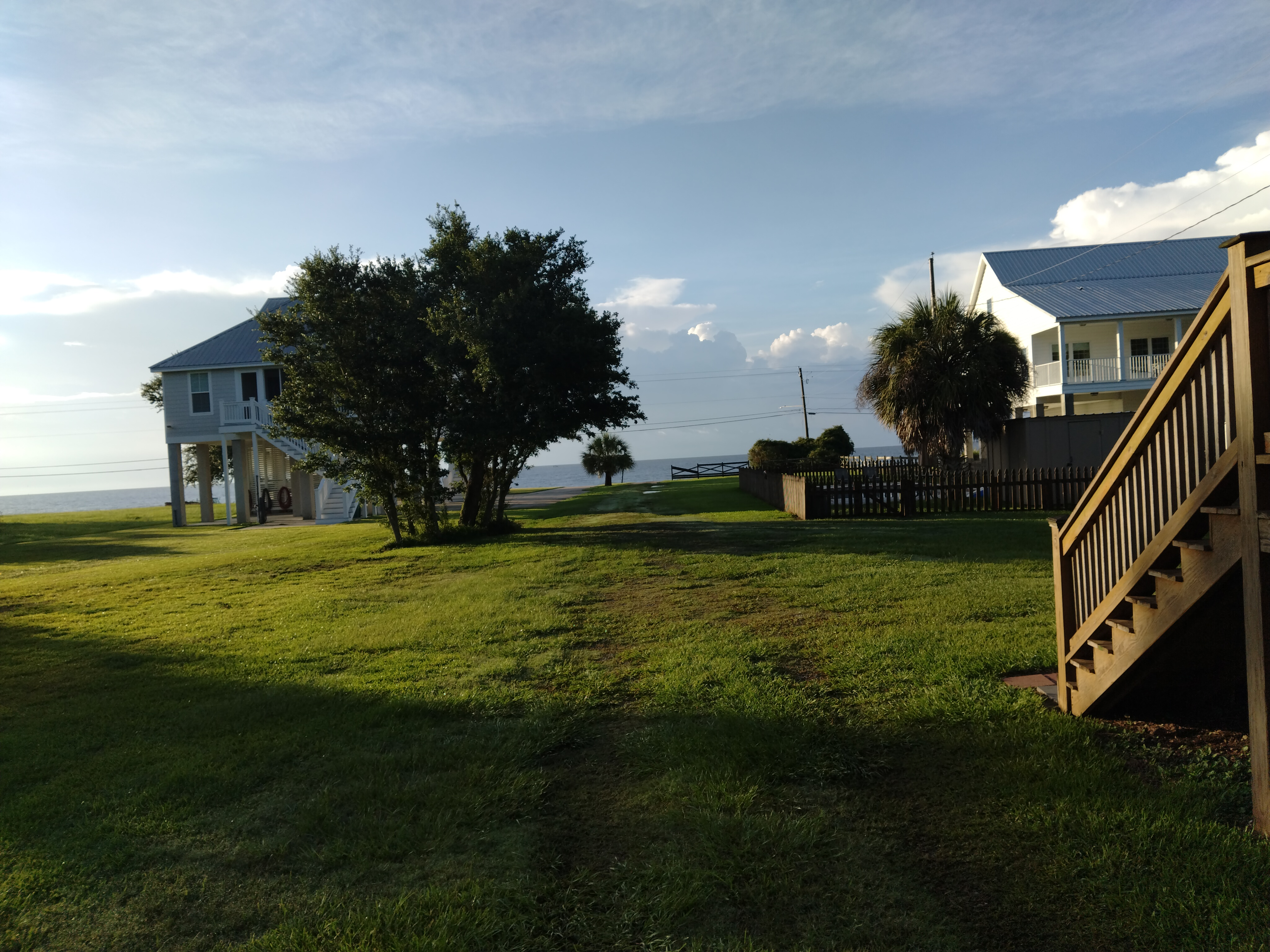

- Flag Seal Logo
- Motto: "America's Small Beach Town"
- Location of Waveland, Mississippi

- Location in the United States
- Coordinates: 30°17′36″N 89°22′42″W
- Country: United States
- State: Mississippi
- County: Hancock
- Established: 1972

Government
  - Mayor: Jay Trapani (R)

Area
  - Total: 8.63 sq mi (22.36 km^{2})
  - Land: 8.49 sq mi (21.99 km^{2})
  - Water: 0.14 sq mi (0.37 km^{2})
- Elevation: 20 ft (6.1 m)

Population (2020)
  - Total: 7,210
  - Density: 849/sq mi (327.9/km^{2})
- Time zone: UTC−6 (Central (CST))
  - Summer (DST): UTC−5 (CDT)
- ZIP code: 39576
- Area code: 228
- FIPS code: 28-78200
- GNIS feature ID: 2405691
- Website: waveland.ms.gov

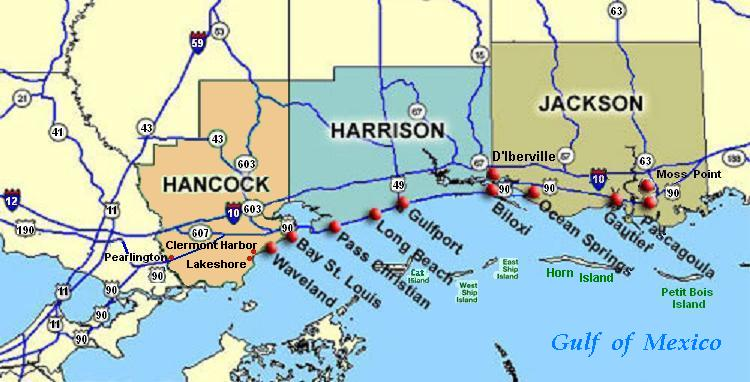
Waveland (left) is west of Bay St. Louis, on the Gulf of Mexico.

Waveland is a city located in Hancock County, Mississippi, United States, on the Gulf of Mexico. It is part of the Gulfport–Biloxi, Mississippi Metropolitan Statistical Area. The city of Waveland was incorporated in 1972. As of the 2020 census, Waveland had a population of 7,210. Waveland was nearly destroyed by Hurricane Camille on August 17, 1969, and by Hurricane Katrina on August 29, 2005.

== History ==
Andrew Jackson once lived and owned land in Waveland on what is now known as Jackson Ridge. Much of Jackson Ridge later became Buccaneer State Park.

The Silver Slipper Casino opened on November 9, 2006.

=== Hurricane Camille ===
On August 17, 1969, Hurricane Camille made landfall at the tip of Louisiana before continuing on shore at Waveland. The storm heavily damaged the areas south of the Louisville and Nashville Railroad. Recovery efforts went on for nearly a decade. The town later erected a plaque commemorating the efforts of the volunteers who committed time and resources towards rebuilding.

=== Hurricane Katrina ===
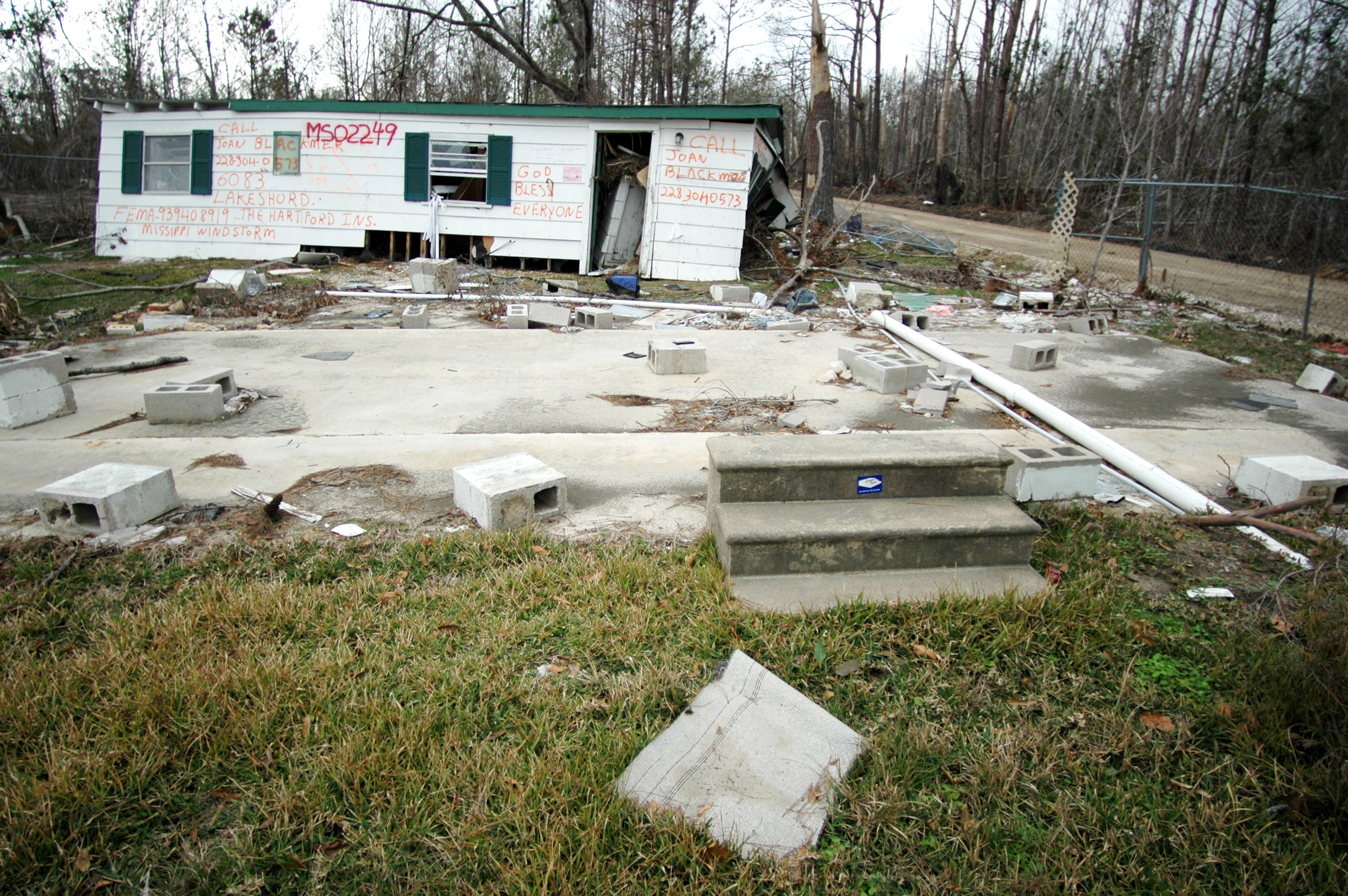
Destroyed mobile home in Waveland after Hurricane Katrina

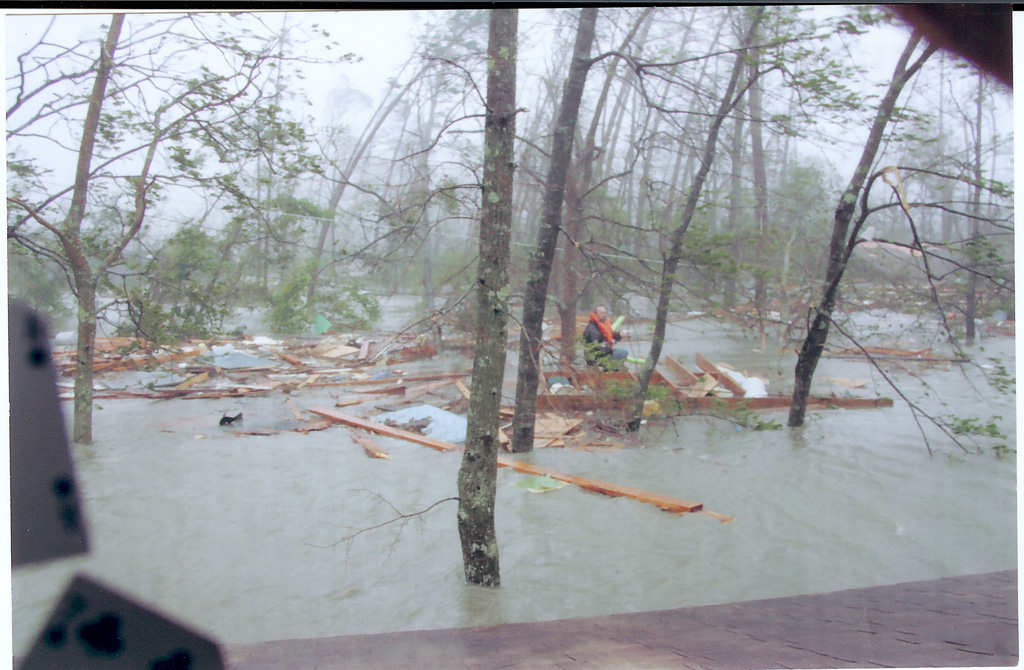
Waveland during Hurricane Katrina, August 29, 2005

The city of Waveland was "ground zero" of Hurricane Katrina's landfall on August 29, 2005. The city received massive damage and is still in the process of recovering and rebuilding. South of the CSXT mainline, the area was almost completely destroyed. The rest of the city took heavy flooding. In a news report, state officials said Waveland took a harder hit from the wind and water than any other town along the Gulf Coast, and that the town was obliterated. Official reports stated that approximately 50 people died when Waveland was hit directly by the eyewall of Katrina and the 26-foot (7.9 m) storm surge. Hurricane Katrina came ashore during the high tide of 8:01 am, +2.2 feet more.

Hurricane Katrina damaged over 40 Mississippi libraries, gutting the Waveland Public Library, as a total loss, requiring a complete rebuild.

The Ground Zero Hurricane Museum was opened in 2013 in what was the Waveland Civic and Cultural Center. Following Hurricane Katrina, the center was the only public building left standing in the city.

==== Recovery ====
A group of social activists seeking to better the lives of local residents, called the "Rainbow Family", arrived in Waveland soon after Hurricane Katrina. From early September to early December 2005, they ran the "New Waveland Cafe & Clinic" in the parking lot of Fred's Dept Store on Highway 90. The café provided free hot meals three times a day. The clinic was staffed by volunteer doctors and nurses from throughout the United States who saw over 5,000 patients during the duration, free of charge and dispensing free medications. Donations of medications and supplies came from a multitude of sources, with International Aid arranging the most donations.

Waveland Elementary School, which has served public school students in Grades K-3 (Grades 4-5 attend Second Street Elementary in nearby Bay St. Louis), was heavily damaged by Katrina. The students attending the school were educated in portable classrooms for the beginning of the 2006–2007 school year, pending a permanent solution.

The recovery of Waveland was due in part to the faith-based disaster recovery effort in and around the Waveland area. Shoreline Park Baptist Church in Waveland and Pastor Ed Murphy were vital to this effort, housing and feeding hundreds of missionaries from around the country for many years following Hurricane Katrina in what were referred to as "Pods for God". Shoreline Park Baptist Church directed the repair and, in some instances, the rebuilding of homes in the area for many years after the devastation.

After the storm, the similarly named town of Wayland, Massachusetts saw the town was neglected compared to the New Orleans area which received more media coverage, and decided to adopt the town of Waveland. They started an organization called Wayland to Waveland which sent a tractor trailer full of essential supplies, rebuilt homes, and restored local parks. Even though Hurricane Katrina was many years ago, the two towns still share a bond.

== Geography ==
Waveland is in southeastern Hancock County along the shore of Mississippi Sound, an embayment of the Gulf of Mexico. It is bordered to the north and northeast by the city of Bay St. Louis. U.S. Route 90 passes through the northern side of the city, leading east across the Bay of Saint Louis 18 miles (29 km) to Gulfport and west 55 miles (89 km) to New Orleans. Beach Boulevard (Mississippi Highway 606) passes along the shoreline, connecting Waveland with Buccaneer State Park and the communities of Lakeshore and Clermont Harbor.

According to the U.S. Census Bureau, Waveland has a total area of 8.6 square miles (22.4 km^{2}), of which 8.5 square miles (22.0 km^{2}) are land and 0.2 square miles (0.4 km^{2}), or 1.66%, are water.

== Demographics ==
Historical population
Census	Pop.	Note	%±
1890	328		—
1900	520		58.5%
1910	554		6.5%
1920	431		−22.2%
1930	663		53.8%
1940	768		15.8%
1950	793		3.3%
1960	1,106		39.5%
1970	3,108		181.0%
1980	4,186		34.7%
1990	5,369		28.3%
2000	6,674		24.3%
2010	6,435		−3.6%
2020	7,210		12.0%
U.S. Decennial Census

=== 2020 census ===
As of the 2020 census, there were 7,210 people, 3,034 households, and 1,683 families residing in the city. The median age was 40.4 years. 22.6% of residents were under the age of 18 and 17.1% of residents were 65 years of age or older. For every 100 females there were 89.0 males, and for every 100 females age 18 and over there were 85.1 males age 18 and over.

99.1% of residents lived in urban areas, while 0.9% lived in rural areas.

29.9% of households had children under the age of 18 living in them. Of all households, 36.7% were married-couple households, 19.3% were households with a male householder and no spouse or partner present, and 36.0% were households with a female householder and no spouse or partner present. About 31.8% of all households were made up of individuals and 13.8% had someone living alone who was 65 years of age or older.

There were 3,668 housing units, of which 17.3% were vacant. The homeowner vacancy rate was 2.1% and the rental vacancy rate was 15.6%.

Waveland racial composition as of 2020
Race	Num.	Perc.
White (non-Hispanic)	5,314	73.7%
Black or African American (non-Hispanic)	1,100	15.26%
Native American	35	0.49%
Asian	64	0.89%
Pacific Islander	4	0.06%
Other/Mixed	362	5.02%
Hispanic or Latino	331	4.59%

== Education ==
Most of Waveland is served by the Bay St. Louis-Waveland School District. Some portions are within the Hancock County School District.

All of Hancock County is in the service area of Pearl River Community College.

== Notable people ==
- Johnny Dodds, jazz clarinetist
- Michael Grimm, singer; winner of season 5 of America's Got Talent
- Arthur Putnam, sculptor
- Bob Thorpe, former Major League Baseball right fielder
