= Ice hockey in Delaware =

- Flag of Delaware
- Country: United States
- Governing body: USA Hockey
- National teams: Men's national team Women's national team
- First played: 2011

Club competitions
- List: FPHL (minor professional)

Delaware has virtually no organized ice hockey in the United States presence beyond the high school level.

== History ==
Delaware has yet to be the focus of any concerted effort by the ice hockey community. Internally, a dozen high schools play varsity hockey and have sent several players into the college ranks.

The first formal ice hockey team in the state never actually played in Delaware. The Delaware Federals were created in 2011 as an emergency replacement by the Federal Hockey League after the Vermont Wild folded just 10 games into the season. Because the team didn't have a home arena for games or practices, the entirety of their existence was spent on the road. The Federals played 13 games before the league abandoned the experiment and simply cancelled the rest of the Vermont/Delaware schedule.

The State remained without an organized team until the FHL returned in 2019. The Delaware Thunder began play that season and had their home venue, the Centre Ice Rink expanded to 700 seats for their arrival. While the team was able to survive the COVID-19 pandemic, the Thunder were not successful on the ice. In 2023, the team lost 28 consecutive games, setting a new record for professional teams in North America. After the season, the Delaware State Fair, which owned the Centre Ice Rink, didn't offer the team a new lease, forcing the franchise to look elsewhere. Because the Thunder could not find a home in time for the start of the following season, they temporarily withdrew from the league while they resolved their arena situation.

== Teams ==
=== Professional ===
==== Inactive ====
Team	City	League	Years active	Fate
Delaware Federals	None	FHL	2011–2012	Defunct
Delaware Thunder	Harrington	FPHL	2019–2023	Dormant

== Players ==
location of cities

Despite the state's proximity to Pennsylvania and New Jersey, both of whom have long histories with ice hockey, only one person from Delaware has yet achieved any notability in ice hockey. Mark Eaton was born and raised in Wilmington and even attended John Dickinson High School but he had to travel to Pennsylvania to play high school hockey as the level of competition in the state was insufficient.

=== Notable players by city ===
==== Wilmington ====
- Mark Eaton
