= Mississippi Highway 606 =

State Highway in Mississippi

Mississippi Highway 606
- Beach Boulevard

Route information
- Length: 11.801 mi (18.992 km)
- Existed: 1950–present

Major junctions
- West end: Silver Slipper Casino in Lakeshore
- US 90 in Bay St. Louis
- East end: Boat ramp in Bay St. Louis

Location
- Country: United States
- State: Mississippi
- Counties: Hancock

Highway system
- Mississippi State Highway System; Interstate; US; State
← MS 605	→ MS 607

Mississippi Highway 606 (MS 606) is the unsigned designation for the 11.8-mile-long (19.0 km) Beach Boulevard in Hancock County, Mississippi. It travels entirely along the coastline of the Mississippi Sound, which is part of the Gulf of Mexico.

== Route description ==
MS 606 and Beach Boulevard begin at a dead end in the parking lot of Silver Slipper Casino in the seaside community of Lakeshore, near the outlet of Bayou Caddy. According to the Mississippi Department of Transportation (MDOT), the formal southern terminus is further south where a parking lot formerly existed, but had since been removed for an expansion of the casino building. The road heads north along the immediate sandy shoreline of the Mississippi Sound, part of the Gulf of Mexico, to have an intersection with Lakeshore Road (which leads to the main part of the community, Bayside Park, and U.S. Route 90 or US 90) before curving northeast to leave Lakeshore and cross Sand Bayou to pass through the community of Clermont Harbor, where it crosses a couple more bayous (one of which is Grand Bayou) and travels through Buccaneer State Park. The highway now enters the Waveland city limits, traveling mostly through seaside neighborhoods as it has an intersection with Coleman Avenue (which connects Beach Boulevard/MS 606 to the city's tiny downtown area and the Waveland Ground Zero Hurricane Museum) and passes by the Waveland Veterans Memorial and the Garfield Ladner Pier. MS 606/Beach Boulevard have an intersection Nicholson Avenue (connects to US 90, MS 43, MS 603, and Interstate 10) before crossing into the neighboring city of Bay St. Louis. The highway travels through more neighborhoods, where it passes by the Washington Street Pier and Boat Launch, before passing through the downtown area, where it passes by the Bay St. Louis Municipal Boat Launch and the Jimmy Rutherford Fishing Pier, before MS 606 reaches intersection with US 90 at the mouth of the Bay of St. Louis. North Beach Boulevard and MS 606 continue around the west side of Bay St. Louis heading between a residential neighborhood and small private fishing piers and boat clubs. The road and MS 606 ends at the Cedar Point Boat Launch within view of Hollywood Casino Gulf Coast.

The entire length of MS 606, as well as Beach Boulevard, is a two-lane highway. No part of the road, despite being numbered a state highway, is maintained by MDOT.

== Major intersections ==
The entire route is in Hancock County.

Location	mi	km	Destinations	Notes
Lakeshore	0.000	0.000	Silver Slipper Casino Hotel	Western terminus, dead end
Lakeshore	0.543	0.874	Lakeshore Road to US 90 – Lakeshore	
Clermont Harbor	2.118	3.409	State Park Road – Buccaneer State Park	Access road into park
Waveland	5.622	9.048	Nicholson Avenue to US 90 / MS 43 / MS 603 / I-10 – Kiln	
Bay St. Louis	8.827– 8.839	14.206– 14.225	US 90 – New Orleans, Pearlington, Pass Christian, Gulfport	
Bay St. Louis	11.801	18.992	Cedar Point Boat Ramp	Dead end; eastern terminus
1.000 mi = 1.609 km; 1.000 km = 0.621 mi
