= Silver Slipper Casino =

Silver Slipper Casino is a name that has been used by several casinos including:

- Silver Slipper Casino (Las Vegas)
- Silver Slipper Casino (Waveland)
