= List of casinos in Delaware =

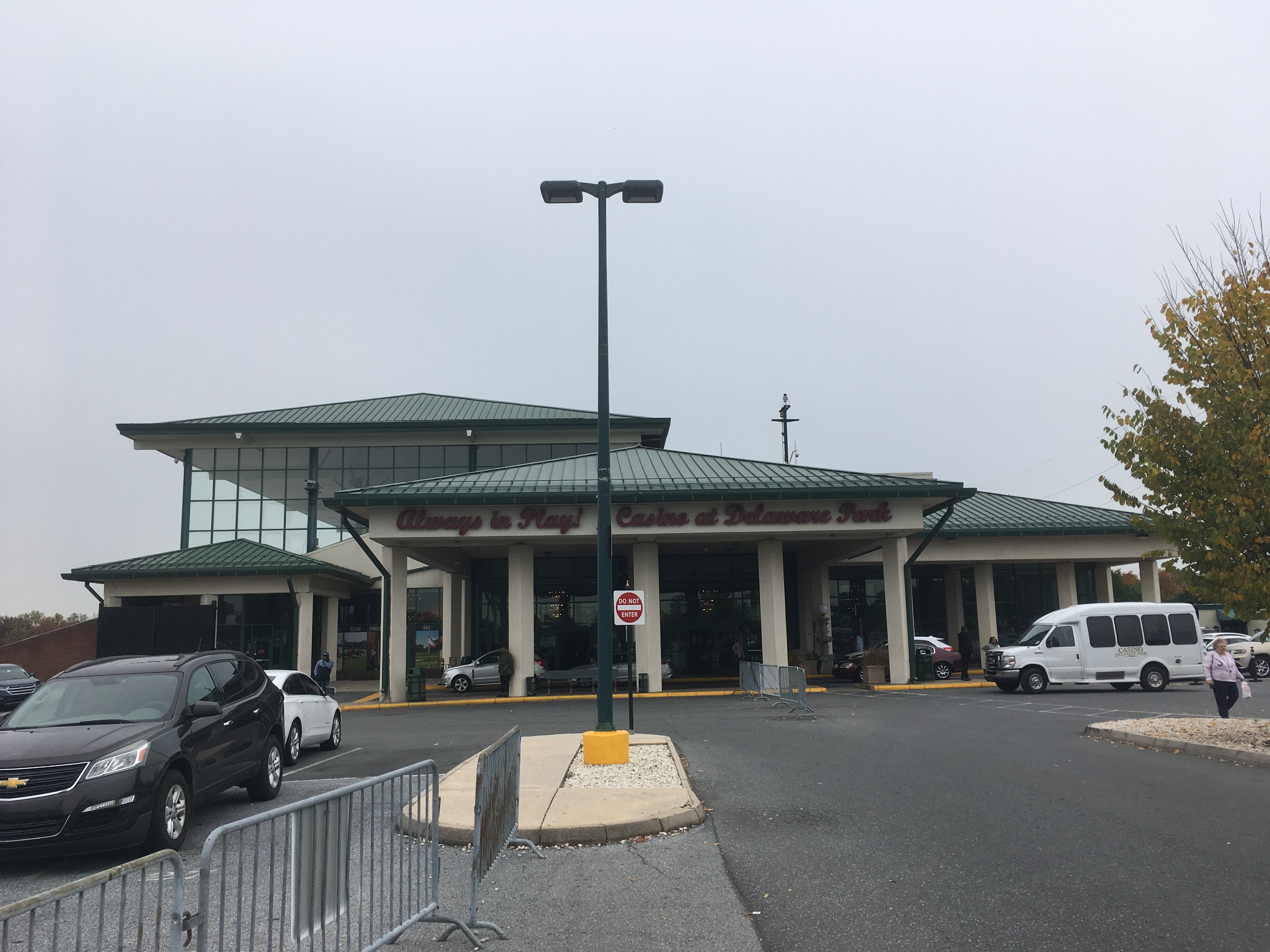
Casino at Delaware Park near Wilmington

This is a list of casinos in Delaware. Delaware is home to three casinos, all of which are racinos.

== List of casinos ==
List of casinos in the U.S. state of Delaware
Casino	City	County	State	District	Type	Comments
Bally's Dover Casino Resort	Dover	Kent	Delaware		Racino
Casino at Delaware Park	Newark	New Castle	Delaware		Racino
Harrington Raceway & Casino	Harrington	Kent	Delaware		Racino

== See also ==
- List of casino hotels
- List of casinos in the United States
