= Rieker =

Rieker may refer to:

- Rieker Shoes
- Rieker (surname)
