= Rieker (surname) =

Rieker is a surname. Notable people with the surname include:

- Albert Rieker (1889–1959), German-born American sculptor
- Manfred Rieker (born 1939), German photographer and photo designer
- Morten Rieker (born 1940), Norwegian sailor
- Rich Rieker (born 1961), American baseball umpire
