= Buccaneer State Park =

State park in Mississippi, United States

- Location within Mississippi
- Location: Waveland, Mississippi, United States
- Coordinates: 30°15′41″N 89°24′15″W
- Elevation: 10 ft (3.0 m)
- Administrator: Mississippi Department of Wildlife, Fisheries, and Parks
- Designation: Mississippi state park
- Website: Official website

Buccaneer State Park is a public recreation area in the U.S. state of Mississippi. The state park is located off U.S. Highway 90 and Beach Boulevard (Mississippi Highway 606), straddling the line between Waveland and Clermont Harbor. The park sits on the Gulf of Mexico and was entirely rebuilt after all its buildings were destroyed by Hurricane Katrina in 2005.

== Activities and amenities ==
The park features a 4.5-acre (1.8 ha) waterpark, 250 campsites, bathhouses, recreation center, 18-hole disc golf course, picnic area, playground, and 1.8-mile (2.9 km) nature trail.
