= Rising Star Casino Resort =

Casino and hotel in Indiana, US

Coordinates: 38.9525°N 84.8465°W

- Interactive map of Rising Star Casino Resort
- Location: Rising Sun, Indiana; 777 Rising Star Casino
- Opened: October 1996
- Gaming space: 40,000 sq ft (3,700 m^{2})
- Casino type: Riverboat
- Owner: Full House Resorts
- Previous names: Grand Victoria Casino & Resort
- Website: risingstarcasino.com

Rising Star Casino Resort (previously the Grand Victoria Casino & Resort) is a riverboat casino and hotel in Rising Sun, Indiana, US, owned and operated by Full House Resorts.

== History ==
The Indiana Gaming Commission in June 1995 selected a Hyatt-affiliated project in Rising Sun to receive a riverboat gaming license.

The Grand Victoria II casino opened in October 1996.

The Grand Victoria opened a 200-room hotel and an entertainment pavilion in July 1997, with a grand opening ceremony hosted by Robin Leach and Rich Little.

Hyatt decided in 2006 to sell the Grand Victoria. In 2011, Full House Resorts purchased the property for $43 million, and renamed it as the Rising Star Casino Resort.

A second hotel with 104 rooms, the $8-million North Star Tower, was opened at the site in December 2013.

In 2021 Rising Star partnered with WynnBET to launch a mobile betting platform, which partnered with the Cincinnati Reds to make team promotions available to users.

In February 2026, Indiana lawmakers passed a bill seeking to relocate the casino to a different county.

== See also ==
- List of casinos in Indiana
