= Bally's Dover =

Hotel, casino, and racetrack complex in Delaware, United States

Bally's Dover Casino Resort
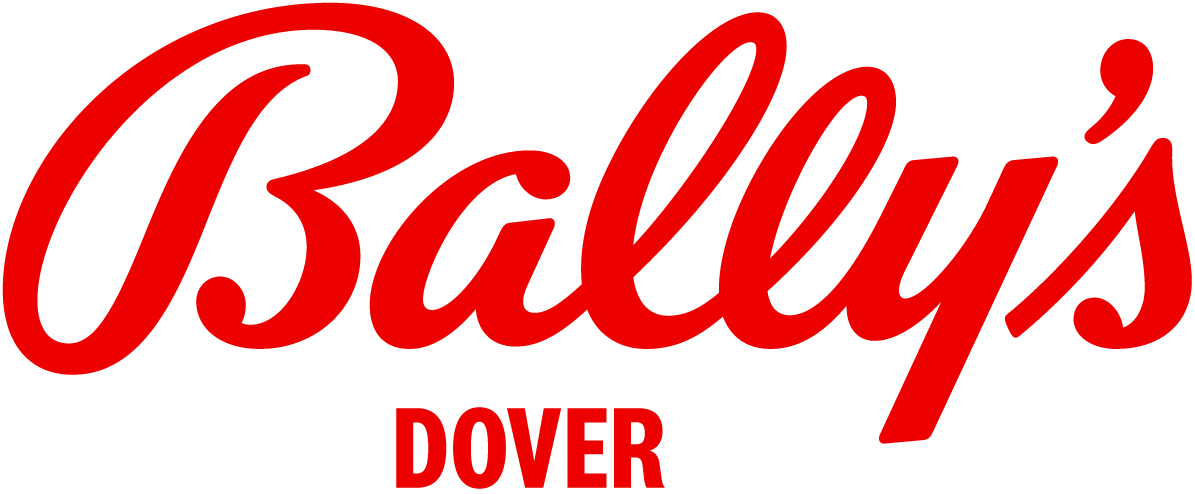

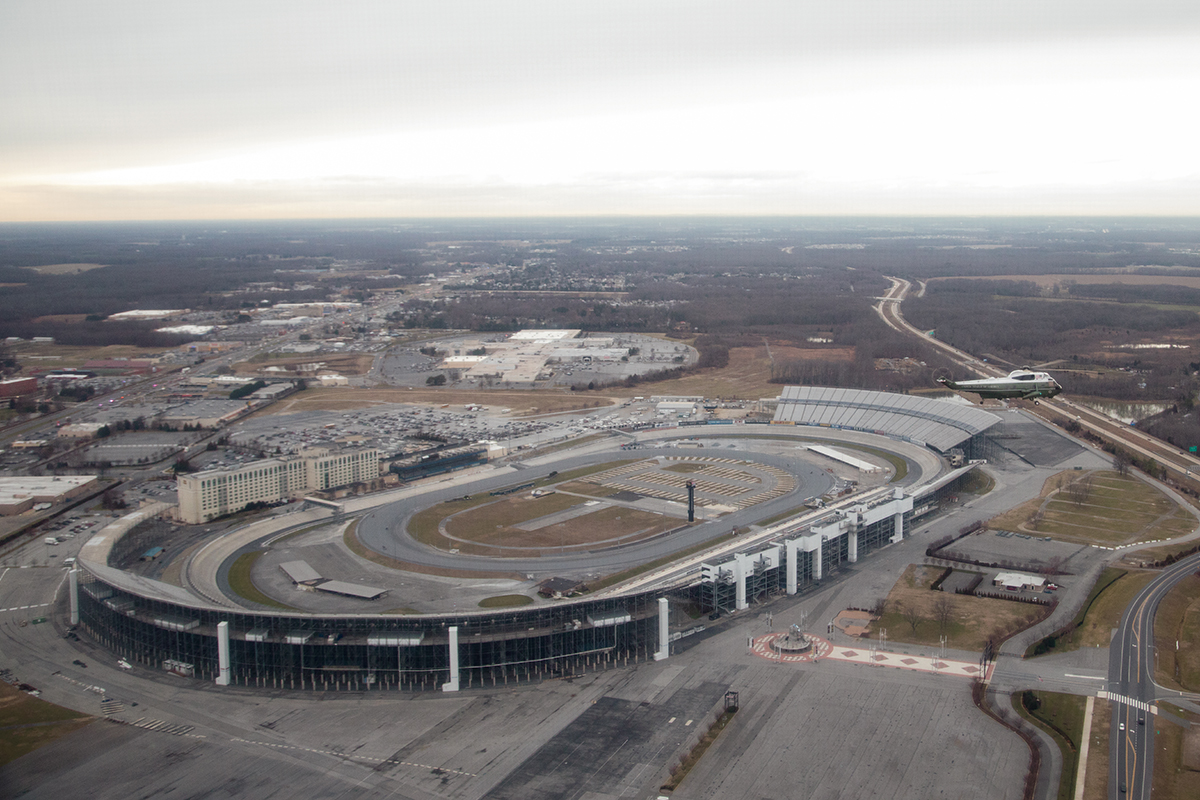
- Aerial view of Dover Downs in 2017. The horse track is located within Dover Motor Speedway and the hotel and casino is the large building to the left of the track.
- Interactive map of Bally's Dover Casino Resort
- Location: 1131 North Dupont Highway; Dover, Delaware
- Coordinates: 39.189201°N 75.532675°W
- Owned by: Gaming and Leisure Properties
- Operated by: Bally's Corporation
- Date opened: 1969 (racetrack); 1995 (casino)
- Race type: Harness racing

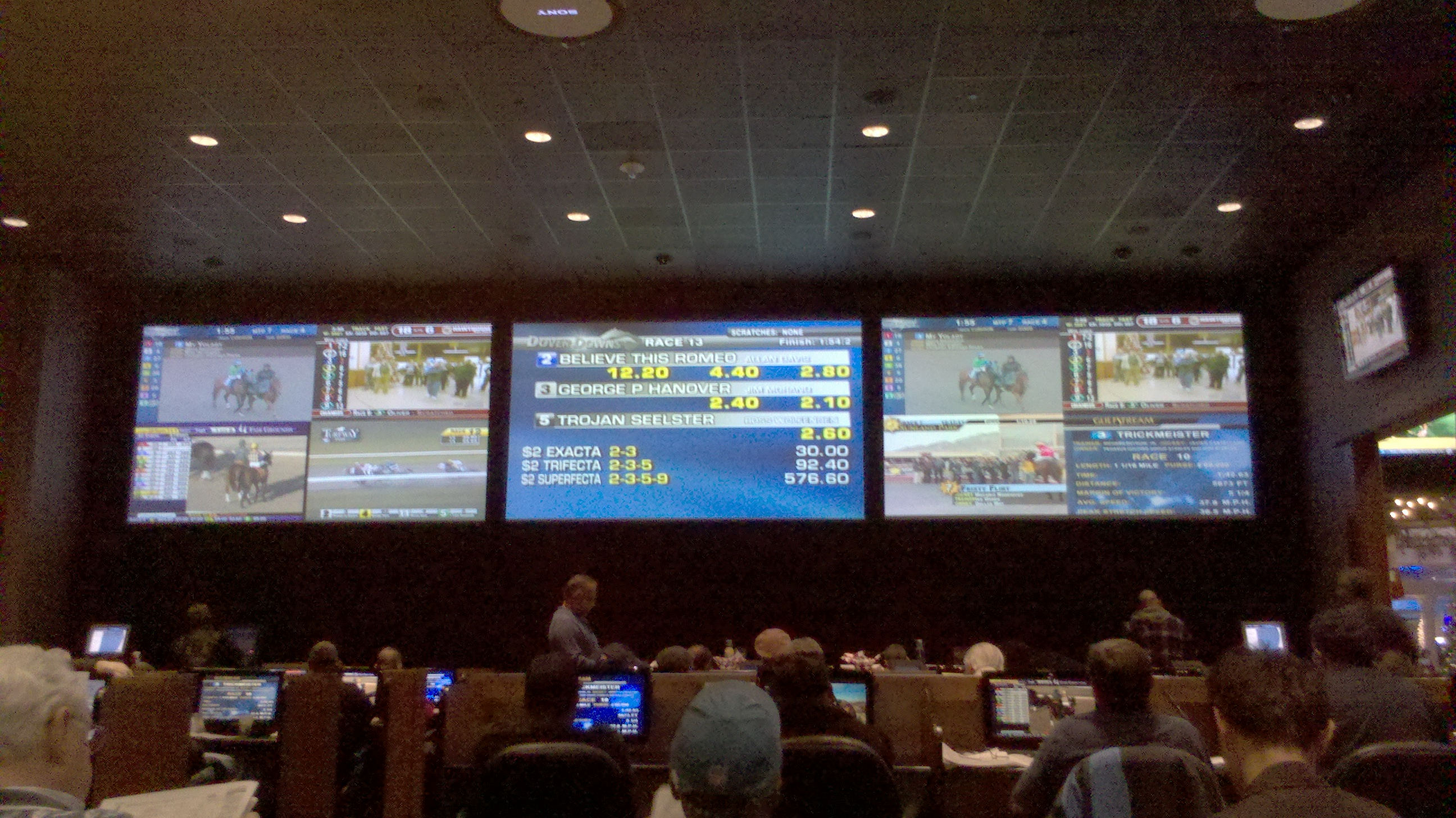
Dover Downs' Sports Lounge (2011)

Bally's Dover Casino Resort, formerly Dover Downs, is a hotel, casino, and racetrack complex in Dover, Delaware. It has a .625-mile (1.006 km) harness horse racing track, which is surrounded by Dover Motor Speedway, a 1-mile (1.6 km) concrete track used for NASCAR motor racing events. The complex is owned by Gaming and Leisure Properties and operated by Bally's Corporation, excluding the motor racing circuit, which is owned by Speedway Motorsports.

Primary features of Bally's Dover include a 500-room hotel, dining options, over 2,000 slot machines, 30 table games, a rotating bar, and the Rollins Center: an 18,000-square-foot (1,700 m^{2}) multipurpose ballroom which features entertainment as well as hosting business conferences, conventions and banquets. Steelman Partners were the original architects and interior designers when it was constructed in 1995.

== History ==
The horse track and the speedway opened together in 1969.

The track opened its casino, Dover Downs Slots, on December 29, 1995, following the enactment the previous year of a law allowing slot machines at Delaware's horse tracks. The casino was managed by Caesars World.

In 2002, Dover Downs Entertainment, the complex's parent company, spun off the horse track and casino as an independent company, Dover Downs Gaming & Entertainment. The former parent company changed its name to Dover Motorsports.

Dover Downs assumed management of its own casino in 2004, when the management agreement with Caesars expired.

A hotel expansion in autumn 2007 added 268 additional rooms, including 52 suites and 11 spa suites, for a total of 500 hotel rooms. This made Dover Downs the largest hotel in Delaware. Toppers Spa/Salon opened in the hotel on December 29, 2007.

A $56-million casino expansion was completed in 2008, adding 500 slot machines, a porte-cochere and atrium lobby, and an upscale shopping area called the Colonnade.

The casino added table games in 2010, when they were authorized by the state.

Dover Downs began a venture into the online gambling realm in late 2013.

In 2019, Dover Downs Gaming & Entertainment completed a reverse merger with Twin River Worldwide Holdings (later Bally's Corporation), a Rhode Island–based company with several casino and racetrack properties. Dover Downs shareholders were left with a 7 percent stake in the combined company.

In June 2021, Bally's sold the land and buildings of Dover Downs to Gaming and Leisure Properties for $144 million, and leased them back for $12 million per year.

The property was renamed as Bally's Dover in November 2021, as part of Twin River's rebranding to Bally's Corporation.

== Hotel ==
The hotel at Bally's offers upscale accommodations with rooms facing both the racetrack and the city. Amenities at the hotel include a full-service spa, fitness room, indoor swimming pool, room service, and concierge. Bally’s offers space for meetings, banquets, conferences, and conventions, including over 40,000 sq ft (3,700 m^{2}) of function space, the 18,000 sq ft (1,700 m^{2}) Rollins Center ballroom, several meeting rooms, and three hospitality suites offering views of the racetrack.

== Casino ==
The casino at Bally's offers over 2,000 slot machines and almost 30 gaming tables. Table games in the casino include craps, roulette, and card games such as blackjack, Spanish 21, baccarat, three card poker, pai gow poker, high card flush, heads up poker, and Mississippi stud. The poker room is currently closed, and no plans to reopen have been revealed.

== Racetrack ==
Bally's Dover offers live harness racing from November to mid-April and simulcasts of harness and thoroughbred racing year-round. The Race & Sports Book offers sports betting on live and simulcast horse racing along with single-game and parlay betting on professional and college sports (excluding Delaware college teams) including auto racing, baseball, basketball, boxing/MMA, football, golf, hockey, and soccer.

== Dining, entertainment, and shopping ==
Bally's offers various entertainment options including entertainers, comedians, concerts, and musical acts. Entertainers and musicians that have performed at the venue include Tracy Lawrence, Boyz II Men, Howie Mandel, Creedence Clearwater Revisited, and the Glenn Miller Orchestra.

Dining options at Bally's include upscale restaurants, casual establishments, a coffee shop, and a buffet. Bally's is also home to a variety of bars and nightclubs. Upscale shopping is offered at The Colonnade.

== See also ==
- List of casinos in Delaware
