= Delaware Thunder =

- City: Harrington, Delaware
- League: Federal Prospects Hockey League
- Division: Empire
- Founded: 2019
- Home arena: Centre Ice Rink
- Owner(s): Delaware Pro Hockey LLC
- General manager: Charles Pens Sr.
- Head coach: Lou Santini
- Website: DelawareThunder.com

Franchise history
- 2019–2023: Delaware Thunder

The Delaware Thunder were a professional ice hockey team in the Federal Prospects Hockey League and based in Delaware. From 2019 to 2023, the team played at the Centre Ice Rink in Harrington, Delaware, but are in the process of evaluating building and playing out of the Dover Civic Arena.

== History ==
The Delaware Thunder were announced as a member of the Federal Prospects Hockey League on May 29, 2019. The Thunder are owned by Delaware Pro Hockey LLC, an investment group led by Charlie Pens, who also serves as the president and general manager of the team. Former Danville Dasher Ryan Marker was the first signing in team history. They play out of the Centre Ice Rink on the Delaware State Fairgrounds. To accommodate the team's arrival, the rink's seating capacity was expanded to approximately 700 for the 2019–20 season.

In the 2022–23 season, the Delaware Thunder went on a professional hockey record 28-game losing streak ranging from November 5 to February 11 when the Thunder beat the Elmira Mammoth 5–2. The Thunder broke the streak previously held by the Battle Creek Rumble Bees, which was 24 games.

Following the 2022–23 season, the Thunder did not get a new lease from the Delaware State Fair and announced plans for a potential new arena in Dover leaving the Thunder to decide between dormancy until an arena could be built or relocating temporarily. On June 19, 2023, the Thunder announced that they would be electing dormancy for the 2023–24 season. In June 2024, during the league meetings, the Thunder were kicked out of the FPHL after not paying dormant fees.
