= Harrington Raceway & Casino =

Racing track in Harrington, Delaware, US

Coordinates: 38.915°N 75.575°W

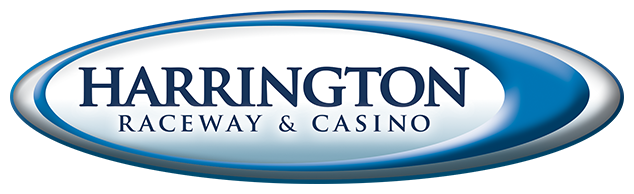

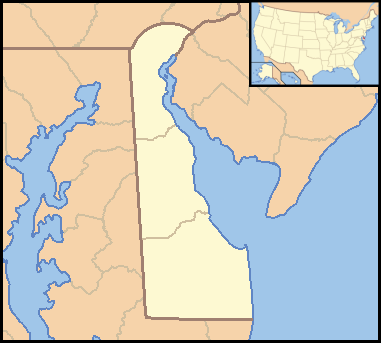
- Harrington Raceway & Casino in Delaware
- Location: Kent County, Delaware, United States; 18500 South DuPont Highway
- Opened: 1946 (racetrack); 1996 (casino)
- Casino type: Racino
- Owner: Harrington Raceway, Inc.
- Previous names: Midway Slots at Harrington Raceway
- Renovated in: 2010 (addition of table games)
- Website: harringtonraceway.com

Harrington Raceway & Casino is a harness racing track and casino (a "racino") located on the fairgrounds of the Delaware State Fair, just south of Harrington, Delaware, 16 miles (26 km) south of Dover. The casino, formerly known as Midway Slots, has over 1,800 slot machines, table games, simulcasting, and sports betting. In addition, the venue promotes and hosts concerts and other similar entertainment revues. Multiple dining options including a buffet are available as well. As of 2/17/26, the buffet has been closed post covid.

The racino is owned and operated by Harrington Raceway, Inc., which is majority-owned by the Delaware State Fair, a non-profit organization.

== Racing ==
Harrington Raceway runs approximately 70 days of live racing per year, split between a spring meet and an autumn meet. Races are generally held Monday through Wednesday evenings.

In between the spring and autumn meets, the track holds one day of racing on Governor's Day during the Delaware State Fair each summer. The program, which showcases the best Delaware-bred horses, is one of the most popular days at the track and has the largest purses of the year.

The track is a half-mile oval.

== History ==
The track was built for the first Kent and Sussex County Fair, which was held in 1920. Harness racing and other types of races were conducted annually as part of the fair (which changed its name to the Delaware State Fair in 1962). In 1934, the fair became part of the Central Fair Circuit, an organization to coordinate harness racing dates at fairs in the Mid-Atlantic region.

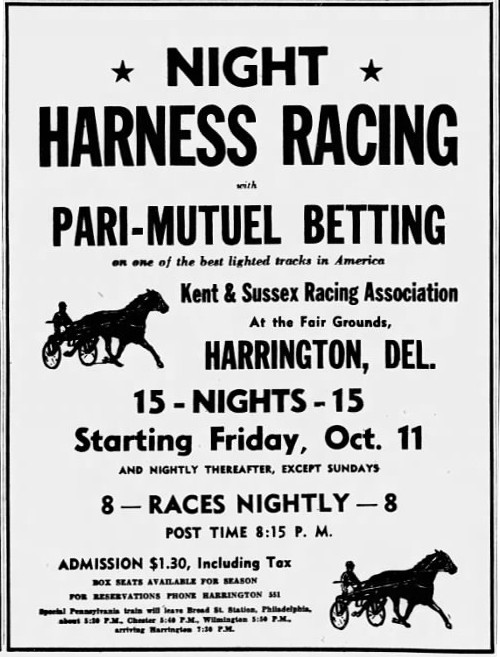
Newspaper advertisement for the first racing meet with parimutuel wagering at the racetrack in 1946

After the state legalized parimutuel wagering on harness racing in 1945, the directors of the fair organized the Kent and Sussex Racing Association to conduct an annual racing meet. The association opened its first 15-day meet with parimutuel betting on October 14, 1946.

In 1964, the racing association began considering plans to modernize or rebuild the facility, because it had been designed for the warm summer months, when the fair was held, and could not keep spectators comfortable during the colder autumn months, when the racing meet was held. Plans were formalized in 1966 to construct a new track to the south of the existing facility. Those plans were soon canceled, however, because of the high cost. Instead, a $1-million project was undertaken to build an enclosed clubhouse and make enhancements to the grandstand, including improved heating. A public offering of stock was issued to fund the project. With the improvements underway, the track's name was changed in 1967 from the Kent and Sussex Raceway to Harrington Raceway, although this name had already been in common use informally. Construction was completed in time for the opening of the 1968 racing session.

Attendance and betting at Harrington dwindled steadily starting in the 1970s, as part of the overall decline of the horse racing industry. By the early 1990s, the track was losing money and was in danger of closing. The introduction in 1991 of inter-track simulcast wagering boosted business somewhat, but not enough to make the track profitable.

In 1994, Delaware legalized slot machines at horse tracks in an effort to save the racing industry. Initially, Harrington was not expected to install slot machines, although some discussions had been held with Lee Iacocca about developing a slot facility. Many of the fair's directors considered slots to be incompatible with the fairgrounds' family-friendly environment, and Harrington was entitled to a share of the slot revenues from Delaware's other racetracks if it did not offer slots. In March 1995, however, the fair board of directors voted by a margin of 33 to 32 to build a slot parlor. The facility would be financed and developed by Full House Resorts, which Iacocca had joined as a director. Gtech Corporation soon joined Full House as a joint venture partner in the development.

Harrington's slot machine parlor, Midway Slots and Racebook, opened on August 20, 1996. The $10-million facility had 35,000 square feet (3,300 m^{2}) of space with 500 slot machines, a simulcast wagering parlor, and a buffet restaurant. The Full House/Gtech joint venture had a 15-year agreement to manage the facility.

The track itself was renovated in 2003 to widen it and to make the turns gentler, making the track safer and more attractive to horsemen.

Harrington Raceway bought Gtech's stake in the slot parlor joint venture in 2004 for $12 million. In 2006, a $50-million expansion and renovation of the slot parlor was begun. As part of the project, the Midway Slots name was dropped in 2007 and the entire property became known as Harrington Raceway & Casino. Also, Full House ceded day-to-day operations of the gaming facility to Harrington. The expansion was completed in 2008, adding a new restaurant, lounge, coffee shop, high-stakes gaming areas, and an expanded buffet, and increasing the number of slot machines in the casino from approximately 1,600 to 2,100.

Table games were added in 2010, following their legalization earlier in the year. The management agreement expired in 2011, leaving Harrington Raceway in full control of the casino.

On December 27, 2022, the racino closed indefinitely due to technical difficulties; it reopened on December 31, 2022.

== See also ==
- List of casinos in Delaware
