= Clermont Harbor, Mississippi =

Unincorporated community in Mississippi, US

- Unincorporated community
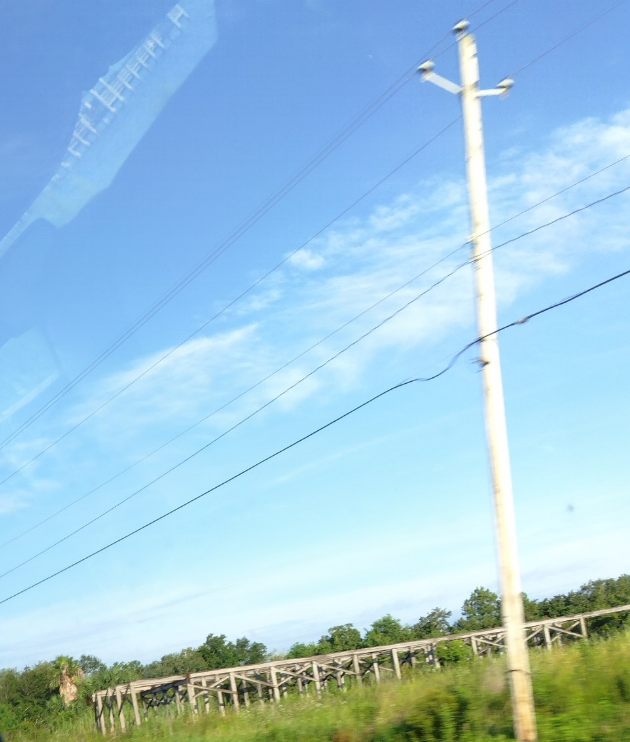

- Location within the state of Mississippi Clermont Harbor, Mississippi (the United States)
- Coordinates: 30°15′42″N 89°24′58″W
- Country: United States
- State: Mississippi
- County: Hancock
- Elevation: 9.8 ft (3 m)
- Time zone: UTC-6 (Central (CST))
  - Summer (DST): UTC-5 (CDT)
- GNIS feature ID: 668599

Clermont Harbor is an unincorporated community on the western end of Hancock County on the Gulf Coast of Mississippi. It is part of the Gulfport–Biloxi, Mississippi Metropolitan Statistical Area.

Clermont Harbor is located directly on the coastline, with the main road in and out of town being Beach Boulevard (unsigned Mississippi Highway 606). Buccaneer State Park lies on the eastern boundary of the community. The community lies along the CSX Transportation line. A post office operated under the name Clermont Harbor from 1913 to 1989. Clermont Harbor was completely destroyed by Hurricane Katrina on August 29, 2005.

The 40-room Clermont Harbor Hotel operated in Clermont Harbor from 1915 to 1946.

== Notable people ==
- Lori K. Gordon, artist
- Albert Rieker, sculptor
