= Manfred Rieker =

German photographer

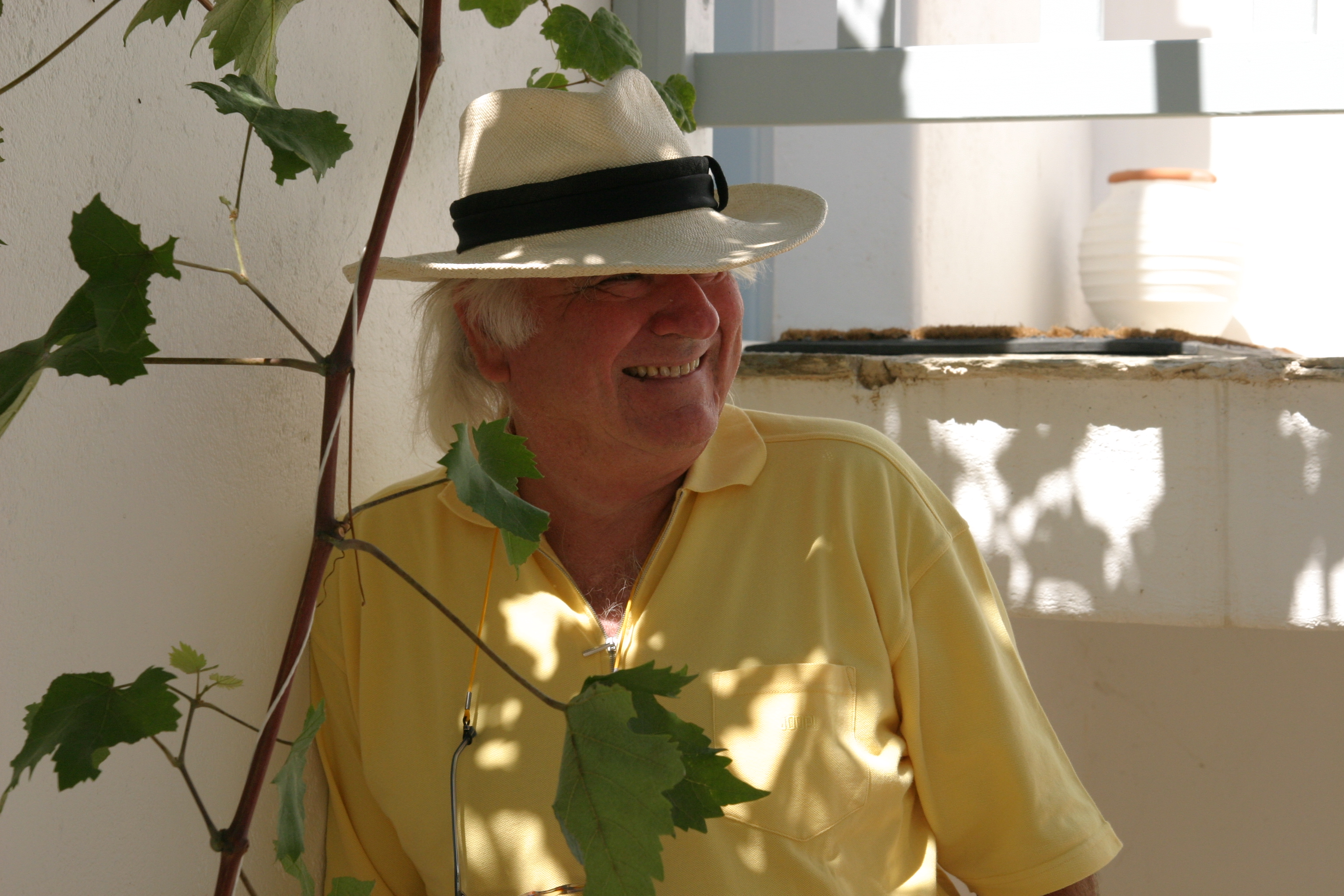
Manfred Rieker – German photographer

Manfred Rieker (born December 22, 1939, in Ihringshausen, Kassel, Germany) is a German photographer and photo designer. He works in the advertising field for national and international corporate clients and individuals in the automobile, furniture and show business industry.

== Life ==
Manfred Rieker was born in 1939 in Ihringshausen near Fuldatal, Germany. In 1969 became a self-employed advertising photographer. He has worked with national and international companies and individuals such as Kodak, Siemens, Zumtobel, Interstuhl or the Jazz musician Charly Antolini, Mercedes, and Audi. Audi had an exclusive agreement with Rieker starting 1985 for which he created a custom made light concept.

1973 the Professional Association of Freelance Photographers and Film Creators (BFF Berufsverband Freie Fotografen und Filmgestalter) honored him with a membership and thereby officially recognized him as a freelance artist. He is also a member of the creative elite organization Art Directors Club Germany.

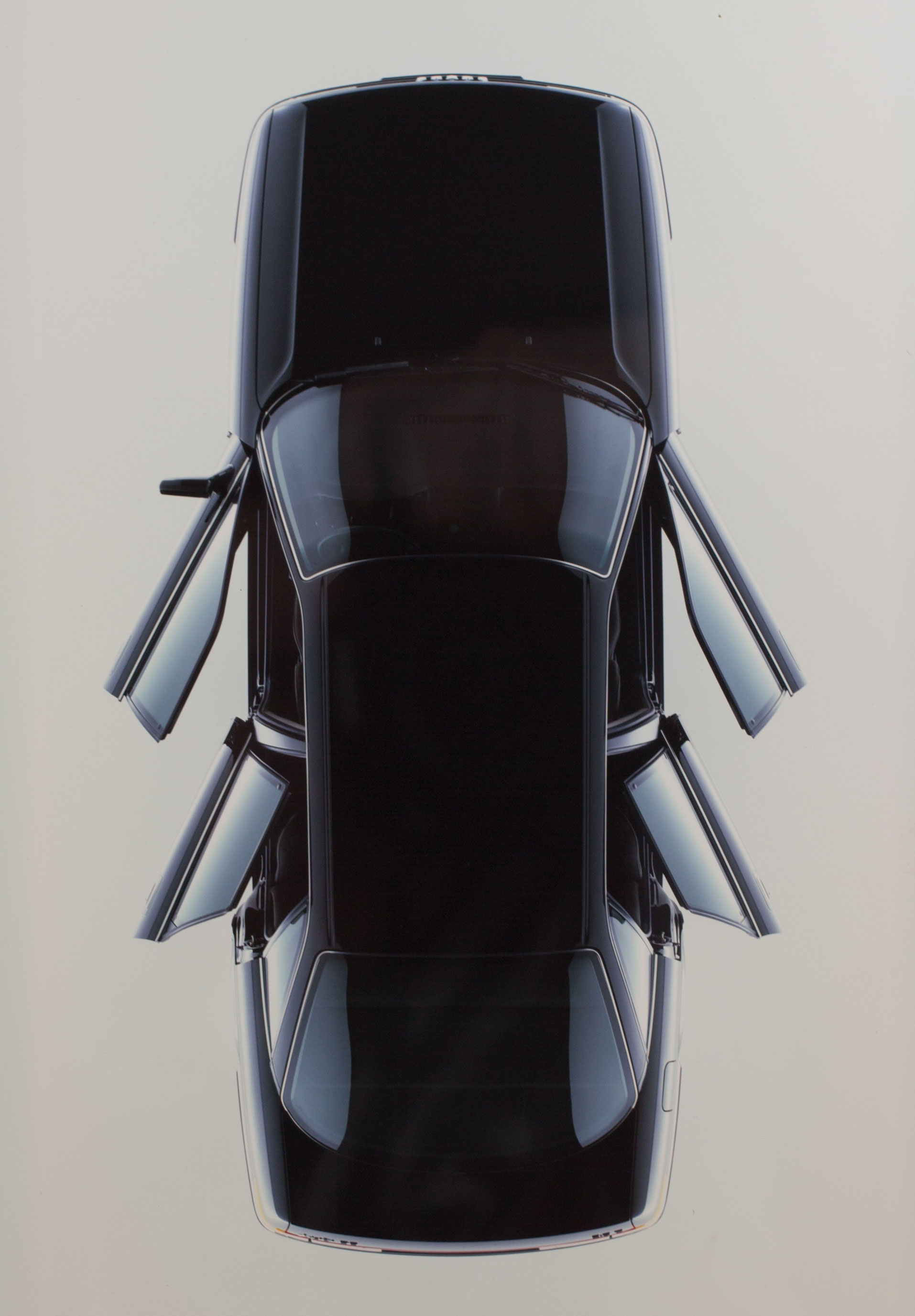
Audi

In 1972 Rieker opened his first photo studio in Magstadt near Stuttgart followed by the outdoor studio "Ilios Fotodesign“ in Porto Heli, Greece in 1986. He designed the villa and photo platform himself. This location was setting for ad campaigns and works for i.e. Mercedes-Benz, Porsche, Ergoline, or Bugatti. In 2012 Rieker sold the property to the Dutch.

== Work style ==
Manfred Rieker works without any software-based photo editor programs but uses direct and indirect lighting instead. For his contract with Audi he had a special lighting concept and technology developed.

In 1990 he worked with Zumtobel, a German supplier of integral lighting solutions, on the study project "Aesthetics of Light – The Beginning of a New Dimension" («Lichtästhetik – Aufbruch in eine neue Dimension»). The project's goal was to use direct and indirect lightning as a fourth dimension to create a harmony through its impact on diverse objects. More specifically, while the action of light covers the light fixtures’ dimension the factors such as basic components and various, idealistic fundamental types were sufficient for the spatial concept in to implement the architectonical open-space planning.

== Works ==
- Carts

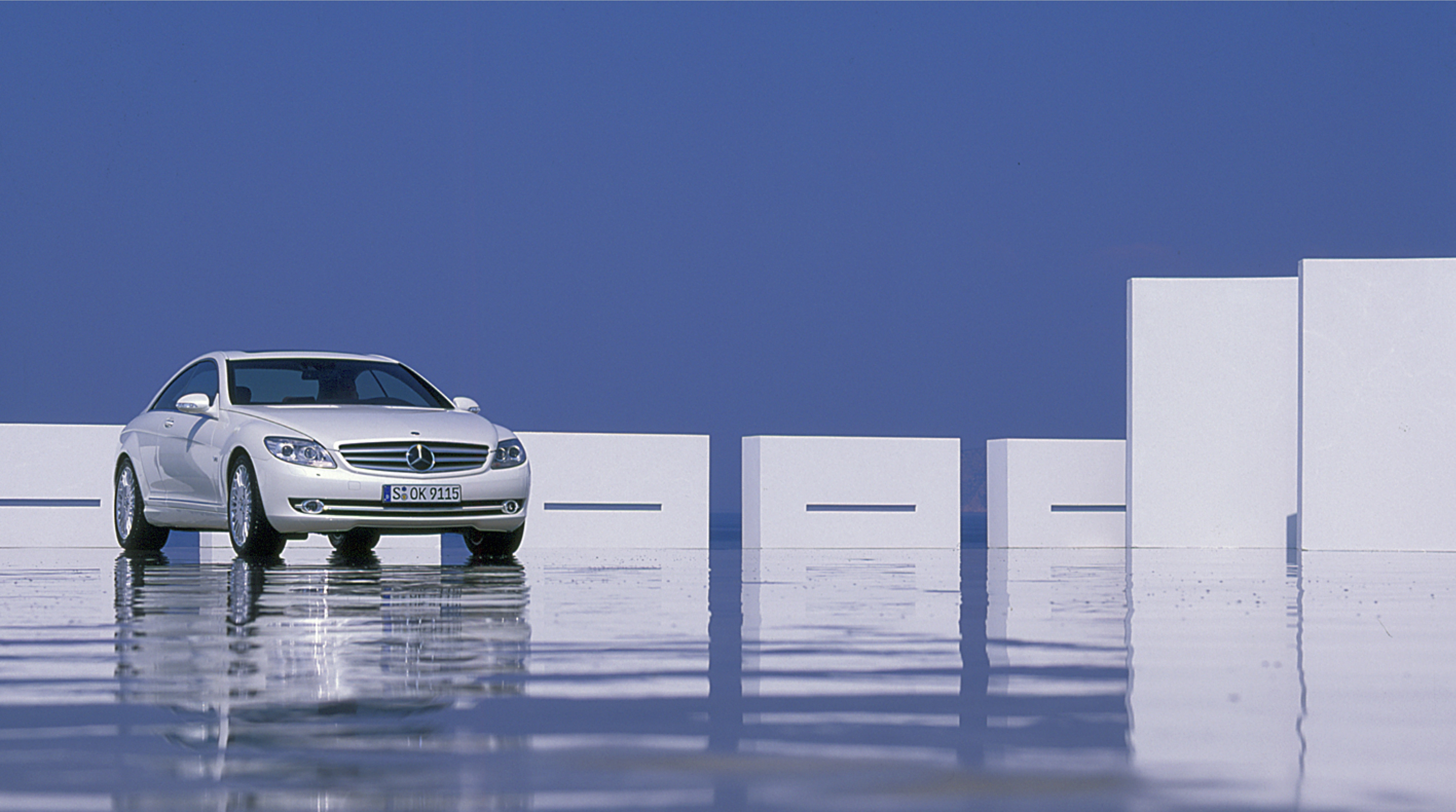
Mercedes Benz by Manfred Rieker

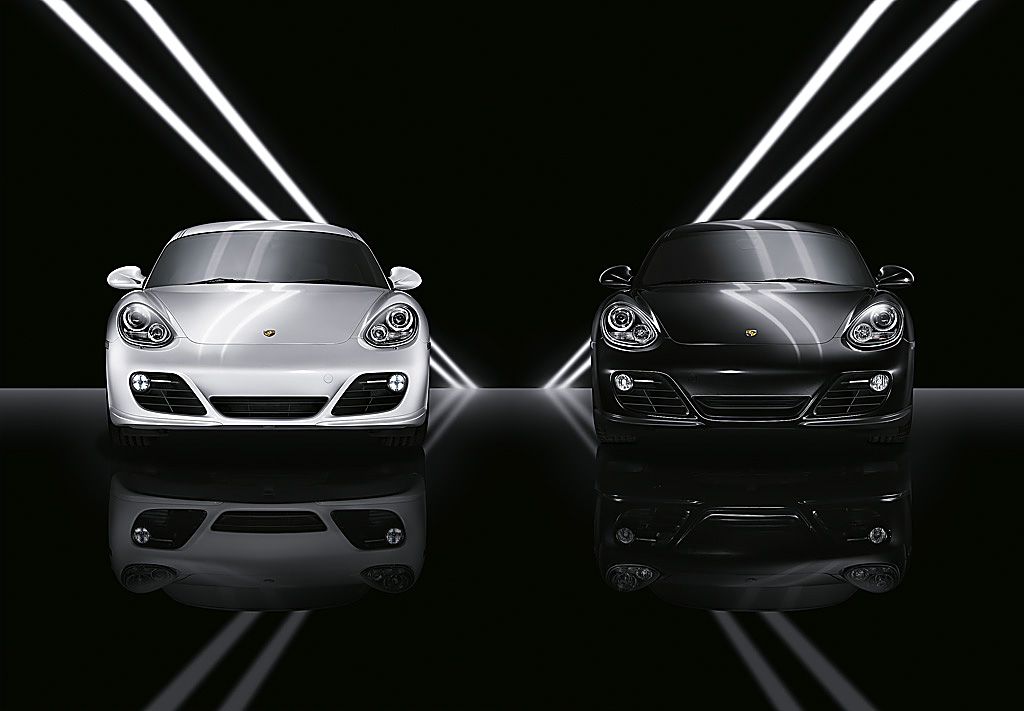
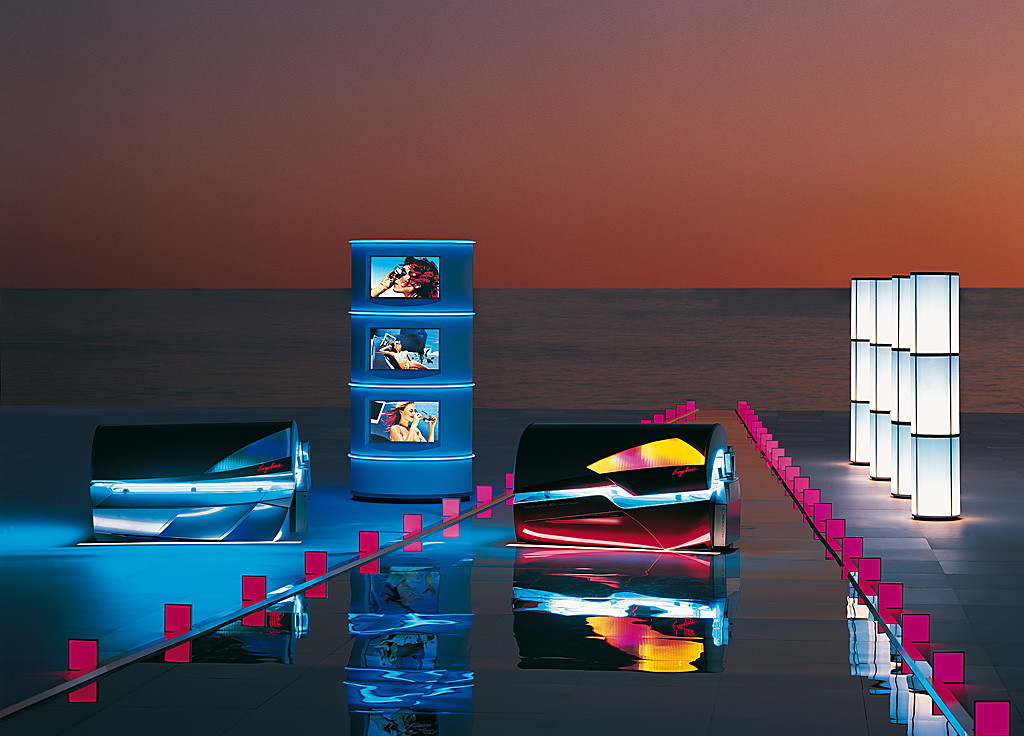

== Awards ==
- 1982 1st prize „Etoiles et Calandres, Support de L'iamginaire" Daimler-Benz France
- 1982 Nomina di Accademico Benemerito von Accademia Internazionale dell’Arte Fotografica
- 1983 Silver medal awarded by the Art Directors Club for „Die Audi-Plakate 1983“
- 1983 Bronze medal awarded by the Art Directors Club for „Die Audi-Kampgane 1983“
- 1983 Winner of the Mercedes-Benz France photo competition „Für den Besten für Manfred Rieker“
- 1984 1st prize Kodak color photography calendar prize „Perspektiven ‘84“
- 1985 Kodak color photography calendar prize 1985 for „Roadmaster“
- 1985 Silver Award by Audi AG Ingolstadt
- 1985 International Advertising Award „Technical Literature" von ICIT
- 1986 Audi Campaign Photography
- 1986 Audi Calendar
- 1987 Audi Oldtimer Calendar
- 1988 Silver Award Japan for Photography

== Memberships ==
- 1973 – 2014 Member of The Professional Association of Freelance Photographers and Film Creators BFF (Berufsverband Freier Fotografen und Filmgestalter e.V.)
- since 1984 member of the ADC Art Directors Club Germany

== Exhibitions ==
- 2006 "BFF-Icons – ZeitBlicke spanning six decades", BFF-exhibition in Cologne »visual gallery at photokina 2006« (group exhibition)
- 2007 "Photo Summer Stuttgart 2007 – BFF-Icons – ZeitBlicke spanning seven decades", Haus der Wirtschaft Baden-Württemberg (group exhibition)
- 2011 "Ein Bild von einem Auto – Mercedes-Benz im Fokus bedeutender Fotografen" („A peach of an automobile – Mercedes-Benz seen though great photographers’ lenses"), City of Sindelfingen Gallery (group exhibition)
- 2014 "Cart", Gallery Manfred Rieker (homonymy), Heilbronn

== Publications ==
- The German photographic annual, W. Strache., 1977, p. 224
- ZOOM - Magazine for creative and applied Photography, Publisher: Laterna magica Verlag, 1981
- Auto Motor und Sport: "Der Fotograf Manfred Rieker entwickelte eine neue Form der Auto-Fotografie", Ausgabe 7, 1984, p. 236
- Design, Clio Press, 1984 – Art, p. 21
- Art Directors Annual: Volume 64, ADC Publications, 1985
- MD. Moebel interior design, Konradin-Verlag Robert Kohlhammer., 1985, p. 7
- Industrial design, Unikate, Serienerzeugnisse: "Die Neue Sammlung, ein neuer Museumstyp des 20. Jahrhunderts", Hans Wichmann, Neue Sammlung, Staatliches Museum für Angewandte Kunst (Bavaria, Germany) Prestel, 1985, pp. 374, 381, 383
- Fotomagazin, Issues 7-12, Hearing-Verlag., 1985, p.123
- Photographie, Walter Herden, Graphis Press, 1986
- Form - Zeitschrift für Gestaltung 117/1987, B+W-Collection Objektmöbel Serie 90, form Frankfurt a. M., 1987
- Graphis, International Journal for Graphic and Applied Art, Volume 44, Issues 253–258, Amstutz and Herdeg., 1988
- Graphis Photo, B Martin Pedersen, Graphis Press Corporation, 1988, p. 292
- Krauss, Günter: Stuttgarter Fotografen sehen Schmuck von Günter Krauss. o.O. (Stuttgart): Selbstverlag o.J. (1989)
- Architecture intérieure-Créé, Issues 233–236, Société d'édition et de presse, 1990, p. 171
- Archithese, Niggli, 1990, p. 90
- Coop Himmelblau, 6 projects for 4 cities, Coop Himmelblau, Jürgen Häusser, Architecture, Modern, 1990, p. 52
- The Society of Publication Designers 24th Publication Design Annual, Society of Publication Designers, Watson-Guptill Publications, Incorporated, October 1, 1990, p. 32
- Domus, Issues 713-715, Gio Ponti, 1990
- Werk, Bauen+ Wohnen, Volume 77, Verlegergemeinschaft Werk, Bauen + Wohnen, 1990, p. 88
- Beiträge der Schweiz zur Technik: schweizerische Erfindungen von internationaler Bedeutung : Festschrift zum Jubiläum 700 Jahre Eidgenossenschaft, Lorenz Hälftiger, Olynthus-Verlag, 1991, S. 111
- Modo, Volumes 133-137, R.D.E. Ricerche Design, 1991, p. 41
- What Germans wanted: 30 years of photography in Germany : 30 years of the BFF, Manfred Schmalriede, Norbert Waning, Distributed Art Pub Incorporated, 1999, p. 39, p. 59
- lightlife! installation Das Infomagazin für Elektroinstallateure in Österreich, September 2006
- spotlight magazine: "cars & landscape photography issue 2", June 2007
- Architecture Preview: April 2009, p. 15
- eL Forum Fachzeitschrift für Elektronik und Elektrotechnik, June 2009, S. 17
- spotlight magazine: "cars & landscape photography Mercedes GL, Porsche Boxster, Spyder", April 2010
- spotlight magazine: "Mercedes B-Class – Porsche models, including the Panamera", October 2011
- autoSTIMME: IAA 2011 “Für jeden Geschmack das Passende”, 21. September 2011, Titelblatt und p. 12
- KAP Magazin: "LEDs control light", November 2009, p. 37
- LeBook: "Porsche-Boxter-981-Catalog", 2012
- Insterstuhl: Kalender, Image: Month May, 2012
- Die Kunst der Kommunikation: Analysen und Strategien: Image 6
- Kohl – Desiro: Image 4
- Wunderkind: Werbekampagne: Image 23
