= Centre Ice Rink =

Coordinates: 38.91451°N 75.57084°W

Centre Ice Arena

- Location within Delaware Location within the United States
- Location: 644 Fairgrounds Road, Harrington, Delaware 19952
- Owner: Delaware State Fair
- Capacity: 700
- Surface: 200' x 85' (hockey)

Construction
- Opened: 2002
- Closed: May 2025

Tenants
- Salisbury Gulls (ACHA); Delaware Thunder (FPHL) (2019–2023)

The Centre Ice Arena, also called The Centre, was a 700-seat, 49,000 square-foot facility built in 2002. It was located on the Delaware State Fairgrounds in Harrington, Delaware. The facility held an ice rink and hosted ice hockey, figure skating and public skating in the winter, and then hosted 4-H and FFA exhibits and demonstrations during the Delaware State Fair in the summer.

== Ice hockey ==
The Salisbury University Gulls club ice hockey team played home games at the Centre. The Federal Prospects Hockey League's Delaware Thunder also played home games at the arena from 2019 until 2023.

== Figure skating ==
The Bay Country Figure Skating Club's skaters performed shows and practiced at the Centre.

== Closure ==
On January 24th, 2025, the Delaware State Fair announced on its website and social media that the Centre would close as an ice venue after the completion of the 2024-2025 season. This decision was made after the State Fair's board of directors voted to shut down the arena in light of rising maintenance costs and "several mechanical failures occurring in late November [2024] leading to overwhelming capital funds needed to bring the Rink online for current and future operations." The decision was met with criticism by the local community, who had no say on the matter as the Fair and its property is privately owned.

The last day of operation for the Centre was May 18th, 2025.
