= Albert Rieker =

American sculptor (1889–1959)

- Born: 1889; Eislingen, Germany
- Died: 1959 (aged 69–70); Clermont Harbor, Mississippi, U.S.
- Occupation: Sculptor

Albert Rieker (1889–1959) was an American sculptor. He designed public sculptures in Louisiana and Mississippi.

== Early life ==
Albert Rieker was born in 1889 in Eislingen, Germany. He emigrated to the United States in 1923.

== Career ==
Rieker became a sculptor in New Orleans, Louisiana, where his designs are found in the City Hall and the First Baptist Church. His 1940 bust of Governor Huey P. Long can be seen at the Ogden Museum of Southern Art in New Orleans. Rieker also designed the statue of Jean-Baptiste Le Moyne, Sieur de Bienville inside the Louisiana State Capitol in Baton Rouge, Louisiana. Other public sculptures can be found in Monroe, Louisiana.

Rieker designed "two friezes" on the War Memorial Building in Jackson, Mississippi, which is listed as a contributing property to the Old Capitol on the National Register of Historic Places.

== Death ==
Rieker resided in and summered in Clermont Harbor, Mississippi. He died in 1959 in Clermont Harbor.
