= Delaware State Fair =

Annual event in Harrington, Delaware

Coordinates: 38.910°N 75.574°W

- Genre: Fair
- Begins: 23 July 2026
- Ends: 1 August 2026
- Frequency: Annually
- Locations: Harrington, Delaware
- Years active: 1919–1941, since 1946
- Inaugurated: 27 July 1920
- Area: Delaware, Pennsylvania, New Jersey, Maryland
- Website: delawarestatefair.com

The Delaware State Fair is the annual state fair for the U.S. state of Delaware. It is held in Harrington. The fair is a ten-day event at the end of July.

== History ==
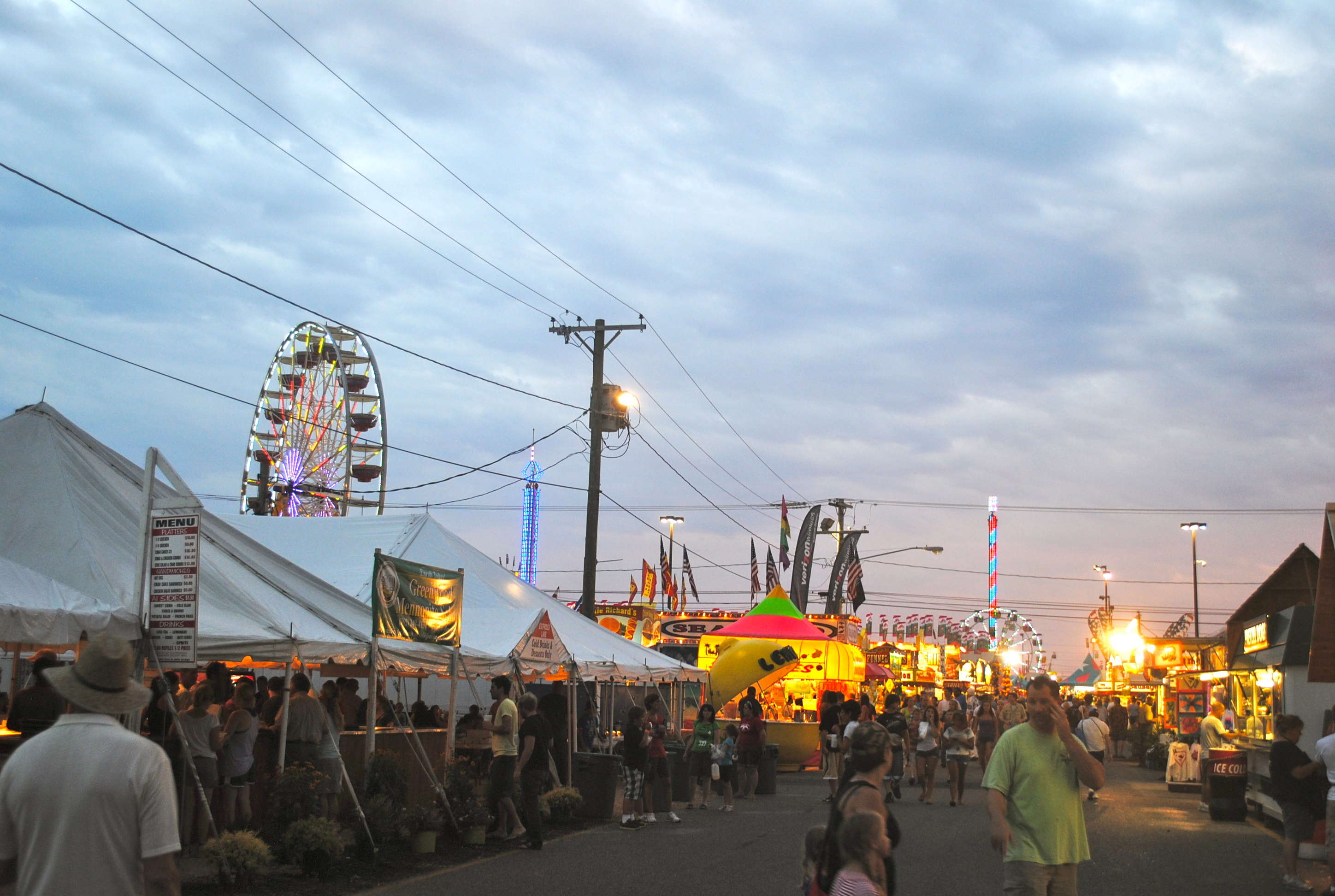
The midway of the Delaware State Fair in 2012

The first Delaware State Fair was held in Wilmington, with mentions of the "Delaware State Fair" being found in newspapers as far back as 1869. In 1878, the Delaware State Fair was moved to Fairview Park Fair Grounds in Dover and held September 24–27. The opening speaker of the 1878 Delaware State Fair was Daniel Henry Chamberlain, former Republican Governor of South Carolina, as well as guest speakers J. Proctor Knott, at the time a Democratic member of the United States House of Representatives representing Kentucky's 4th congressional district, and Samuel S. Cox, then Democratic member of the United States House of Representatives representing New York's 6th congressional district.

In 1917, the state fair moved to Elsmere where the Delaware State Fair Association had purchased property and built a fairgrounds within the town limits, in the area of the current Filbert, Birch, and Dover Avenues. The fairgrounds included racetracks, agricultural exhibits, and stages for various entertainment acts. The Association went bankrupt after the 1924 fair, and its assets were sold off. A new fair association was formed and held the Wilmington Fair, which was sometimes referred to as the Delaware State Fair, in 1927 and 1928 at the fairgrounds in Elsmere.

The first fair on the current grounds was held in 1920 and was known as the Kent and Sussex County Fair. It lasted four days and was held on 30 acres (120,000 m^{2}). The Kent and Sussex County Fair changed its name to the Delaware State Fair in 1962. Today the fairgrounds encompass over 300 acres (1.2 km^{2}) and feature concerts, wrestling, rodeo, races, agricultural exhibits, a midway, and other typical state fair demonstrations and events. The Harrington Raceway & Casino is also located at the fairgrounds. The property also hosted a Donald Trump rally for his presidential campaign on April 22, 2016.

The only cancellations were from 1942 to 1945 due to World War II. Despite the COVID-19 pandemic in 2020, the fair resisted cancellation, although safety modifications were put in place and concerts were cancelled. Masks were required up until recent years, and as of 2024, are no longer required to enter the fair.

== Concerts ==
The Delaware State Fair has long been a center for regional entertainment, drawing in crowds from the rest of the state, Pennsylvania, New Jersey, and Maryland. It is one of only a few local concert venues, so it has been able to attract many popular acts to Delmarva, among them:

- David Cook
- Kelly Clarkson
- Gin Blossoms
- Demi Lovato
- Chuck Wicks
- Julianne Hough
- Darius Rucker
- Jeff Dunham
- Brad Paisley
- Toby Keith
- Flo Rida
- New Found Glory
- Paramore
- Carrie Underwood
- Daughtry
- Gloria Estefan
- Milli Vanilli
- New Kids on the Block
- Tiffany
- Color Me Badd
- George Jones
- Tammy Wynette
- Alan Jackson
- LeAnn Rimes
- Joe Diffie
- Lynyrd Skynyrd
- The Presidents of the United States of America
- Savage Garden
- Pam Tillis
- Hank Williams Jr.
- Charlie Daniels Band
- Travis Tritt
- Jo Dee Messina
- Larry the Cable Guy
- Bill Cosby
- Shai
- Sawyer Brown
- Brooks and Dunn
- Tracy Lawrence
- Young MC
- Trace Adkins
- Three Days Grace
- Miranda Cosgrove
- Greyson Chance
- Ke$ha
- Big Time Rush
- Rascal Flatts
- Lady Antebellum
- The Ataris
- Yellowcard
- TNA Wrestling
- Austin Mahone
- Casting Crowns
- Keith Urban
- Meghan Trainor
- Staind
- 3 Doors Down
- Brantley Gilbert
- Jason Aldean
- Dan + Shay
- “Weird Al” Yankovic

== Casino ==
Harrington Raceway & Casino operates on the fairgrounds year round and consists of a harness racetrack and a casino offering slot machines, table games, and sports betting.

== Winter Season ==
During the winter season the Centre Ice Rink located on the fair grounds hosts public skating and Ice hockey sessions.

In January 2025, it was announced by the Fair that the Centre would close as an ice rink due to rising maintenance costs.
