= Silver Slipper Casino (Waveland) =

Casino hotel in Mississippi, United States

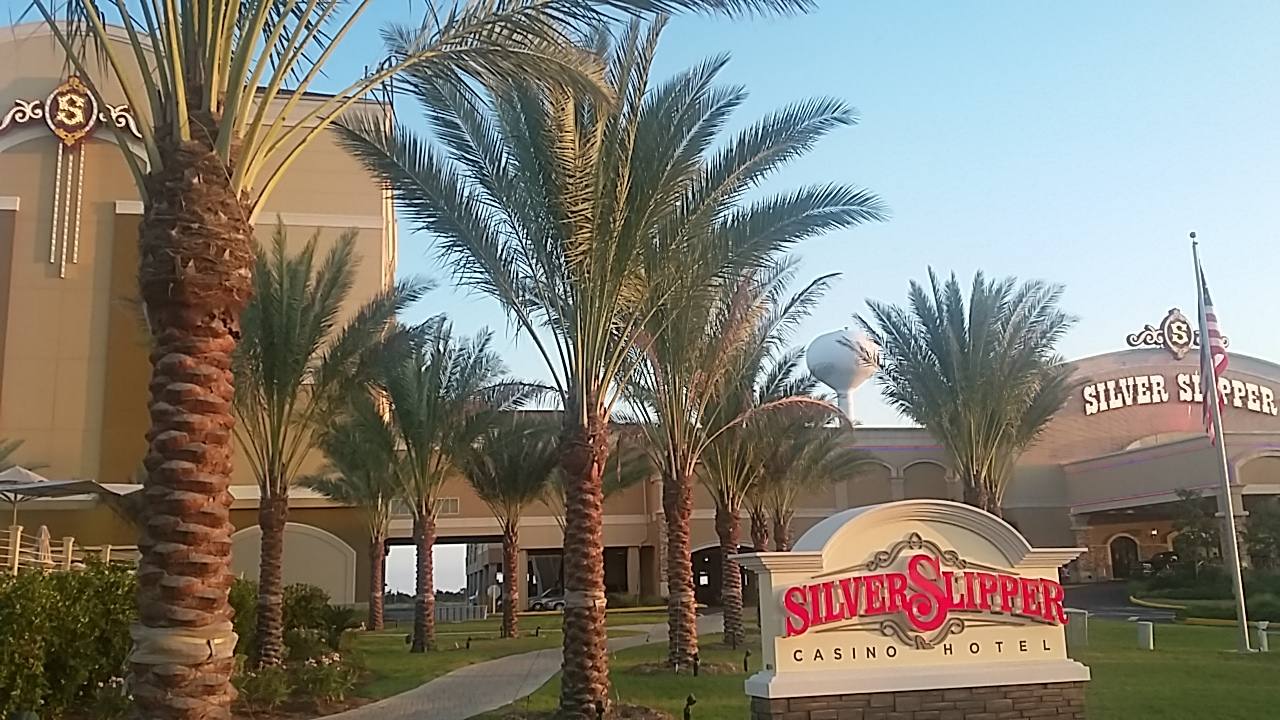
- Interactive map of Silver Slipper Casino
- Location: Lakeshore, Mississippi; 5000 South Beach Blvd.; 30.2391°N 89.42547°W
- Opened: November 9, 2006
- No. of rooms: 129
- Gaming space: 30,000 sq ft (2,800 m^{2})
- Casino type: Land-based (formerly barge)
- Owner: Full House Resorts
- Previous names: President Casino
- Website: silverslipper-ms.com

Silver Slipper Casino is a beachfront casino and hotel in Hancock County, Mississippi, owned and operated by Full House Resorts. The casino has over 961 slots, 28 table games, a keno parlor and a sports book. Dining options include a buffet, a 24-hour café, a fine dining restaurant, and an oyster bar.

== History ==
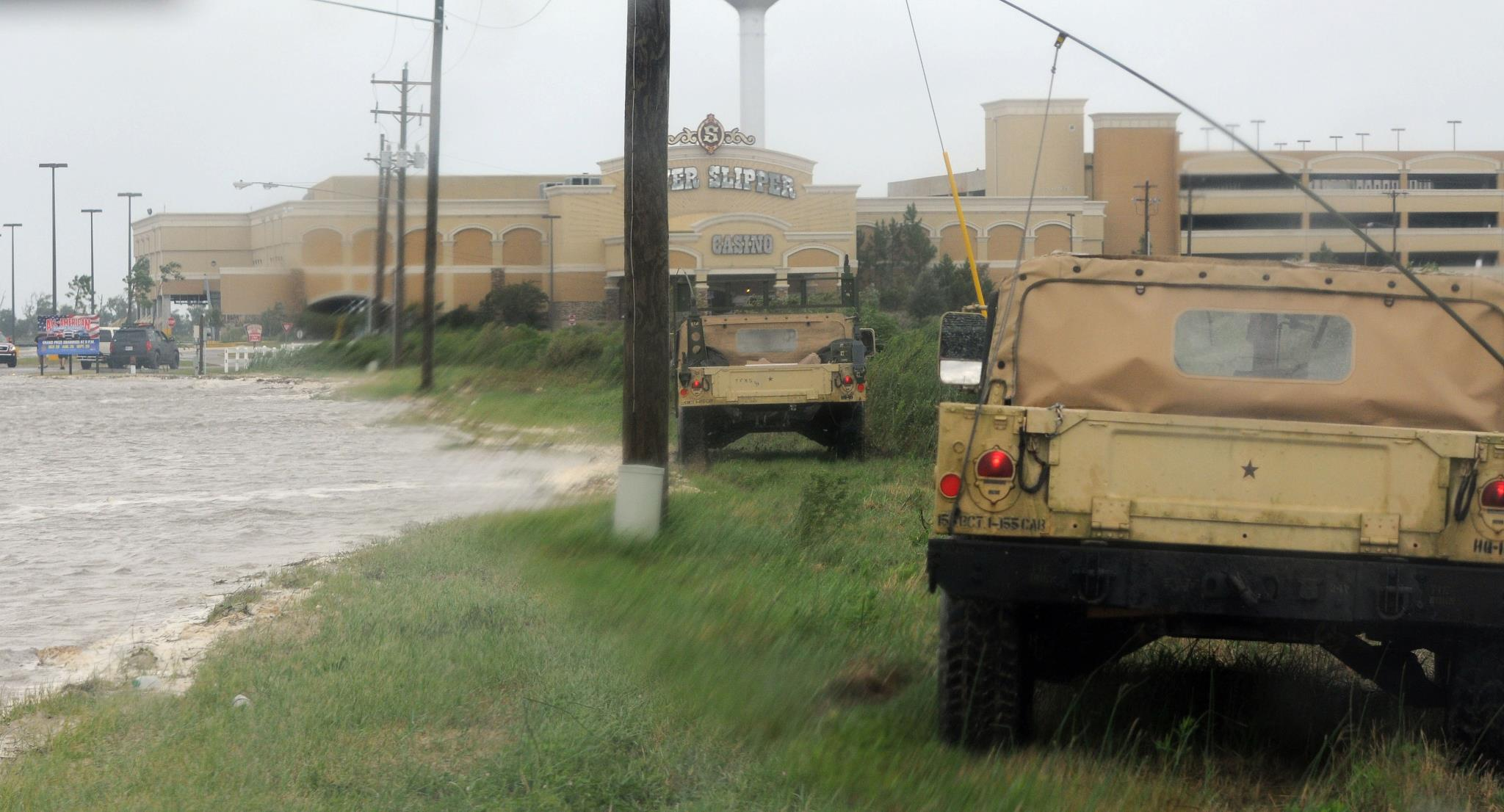
Mississippi National Guard at Silver Slipper Casino during Hurricane Isaac (2012)

The casino was originally called Bayou Caddy's Jubilee Casino. In 2005, plans were underway to replace the gaming vessel with the barge used by the defunct President Casino. But Hurricane Katrina destroyed the casino barge before it could be moved to its new location.

In the wake of Katrina, the Mississippi Gaming Commission changed its casino rules to allow land-based casinos. The Silver Slipper opened on November 9, 2006, as the first ground up built casino on the Mississippi Gulf Coast.

A wall inside the casino paid homage to the legacy of the Silver Slipper, a Las Vegas casino that closed its doors in 1988.

In October 2012, Full House Resorts acquired the casino for $70 million, with plans to potentially add a hotel. Construction on a 6 floor hotel began in summer of 2014, and topping-off occurred in November. The hotel opened in May 2015.

It was announced in March 2021, the Silver Slipper would get a $75 million dollar expansion that would add a new hotel tower at the resort with a first-floor spa and include an entertainment and meeting venue. The new hotel would double the number of hotel rooms at the casino resort.
