= Lakeshore, Mississippi =

- Unincorporated community
- Location within the state of Mississippi Lakeshore, Mississippi (the United States)
- Coordinates: 30°14′48″N 89°26′09″W
- Country: United States
- State: Mississippi
- County: Hancock
- Elevation: 9.8 ft (3 m)
- Time zone: UTC-6 (Central (CST))
  - Summer (DST): UTC-5 (CDT)
- ZIP code: 39558
- GNIS feature ID: 711739

Lakeshore is an unincorporated community on the western end of Hancock County, Mississippi. It is part of the Gulfport–Biloxi, Mississippi Metropolitan Statistical Area.

Lakeshore is located on the current CSX Transportation line and was a depot on the Louisville and Nashville Railroad.

A post office first began operation under the name Lakeshore in 1901.

CNN Correspondent Gary Tuchman, speaking of this small gulf coast community known as Lakeshore Mississippi, reported "no place was hit harder by Hurricane Katrina on August 29, 2005."

Lakeshore is the site of the Silver Slipper Casino.
