= Harrington, Delaware =

City in Delaware, United States

- City
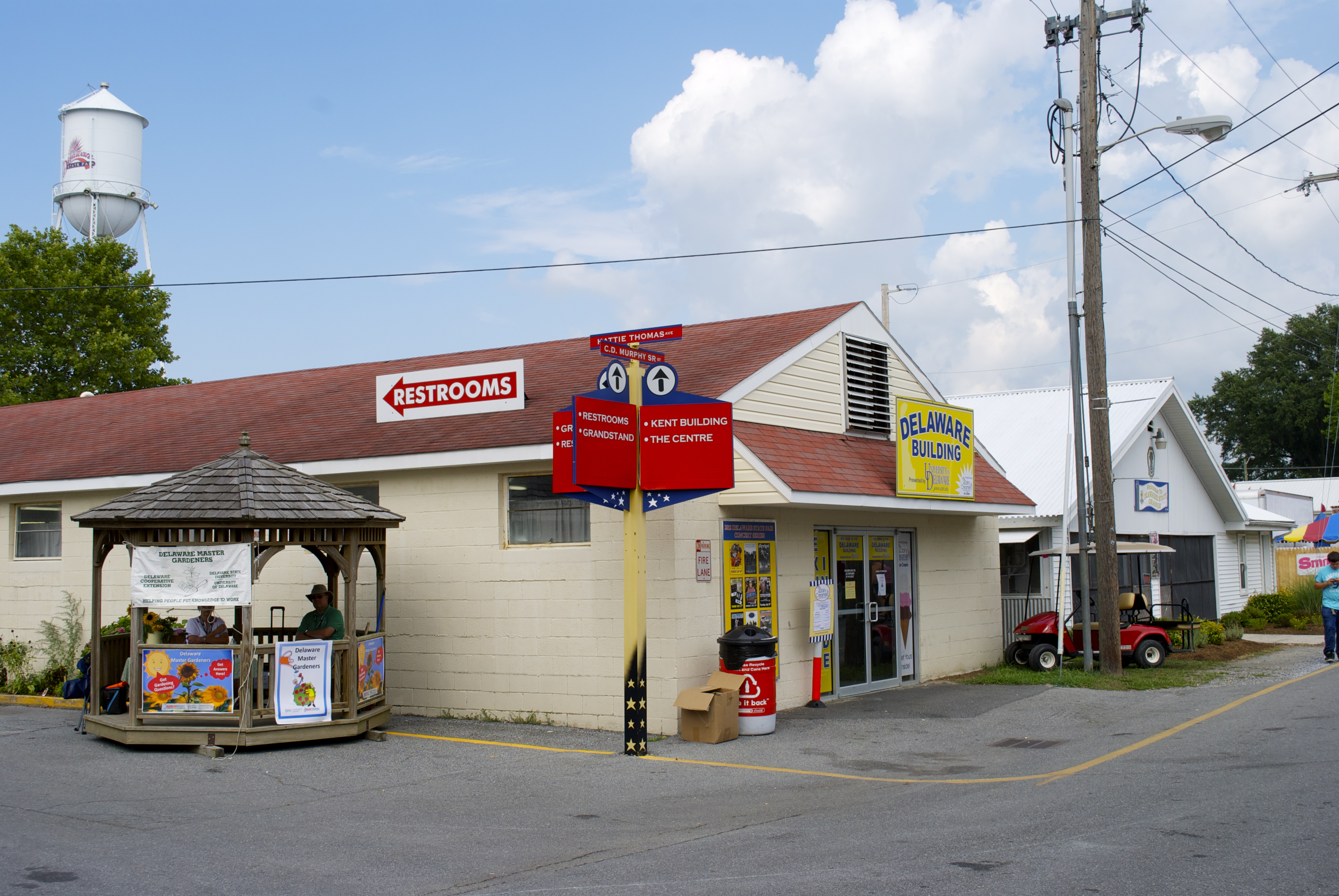

- Flag Seal
- Etymology: Hon. Samuel M. Harrington
- Motto: The Hub of Delaware
- Location of Harrington in Kent County, Delaware.

- Location within the state of Delaware Harrington (the United States)
- Coordinates: 38°55′25″N 75°34′40″W
- Country: United States
- State: Delaware
- County: Kent

Government
  - Type: Mayor-council
  - Mayor: Frank Tolson

Area
  - Total: 2.73 sq mi (7.07 km^{2})
  - Land: 2.72 sq mi (7.05 km^{2})
  - Water: 0.0077 sq mi (0.02 km^{2})
- Elevation: 59 ft (18 m)

Population (2020)
  - Total: 3,774
  - Density: 1,385.5/sq mi (534.95/km^{2})
- Time zone: UTC−5 (Eastern (EST))
  - Summer (DST): UTC−4 (EDT)
- ZIP code: 19952
- Area code: 302
- FIPS code: 10-33120
- GNIS feature ID: 214060
- Website: harrington.delaware.gov

Harrington is a city in Kent County, Delaware, United States. It is part of the Dover metropolitan statistical area. Harrington hosts the annual Delaware State Fair each July. The population was 3,774 in 2020.

== History ==
Harrington was named for Hon. Samuel Maxwell Harrington, a former chancellor of the state. The town developed at a railroad junction along the Delaware Railroad and served as a rural trading center.

== Geography ==
Harrington is located at 38°55′25″N 75°34′40″W (38.9237244, –75.5777033).

According to the United States Census Bureau, the city has a total area of 2.0 square miles (5.2 km^{2}), of which 2.0 square miles (5.2 km^{2}) is land and 0.04 square miles (0.10 km^{2}) (1.48%) is water.

== Government ==
Harrington has a mayor-council system of government. As of 2025, the mayor of Harrington is Frank Tolson. The mayor of Harrington has a term limit of eight consecutive years while city council members have term limits of nine consecutive years. Term limits were implemented in 2017 and Harrington is one of only a few municipalities in Delaware with term limits for municipal officials.

== Infrastructure ==
=== Transportation ===
==== Highway and bus ====
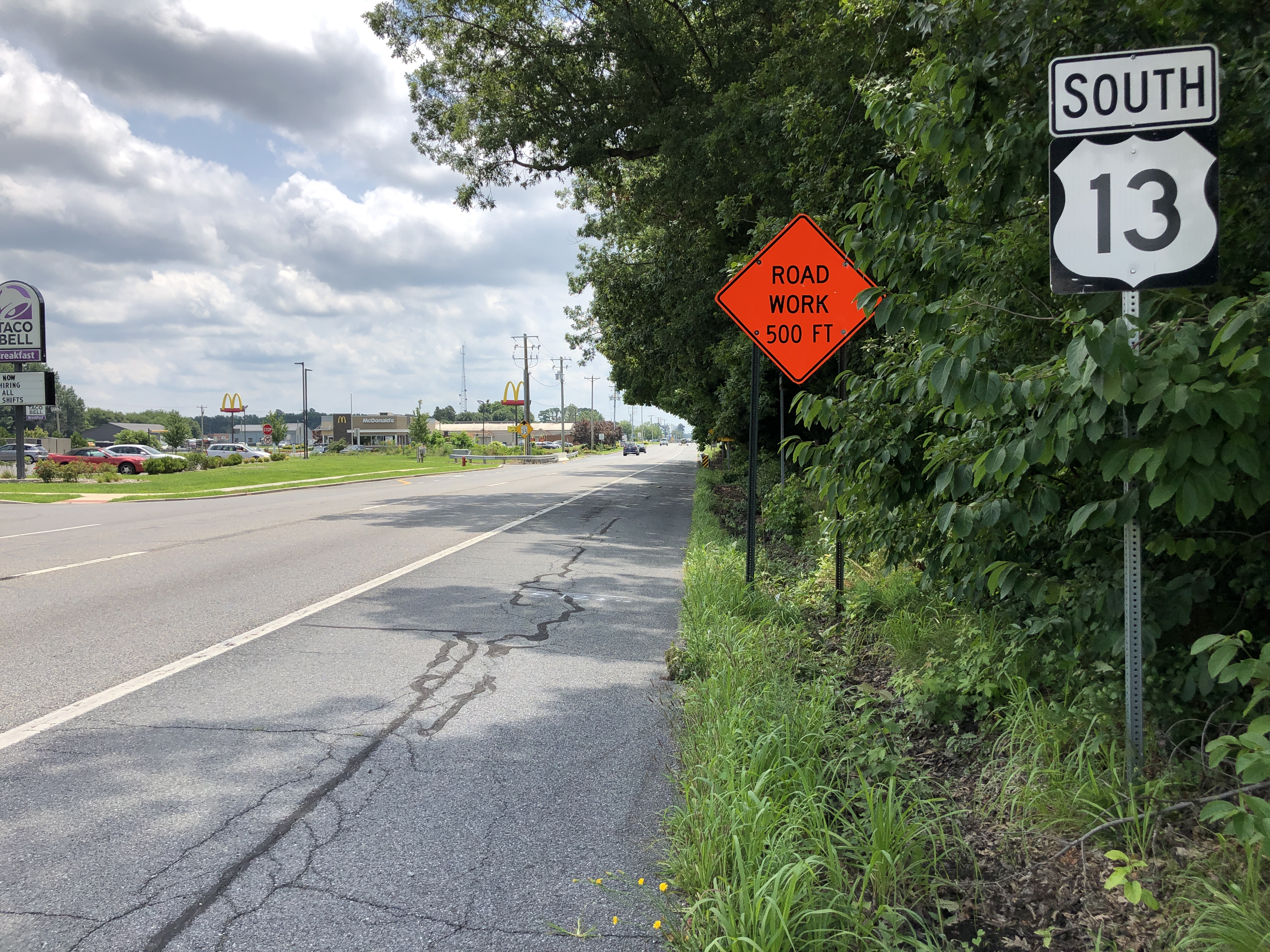
US 13 southbound in Harrington

U.S. Route 13 (Dupont Highway) serves as the main north–south road in Harrington, heading north toward Dover and south toward Salisbury, Maryland. Delaware Route 14 serves as the main east–west road in Harrington, heading west toward Denton, Maryland and east toward Milford. DART First State provides bus service to Harrington along Route 117, which heads north toward Camden and connects to the local bus routes serving the Dover area.

==== Railroad ====
Harrington is a railroad junction of the north–south running Delmarva Central Railroad that runs between Porter, near Wilmington to Pocomoke City, Maryland. The Indian River Subdivision branches at Harrington from the Delmarva Subdivision toward the coast then turns south and runs through Georgetown to Frankford, Delaware. The Delmarva Central Railroad, which is based in Oakmont, Pennsylvania, is locally managed from offices in Harrington and some of its freight operations are based out of the town.

As of 2019, the former Pennsylvania Railroad (PRR) tower adjacent to the Harrington depot that at one time manually controlled the junction's switches and signals is now a preserved heritage item along with an adjacent PRR caboose in its original Tuscan Red color. Into the 1950s, the PRR's Del-Mar-Va Express steam powered passenger train that ran between Philadelphia, Pennsylvania and Cape Charles, Virginia stopped at Harrington.

=== Utilities ===
Delmarva Power, a subsidiary of Exelon, provides electricity to Harrington. Chesapeake Utilities provides natural gas to the city. The City of Harrington Public Works Department provides water and sewer service to Harrington. The city formerly had its own wastewater treatment plant but now transports its sewage to the Kent County wastewater treatment plant in Frederica. Charlie's Waste Services provides trash and recycling collection in Harrington.

== Education ==
Harrington is within the Lake Forest School District. The zoned high school is Lake Forest High School.

== Demographics ==
Historical population
Census	Pop.	Note	%±
1880	745		—
1900	1,242		—
1910	1,500		20.8%
1920	1,617		7.8%
1930	1,812		12.1%
1940	2,113		16.6%
1950	2,241		6.1%
1960	2,495		11.3%
1970	2,407		−3.5%
1980	2,405		−0.1%
1990	2,311		−3.9%
2000	3,174		37.3%
2010	3,562		12.2%
2020	3,774		6.0%
U.S. Decennial Census

=== 2020 census ===
As of the 2020 census, Harrington had a population of 3,774. The median age was 35.0 years. 25.6% of residents were under the age of 18 and 15.3% of residents were 65 years of age or older. For every 100 females there were 84.3 males, and for every 100 females age 18 and over there were 80.5 males age 18 and over.

99.2% of residents lived in urban areas, while 0.8% lived in rural areas.

There were 1,512 households in Harrington, of which 36.8% had children under the age of 18 living in them. Of all households, 31.6% were married-couple households, 19.3% were households with a male householder and no spouse or partner present, and 39.0% were households with a female householder and no spouse or partner present. About 29.2% of all households were made up of individuals and 12.7% had someone living alone who was 65 years of age or older.

There were 1,661 housing units, of which 9.0% were vacant. The homeowner vacancy rate was 2.1% and the rental vacancy rate was 8.0%.

Racial composition as of the 2020 census
Race	Number	Percent
White	2,277	60.3%
Black or African American	968	25.6%
American Indian and Alaska Native	22	0.6%
Asian	26	0.7%
Native Hawaiian and Other Pacific Islander	0	0.0%
Some other race	126	3.3%
Two or more races	355	9.4%
Hispanic or Latino (of any race)	276	7.3%

=== 2000 census ===
As of the 2000 census, there were 3,174 people, 1,223 households, and 825 families residing in the city. The population density was 1,587.1 inhabitants per square mile (612.8/km^{2}). There were 1,328 housing units at an average density of 664.0 units per square mile (256.4 units/km^{2}). The racial makeup of the city was 75.2% White, 21.6% African American, 0.3% Native American, 0.4% Asian, 0.1% Pacific Islander, 0.7% from other races, and 1.7% from two or more races. Hispanic or Latino of any race were 2.5% of the population.

There were 1,223 households, out of which 37.1% had children under the age of 18 living with them, 43.9% were married couples living together, 18.7% had a female householder with no husband present, and 32.5% were non-families. 27.5% of all households were made up of individuals, and 13.0% had someone living alone who was 65 years of age or older. The average household size was 2.60 and the average family size was 3.13.

In the city, the population was spread out, with 31.3% under the age of 18, 9.0% from 18 to 24, 27.7% from 25 to 44, 18.4% from 45 to 64, and 13.5% who were 65 years of age or older. The median age was 32 years. For every 100 females, there were 84.6 males. For every 100 females age 18 and over, there were 81.8 males.

The median income for a household in the city was $30,945, and the median income for a family was $36,815. Males had a median income of $32,064 versus $20,801 for females. The per capita income for the city was $15,049. About 12.1% of families and 16.5% of the population were below the poverty line, including 26.7% of those under age 18 and 13.3% of those age 65 or over.

== Places of attraction and Famous Residents ==
South of Harrington is the Harrington Raceway & Casino, which is located on the Delaware State Fairgrounds. The Delaware State Fair holds a 10-day event in July annually and celebrated its centennial in 2019. The fair has been a venue for top national entertainment in recent years with acts such as Taylor Swift, Reba McEntire, Carrie Underwood, Little Big Town, Gladys Knight and Brad Paisley among many more artists who have performed on the M&T Bank Grandstand stage. The fairgrounds also features the Centre Ice Rink.

Harrington Raceway has been the home of a harness racing meet for over 75 years. Despite the town's diminutive size, some of Harrington's most famous residents have been the horses, including three recent Dan Patch Award honorees. In 2004, Rainbow Blue and 2015 Wiggle It Jiggleit both received that distinguished title of Horse of the Year and in 2019, Shartin N accomplished the impressive feat. Many other horses from the 19952 ZIP code have received divisional honors and throughout 2019, the aforementioned Shartin N was ranked the #1 horse in the country, prior to winning top honors. Amidst Shartin's ascent, yet another Harrington horse, Lather Up, was making headlines as he equaled harness racing's all-time fastest time of 1:46 in July 2019 at the Meadowlands Racetrack in New Jersey. Coincidentally, Lather Up was stabled 4 miles to the east of Harrington Raceway at George Teague Jr's farm, while Shartin N's training base was 4 miles west of the racetrack at the farm of Jo Ann Looney and Jim King Jr. The town's rich harness racing history dates back to the 1950s when Adios Harry was named aged pacer of the year and was one of the town's first nationally recognized horses. He was even on the cover of the July 23, 1956 Sports Illustrated, with the headline, Adios Harry: World's Fastest Pacer! In 2021, yet another horse hailing from Harrington was making headlines - as Lyons Sentinel was ranked the #1 in the country as of October 5.

The town post office contains a wax tempera mural, Men Hoeing, painted in 1941 by Eve Salisbury. Federally commissioned murals were produced from 1934 to 1943 in the United States through the Section of Painting and Sculpture, later called the Section of Fine Arts, of the Treasury Department.
