= Great American Outdoor Show =

Annual outdoor recreation show

- Genre: Outdoor, sportsman, hunting
- Frequency: Annual
- Venue: Pennsylvania Farm Show Complex & Expo Center
- Locations: Harrisburg, Pennsylvania, U.S.
- Coordinates: 40.2865°N 76.8839°W
- Years active: 2014–2020, 2022–present
- Attendance: 250,000 (2015)
- Sponsor: National Rifle Association (2015–present)
- Website: www.greatamericanoutdoorshow.org

The Great American Outdoor Show (GAOS) is the world's largest outdoor recreation show and expo which is held annually in Harrisburg, Pennsylvania. The show, which was first held in 2014, was previously called the Eastern Sports and Outdoor Show (from 1956 to 2013). The venue of the event was the Pennsylvania Farm Show Complex & Expo Center in Harrisburg. In 2015, the event registered an attendance record exceeding 250,000 people.

The show draws outdoor and hunting enthusiasts from Pennsylvania, New York, Ohio, West Virginia, Virginia, Maryland, New Jersey, Vermont, Maine, and hundreds from the Midwest and international guests.

The expo, which was previously called the Eastern Sports and Outdoor Show, occurred annually from 1955 until 2012. In 2013 there was no show, which was reported to be an $80 million loss to the local economy. In 2014 the show saw a re-branding when it returned and looking for a sponsor saw a multimillion-dollar deal with the National Rifle Association.

== History ==
=== 20th century ===
The show replaced a similar event called the Eastern Sports and Outdoor Show which had been held annually in the same location since 1955. That first year 25 vendors participated with an estimated one to two thousand attended a two-day expo. By 1960 over 150 vendors with an attendance of 20,000 visitors were recorded. During this time the outdoor show was the largest in Pennsylvania and one of the largest in the Northeast United States. In 1981, the show reached 100,000 visitors for the first time.

=== 21st century ===
In 2010, the show included more than 1,000 hunting and fishing related vendors and over 500 outfitters from around the world. In January 2013 the shows promoter Reed Exhibitions announced that semi-automatic rifles would not be on display or for sale. They also added companies who specialized in semi-automatic firearms, which were banned from the show following several school shootings in the U.S. This caused hundreds of other vendors and retailers to pull out of the show. Reed Exhibitions cancelled the show in late January 2013.

In 2014, the National Rifle Association picked up where the previous show collapsed, and sponsored the newly renamed Great American Outdoor Show, touting it as bigger and better than before. The show saw a record crowd of over 250,000 at the 2015 show, this being an estimation: NRA members have said the attendance may have been as much as 325,000.

The show went on hiatus for 2021 due to the COVID-19 pandemic, but it returned in 2022. In 2024, then former-U.S. President Donald Trump was the show's keynote speaker.

== Show operations ==
=== Notable speakers, presenters, guests ===
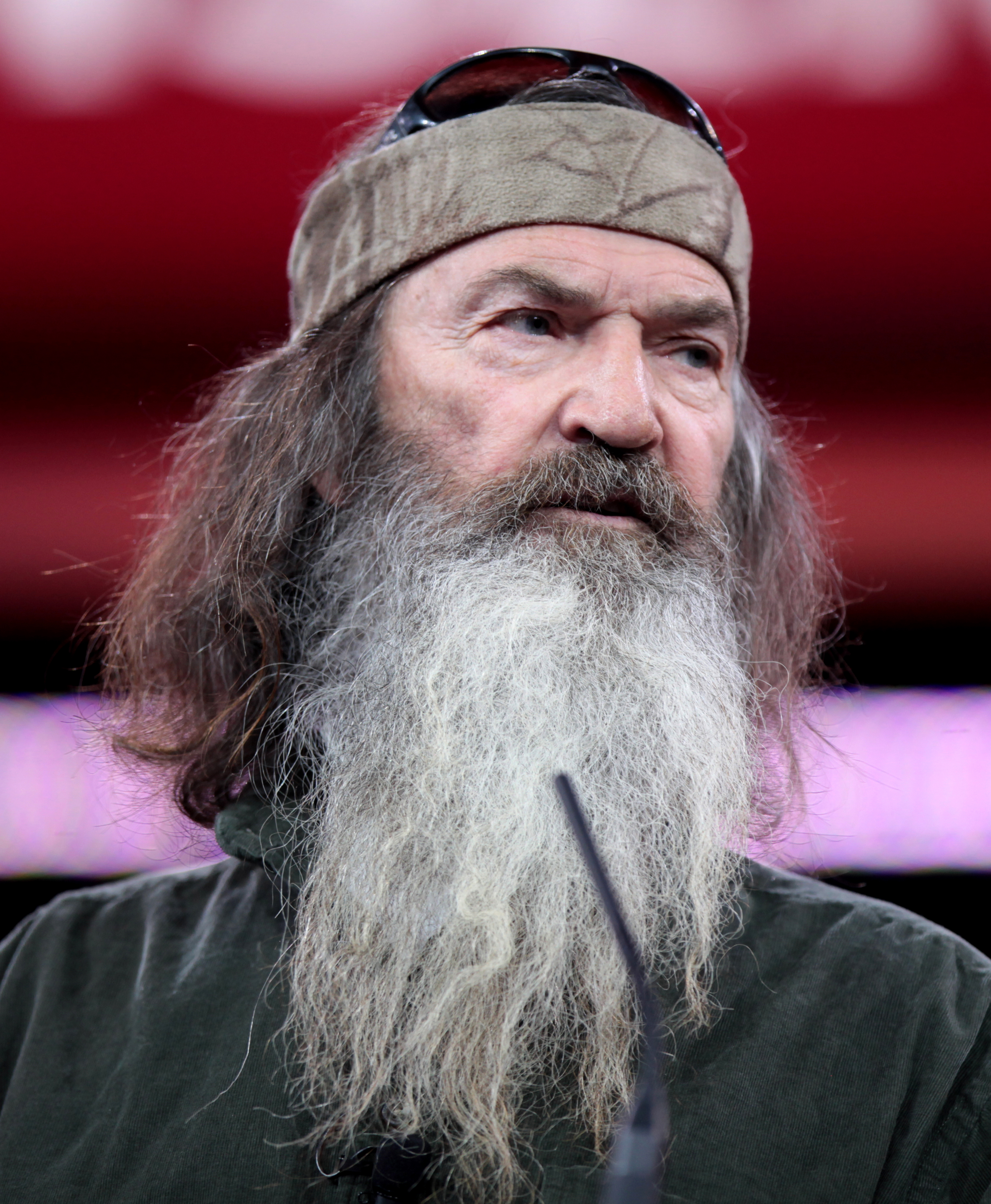
Phil Robertson, keynote speaker at the 2019 show

The following people made appearances at the GAOS:

- Clive Branson
- Bob Church
- David Clarke
- Luke Clausen
- Rick Clunn
- Tom Cole
- Julien Daguillanes
- Edwin Evers
- Greg Hackney
- Michael Iaconelli
- David Keene
- Billy Lane
- Wayne LaPierre
- Jordan Lee
- Dana Loesch
- Aaron Martens
- John Morris
- Larry Nixon
- Bob Nudd
- Cliff Pace
- Larry Pratt
- Skeet Reese
- Jase Robertson
- Phil Robertson
- Willie Robertson
- Ray Scott
- Alan Scotthorne
- Kevin VanDam
- Cody Wilson
- Jay Yevas

=== Notable exhibitors ===
- Bass Pro Shop
- Carhartt
- Dick's Sporting Goods
- Eurooptic
- Heckler & Koch
- Ford Motors
- Gander Mountain
- Magpul
- Pennsylvania Fish & Boat Commission
- Pennsylvania Game Commission
- Smith & Wesson
- Stihl

=== Sponsors ===
- Animal Planet
- National Rifle Association
- Outdoor Channel
