= Coruche (disambiguation) =

Coruche is a municipality in Santarém District in Portugal.

Coruche may also refer to:

- Coruche (Aguiar da Beira), in Guarda District, Portugal
- Coruche (wine region) in Portugal
- Coruche Biennial art exhibition

== See also ==
- Coluche, (Michel Gérard Joseph Colucci (1944–1986))
