= World Freshwater Angling Championships =

Freshwater angling competition

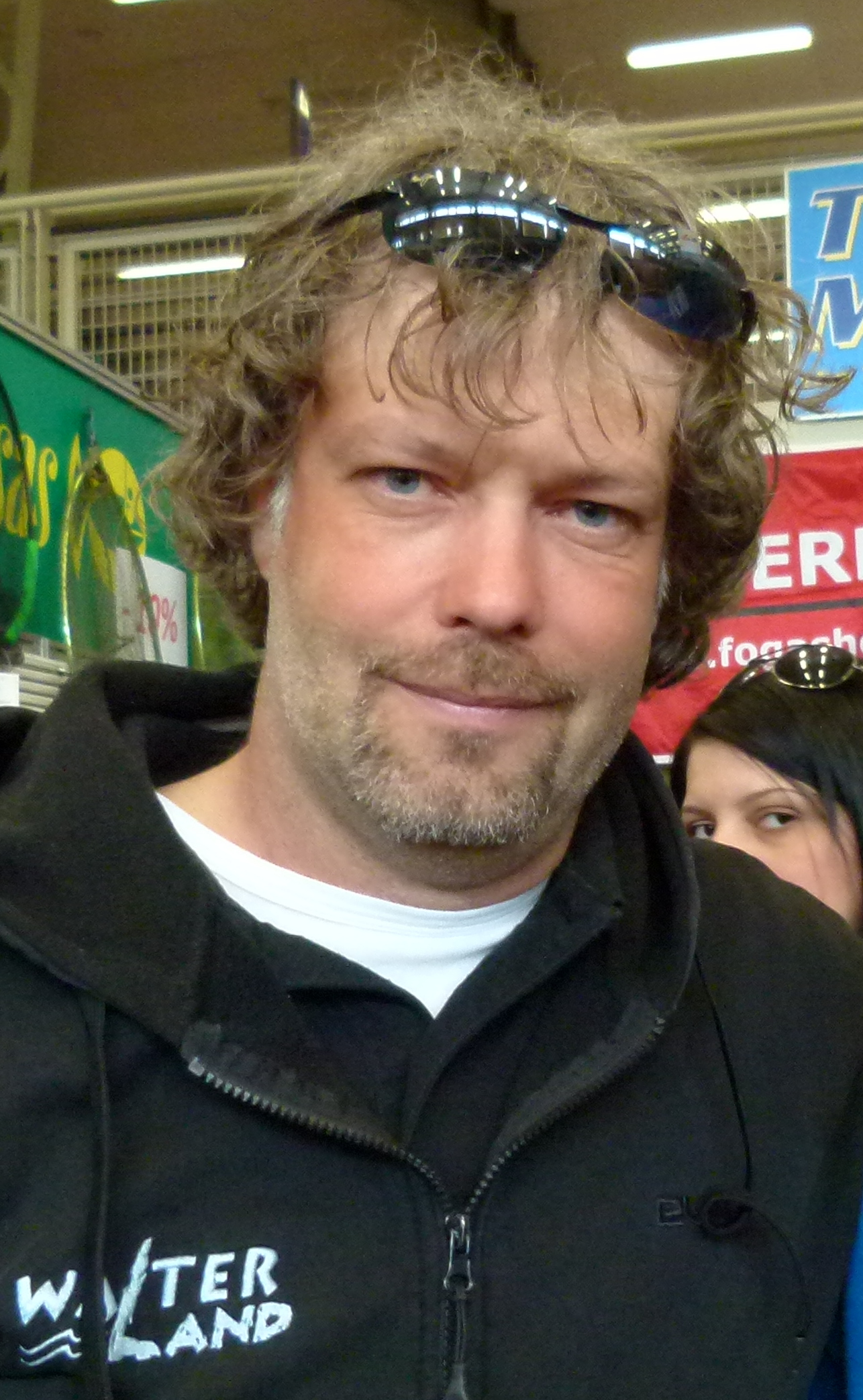
Walter Tamás – World Champion in 2004 and 2006

The World Freshwater Angling Championships is a freshwater angling competition. Participating countries fish in teams of five with titles awarded to the team with the fewest points, the competition area is split into sections and the winner with the most weight will be awarded one point, two for second, three for third, at the end of the two days the team with the least points is the top team. Since its inception in 1954, the competition has been staged on rivers, canals and still waters from a selected host nation. Currently (to 2025), the world championships have not been held outside of Europe.

The 72nd Coarse Angling World Championship for Nations was held on 5–6 September 2026 at the Sorraia River in Coruche, Portugal. England won the championship, with the Czech Republic finishing second and Hungary third. The individual world champion was José Alfonso Pardo García of Spain.

== Brief history ==
The inaugural world championship was held in West Germany in 1954 and won by team England, with the first individual title going to Gino Vigarani of Italy. In 1992, Dave Wesson, an Australian, became the only non-European to win the title. The 2020 World Freshwater Angling Championships was cancelled due to the COVID-19 pandemic but resumed in 2021. The host nation have been team champions on 15 occasions, with the strongest nation at home being Italy who have won on their own waters 6 times, the others were Belgium 2, France, Luxembourg, Romania, East Germany, West Germany, England, Spain. The host nation has produced a home grown individual world champion from just 9 events of the 67 fished (one in seven).

Individual World Champions who have won the title on more than one occasion are Alan Scotthorne with 5 wins (1996, 1997, 1998, 2003, 2007), Bob Nudd with 4 wins (1990, 1991, 1994, 1999), Robert Tesse 3 wins (1959, 1960, 1965), and 2 wins each for Dino Bassi (1971, 1976); Jean-Pierre Fougeat (1978, 1988), Rudgher Kremkus (1980, 1983), Walter Tamás (2004, 2006), and most recently, Goran Radovic (2014, 2021).

For a video history of this major angling event, see External links at the bottom of this page.

== World Championship Nations Team results ==
Year	Venue and Host Country	No. of nations	World Champions	P/Pts	Runners-up	P/Pts	3rd Place Team	P/Pts	Reference
1954	Düsseldorf, West Germany		England	50	Belgium	70	Italy	71	
1955	Reading, England		Luxembourg	69	Belgium	71	France	74	
1956	Paris, France		France	39	Belgium	64	Luxembourg	71	
1957	(Socialist Federal Republic of Yugoslavia) Belgrade, Yugoslavia		Italy	23	Luxembourg	52	France	54	
1958	Huy, Belgium		Belgium	29	France	32	Luxembourg	86	
1959	Neuchâtel, Switzerland		France	71	Italy	103	Switzerland	104	
1960	Gdańsk, Poland		Belgium	36	France	61	West Germany	87	
1961	Merseburg, East Germany		East Germany	44	Belgium	66	England	70	
1962	Lake Garda, Italy		Italy	21	France	27	Belgium	95	
1963	Wormeldange, Luxembourg		France	57	Italy	77	England	80	
1964	Isola dei Pescatori, Italy		France	6	Italy	9	Austria	20	
1965	Galați, Romania		Romania	22	Poland	27	France	32	
1966	Martham, England		France	8	Belgium	15	Italy	24	
1967	Dunaújváros, Hungary		Belgium	12	France	17	England	25	
1968	(Republic of Ireland) Fermoy, Ireland		France	18	West Germany	24	Romania	25	
1969	Bad Oldesloe, West Germany		Netherlands	17	Belgium	19	France	21	
1970	Berg, Netherlands		Belgium	8	Netherlands	14	France	16	
1971	Peschiera del Garda, Italy		Italy	6	Belgium	21	France	25	
1972	Prague, Czechoslovakia		France	12	England	24	Italy	25	
1973	Chalon-sur-Saône, France		Belgium	10	France	16	England	26	
1974	Ghent, Belgium		France	18	Italy	18	Netherlands	23	
1975	Bydgoszcz, Poland		France	23	England	26	Belgium	26	
1976	Varna, Bulgaria		Italy	7	Bulgaria	20	Austria	27	
1977	Ehnen, Luxembourg		Luxembourg	16	Belgium	18	France	19	
1978	Vienna, Austria		France	14	Italy	19	Czechoslovakia	24	
1979	Zaragoza, Spain		France	14	Netherlands	16	Portugal	25	
1980	Mannheim, West Germany		West Germany	7	England	23	Belgium	24	
1981	Luddington, England		France	25	England	31	Wales	37	
1982	Newry, Northern Ireland		Netherlands	20	France	25	England	26	
1983	Amersfoort, Netherlands		Belgium	9	England	14	Netherlands	24	
1984	Yverdon, Switzerland		Luxembourg	28	England	28	Belgium	40	
1985	Florence, Italy		England	16	Italy	17	Belgium	25	
1986	Strasbourg, France		Italy	27	West Germany	35	Austria	40	
1987	Coimbra, Portugal		England	9	Italy	18	Austria	40	
1988	Damme, Belgium		England	50	Italy	50	France	58	
1989	Plovdiv, Bulgaria		Wales	48	Italy	68	England	83	
1990	(Socialist Federal Republic of Yugoslavia) Maribor, Yugoslavia		France	60	England	89	Italy	89	
1991	Szeged, Hungary		England	44	France	48	Italy	51	
1992	Enniskillen, Northern Ireland		Italy	94	France	87	(Jersey) (Guernsey) Channel islands	120	
1993	Coruche, Portugal		Italy	49	France	68	Austria	76	
1994	Nottingham, England		England	92	France	96	Italy	117	
1995	Lappeenranta, Finland		France	23	Belgium	45	Italy	59	
1996	Peschiera del Garda, Italy		Italy	36	England	63	Austria	72	
1997	Velence, Hungary		Italy	56.5	England	70	France	72	
1998	Zagreb, Croatia		England	61	France	84	Italy	89	
1999	Toledo, Spain		Spain	34	Italy	40	England	52	
2000	Florence, Italy		Italy	37	England	59.5	Hungary	89.5	
2001	Paris, France		England	68	France	72	Italy	87	
2002	Coimbra, Portugal		Spain	52.5	Portugal	55.5	Belgium	74	
2003	Madunice, Slovakia		Hungary	55	Poland	93.5	France	102.5	
2004	Willebroek, Belgium		France	70	England	71	Hungary	79	
2005	Lappeenranta, Finland		England	64	Belgium	76	Hungary	77	
2006	Mondego River, Portugal		England	61	Italy	85	Hungary	101	
2007	Lake Velence, Hungary		Italy	57	Belgium	78	Hungary	86.5	
2008	Spinadesco Canal, Italy		England	74	San Marino	104	Italy	109	
2009	Lage Vaart Canal, Netherlands		Slovakia	39	France	40	Belgium	41	
2010	Ciudad Real, Spain		England	40	Italy	42.5	Netherlands	51	
2011	Ostellato, Italy		Italy	21	Hungary	27	Belgium	33	
2012	Morava River, Czech Republic		Poland	32	Czech Republic	44	France	47	
2013	Żerański Canal, Warsaw, Poland		England	22	France	33	Poland	39	
2014	Dubrava Canal, Croatia	37	Netherlands	38	Hungary	40.5	Serbia	45	
2015	Sava River, Slovenia		Italy	37	Czech Republic	42	England	46.5	
2016	Rowing Course, Plovdiv, Bulgaria	34	Hungary	34	Czech Republic	42	England	46	
2017	Ronquières, Belgium	38	Belgium	18	England	21	France	24.5	
2018	Montemor-o-Velho, Portugal	22	Germany	46	Hungary	52	Belgium	61	
2019	Novi Sad, Serbia		France	20	Italy	26	Hungary	32	
2020	cancelled – COVID-19 pandemic	–	–	–	–	–	–	–	
2021	Peschiera del Garda, Italy	23	Italy	75	Czech Republic	86.5	England	89	
2022	Bilje, Croatia	33	Serbia	31.5	Italy	42	Czech Republic	47	
2023	Mequinenza-Fayón, Spain	23	Serbia	45	England	54	France	70	
2024	Béthune, France	27	Croatia	31	Italy	40	France	43	
2025	Modrac Lake, Lukavac, Bosnia and Herzegovina	30	Italy	31	Croatia	31,5	France	34,5	
2026	Sorraia River, Coruche, Portugal	21	England	35	Czech Republic	43	Hungary	45	

== World Championship Individual results ==
Year	Venue and Host Country	Individual World Champion	Individual Runner-Up	Individual 3rd Place	Reference
1954	Düsseldorf, West Germany	(Italy) Gino Vigarani	(Italy) F Fugazza	(West Germany) H Andef	
1955	Reading, England	(France) M Mailly	(Belgium) Dufeys	(France) Ducret	
1956	Paris, France	(Belgium) F Cerfontaine	(France) G Dubuc	(France) Robert Tesse	
1957	(Socialist Federal Republic of Yugoslavia) Belgrade, Yugoslavia	(Italy) Giulio Mandelli	(Italy) G De Angellis	(Italy) F Fugazza	
1958	Huy, Belgium	(Belgium) J Garroit	(Belgium) F Cerfontaine	(France) A Negrignat	
1959	Neuchâtel, Switzerland	(France) Robert Tesse	(Italy) G De Angelli	(Netherlands) S Knapen	
1960	Gdańsk, Poland	(France) Robert Tesse	(Belgium) F Cerfontaine	(Belgium) F Swinnen	
1961	Merseburg, East Germany	(France) R Le Gouge	(East Germany) F Schmidt	(France) Robert Tesse	
1962	Lake Garda, Italy	(Italy) R Tedesco	(France) J Fontanet	(Italy) M Vanelli	
1963	Wormeldange, Luxembourg	(England) Billy Lane	(France) Robert Tesse	(Italy) M Vanelli	
1964	Isola dei Pescatori, Italy	(France) J Fontanet	(France) P Despres	(France) Robert Tesse	
1965	Galați, Romania	(France) Robert Tesse	(Italy) L Seppi	(England) C Burch	
1966	Martham, England	(France) Henri Guiheneuf	(Belgium) P Baudot	(Belgium) C Roelandt	
1967	Dunaújváros, Hungary	(Belgium) J Isenbaert	(West Germany) K Handt	(Belgium) G Detry	
1968	(Republic of Ireland) Fermoy, Ireland	(West Germany) G Grebenstein	(Romania) I Pana	(England) V Sherwood	
1969	Bad Oldesloe, West Germany	(England) Robin Harris	(Austria) J Leyrer	(Belgium) J Vermeulen	
1970	Berg, Netherlands	(Belgium) M Van Den Eynde	(Belgium) P Michiels	(Belgium) P Paquet	
1971	Peschiera del Garda, Italy	(Italy) Dino Bassi	(Italy) A Alfieri	(West Germany) E Zimmer	
1972	Prague, Czechoslovakia	(Netherlands) RJE Levels	(Luxembourg) A Thommas	(France) Jacques Tesse	
1973	Chalon-sur-Saône, France	(Belgium) P Michiels	(Belgium) M Van Den Eynde	(France) G Herbert	
1974	Ghent, Belgium	(West Germany) A Richter	(Spain) Mendez Gomez	(France) Jean-Pierre Fougeat	
1975	Bydgoszcz, Poland	(England) Ian Heaps	(France) Jacques Tesse	(San Marino) G De Bagi	
1976	Varna, Bulgaria	(Italy) Dino Bassi	(England) Ivan Marks	(Italy) F Pasinetti	
1977	Ehnen, Luxembourg	(Belgium) J Mainil	(Luxembourg) Poth	(Belgium) J Quinet	
1978	Vienna, Austria	(France) Jean-Pierre Fougeat	(Italy) Roberto Trabucco	(Luxembourg) N Birnbaum	
1979	Zaragoza, Spain	(France) G Heulard	(Netherlands) T Eikhout	(France) H Durozier	
1980	Mannheim, West Germany	(West Germany) R Kremkus	(West Germany) O Wessel	(Italy) Roberto Trabucco	
1981	Luddington, England	(England) David Thomas	(Portugal) V Santos	(Belgium) S Lecocq	
1982	Newry, Northern Ireland	(England) Kevin Ashurst	(United States) M Thill	(Belgium) F Bartolas	
1983	Amersfoort, Netherlands	(West Germany) R Kremkus	(Luxembourg) J Kohn	(Netherlands) P Van Gool	
1984	Yverdon, Switzerland	(Republic of Ireland) Bobby Smithers	(Scotland) R Stevens	(Netherlands) BJ Brouwer	
1985	Florence, Italy	(England) David Roper	(Italy) Roberto Trabucco	(Wales) P David	
1986	Strasbourg, France	(Netherlands) L Wever	(Wales) Clive Branson	(Netherlands) R Van Neer	
1987	Coimbra, Portugal	(Wales) Clive Branson	(England) Kevin Ashurst	(England) D White	
1988	Damme, Belgium	(France) Jean-Pierre Fougeat	(England) S Gardner	(Italy) E Colombo	
1989	Plovdiv, Bulgaria	(England) Tom Pickering	(Italy) F Casini	(Wales) R Benton	
1990	(Socialist Federal Republic of Yugoslavia) Maribor, Yugoslavia	(England) Bob Nudd	(England) Kevin Ashurst	(Luxembourg) R Koenig	
1991	Szeged, Hungary	(England) Bob Nudd	(England) Kevin Ashurst	(Netherlands) J Van Schendel	
1992	Enniskillen, Northern Ireland	(Australia) Dave Wesson	(Italy) C Guicciardi	(United States) M Thill	
1993	Coruche, Portugal	(Portugal) M Barros	(Netherlands) J Savelhoul	(France) B Bodineau	
1994	Nottingham, England	(England) Bob Nudd	(Luxembourg) R Stronck	(France) JJ Chaumet	
1995	Lappeenranta, Finland	(France) P Jean	(Belgium) J Wilmart	(France) J Desque	
1996	Peschiera del Garda, Italy	(England) Alan Scotthorne	(Italy) C Guicciardi	(Italy) E Colombo	
1997	Velence, Hungary	(England) Alan Scotthorne	(Italy) Gianluigi Sorti	(England) K Milson	
1998	Zagreb, Croatia	(England) Alan Scotthorne	(Belgium) P Carroyer	(Portugal) M Barros	
1999	Toledo, Spain	(England) Bob Nudd	(Spain) J Rodriguez Blasco	(Portugal) R Xarez	
2000	Florence, Italy	(Italy) Jacopo Falsini	(England) Will Raison	(France) Jean-Pierre Fougeat	
2001	Paris, France	(Italy) Umberto Ballabeni	(Poland) P Lorenc	(France) D Da Silva	
2002	Coimbra, Portugal	(Spain) J Rodriguez Blasco	(Spain) J Duran	(England) S Conroy	
2003	Madunice, Slovakia	(England) Alan Scotthorne	(Hungary) K Schater	(Poland) R Bednarski	
2004	Willebroek, Belgium	(Hungary) Walter Tamás	(Netherlands) E van der Hoogan	(Hungary) T Ambrus	
2005	Finland	(Belgium) Guido Nullens	(France) Stephane Pottelet	(England) Will Raison	
2006	Rio Mondego, Portugal	(Hungary) Walter Tamás	(San Marino) Ivan Biordi	(England) Sean Ashby	
2007	Lake Velence, Hungary	(England) Alan Scotthorne	(Latvia) N. Gavrobiks	(Wales) Lee Edwards	
2008	Spinadesco Canal, Italy	(England) Will Raison	(Republic of Ireland) W Wheeler	(England) Steve Gardner	
2009	Lage Vaart Canal, Netherlands	(Russia) Igor Potapov	(England) Will Raison	(Denmark) Simon Jensen	
2010	Ciudad Real, Spain	(Luxembourg) Frank Meis	(Republic of Ireland) Cathal Hughes	(Bulgaria) Rumen Vitkov	
2011	Ostellato, Italy	(Italy) Andrea Fini	(Hungary) Peter Milkovics	(Italy) Ferruccio Gabba	
2012	Morava River, Czech Republic	(England) Sean Ashby	(Russia) Sergey Fedorov	(France) Stephane Pottelet	
2013	Żerański Canal, Warsaw, Poland	(France) Didier Delannoy	(England) Steve Hemmingway	(England) Alan Scotthorne	
2014	Lake Dubrava, Croatia	(Serbia) Goran Radovic	(Netherlands) Stefan Altena	(Netherlands) Arjan Klop	
2015	Sava River, Slovenia	(Russia) Yuri Siptsov	(Hungary) Walter Tamás	(England) Alan Scotthorne	
2016	Rowing Course, Plovdiv, Bulgaria	(Slovenia) Jernej Ambrozic	(Czech Republic) Josef Konopasek	(Slovakia) Rastislav Dudr	
2017	Ronquières, Belgium	(Belgium) Luc Thijs	(France) Stephane Linder	(Belgium) Geoffrey Duquensne	
2018	Montemor-o-Velho, Portugal	(Germany) Johannes Böhm	(Belgium) Eric Di Venti	(Germany) Ralf Herdlitschke	
2019	Novi Sad, Serbia	(Croatia) Alan Perko	(France) Alexandre Caudin	(France) Maxime Duchesne	
2020	cancelled COVID-19 pandemic	–	–	–	
2021	Peschiera del Garda, Italy	(Serbia) Goran Radovic	(Hungary) Imre Szákovics	(Czech Republic) Petr Klásek	
2022	Bilje, Croatia	(Croatia) Mihael Pongrac	(Slovenia) Mitja Kmetec	(Hungary) Balázs Csöregl	
2023	Mequinenza-Fayón, Spain	(Spain) Esteve Martinez	(England) James Dent	(England) Sean Ashby	
2024	Béthune, France	(Hungary) László Csillag	(Poland) Wiktor Walczak	(Croatia) Matija Kraševac	
2025	Modrac Lake, Lukavac, Bosnia and Herzegovina	(Hungary) Nagy András	(Slovenia) Aleš Kancler	(Italy) Filippo Beltrami	
2026	Sorraia River, Coruche, Portugal	(Spain) José Alfonso Pardo García	(Netherlands) Ramon Ansing	(England) William Raison	

=== Roll of Honour ===
Team competition : France 16, Italy 14, England 14, Belgium 7, Netherlands 3, (Luxembourg) Luxemburg 3, Germany 3, Spain 2, Hungary 2, Serbia 2, Wales 1, Poland 1, Romania 1, Slovakia 1, Croatia 1

Individual multiple Champions : (England) Alan Scotthorne 5 (1996, 1997, 1998, 2003, 2007), (England) Bob Nudd 4 (1990, 1991, 1994, 1999), (France) Robert Tesse 3 (1959, 1960, 1965), (Italy) Dino Bassi 2 (1971, 1976), (France) Jean-Pierre Fougeat 2 (1978, 1988), (West Germany) Rudgher Kremkus 2 (1980, 1983), (Hungary) Walter Tamás 2 (2004, 2006), (Serbia) Goran Radovic 2 (2014, 2021).

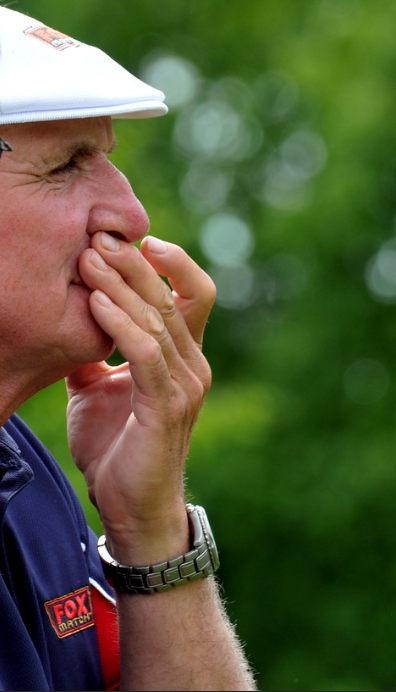
4-Time World Champion Bob Nudd (1990, 1991, 1994, 1999)

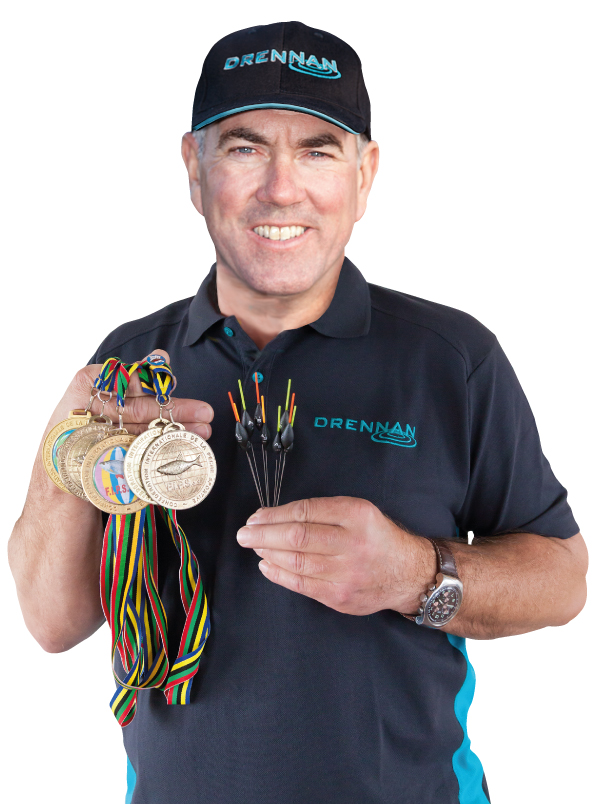
5-Time World Champion Alan Scotthorne (1996, 1997, 1998, 2003, 2007)

=== Team medal table ===
Country	(gold) Gold	(silver) Silver	(bronze) Bronze	Medals
France	16	15	14	45
Italy	14	15	10	39
England	14	13	9	36
Belgium	7	11	9	27
Netherlands	3	2	3	8
Luxembourg	3	1	2	6
Hungary	2	3	7	12
Germany	3	2	1	6
Serbia	2	0	1	3
Spain	2	0	0	2
Poland	1	1	2	4
Croatia	1	1	0	2
Wales	1	0	1	2
Romania	1	0	1	2
East Germany	1	0	0	1
Slovakia	1	0	0	1
Czech Republic	0	4	2	6
Portugal	0	1	1	2
Bulgaria	0	1	0	1
San Marino	0	1	0	1
Austria	0	0	6	6
Switzerland	0	0	1	1
(Jersey) (Guernsey) Channel Islands	0	0	1	1
Total	71	71	71	213

== Recent World Championships (2022-2025) ==
The 68th event was held in September 2022 at Bilje, Croatia. Held at Lake Biljsko Jezero which holds prussian carp, dwarf catfish, grass carp, catfish, asp, bighead, red perch, silver bream, ide and carassius. First-time world champions were Serbia, with Italy in second place and the Czech Republic in third. and the individual new world champion was Mihael Pongrac of Croatia.

The 69th World Freshwater Coarse Angling Championships was held in Mequinenza-Fayón, at the Ribarroja Dam, on the river Ebro, Spain on 9-10th September 2023. and the team event won by Serbia, for a second consecutive year, with England in second place, and France in third. The individual world championship winner was Esteve Martinez, with James Dent and Sean Ashby of England in second and third place.

The 70th World Championships was held at Béthune, France on 21–22 September 2024. First-time world champions were Croatia, with Italy in second place and France in third. The individual world championship winner was László Csillag of Hungary.

The 71st World Championships was held at Modrac Lake, Lukavac, Bosnia and Herzegovina on 6-7 September 2025. The winners were Italy, with last years winners Croatiain second place, and France once again third. The individual world championship winner was Nagy András, again from Hungary.

The 72nd Coarse Angling World Championship for Nations was held on 5–6 September 2026 at the Sorraia River in Coruche, Portugal. England won the championship, with the Czech Republic finishing second and Hungary third. The individual world champion was José Alfonso Pardo García of Spain.

== See also ==
- World Fly Fishing Championships
