= Sorraia River =

River in Santarém, Portugal

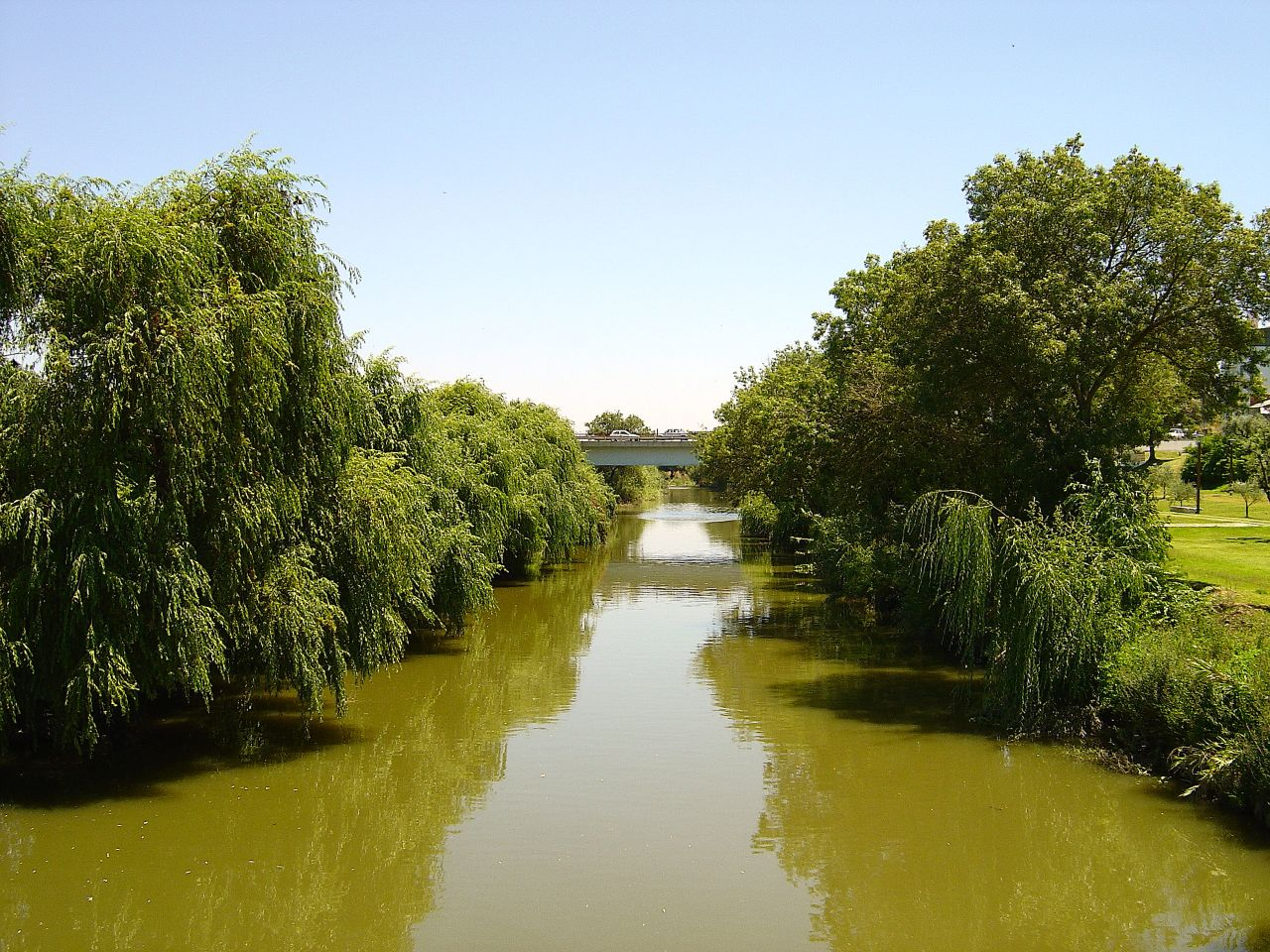
- Native name: Rio Sorraia (Portuguese)

Location
- Country: Portugal

Physical characteristics
- Source confluence
  - location: Couço, Santarém District, Portugal
  - coordinates: 39.00°N 8.31°W
- Mouth
  - location: Murteira, Santarém District, Portugal
  - coordinates: 38.83°N 8.97°W
- Length: 60 km (37 mi)
- Basin size: 7,556 km^{2} (2,917 sq mi)

Basin features
- River system: Tagus
- Tributaries
  - left: Raia, Divor, Almançor
  - right: Sor

The Sorraia River, or Rio Sorraia (European Portuguese pronunciation: [ˈʁi.u suˈʁajɐ]), is a river in Santarém District, Portugal. It forms at the confluence of the Sor and Raia, near the town of Couço. Having a basin of 7,556 square kilometres (2,917 sq mi), it flows for 60 kilometres (37 mi), joining the Tagus near Murteira. Along its length it receives the Divor, and, almost at the mouth, the Almançor.

Over time it had a vital role in the region and, according to historical records, Romans and Arabs already settled here, using it for agriculture, communication and to export the products grown on the fertile lands of the Sorraia Valley where they developed ingenious irrigation systems.

It passes the municipalities of Coruche and Benavente and until the early twentieth century was still navigable, having known a significant flow of river traffic of agricultural and forestry products, including cork oak, wood and grain.

In the second half of the twentieth century it became part of the "Plano de Irrigação do Vale do Sorraia" (Plan for Irrigation of the Sorraia Valley), aimed at making better use of water resources to boost farm income in the region.
