= Maria Rosa Viseu =

Portuguese anti-fascist (1935–2014)

- Born: 1935; Couço, Coruche, Portugal
- Died: March 2014 (aged 78–79); Couço
- Known for: Opponent of authoritarian Estado Novo Government; Political prisoner

Maria Rosa Viseu (1935–2014) was a Portuguese anti-fascist who was a member of the Portuguese Communist Party (PCP). She opposed the authoritarian Estado Novo regime in the 1960s and was a political prisoner.

== Early life ==
Maria Rosa Viseu was born in Couço in the agricultural municipality of Coruche in the Santarém District of Portugal in 1935, the eldest daughter of farming parents. She had two sisters, one of whom died in childhood, and a brother. At the age of 10 she stopped going to school, so that she could look after her siblings while her mother was working. From the age of 11 she was working on farms.

== Activism ==
In 1958, she attended a rally in support of the presidential campaign of Humberto Delgado, which led to the development of her political awareness and to her joining the Portuguese Communist Party (PCP). In the following years she took part in strikes, demonstrations and other actions in her area, including protests about the electoral fraud of 1958, which ensured that Delgado would not win the election. In 1960 she took part in a campaign for an 8-hour working day and other improved working conditions. At the time, people were working 13 or 14 hours a day. On 19 January 1961 she was detained by the National Republican Guard (GNR) and handed over to the PIDE, the Estado Novo's secret police. She was taken to Caxias prison near Lisbon, where she was subjected to interrogation with torture for a week. Following a trial in July 1961, she served a further six months in prison. After her release she continued to participate in activities by farm workers to obtain better conditions.

== After the Carnation Revolution ==
The Carnation Revolution of 25 April 1974 overthrew the Estado Novo but was followed by a period of confusion. Viseu continued to participate in agricultural workers' protests, with the aim of combatting the seasonal unemployment that left workers with no money when there was no work. She was involved in the formation of agricultural workers' cooperatives and coordinated the management of collective production units. She was elected an alternate to the central committee of the PCP and became a leader of the agricultural workers union in Santarém District.

Viseu died in Couço, in March 2014.
