= Fish Legal =

Fish Legal, based at Leominster, Herefordshire, is a not-for-profit organisation of dedicated lawyers who use the law on behalf of anglers to fight polluters and others who damage or threaten the water environment. It was founded in 1948 by Patrick Shumack, Esq. as the Anglers Cooperative Association (ACA), but changed its name in 1994 to Anglers Conservation Association.

== Current activities ==
Fish Legal fights cases on behalf of its members against perpetrators of the following: all types of water pollution, including sewage pollution (as in the case of Llyn Padarn involving pollution by Welsh Water), agricultural pollution and chemical pollution, over-abstraction, poaching, unlawful navigation, barriers to fish, such as weirs and hydropower schemes designed with inappropriate concern of anglers or fish welfare as in the case referenced here, where Fish legal were acting on behalf of the Pride of Derby & Derbyshire Angling Association to preserve fishing rights of the local weir from impoundment by developers.

Fish Legal has developed freedom of information law to allow its members and the wider public to find out what water companies in England and Wales are discharging into rivers and coastal waters. In Fish Legal and Emily Shirley v Information Commissioner, United Utilities plc, Yorkshire Water Services Ltd, Southern Water Services Ltd and the Secretary of State for the Environment, Food and Rural Affairs [2015] UKUT 0052 9AAC0 the Upper Tribunal decided that water companies were public authorities for the purposes of the Environmental Information Regulations 2004 and, as such, should disclose environmental information that they hold on request. Questions in the case were referred to the Court of Justice of the European Union (CJEU), in order to determine the correct implementation of the Environmental Information Directive. The CJEU ruling (case C-279/12) stated that the water companies provide "public services relating to the environment" under the control of a public body and therefore should be treated as "public bodies" for the purposes of all the environmental information they hold. Their obligation to provide environmental information to the public is limited to information related to the public services which they provide in the environmental field. The Information Commissioner published new guidance on the regulations as a result of the case.

In 2015, Fish Legal joined with the Angling Trust and WWF UK in a judicial review of Defra and the Environment Agency for their lack of use of Water Protection Zones to protect fisheries from agricultural pollution.

In Scotland, Fish Legal has worked with Scottish charity the Sustainable Inshore Fisheries Trust (SIFT) to develop an ‘Aquaculture Toolkit’ to help communities to better police salmon farms to make sure they do not cause damage to local wild salmon and sea trout populations.

== Formation of the Angling Trust ==
After two years of discussion in 2009, six angling organisations merged to create the Angling Trust. These were the Anglers Conservation Association (now Fish Legal), Fisheries and Angling Conservation Trust (FACT), National Association of Fisheries and Angling Consultatives (NAFAC), National Federation of Anglers (NFA), National Federation of Sea Anglers (NFSA), and the Specialist Anglers' Alliance (SAA). The Salmon & Trout Association (S&TA) pulled out of the merger consultations because they wished to keep their charitable status and charities are not allowed to merge under the Laws of England and Wales.

== See also ==
- List of waterway societies in the United Kingdom
