= Eastern Sports and Outdoor Show =

- Status: Defunct
- Genre: Outdoor, Sportsman, Hunting
- Frequency: Annual
- Venue: Pennsylvania Farm Show Complex & Expo Center
- Location: Harrisburg, Pennsylvania
- Years active: 1956–2013

The Eastern Sports and Outdoor Show was an outdoor hunting and fishing exposition held at the Pennsylvania Farm Show Complex & Expo Center in Harrisburg, Pennsylvania which ran annually from 1956 to 2013. It primarily showcased hunting and fishing products, sporting equipment, and services, alongside expert advice, seminars, and competition shooting. Often described as the largest show of its kind in North America, it included more than 1,000 hunting and fishing related vendors and over 500 outfitters from around the world.

== History ==
The event was originally a six-day event called the "Pennsylvania Recreation and Sportsmen's Show" and was first held in March 1956. In 1962, the show was expanded to eight days and renamed the "Pennsylvania Sports and Outdoor Show".

== Cancellation ==
On January 15, 2013 Reed Exhibitions, the promoter of the show, announced that modern sporting rifles (MSRs) and related products would not be permitted at the show. Following the announcement, hundreds of its exhibitors and most of its celebrity speakers cancelled. Following opposition by the National Rifle Association of America (NRA), and a statement by the National Shooting Sports Foundation (NSSF) that they would stop co-organizing with Reed for their annual SHOT Show, Reed announced the indefinite postponement of the ESOS, which would later be cancelled.

Tourism officials for the Hershey and Harrisburg Region of Pennsylvania said that the postponement and eventual cancellation of the ESOS in 2013 resulted in an estimated $80 million loss to the local economy. Officials with the Hershey Harrisburg Regional Visitors Bureau reported $44 million of that loss was in direct spending from the 1,000 vendors and estimated 250,000 visitors attending the show each year. Regional hotels reported the event accounted for approximately 12,000 room-nights during what was typically a slow period for occupancy.

The National Rifle Association was chosen over 16 other applicants to replace the show starting in 2014 with a new event at the Pennsylvania Farm Show Complex called the Great American Outdoor Show.
