= Angling Trust =

Angling governing body

The Angling Trust, based at Leominster, Herefordshire, is an organisation formed from the merger of six angling authorities to form a single and more powerful non-profit organisation for the benefit of anglers. The body oversees the development of angling for three disciplines — coarse, sea, and game fishing. The Angling Trust was set up to promote anglers' rights, fish conservation, preservation of habitat and fish and angler welfare.

== Formation of the Angling Trust ==
In 2009, after two years of discussion, six Angling organisations merged to create the Angling Trust: the Anglers' Conservation Association (now Fish Legal), the Fisheries and Angling Conservation Trust (FACT), the National Association of Fisheries and Angling Consultatives (NAFAC), the National Federation of Anglers (NFA), the National Federation of Sea Anglers (NFSA), and the Specialist Anglers' Alliance (SAA).

The Salmon & Trout Association (S&TA) pulled out of the merger consultations owing to wishing to keep its charitable status: under the law of England and Wales, charities are not allowed to merge. The Angling Development Board merged with the Angling Trust in 2012.

== Aims and objectives ==
The Angling Trust organizes and strategizes activities towards achieving conservation of fish populations and habitat, protection of angling and anglers, increasing government and EA support and funding for angling and fisheries, assists control of nuisance predators, campaigns to prevent poaching and theft of fish, protects angler's rights, provides education and coaching to anglers and the wider community, supports diversity and angling club development. The trust fights Pollution, litter, over-abstraction of fish, commercial overfishing, harmful barrages, weirs and hydropower schemes, unlawful navigation, spread of diseases and parasites, access restrictions and anti-angling campaigns.

In November 2023, the Angling Trust implemented a ban on trans women from competing in the women's category, citing concerns over trans women having an unfair advantage at fishing.

== International Competitions ==
The Angling Trust, is the national governing body of England for competition angling with affiliation to Confédération Internationale de la Pêche Sportive (CIPS), Angling's world governing body. The England team takes part in most of the FIPSed, FIPSmer, FIPSmouche and FIPScasting organised championships. International FIPSed (Federation International De La Peche Sportive en eau douce)(English: International Fresh Water Sport Fishing Federation) competitions include World Coarse Angling Championships for Carp, Carnivorous Boats, masters, ladies, feeder, veterans, disabled, European, clubs, youth and nations.

== British Record (Rod Caught) Fish Committee ==
The Angling Trust incorporates the British Record (Rod Caught) Fish Committee which oversees and adjudicates the British Record Fish list for saltwater, game and freshwater fish caught by rod and line method.

== Fish Legal ==
Fish Legal represents the Angling Trust in cases brought against polluters, those who contribute to the problem of litter, over-abstraction, commercial overfishing, habitat degradation, poaching, fish theft, unlawful navigation, the erection of barriers such as weirs, and hydropower schemes designed with inappropriate concern for anglers or fish welfare. One case in which the body has acted was on behalf of the Pride of Derby & Derbyshire Angling Association to preserve fishing rights in the local weir from developers.

== Board ==
In 2020, Neville Fickling joined the board of the Angling Trust, he has held three British records, for the zander twice in 1971 at 12lb 6oz 8dr, and later the same year at 12lb 13oz. In 1985, he landed the British record pike of 41 lb 6 oz in Feb 1985, on the River Thurne.

== See also ==
- List of waterway societies in the United Kingdom
