= Confédération Internationale de la Pêche Sportive =

Organization

International Sport Fishing Confederation Confédération Internationale de la Pêche
- Abbreviation: CIPS
- Formation: February 22, 1952; 74 years ago
- Type: Sports federation
- Legal status: association déclarée incorporated in Italy
- Purpose: peak body for angling sports
- Headquarters: Rome, Italy
- Location: Viale Tiziano 70, 00196 Rome, Italy
- Region served: International
- Members: National Federations
- Official language: French and English
- President: Ugo Matteoli
- Main organ: Congress
- Affiliations: SportAccord
- Website: www.cips-fips.com

The International Sport Fishing Confederation (French: Confédération Internationale de la Pêche Sportive, CIPS) was founded in 1952 is the international sport federation representing a number of international federations concerned with angling sports (Recreational fishing or Sport Fishing) that are carried out in fresh or seawater environments, fly fishing and with casting sport.

== Organisation ==
CIPS was founded in Rome, Italy on 22 February 1952.

The CIPS is a confederation of the following international federations:

1. Fédération Internationale de la Pêche Sportive en Eau Douce (FIPS-ED or FIPSed) (English: International Fresh Water Sport Fishing Federation),
2. Fédération Internationale de la Pêche Sportive a la Mouche (FIPS-Mouche) (English: International Fly Sport Fishing Federation),
3. Fédération Internationale de la Pêche Sportive en Mer (FIPS-MER) (English: International Sea Sport Fishing Federation) and
4. Fédération Internationale du Lancer (ICSF) (English: International Casting Sport Federation).

CIPS via its constituent international federations is reported as representing 115 National Federations who in turn represent a total of 50 million individual members. CIPS headquarters are located in Rome, Italy where its day-to-day operations are conducted. World and continental championships are directly organised by its international federations.

== Events ==
- World Freshwater Angling Championships - 1954
- World Fly Fishing Championships - 1981

== Members ==
FIPSed (International Federation of Sport Freshwater Fishing) have 69 nations in December 2025.

== Kindred organisations ==
CIPS is the predecessor of Confédération Mondiale des Activités Subaquatiques (CMAS) in respect to spearfishing. CMAS was founded in 1959 by national federations which at the time were members of the Comité des Sports Sous-Marins (Underwater Sports Committee) of CIPS.

== Recognition ==
CIPS is a member of SportAccord. It is also one of the international sports federations that has agreed to comply with the World Anti-Doping Code which is overseen by the World Anti-Doping Agency.

== Controversies ==
In 2023, the CIPS enacted a ban on trans women from competing in the women's competition category, citing a perceived physical advantage at fishing. This decision was lambasted by some as 'absolutely discriminatory', while gender critical advocates hailed it as a victory for future generations.
