= Pennsylvania Farm Show =

State fair of Pennsylvania, United States

Coordinates: 40°17′12.27″N 76°52′59.25″W

- Genre: Agricultural exposition
- Dates: 10–17 January 2026
- Frequency: Annually
- Venue: Pennsylvania Farm Show Complex & Expo Center
- Locations: Harrisburg, Pennsylvania, U.S.
- Years active: 1917, 1919–1941, since 1946
- Organizer: Pennsylvania Department of Agriculture
- Website: Farm Show Website

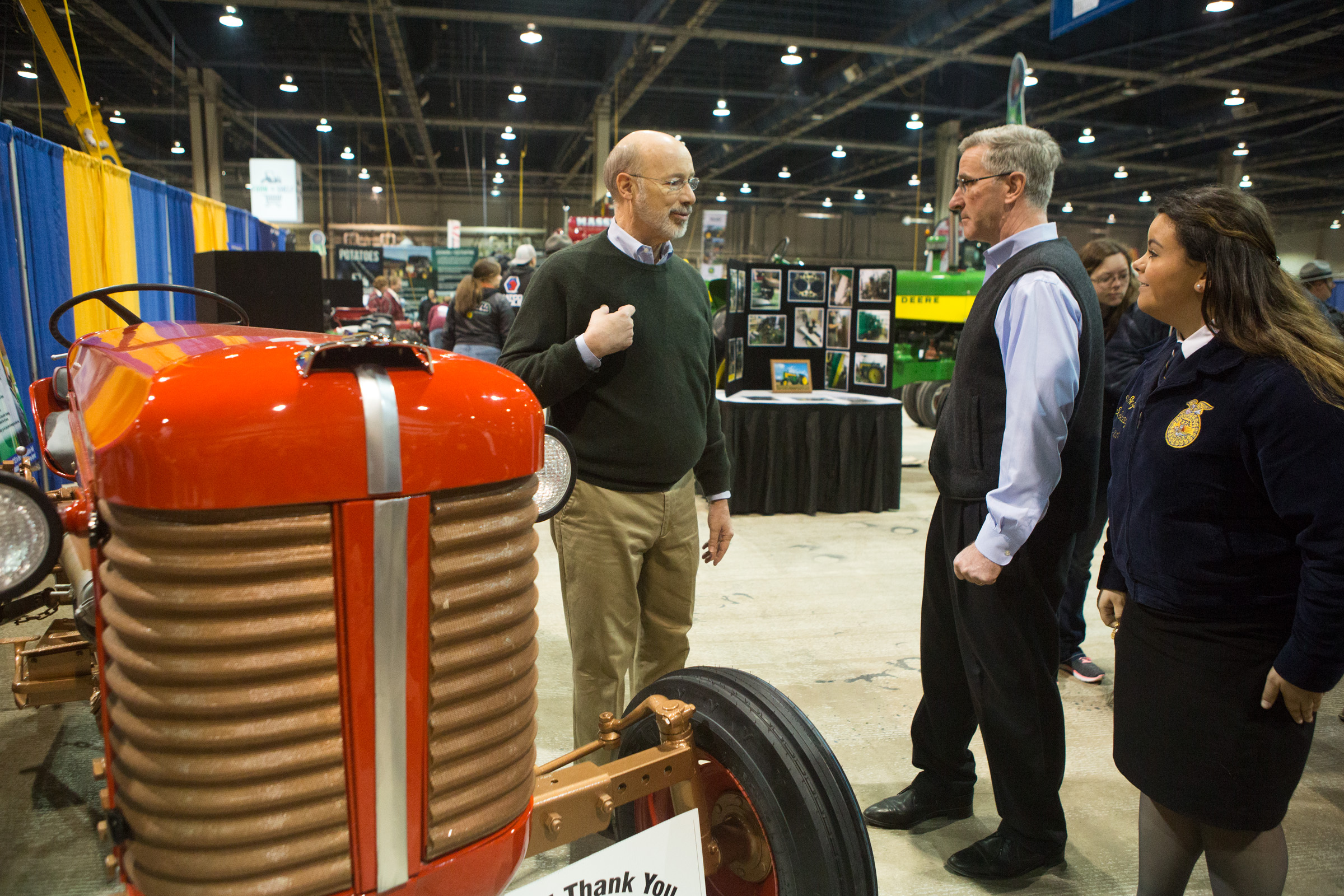
Governor Tom Wolf attending the Pennsylvania Farm Show, January 2017

The Pennsylvania Farm Show is an annual agricultural exposition celebrating Pennsylvania's agriculture industry, held every January at the Pennsylvania Farm Show Complex & Expo Center, located in Harrisburg, Pennsylvania. It is the largest indoor agricultural event held in the United States. The Farm Show Complex houses 24 acres (97,000 m^{2}) under its roof, spread throughout eleven halls, including three arenas. The annual event is free to the public and attracts over half a million visitors. This event was first held in 1917 as Pennsylvania's State Fair. The 2021 rendition of the Farm Show, however, was entirely virtual for the first time in its history due to the COVID-19 pandemic.

The Farm Show has over 10,000 competitive events spread over 35 departments. (Note: Competitive event departments: Draft Horses; Sheep; Wool; Swine; Beef Cattle; Junior Market Livestock; Dairy Cattle; Dairy Goats; Poultry; Alpacas; Meat Goats; Corn; Small Grains; Hay & Straw; Cheese; Potatoes; Fruit; Edible Nuts; Vegetables; Mushrooms; Maple Syrup Products; Apiary Products; Christmas Trees & Wreaths; Family Living; Square Dance; Ag Ed Demonstrations; Ag Ed Window Exhibits; Ag Ed Horticulture; Ag Ed Landscape; Ag Ed Agriscience Fair; Rabbits; Commercial Wine; Hard Cider; Beer; Antique Tractor Restoration.) All exhibits are owned, grown, or fashioned by residents of Pennsylvania.

In addition to these events, the Farm Show offers hands-on learning activities such as lace making, wheat weaving, and blacksmithing. The Farm Show also features a portable merry-go-round carnival ride that was manufactured by the Allan Herschell Company in 1946. Antique agricultural equipment is often displayed at the show, alongside new farming technology.

== See also ==
- Agriculture in Pennsylvania
- Agricultural show
- Horse show
- Livestock show
