= Alan Scotthorne =

Alan Scotthorne MBE is the first angler to win five individual World Freshwater Angling Championships, (1996, 1997, 1998, 2003, 2007), has won the team world championships with England on eight occasions between 1994 and 2013, making him the most successful international angler in history.

He was appointed a Member of the Order of the British Empire (MBE) in the 1999 Birthday Honours for services to Angling.

== Internationals ==
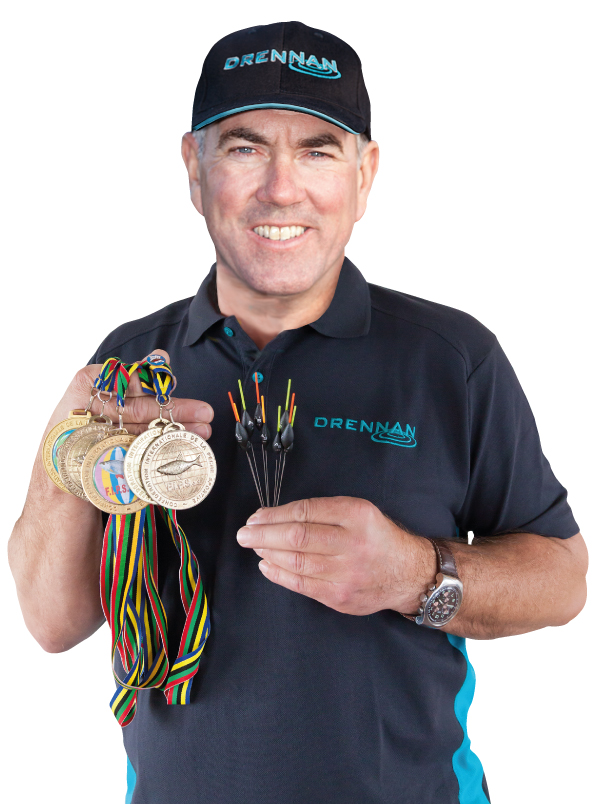
Alan Scotthorne

Scotthorne represented the England team at international level since 1993, during which time he has won the "team" world title with "Team England" on eight occasions between 1994, and 2013).

He has been individual World Champion on a record 5 occasions, making him the most successful international angler in history, surpassing the record of 4 wins previously held by fellow England teammate Bob Nudd. Scotthorne's world titles were won at the following tournaments:

- 1996 Peschiera del Garda, Italy
- 1997 Velence, Hungary
- 1998 Zagreb, Croatia
- 2003 Madunice, Slovakia
- 2007 Lake Velence, Hungary

IN 2008 Scotthorne was presented with a Lifetime achievement award by the National Federation of Anglers (NFA) for his achievements in angling. Scotthorne continued his place in the England team for the 2016 World Freshwater Angling Championships in Plovdiv, Bulgaria.

== Early life ==
From a very young age, one of the venues Scotthorne would fish matches was on the Stainforth and Keadby Canal at Thorne, South Yorkshire, taking every possible tactical detail into account to catch winning bags of roach and bream.

== Achievements ==
- Individual World Champion 5 times (1996, 1997, 1998, 2003, 2007.
- Team World Championship winners with "England" on eight occasions (1994, 1998, 2001, 2005, 2006, 2008, 2010 and 2013)
- European Champion
- UK Champion
- Evesham Festival Wychavon Champion (twice)
- Rive Cup Champion
- White Acres Festival winner
