= World Fly Fishing Championships =

International sporting championships for fly fishing

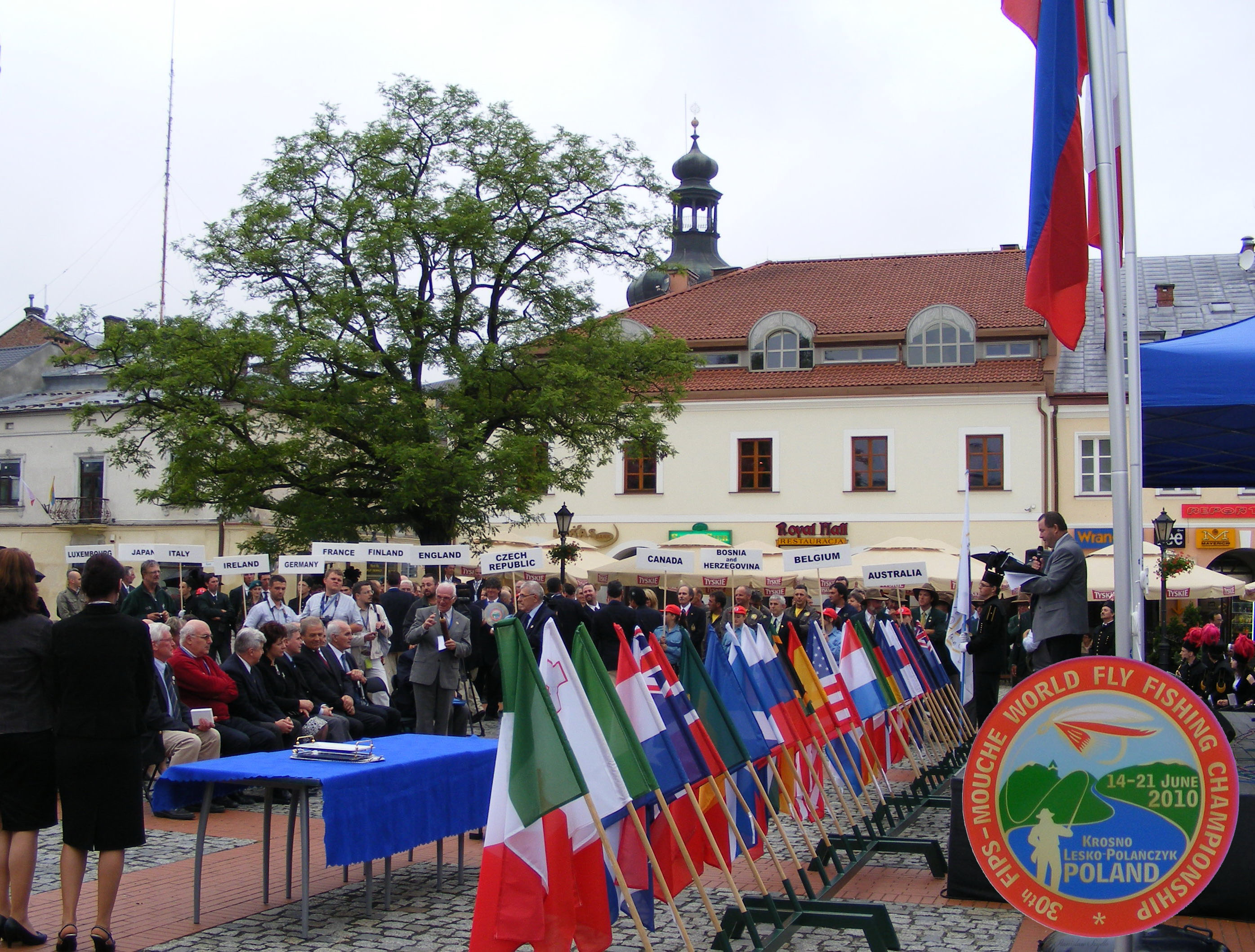
- 30th FIPS-Mouche World Fly Fishing Championship Krosno Poland 2010
- Highest governing body: Fédération Internationale de Peche Sportive Mouche
- First played: 1981

The World Fly Fishing Championship is organised by the Confédération Internationale de la Pêche Sportive (FIPS Mouche) and takes place annually since 1981 between 30 teams of six individuals per country over five sessions. The WFFCs consist of four separate categories: the Youth Division, the Senior Division, the Masters Division and the Women's Division.

== FIPS Mouche ==
FIPS Mouche is an abbreviation of "Fédération Internationale de Peche Sportive Mouche" (in English, the "International Fly Fishing Federation"), which is the fly fishing arm of CIPS (Confédération Internationale de la Pêche Sportive), founded in Rome in 1952, the world regulating body for many different disciplines of fishing. FIPS Mouche hand over the management responsibility for the organisation of upcoming FIPS Mouche event, in its entirety to selected host nation's fly-fishing governing body. The host nation is to ensure health and safety welfare, promotion, sponsorship and media arrangements, meet financial requirements and selection of suitable venues.

== Rules ==
Six rounds with a duration of three hours of fly fishing are fished at five different geographical locations (sectors), a mixture of lakes and rivers to test all skills, as chosen by the host nation beforehand for its abundant trout and game fish populations. All fish caught will be measured for length, rather than weight and are returned to the water alive. Points are awarded to the most successful anglers and section points per round according to placing, with the winner receiving one point; the lowest overall score wins.

== History ==
The first ever Seniors WFFC was held in Luxembourg in 1981 and won by team Netherlands, that winning team also produced the first ever individual world champion who was Cor Wittkamp. Three years later in 1984, the 4th WFFC held in Spain was won by first class cricketer and footballer Tony Pawson of England, Although his team England were just beaten to the title by Italy. Four years later in 1988 at the 8th WFFC in Australia the Individual world champion was John Pawson of England, son of Tony who won in 1984. Pascal Cognard of France became the first angler to win the individual world championship three times when he won the 20th WFFC in England in 2000, having previously succeeded in Norway in 1994 and in the United States in 1997. The Czech Republic set the standard in 2014 at their home water, having won the team tournament a record 10 times. The World Fly Fishing Championship Team event has been won by the host nation on just 10 of the 40 occasions that the tournament has taken place (to 2021), a one in four chance.

== Results for all team divisions ==
Youth Team Results

WFFC	Host nation	Year	Champion	Runner up	3rd place
13th WFFC	(Republic of Ireland) Ireland	2026	U24: (Republic of Ireland) Ireland U19: (Republic of Ireland) Ireland	U24: (United States) United States U19: None	U24: (Czech Republic) Czech Republic U19: None
12th WFFC	United States	2025	United States	Poland	South Africa
11th WFFC	Czech Republic	2024	United States	Poland	Czech Republic
10th WFFC	(Bosnia and Herzegovina) Bosnia and Hz	2023	United States	France	Slovakia
9th WFFC	Italy	2022	Spain	Czech Republic	France
8th WFFC	Czech Republic	2019	Czech Republic	United States	Spain
7th WFFC	Poland	2018	Poland	Spain	Czech Republic
6th WFFC	Slovenia	2017	France	Poland	United States
5th WFFC	Spain	2016	France	United States	Czech Republic
4th WFFC	United States	2015	United States	Poland	Czech Republic
3rd WFFC	Poland	2014	United States	Poland	Czech Republic
2nd WFFC	(Republic of Ireland) Ireland	2013	United States	(Republic of Ireland) Ireland	South Africa
1st WFFC	France	2012	Czech Republic	United States	France

Masters Team Results

WFFC	Host nation	Year	Champion	Runner up	3rd place	4th place	5th place
11th WFFC	Norway	2026	Spain	Italy	France	United States	
10th WFFC	Spain	2025	Spain	France	Italy		
9th WFFC	Czech Republic	2024	Italy	Spain	Czech Republic	France	United States
8th WFFC	Canada	2023	Spain	United States	Czech Republic	Canada	(Republic of Ireland) Ireland
7th WFFC	Italy	2022	United States	Italy	Belgium		
6th WFFC	Czech Republic	2021	Czech Republic	Italy	Spain	United States	Belgium
5th WFFC	South Africa	2019	Spain	United States	Italy		
4th WFFC	Spain	2018	Spain	Italy	France	United States	
3rd WFFC	Portugal	2017	Italy	France	United States		
2nd WFFC	(Republic of Ireland) Ireland	2016	Italy	Scotland	(Republic of Ireland) Ireland	United States	
1st WFFC	Chile	2014	Italy	Czech Republic	Chile		

Masters Individual Results

WFFC	Host nation	Year	Champion	Runner up	3rd place	4th place	5th place
11th WFFC	Norway	2026	(Spain) Jordi Oliveras Cortina	(France) Francois Deloup	(United States) Pat Weiss		
10th WFFC	Spain	2025	(Spain) Juan Jose De La Fuente	(Spain) Jose Manuel Socastro Gens	(United States) Pat Weiss		
9th WFFC	Czech Republic	2024	(Italy) V Santi Amantini	(Czech Republic) Borek Kopecky	(Czech Republic) Marek Macka	(Italy) V Carlo Sciagurii	(France) Francois Deloup
8th WFFC	Canada	2023	(United States) Pete Erickson	(Canada) Mike Learmonth	(Spain) Jordi Oliveras	(England) Tony Baldwin	(Canada) John Nishi
7th WFFC	Italy	2022	(United States) Bret Bishop	(Republic of Ireland) Michael Twohig	(Netherlands) Rene Koops		
6th WFFC	Czech Republic	2021	(Czechoslovakia) Karel Sklenar	(Spain) Jaun Bautista	(United States) Bret Bishop		
5th WFFC	South Africa	2019	(South Africa) Richard Goriel	(Spain) J Alvares	(Republic of Ireland) Michael Twohig		
4th WFFC	Spain	2018	(Spain) I. Ferreras	(France) Jean Meya	(Italy) Armando di Giacomo		
3rd WFFC	Portugal	2017	(Italy) Edgardo Dona	(France) Jean Meya	(Italy) Massimo Clini		
2nd WFFC	(Republic of Ireland) Ireland	2016	(Republic of Ireland) Jacky Coyne	(Italy) Edgardo Ferrero	(Scotland) Mike Cordiner		
1st WFFC	Chile	2014	(Netherlands) Rene Koops		(Italy) V Santi Amantini		

Senior Team results

Nation	Titles
France	12
Czech Republic	9
Italy	6
England	5
Spain	4
Poland	2
Czechoslovakia	1
Slovakia	1
Australia	1
New Zealand	1
Finland	1
Netherlands	1
United States	1

Event	Host nation	Year	No. of nations	Champion	Runner up	3rd place	4th place	5th place
45th WFFC	United States, Idaho Falls	2026	21	United States	France	Belgium	Poland	Spain
44th WFFC	Czech Republic	2025	31	France	Poland	United States	Czech Republic	Slovakia
43rd WFFC	Font Romeu, France	2024	21	France	Spain	United States	Czech Republic	Australia
42nd WFFC	Slovakia	2023	28	France	Czech Republic	Spain	Italy	Poland
41st WFFC	Spain	2022	22	Spain	France	Czech Republic	Belgium	Finland
40th WFFC	Finland	2021	13	Finland	France	Spain	Slovakia	Italy
39th WFFC	Australia	2019	23	France	Czech Republic	Spain	Finland	Italy
38th WFFC	Italy	2018	28	Spain	Czech Republic	Italy	United States	Finland
37th WFFC	Slovakia	2017	29	France	Czech Republic	Spain	Slovakia	Australia
36th WFFC	United States	2016	22	Spain	France	United States	Czech Republic	Slovakia
35th WFFC	(Bosnia and Herzegovina) Bosnia and Hz	2015	27	Spain	United States	(Bosnia and Herzegovina) Bosnia and Hz	France	Slovenia
34th WFFC	Czech Republic	2014		Czech Republic	France	England	Finland	United States
33rd WFFC	Norway	2013		Czech Republic	Italy	France	Finland	United States
32nd WFFC	Slovenia	2012		Czech Republic	Italy	Spain	France	Slovakia
31st WFFC	Italy	2011		Italy	Czech Republic	Poland	Spain	United States
30th WFFC	Poland	2010		Czech Republic	France	Slovakia	Poland	South Africa
29th WFFC	Scotland	2009	23	England	France	Scotland	Finland	Wales
28th WFFC	New Zealand	2008		Czech Republic	New Zealand	France	Poland	Italy
27th WFFC	Finland	2007		France	Czech Republic	Finland	Portugal	Spain
26th WFFC	Portugal	2006		Czech Republic	France	Spain	Italy	Portugal
25th WFFC	Sweden	2005		France	Finland	Czech Republic	-	-
24th WFFC	Slovakia	2004		Slovakia	Czech Republic	France	Poland	Belgium
23rd WFFC	Spain	2003		France	Belgium	Spain	-	-
22nd WFFC	France	2002		France	Belgium	Spain	-	-
21st WFFC	Sweden	2001		France	Finland	Czech Republic	England	Poland
20th WFFC	England	2000		France	Wales	Australia	-	-
19th WFFC	Australia	1999		Australia	France	New Zealand	Spain	England
18th WFFC	Poland	1998		Czech Republic	Poland	England	Italy	Slovakia
17th WFFC	United States	1997		France	Belgium	Italy	-	-
16th WFFC	Czech Republic	1996		Czech Republic	France	Poland	-	-
15th WFFC	(Republic of Ireland) Ireland	1995		England	Wales	Belgium	-	-
14th WFFC	Norway	1994		Czech Republic	Italy	England	-	-
13th WFFC	Canada	1993		England	Poland	Italy	Wales	Czechoslovakia
12th WFFC	Italy	1992		Italy	Belgium	France	-	-
11th WFFC	New Zealand	1991		New Zealand	Poland	England	?	
10th WFFC	Wales	1990		Czechoslovakia	Poland	Belgium	France	England
9th WFFC	Finland	1989		Poland	France	Finland	-	-
8th WFFC	Australia	1988		England	France	Australia	New Zealand	Scotland
7th WFFC	England	1987		England	Australia	New Zealand	Wales	Poland
6th WFFC	Belgium	1986		Italy	Belgium	Czechoslovakia	-	-
5th WFFC	Poland	1985		Poland	Czechoslovakia	France	-	-
4th WFFC	Spain	1984		Italy	England	France	-	-
3rd WFFC	Italy	1983		Italy	Belgium	Netherlands	-	-
2nd WFFC	Spain	1982		Italy	Spain	(Luxembourg) Luxemburg	-	-
1st WFFC	Luxembourg	1981		Netherlands	(Luxembourg) Luxemburg	Belgium	-	-

Senior Individual results

WFFC	Host nation	Year	Champion	Runner up	3rd place	4th place	5th place	Ref.
45th	United States, Idaho Falls	2026	(United States) Michael Bradley	(Spain) David Arcay	(France) Gregoire Juglaret	(Belgium) Mathias Briquemont	(Spain) Ander Perez Larruskain	
44th	Czech Republic	2025	(France) Pierre Kuntz	(France) Gregoire Juglaret	(United States) Michael Bradley	(Belgium) Mathias Briquemont	(Czech Republic) Lukas Starychfojtu	
43rd	Font Romeu, France	2024	(France) Pierre Kuntz	(France) Sebastian Delcor	(France) Gregoire Juglaret	(United States) Michael Bradley	(Spain) Andres Torres	
42nd	Slovakia	2023	(France) Pierre Kuntz	(Spain) David Arcay Fernandez	(France) Grégoire Juglaret	(Australia) Tom Jarman	(Czech Republic) David Chlumsky	
41st	Spain	2022	(France) Julien Daguillanes	(Spain) David Arcay Fernandez	(Spain) Ruben Santos	(Czech Republic) David Chlumsky	(Belgium) Julien Lorquet	
40th	Finland	2021	(Finland) Heikki Kurtti	(Finland) Jari Heikkinen	(Spain) David Arcay Fernandez	(Finland) Santeri Kinnunen	(Finland) Mikko Rasanen	
39th	Australia	2019	(England) Howard Croston	(Spain) D García Ferreras	(Slovakia) Kristian Sveda	(France) Sebastian Delcor	(Italy) V Santi Amantini	
38th	Italy	2018	(Spain) D García Ferreras	(Finland) Jyrki Hiltunen	(Italy) Andrea Pirone	(Czech Republic) František Kouba	(Spain) J Oliveras Cortina	
37th	Slovakia	2017	(Czech Republic) Antonin Pešek	(France) Grégoire Juglaret	(France) Sebastian Delcor	(France) Julien Daguillanes	(Spain) Iván Vergé	
36th	United States	2016	(France) Julien Daguillanes	(Spain) J Oliveras Cortina	(United States) Lance Egan	(United States) Pat Weiss	(Czech Republic) Roman Heimlich	
35th	(Bosnia and Herzegovina) Bosnia and Hz	2015	(Poland) Piotr Marchewka	(Montenegro) Nikola Trebjesant	(United States) Devin Olsen	(Spain) D Arcay Fernandez	(France) Sebastian Delcor	
34th	Czech Republic	2014	(Czech Republic) Luboš Roza	(Poland) Piotr Armatys	(England) Andrew Scott	(Slovakia) Peter Alexovic	(France) J-G Mathieu	
33rd	Norway	2013	(Italy) V Santi Amantini	(Czech Republic) Martin Drož	(Belgium) Julien Lorquet	(Czech Republic) Antonin Pešek	(France) Sebastian Delcor	
32nd	Slovenia	2012	(Spain) D Arcay Fernandez	(Italy) V Santi Amantini	(Czech Republic) Tomáš Adam	(England) Howard Croston	(Czech Republic) Antonin Pesek	
31st	Italy	2011	(Italy) V Santi Amantini	(Italy) Stefano Cominazzini	(Czech Republic) Roman Heimlich	(Spain) Pablo Castro Pinos	(Republic of Ireland) Thomas Drinan	
30th	Poland	2010	(Czech Republic) Pavel Chyba	(Czech Republic) Tomáš Adam	(England) John Horsey	(France) Julien Daguillanes	(Italy) Sandro Soldarini	
29th	Scotland	2009	(England) Iain Barr	(Canada) Donald Thom	(Belgium) Christian Jadouille	(France) Yann Caleri	(Scotland) Calum Crosbie	
28th	New Zealand	2008	(Czech Republic) Martin Drož	(France) Julien Daguillanes	(Czech Republic) Tomas Starychfojtu	(England) John Horsey	(Poland) Lucjan Burda	
27th	Finland	2007	(Poland) Marek Walczyk	(France) Eric Lelouvier	(Czech Republic) Antonin Pešek	(France) Bertrand Jacquemin	(France) Yann Caleri	
26th	Portugal	2006	(Czech Republic) Antonin Pešek	(Spain) Jonathan Torralbo Ruiz	(Czech Republic) Martin Drož	-	-	
25th	Sweden	2005	(France) Bertrand Jacquemin	(Italy) Massimo Valsesia	(England) Andrew Dixon	-	-	
24th	Slovakia	2004	(Slovakia) Miroslav Antal	(Poland) Kazimierz Szymala	(Czech Republic) Dan Svreek	(Slovakia) J. Canda	(Czech Republic) P.Machen	
23rd	Spain	2003	(Italy) Stefano Cotugno	(France) Bernard Marguet	(United States) Jeff Currier	-	-	
22nd	France	2002	(France) Jerome Brossutti	(Czech Republic) Tomas Starychfojtu	(France) Bernard Marguet	-	-	
21st	Sweden	2001	(Czech Republic) Vladimir Sedivy	(South Africa) Mark Yelland	(France) Pascal Cognard	(Poland) Stanislaw Guzdek	(Australia) Scott Tucker	
20th	England	2000	(France) Pascal Cognard	(France) Jean Michel Lauret	(Wales) Gareth Jones	(Italy) Edgardo Dona	(Norway) Erik Eikre	
19th	Australia	1999	(Australia) Ross Stuart	(Scotland) Sandy Nicolson	(Australia) Pat O’Keefe	(Australia) Shane Murphy	(France) Bernard Marguet	
18th	Poland	1998	(Czech Republic) Tomas Starychfojtu	(Italy) Angelo Ferrari	(Slovakia) Jozef Trnka	(Czech Republic) Milan Janus	(Poland) Artur Raclawski	
17th	United States	1997	(France) Pascal Cognard	(France) Alain Magnien	(Czech Republic) Tomas Starychfojtu	(England) Jeremy Herrmann	(Belgium) Alain Gigot	
16th	Czech Republic	1996	(Italy) Pierluigi Cocito	(Poland) Antoni Tondera	(Czech Republic) Jan Pecina	-	-	
15th	(Republic of Ireland) Ireland	1995	(England) Jeremy Herrmann	(Belgium) Alain Gigot	(Australia) Owen Nuttridge	-	-	
14th	Norway	1994	(France) Pascal Cognard	(Wales) Howel Morgan	(Italy) Pierluigi Cocito	-	-	
13th	Canada	1993	(Wales) Russell Owen	(Poland) Franciszek Szajnik	(England) Jeremy Lucas	-	-	
12th	Italy	1992	(Italy) Pierluigi Cocito	(Italy) Carlo Baldassini	(Poland) Antoni Tondera	-	-	
11th	New Zealand	1991	(England) Brian Leadbetter	(Poland) Adam Sikora	(France) Jan Astier	(Czech Republic) Milan Janus	(Slovakia) Slavoj Svoboda	
10th	Wales	1990	(Poland) Franciszek Szajnik	(Poland) Adam Sikora	(Belgium) Albert Bigare	(Czechoslovakia) Milan Janus	(France) Rene Brugere	
9th	Finland	1989	(Poland) Vladi Trzebunia	(Czechoslovakia) Slavoj Svoboda	(Finland) Jyrki Lamsa	-	-	
8th	Australia	1988	(England) John Pawson	(England) Brian Thomas	(Australia) T. Piggott	(England) Bob Church	(Australia) J. Ramf	
7th	England	1987	(England) Brian Leadbetter	(England) John Pawson	(England) Chris Ogborne	-	-	
6th	Belgium	1986	(Czech Republic) Slavoj Svoboda	(Italy) Angelo Ferrari	(France) Andre Terrier	-	-	
5th	Poland	1985	(Poland) Leslaw Frasik	(Poland) Kazimierzs Sasula	(Slovakia) Pavol Gavura	-	-	
4th	Spain	1984	(England) Tony Pawson	(France) J-P Guillemaund	(Italy) Angelo Ferrari	-	-	
3rd	Italy	1983	(Spain) Alvarez	(Italy) Silvano Ventura	(France) Didier Bischops	-	-	
2nd	Spain	1982	(Spain) Diez Y Diez	(Spain) Pereda	(Italy) Giovanni Vigetti	-	-	
1st	Luxembourg	1981	(Netherlands) Cor Wittkamp	(Belgium) Marc Reckinger	(Belgium) Didier Bischops	-	-	

Women's Team Results

WFFC	Host nation	Year	Champion	Runner up	3rd place	4th place	5th place
5th WFFC	Norway	2026	South Africa	France	Finland	Norway	United States
4th WFFC	United States	2025	United States	Czech Republic	South Africa	Canada	New Zealand
3rd WFFC	Czech Republic	2024	Czech Republic	France	Australia	United States	Finland
2nd WFFC	Canada	2023	Czech Republic	Canada	United States	Australia	England
1st WFFC	Norway	2022	Czech Republic	Finland	Norway	United States	Australia

Women's Individual Results

WFFC	Host nation	Year	Champion	Runner up	3rd place	4th place	5th place
5th WFFC	Norway	2026	(South Africa) Maria Elizabeth Heyns	(France) Julie Quillard	(Finland) Maria Tuominen	(France) Mélanie Meissel	(Finland) Aino Hynna
4th WFFC	United States	2025	(United States) Tess Weigand	(United States) Melissa Smith	(Czech Republic) Marketa Prochazkova	(Czech Republic) Katerina Svagrova	(Czech Republic) Tereza Rutova
3rd WFFC	Czech Republic	2024	(Czech Republic) Markova Simunkova	(France) Julie Quillard	(Czech Republic) Katerina Svagrova	(United States) Ashley Wilmont	(Czech Republic) Tereza Rutova
2nd WFFC	Canada	2023	(Czech Republic) Katerina Svagrova	(Czech Republic) Eliska Markova	(Canada) Kathy Ruddick	(England) Liane Frost	(South Africa) Marlize Heyns
1st WFFC	Norway	2022	(Czech Republic) Tereza Rutova	(Czech Republic) Katerina Svagrova	(Czech Republic) Marketa Prochazkova	(Czech Republic) Eliska Markova	(Finland) Aino Hynna

== Recent and upcoming events ==
The 2020 event was postponed in 2020 due to the COVID-19 pandemic, though resumed in August 2021 in the Kuusamo and Taivalkoski regions of Finland.

The 41st WFFC took place in September 2022 in the principality of Asturias in Spain, fished on the rivers Caudal, Piloña, Trubia, Narcea, and on lake El Arenero near Tineo. Spain as hosts, were also the winning team, with France in second and Czech Republic third. Julien Daguillanes of France won the individual title for the second time, having previously won before in 2016 in the United States.

The 43rd WFFC was held in the Ariège, Aude and Pyrénées-Orientales regions of Occitaine, in France from 22nd - 30th June 2024.

=== 2018 > Trentino, Italy ===
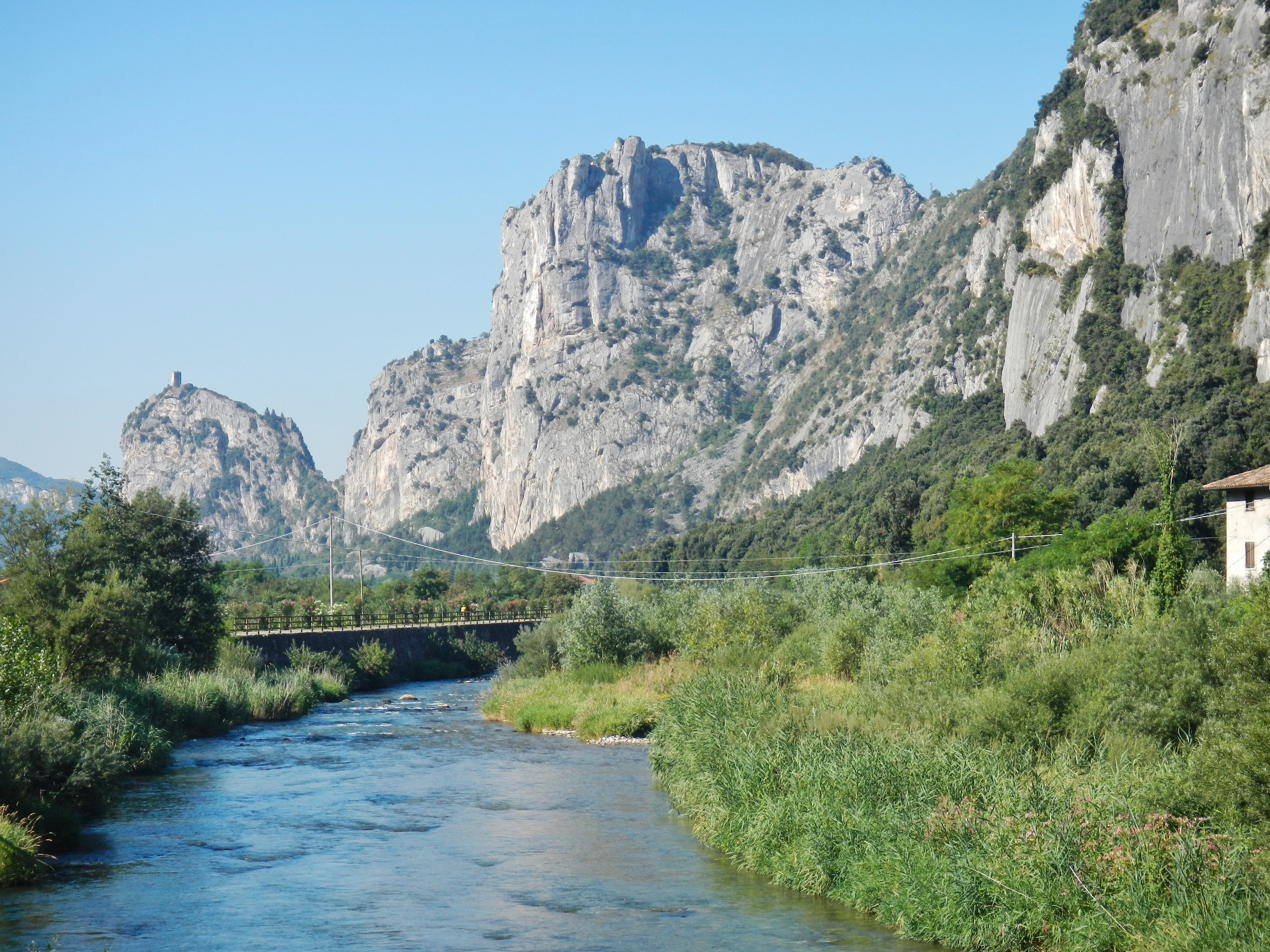
River Sarca at Castello di Arco, near Trentino, Italy

Italy Hosted the 38th FIPS Mouche World Fly Fishing Championships in 2018, which was fished in Comano Terme, Trentino area of Italy. Spain won the team event and also the individual with David García Ferreras victorious at The event was based at the Sarca River in Tione di Trento at the foot of the Natural Park Adamello Brenta, at Arco and at Pinzolo. Also at the Noce River at the Val di Non, and the Cornisello lake at the foot of Monte Giner near Mezzana within view of the Brenta Dolomites. Species available in these waters include Marble trout (Salmo marmoratus) and Lake Char (Salvelinus umbla), both species indigenous to this region, also Brown trout (Salmo trutta) and Grayling (Thymallus thymallus).

=== 2019 > Tasmania, Australia ===
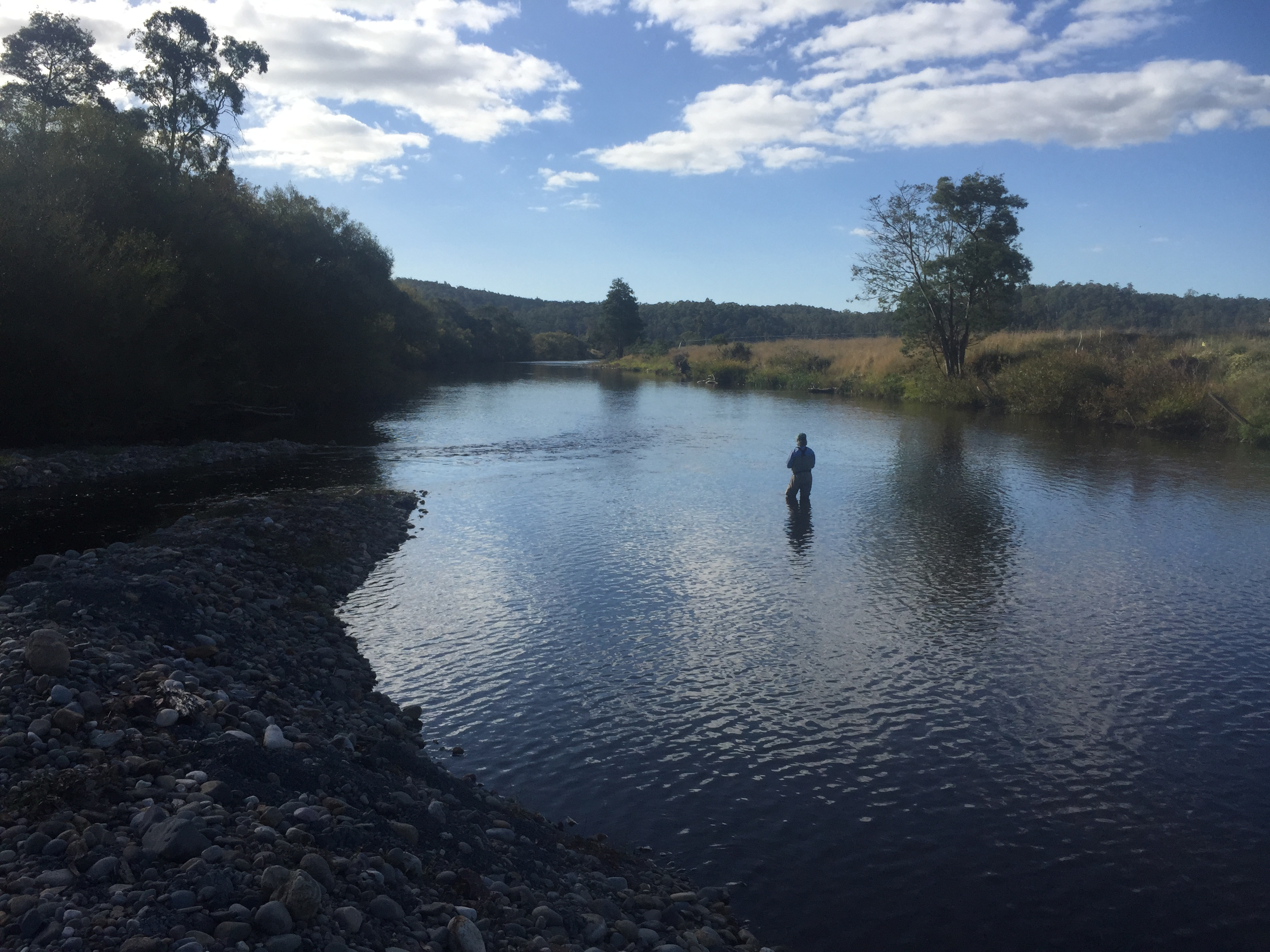
Mersey River, Tasmania

Australia hosted the 39th FIPS-Mouche World fly Fishing Championships, which took place between 30 November to 8 December 2019 in on the island of Tasmania. The venues fished were Penstock Lagoon, Meander River, Woods lake, Mersey river and Little Pine Lagoon which had featured before in the 1988 World Fly Fishing championships. The lakes and lagoons are situated near the small town of Miena, Tasmania, including Penstock lagoon, Great Lake and Little Pine Lagoon. The geographic centre of Tasmania is located on the western shore of the lagoon. The species of fish caught were brown trout (Salmo trutta) and rainbow trout (Oncorhynchus mykiss). Brown trout (a non-indigenous species to Tasmania) were first introduced to Australia on 4 May 1864 when 2700 live brown trout ova, which had been packed in ice since leaving England, were hatched into the Plenty river near Hobart, Tasmania. Rainbow trout from North America were introduced in 1894. The team event was won by France, the individual title went to Howard Croston of England.

=== 2021 > Kuusamo, Finland ===
The 40th FIPS Mouche World Fly Fishing Championships was originally postponed in 2020 due to the COVID-19 pandemic, then fished during August 2021 in the Kuusamo and Taivalkoski regions of Finland. Both the team event and individual titles were dominated by the home nation Finland taking 4 of the top 5 places including the new world champion Heikki Kurtti.

=== 2023 > Slovakia ===
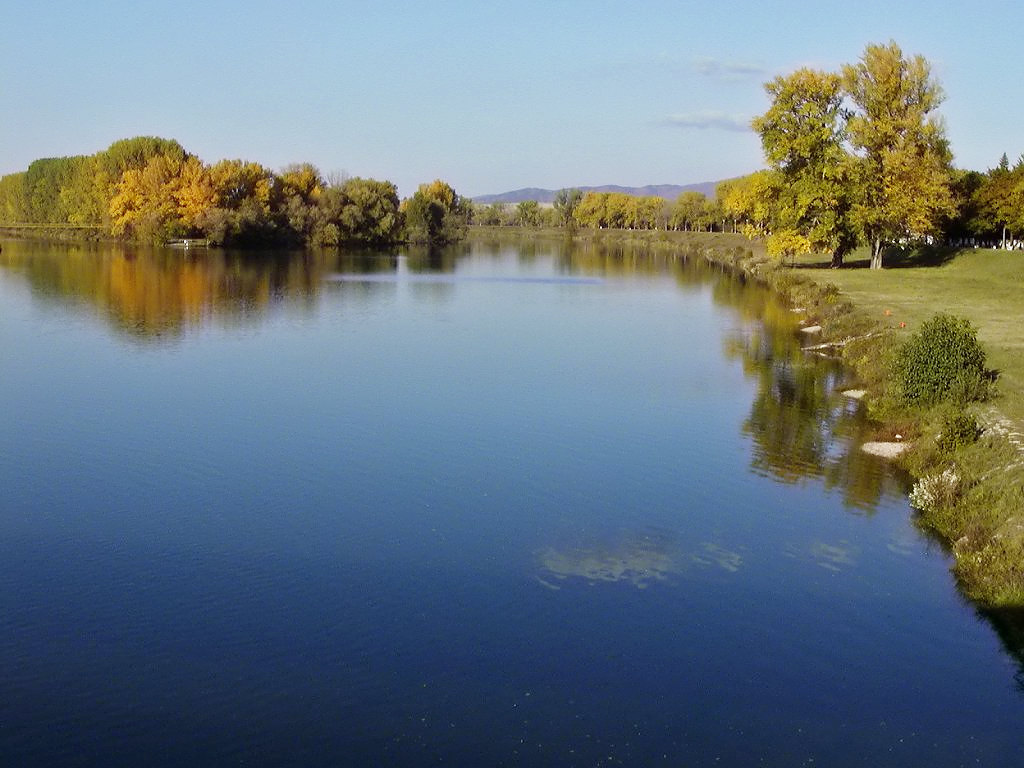
The Váh river near Piešťany, Slovakia

Slovakia held the 42nd FIPS Mouche World Flyfishing Championship 2023, which was won by France, who also won the individual prize with Pierre Kuntz securing the title. The venues fished were the rivers Váh, Belá, Poprad and Orava and on the water dam Palcmanska Maša located on the river at Dedinky near Dobšiná.

== Medal table ==
- After Youth Team, Senior Team, Senior Individual, Women's Team, Women's Individual, Masters Individual and Masters Team results.

Rank	Country	(gold) Gold	(silver) Silver	(bronze) Bronze	Medals
1	Czech Republic	27	16	24	67
2	France	24	30	19	73
3	Italy	17	15	12	44
4	Spain	17	14	13	44
5	United States	12	8	12	32
6	England	12	3	9	24
7	Poland	8	17	3	28
8	Ireland	3	2	2	7
9	South Africa	3	1	3	7
10	Netherlands	3	0	2	5
11	Finland	2	5	5	12
12	Australia	2	1	6	9
13	Slovakia	2	0	5	7
14	Wales	1	3	1	5
15	Czechoslovakia	1	2	1	4
16	New Zealand	1	1	2	4
17	Belgium	0	8	8	16
18	Canada	0	3	1	4
19	Scotland	0	2	2	4
20	Luxembourg	0	1	1	2
21	Montenegro	0	1	0	1
22	Bosnia and Herzegovina	0	0	1	1
22	Chile	0	0	1	1
22	Norway	0	0	1	1
Total		135	133	134	402

== Multiple individual champions ==
(France) Pascal Cognard 3, (France) Pierre Kuntz 3, (England) Brian Leadbetter 2, (Italy) Pierluigi Cocito 2, (Italy) Valerrio Santi Amantini 2, (Czech Republic) Antonin Pešek 2, (France) Julien Daguillanes 2.

== See also ==
- World Freshwater Angling Championships
