= Billy Lane (angler) =

British fisherman (1922–1980)

For other people of the same name, see Billy Lane, Billy Lane (footballer), and Billy Lane Lauffer.

Billy Lane

Billy Lane (1922–1980) was an English angler and author. Lane, a son of a Coventry fishing tackle shop owner, was a well-known match fisherman of the mid-20th century. In the 1950s he became the captain of the Coventry National Championship team. Although he never won the individual championship, his overall record was second to none. Lane became the first Englishman to win the World Freshwater Angling Championships in 1963 which were held on the River Moselle at Wormeldange, Luxembourg. His written work includes The Billy Lane's Encyclopaedia of Float Fishing, which he wrote in conjunction with Colin Graham in 1971. In addition to his written work, Lane had his own branded range of fishing tackle which included specialist floats and rods.

== Family history ==
Billy Lane senior bought a fishing tackle shop in Much Park Street, Coventry, formerly known as Storers, which was renamed W.H. Lane and Son. Lane junior worked part-time in the shop alongside his father. Lane junior was called up to serve in World War II with the Royal Air Force in 1940. He then went on to meet Nora in 1943, who he later married in 1946. They had two children together, the first being Alan, born 23 February 1948, and later Anne, born 19 May 1949. Lane worked full-time in the shop alongside his wife and both children. In 1966, the business moved to its current location 31-33 London Rd. Lane died in 1980 at the age of 58.
