= Pennsylvania Farm Show Complex & Expo Center =

Expo center in Harrisburg, Pennsylvania, US

Coordinates: 40.28649°N 76.8839°W

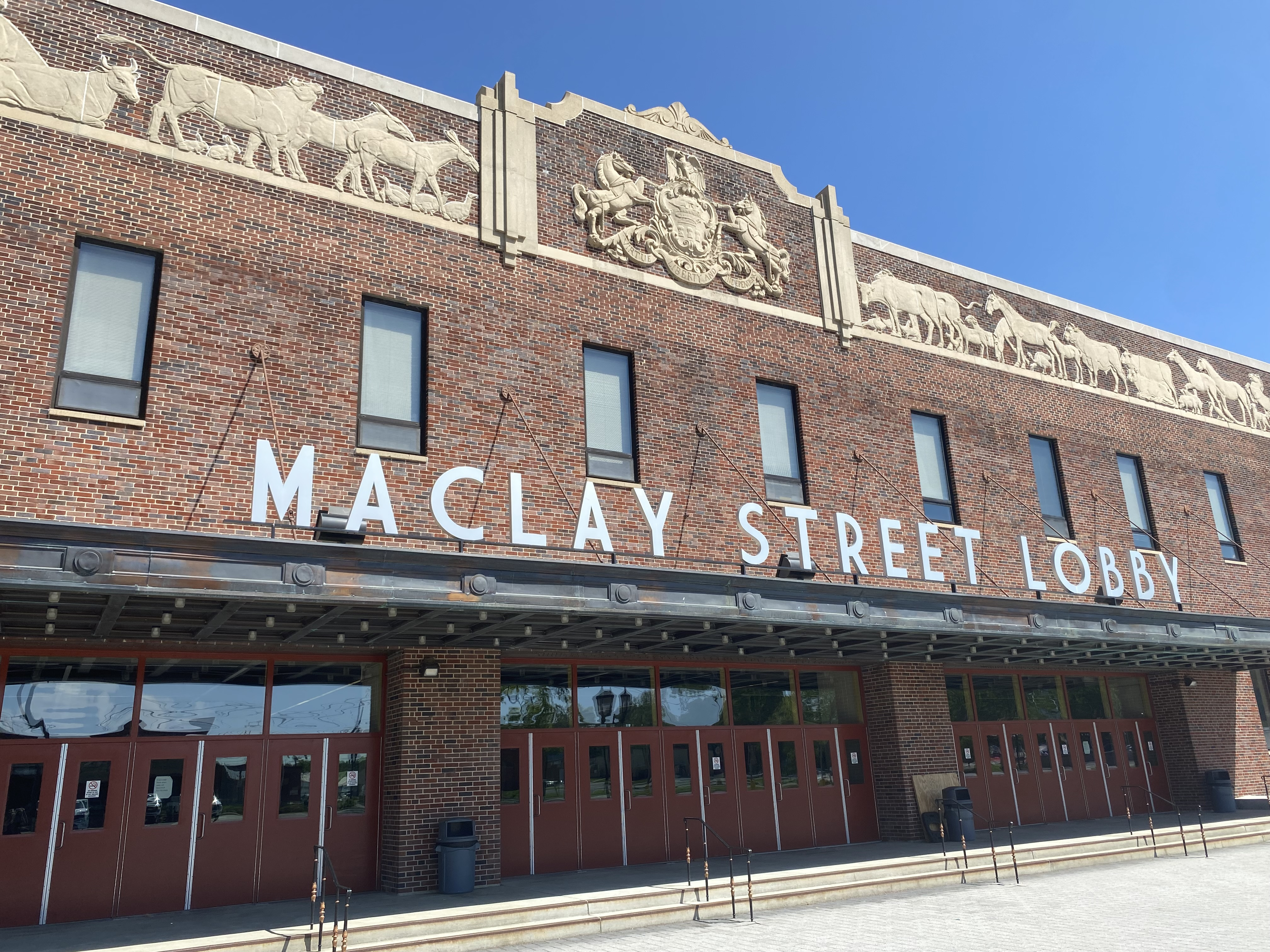
- The Maclay Street entrance. Frieze detail added by Versus T. Ritter in 1937.

- Location within Pennsylvania Location within the United States
- Interactive map of Pennsylvania Farm Show Complex & Expo Center
- Former names: State Farm Show Arena
- Location: 2300 North Cameron Street; Harrisburg, PA 17110
- Owner: Pennsylvania Department of Agriculture
- Capacity: 7,600 (New Holland Arena); 2,400 (indoor football)

Construction
- Groundbreaking: October 31, 1930
- Opened: 1931
- Architects: Lawrie & Green

Tenants
- Harrisburg Heat (NPSL/MISL) (1991–2003); Harrisburg Hammerheads (CBA) (1994–1995); Harrisburg Stampede (AIFA/SIFL/AIF) (2009–2013, 2024); Harrisburg Heat (MASL) (2012–2025); Central Penn Capitals (AIF) (2016)

The Pennsylvania Farm Show Complex & Expo Center, formerly known as State Farm Show Arena and informally known simply as the Farm Show, is a large exhibition center and indoor arena in Harrisburg, Pennsylvania. It is primarily used for concerts, agricultural exhibitions, the Pennsylvania Farm Show, and indoor football. The complex also hosts more than 200 other exhibits and trade shows every year. The Farm Show Complex is 60 acres (240,000 m^{2}), houses 24 acres (97,000 m^{2}) under roof, spread throughout 11 connected buildings including three arenas.

The complex consists of the following components:

- Main Hall, 146,527 square feet (13,612.8 m^{2}), built in 1931
- GIANT Exposition Hall, 172,000 square feet (16,000 m^{2}), built in 2001 (originally named Weis Exposition Hall)
- New Holland Arena, 28,000 square feet (2,600 m^{2}) at floor, 7318 seats, designed by architect Edmund George Good Jr., completed in 1939 (originally named Large Arena)
- Equine Arena, 39,200 square feet (3,640 m^{2}) at floor, 1660 seats, built in 2001
- Small Arena, 4,000 square feet (370 m^{2}) at floor, 918 seats

The North, Northeast, Northwest and West Halls add another 187,600 square feet (17,430 m^{2}) of space. A large equine barn serves the Equine Arena.

== History ==
=== 20th century ===
In 1921, the State Fair Commission was created to find a site for a new venue to house the increasingly popular Pennsylvania Farm Show, but was replaced in 1927 with the State Farm Products Show Commission. This commission would approve the 40-acre tract north of Harrisburg and later the design by Lawrie & Green for the initial building, with ground being broken by October 31, 1930.

During World War II, the building was used as a training center for the New Cumberland Air Command, with mechanics bays under the North Hall.

The Pennsylvania Farm Show Complex & Expo Center hosted the Harrisburg Heat of the Major Indoor Soccer League from 1991–2003, and the Harrisburg Hammerheads of the Continental Basketball Association from 1994-1995.

=== 21st century ===
A $76 million expansion and renovation began in 2001. New buildings including the Exposition Hall, Equine Arena, and Equine Barn as well as a new entrance to the Large Arena and a new off-site parking area were constructed, expanding the exhibit space to almost one million square feet.

==== Indoor/arena football ====
In 2009, the Pennsylvania Farm Show Complex & Expo Center began hosting the Harrisburg Stampede of the American Indoor Football Association, continuing to do so until 2013 after which the team joined the Professional Indoor Football League and moved to the Giant Center in nearby Hershey. The Central Penn Capitals played at the Expo Center as a member of American Indoor Football in 2016. The Stampede returned to play in 2024, but folded after briefly joining the National Arena League.

==== Indoor soccer ====
In 2012, the Harrisburg Heat of the Major Arena Soccer League returned to the Pennsylvania Farm Show Complex & Expo Center to play their home games in the Equine Arena. The team returned to the New Holland Arena beginning with its 2014–15 season.

Boxing matches and monster truck rallies have also been held at the venue.

In 2020 and 2021, the Farm Show Complex housed Pennsylvania's stockpile of personal protective equipment related to the COVID-19 pandemic. The state leased private warehouse space for the medical supplies in July 2021, freeing up the complex for events. During the 2020-2021 hiatus, a $21 million renovation was made to the complex, improving its public safety, sustainability, and energy efficiency.

== Annual events held at the Farm Show Complex ==
- Pennsylvania Farm Show (January), largest indoor agricultural event held in the United States
- Pennsylvania Auto Show (January)
- PRCA First Frontier Circuit Finals Rodeo (January)
- Great American Outdoor Show, formerly Eastern Sports and Outdoor Show (February), the world's largest outdoor recreation show and expo
- Motorama Races and Events (February)
- Horse World Expo (February/ March) Demonstrations, clinics, many vendors and evening performances by Theatre Equus
- Fire Expo (May)
- Jalsa Salana USA, an annual gathering of the US Ahmadiyya Muslim Community (July)
- All American Dairy Show (September)
- Keystone International Livestock Exposition (October)
- Pennsylvania National Horse Show (October)
