= Ribarroja Dam =

Concrete gravity dam

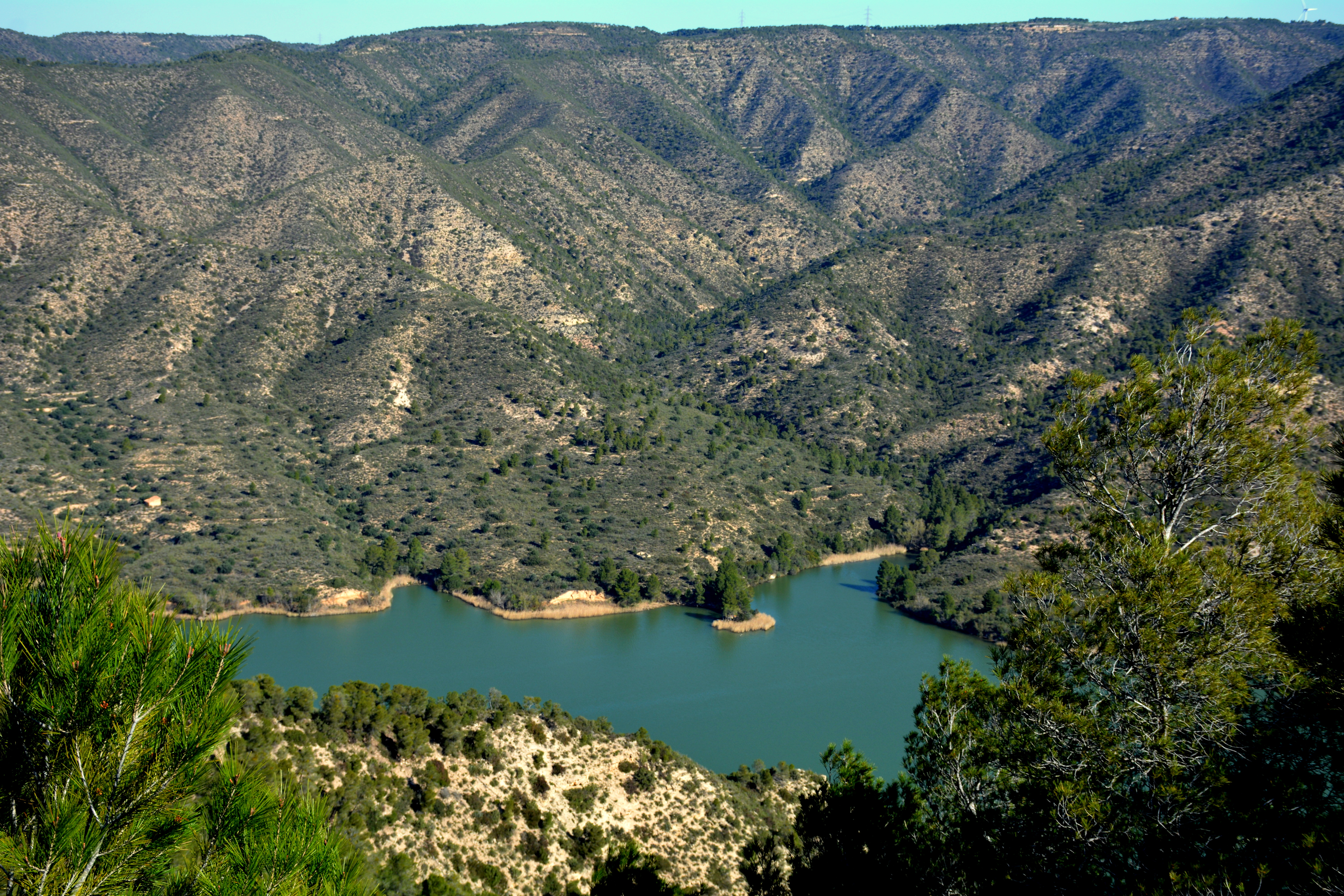

- Location within Spain
- Official name: Presa de Ribarroja
- Location: Province of Tarragona, Spain
- Coordinates: 41.243748°N 0.432758°E
- Purpose: Power
- Status: Operational
- Opening date: 1969
- Owner: Endesa
- Operator: Endesa

Dam and spillways
- Type of dam: Concrete gravity dam
- Impounds: Ebro
- Height (foundation): 60 m (200 ft)
- Length: 362.4 m (1,189 ft)
- Elevation at crest: 76 m (249 ft)
- Dam volume: 800,000 m^{3} (28,000,000 cu ft)
- Spillway type: Over the dam
- Spillway capacity: 11,670 m^{3}/s (9.46 acre⋅ft/s)

Reservoir
- Total capacity: 210,000,000 m^{3} (170,000 acre⋅ft)
- Surface area: 21.52 km^{2} (8.31 mi^{2})
- Maximum length: 50 km (31 mi)
- Maximum water depth: 34 m (112 ft)
- Normal elevation: 70 m (230 ft)

Power Station
- Commission date: 1969
- Hydraulic head: 34 max (20 min)
- Turbines: 4 Kaplan-type
- Installed capacity: 262.8 MW

Ribarroja Dam (Spanish: Presa de Ribarroja, Riba-roja) is a concrete gravity dam located in the province of Tarragona, Spain, that impounds the Ebro. About 35 km upstream of Ribarroja dam is Mequinenza dam. About 15 km downstream is Flix dam.

Empresa Nacional Hidroeléctrica del Ribagorzana S.A. (ENHER) was mandated in 1955 by Instituto Nacional de Industria (INI) to build two dams on the Ebro near Mequinenza and Riba-roja. Mequinenza dam was built between 1957 and 1964. Work on Ribarroja dam began during the construction of Mequinenza dam. Ribarroja dam was completed in 1969. ENHER was acquired by Endesa in 1999.

== Dam ==
Ribarroja Dam is a 60 m tall (height above foundation) and 362.4 m long gravity dam with a crest altitude of 76 m. The volume of the dam is 800,000 m³. The dam features a spillway with 7 gates over the dam (maximum discharge 11,670 m³/s) and two bottom outlets with a maximum discharge of 273 (2635) m³/s.

== Reservoir ==
At full reservoir level of 70 (maximum 73, minimum 40) m.a.s.l. the reservoir has a surface area of 21.52 (20.29) km², a total capacity of 210 million m³ and a length of almost 50 km. The maximum (average) depth of the reservoir is 34 (9.7) m.

== Power plant ==
The power plant contains 4 Kaplan turbine-generators with a total nameplate capacity of 262.8 MW. Maximum (minimum) hydraulic head is 34 (20) m. Maximum flow is 225 m³/s per turbine.

== See also ==
- List of power stations in Spain
- List of dams and reservoirs in Spain
