= Coruche Biennial =

Contemporary art exhibition in Portugal

The Coruche Biennial is a contemporary art exhibition, held every two years in Coruche, Portugal. It is centered mainly on plastic arts such as painting, drawing and mix techniques. It was founded by the Portuguese architect Carlos Janeiro in 2003. The Biennial of Coruche is organized by the Museum of Coruche and the Municipal Council of Coruche.

With six years of existence, the Biennial of Coruche reached its 4th edition in October 2009.
