= Clive Branson (angler) =

Welsh angler

Clive Branson (born 1951 in Cardiff) is a Welsh angler who won the individual World Freshwater Angling Championships in 1987 after being runner-up in 1986, and team bronze medalist for Wales in 1981.

Branson produces Gold Medal ground bait, and is admin for the Match fishing page on Facebook that has over 25000 subscribers and was started in 2010.

Branson is also a prolific author, having written a number of books such as Clive Branson: My Autobiography; Clive Branson World Champion Angler (2018); Coarse Fish Encyclopedia By Clive Branson; Coarse Fish Methods and Techniques (2020); Clive Branson Float Fishing Manual; The Complete Float Fishing Manual (Coarse Fishing) 2020; and Legends in my Lifetime (2021).
