= Coruche (wine region) =

Portuguese wine region

Coruche is a Portuguese wine region encompassing the town of Coruche in the Ribatejo region. The region was initially a separate Indicação de Proveniencia Regulamentada (IPR) region, but in 2003, it became one of six subregions of the Ribatejo DOC, which has the higher Denominação de Origem Controlada (DOC) status. Its name may still be indicated together with that of Ribatejo, as Ribatejo-Coruche.

Located in the southern half of the Ribatejo region, vineyards are planted on sandy plains and relay on irrigation to sustain the vines.

== Grapes ==
The principal grapes of the Coruche region include Fernao Pires, Periquita, Preto Martinho, Tinta Amarela, Trincadeira das Pratas, Ugni blanc and Vital.

== See also ==
- List of Portuguese wine regions
