= Bob Nudd =

British fisherman

Robert James "Bob" Nudd MBE (born 1944, in Chelmsford, Essex) was the first angler to win four individual World Freshwater Angling Championships; in 1990, 1991, 1994, and 1999.

== About ==
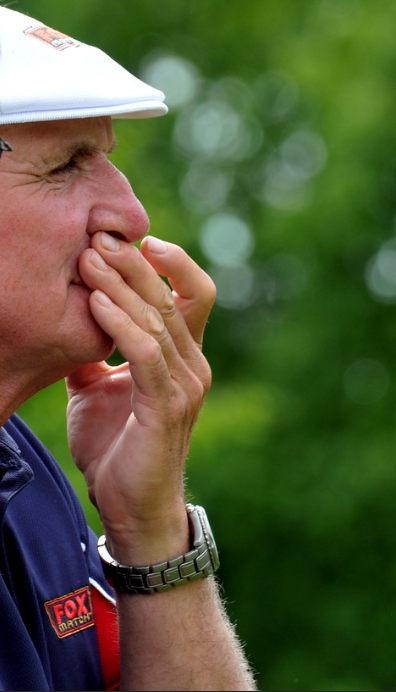
Bob Nudd in 2009

Nudd represented the England team at the international level for more than 24 years, during which time he became arguably the best known angler in the world. The highlight of his professional career was a victory in front of a home crowd at Holme Pierrepont, Nottingham, in 1994. He has been individual World Champion on a record 4 occasions, making him the most successful international angler ever at the time, later surpassed by England teammate Alan Scotthorne. Nudd's world titles were won at the following tournaments:

- 1990 (Socialist Federal Republic of Yugoslavia) Maribor, Yugoslavia
- 1991 Szeged, Hungary
- 1994 Holme Pierrepont, Nottingham, England
- 1999 Toledo, Spain

In 1991, he received the most votes ever in the BBC Sports Personality of the Year Award but was denied victory by the BBC, who ruled that a campaign to vote for him in the weekly fishing newspaper Angling Times was against competition rules. He was appointed a Member of the Order of the British Empire (MBE) for services to coarse fishing in the 1995 Birthday Honours.

Nudd lives in Cambridgeshire, England, and writes monthly for Coarse Fishing Answers and Improve Your Coarse Fishing magazine. He is still known as one of Britain's greatest anglers along with John Wilson, Dave Harrel and Richard Walker. Nudd presented a new TV series for Discovery Shed in March 2009.

He features in a Masters of Angling DVD, offering professional techniques in angling. His DVDs include Commercial carp tactics, Paste on the pole, Surface fishing with controller floats, Pole secrets and Expert fishing on the Pole.

Nudd is still a keen match fisherman at local level (2021), winning the Diss and District Angling Club Mere Masters semi-final at the age of 76.
