= Couço =

- Civil parish
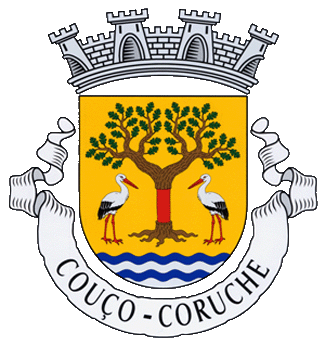
- Coat of arms

- Location in Portugal
- Coordinates: 38.988°N 8.285°W
- Country: Portugal
- Region: Oeste e Vale do Tejo
- Intermunic. comm.: Lezíria do Tejo
- District: Santarém
- Municipality: Coruche

Area
  - Total: 346.58 km^{2} (133.82 sq mi)
- Elevation: 290 m (950 ft)

Population (2011)
  - Total: 2,765
  - Density: 7.978/km^{2} (20.66/sq mi)
- Time zone: UTC+00:00 (WET)
  - Summer (DST): UTC+01:00 (WEST)

Couço (European Portuguese: [ˈkosu]) is a civil parish in the municipality of Coruche, Portugal. The population in 2011 was 2,765, in an area of 346.58 km^{2} (133.82 sq mi).
