= Coruche =

- Municipality
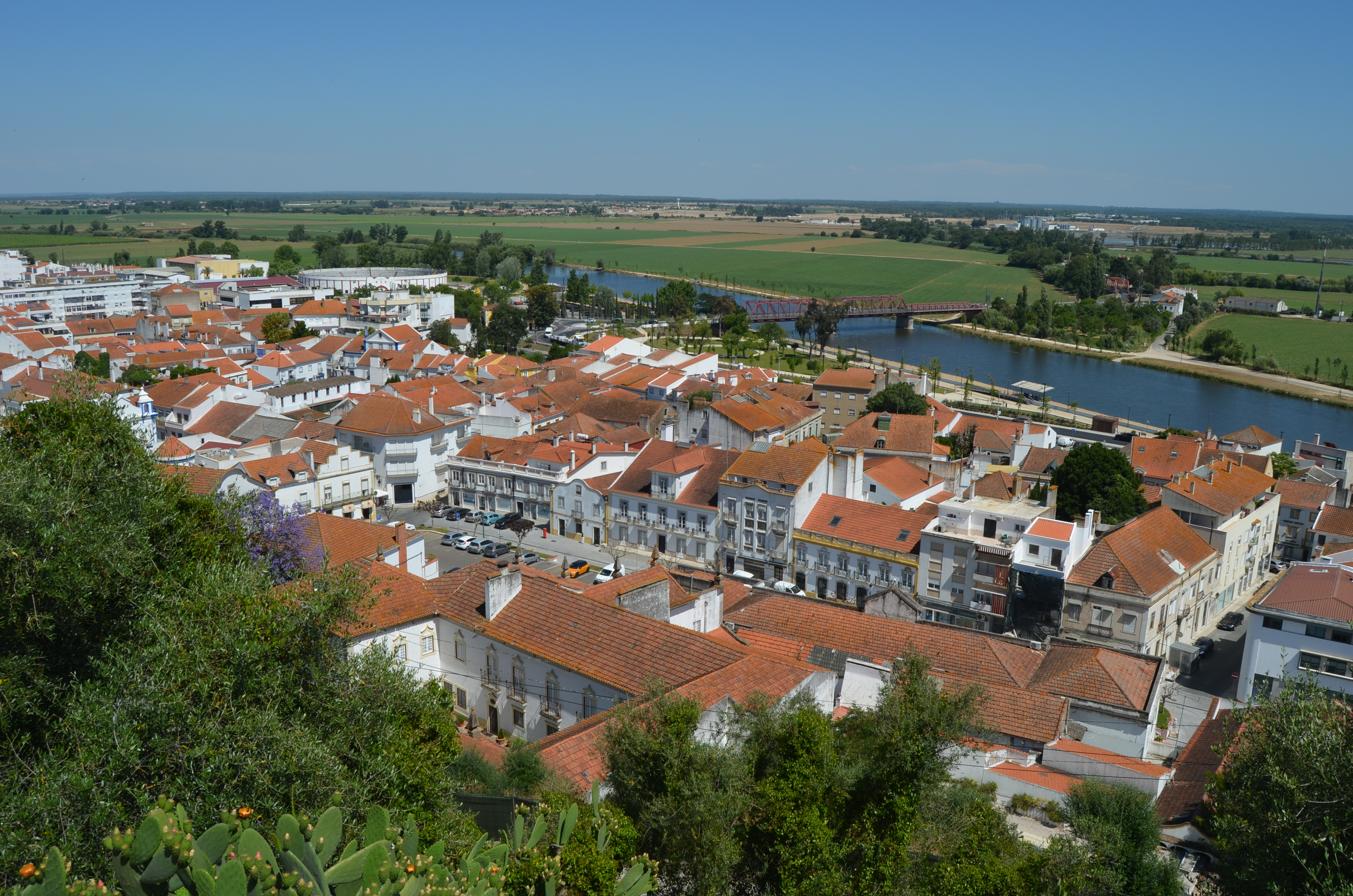
- View of Coruche

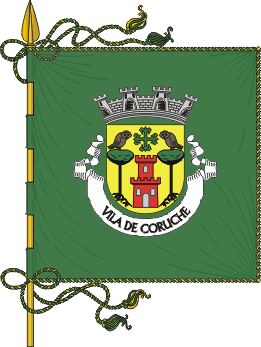
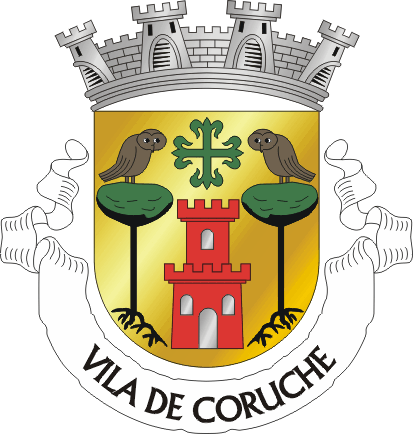
- Flag Coat of arms
- Interactive map of Coruche
- Location in Portugal
- Coordinates: 38°57′25″N 8°31′37″W
- Country: Portugal
- Region: Oeste e Vale do Tejo
- Intermunic. comm.: Lezíria do Tejo
- District: Santarém
- Parishes: 6

Government
  - President: Francisco Oliveira (PS)

Area
  - Total: 1,115.72 km^{2} (430.78 sq mi)

Population (2011)
  - Total: 19,944
  - Density: 17.875/km^{2} (46.297/sq mi)
- Time zone: UTC+00:00 (WET)
  - Summer (DST): UTC+01:00 (WEST)
- Local holiday: August 15
- Website: www.cm-coruche.pt

Coruche (Portuguese pronunciation: [kuˈɾuʃɨ]) is a municipality in Santarém District in Portugal. The population in 2011 was 19,944, in an area of 1115.72 km².

The present Mayor is Francisco Silvestre de Oliveira, elected by the Socialist Party.

The Coruche City Council has also six City Councillors: Joaquim Filipe Coelho Serrão, Francisco Silvestre de Oliveira and Nelson Fernando Nunes Galvão elected by the Socialist Party, and Ricardo Jorge Rato Ferreira Raposo, Isidro Rodrigo Silva Catarino and António Joaquim Soares elected by Coligação Democrática Unitária. The municipal holiday is August 17.

== Parishes ==
Administratively, the municipality is divided into 6 civil parishes (freguesias):

- Biscainho - which includes the settlement of Courelas
- Branca - which includes Arriça, Figueiras
- Coruche, Fajarda e Erra - which includes Azervadinha, Erra, Fajarda, Foros do Paul, Frazão, Vale Mansos, Santo Antonino
- Couço - which includes Couço, Santa Justa, Foros de Lagoiços, Volta do Vale, Courelinhas, Varejola
- Santana do Mato - which includes Carapuções
- São José da Lamarosa - which includes Azerveira, Zebrinho, Feixe

== Climate ==
Climate data for Coruche (1991–2020)
Month	Jan	Feb	Mar	Apr	May	Jun	Jul	Aug	Sep	Oct	Nov	Dec	Year
Record high °C (°F)	24.2 (75.6)	25.7 (78.3)	30.7 (87.3)	34.4 (93.9)	38.8 (101.8)	42.8 (109.0)	43.4 (110.1)	46.1 (115.0)	42.9 (109.2)	36.3 (97.3)	27.8 (82.0)	24.3 (75.7)	46.1 (115.0)
Mean daily maximum °C (°F)	15.5 (59.9)	17.0 (62.6)	20.2 (68.4)	22.1 (71.8)	25.7 (78.3)	29.4 (84.9)	31.6 (88.9)	32.2 (90.0)	29.5 (85.1)	24.5 (76.1)	18.8 (65.8)	16.0 (60.8)	23.5 (74.3)
Daily mean °C (°F)	9.5 (49.1)	10.4 (50.7)	13.1 (55.6)	15.1 (59.2)	18.2 (64.8)	21.4 (70.5)	23.1 (73.6)	23.4 (74.1)	21.3 (70.3)	17.7 (63.9)	12.9 (55.2)	10.3 (50.5)	16.4 (61.5)
Mean daily minimum °C (°F)	3.4 (38.1)	3.8 (38.8)	6.0 (42.8)	8.0 (46.4)	10.8 (51.4)	13.3 (55.9)	14.6 (58.3)	14.7 (58.5)	13.1 (55.6)	10.9 (51.6)	7.1 (44.8)	4.6 (40.3)	9.2 (48.6)
Record low °C (°F)	−8.6 (16.5)	−6.7 (19.9)	−6.0 (21.2)	0.1 (32.2)	2.7 (36.9)	7.2 (45.0)	7.2 (45.0)	6.5 (43.7)	4.5 (40.1)	0.3 (32.5)	−4.5 (23.9)	−6.6 (20.1)	−8.6 (16.5)
Average precipitation mm (inches)	67.9 (2.67)	48.0 (1.89)	53.9 (2.12)	50.8 (2.00)	47.8 (1.88)	10.4 (0.41)	4.3 (0.17)	4.9 (0.19)	33.4 (1.31)	88.9 (3.50)	78.6 (3.09)	87.1 (3.43)	556.0 (21.89)
Average precipitation days (≥ 1 mm)	8.7	6.8	6.7	7.6	6.0	1.8	0.6	0.9	3.4	7.9	8.6	8.4	67.4
Source: Instituto Português do Mar e da Atmosfera

Climate data for Coruche (Estação Experimental António Teixeira), 1961-1990, altitude: 25 m (82 ft)
Month	Jan	Feb	Mar	Apr	May	Jun	Jul	Aug	Sep	Oct	Nov	Dec	Year
Record high °C (°F)	20.7 (69.3)	25.5 (77.9)	27.0 (80.6)	29.8 (85.6)	39.1 (102.4)	43.5 (110.3)	39.8 (103.6)	39.8 (103.6)	40.0 (104.0)	35.8 (96.4)	27.0 (80.6)	23.6 (74.5)	43.5 (110.3)
Mean daily maximum °C (°F)	14.8 (58.6)	16.1 (61.0)	19.4 (66.9)	20.0 (68.0)	23.0 (73.4)	27.7 (81.9)	30.3 (86.5)	30.4 (86.7)	29.5 (85.1)	23.9 (75.0)	18.9 (66.0)	15.8 (60.4)	22.5 (72.5)
Daily mean °C (°F)	9.1 (48.4)	10.7 (51.3)	12.5 (54.5)	14.2 (57.6)	16.8 (62.2)	20.7 (69.3)	22.5 (72.5)	22.3 (72.1)	21.5 (70.7)	17.2 (63.0)	13.3 (55.9)	10.8 (51.4)	16.0 (60.7)
Mean daily minimum °C (°F)	3.4 (38.1)	5.3 (41.5)	5.6 (42.1)	8.4 (47.1)	10.5 (50.9)	13.7 (56.7)	14.8 (58.6)	14.2 (57.6)	13.5 (56.3)	10.6 (51.1)	7.8 (46.0)	5.7 (42.3)	9.5 (49.0)
Record low °C (°F)	−6.0 (21.2)	−5.0 (23.0)	−4.8 (23.4)	−1.3 (29.7)	4.5 (40.1)	6.5 (43.7)	9.5 (49.1)	7.8 (46.0)	5.8 (42.4)	2.5 (36.5)	−2.5 (27.5)	−5.0 (23.0)	−6.0 (21.2)
Average rainfall mm (inches)	81.5 (3.21)	57.6 (2.27)	40.3 (1.59)	50.8 (2.00)	47.4 (1.87)	14.1 (0.56)	5.7 (0.22)	6.5 (0.26)	31.5 (1.24)	88.9 (3.50)	92.1 (3.63)	84.0 (3.31)	600.4 (23.66)
Source 1: Instituto de Meteorologia
Source 2: Portuguese Environment Agency (1981-2010 precipitation)

== Municipal holiday ==
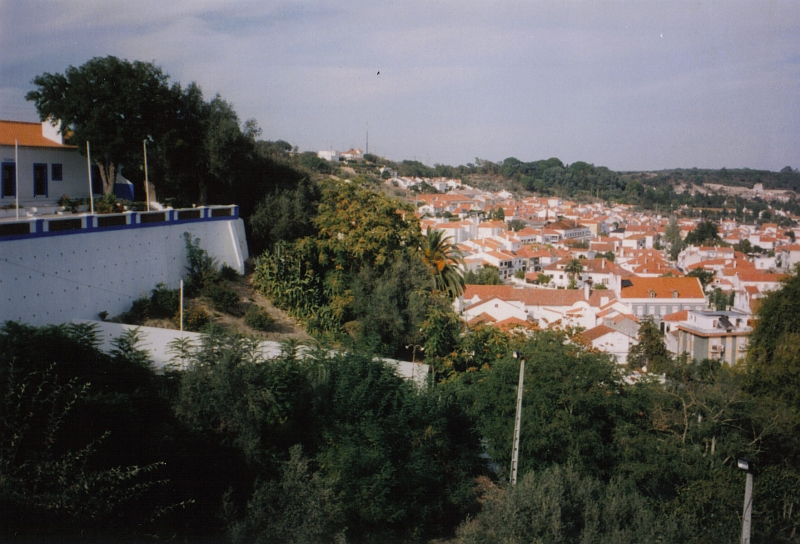
Coruche

The festival happens from August 14 to the 18 except a few years (including 2005) when it ended 19. This party is in honor of Nossa Senhora do Castelo (lit. Our Lady of the Castle). On August 14 at midnight a fireworks show starts the festival. On 17 August, the holiday, a bullfight is made in honor of Our Lady. Many runnings of bulls (a minor version of Pamplona's encierro) happen during the festivity. During all days late night parties happen in traditional local pubs.

== Notable people ==
- Maria Rosa Viseu (1935 in Couço – 2014) political activist and political prisoner; opposed the Estado Novo regime
- José Peseiro (born 1960 in Coruche) a Portuguese football manager and former player

== See also ==
- Viver Coruche
- Coruche Biennial
- Coruche IPR
