= WGFR =

- Glens Falls, New York; United States
- Frequency: 92.7 MHz
- Branding: The Revolution

Programming
- Format: Adult album alternative

Ownership
- Owner: SUNY Adirondack; (Board of Trustees of Adirondack College)

History
- First air date: January 17, 1977
- Call sign meaning: "Glens Falls Radio"

Technical information
- Licensing authority: FCC
- Facility ID: 6682
- Class: D
- ERP: 13 watts
- HAAT: 15.0 meters (49.2 ft)
- Transmitter coordinates: 43°18′44.00″N 73°38′58.00″W

Links
- Public license information: Public file; LMS
- Webcast: Listen live
- Website: wgfr.org

WGFR (92.7 FM) is a college radio station broadcasting an adult album alternative format. Licensed to Glens Falls, New York, United States, the station serves the Glens Falls area. The station is owned by Board of Trustees of SUNY Adirondack (formerly named Adirondack Community College). The studios are on the college campus, in Washington Hall.

While adult album alternative is WGFR's primary format, other formats are broadcast at various times of day. For example, there is a block devoted to funk and hip hop during the late night hours, and students play a variety of music during set "specialty hours".

WGFR is used in two ways. First, it is used as part of SUNY Adirondack's Radio/TV Broadcasting program. Students are put on air as a requirement of college course COM 188, Applied Radio Production, and/or COM 191, Radio Station Operations. Students also create special programming through COM 188. Other on-air programs are provided by people who have volunteered for an on-air slot.

There is a five-week DJ training course that is offered for those who want to be on the air at WGFR, but do not want to partake in the COM 188 or COM 191.

WGFR won Golden Microphone Awards at the March 2014 Intercollegiate Broadcast System annual conference in New York City.

== Notable alumni ==
- Bob Barrett, WAMC, WYLR, WCKM
- Lou Carnevale, WKBE, WFFG, WRCN, WKJY
- Tim Celeste, WKBE, WCQL, WWSC
- David Clark, WKBE
- Steve Cole, WENU
- Brian Delaney, WSTL, WCKM
- Alan Doane, WAMC, WGY, WFFG, WWSC, WKBE, WSCG, WKAJ, WABY
- Joe Donahue, WAMC
- Tom Jacobsen, WWSC, WYLR, WGNA
- Dan Kemp, WKBE, WFLY
- Bill Lee, WSCG
- Jenny Lewis, WCQL
- Dan Miner, WCKM
- Joe Neptune, WENU
- Joe Rosati, WHTZ
- Matt Stone WCKM
- Kate Sullivan, WFFG
- Drew Schiavi, WRGB-TV, ESPN
- Steve Teft WWSC
- "Young Pete" WCQL
