= Cornell Hill =

Mountain in New York, United States

- Location within New York Adirondack Park Location within the United States

Highest point
- Elevation: 430 feet (130 m)
- Coordinates: 42°58′07″N 73°44′07″W

Geography
- Location: NE of Round Lake, Saratoga County, New York, U.S.
- Topo map: USGS Mechanicville

Cornell Hill is a 430-foot-tall (130 m) mountain in the Capital District, New York#Capital District of New York. It is located northeast of Round Lake in Saratoga County. In 1923, a 60-foot-tall (18 m) steel fire lookout tower was built on the mountain. Due to the increased use of aerial detection, the tower ceased fire lookout operations at the end of the 1970 fire lookout season. In the summer of 2008, the tower was moved to the former Boy Scout Camp Saratoga.

== History ==
Originally, the Saratoga County Board of Supervisors appropriated $1,000 to be used to build a fire observation station on Cornell Hill. Additional funds were also contributed by a local landowner to help pay for putting up the tower, cabin and telephone line to the tower. In 1923, the Conservation Commission built a 60-foot-tall (18 m) Aermotor LS40 steel fire lookout tower on the mountain, which became operational in 1924. Noah LaCasse was the observer on Cornell Hill from 1925 to 1934. In 1901 Mr. LaCasse was a guide in the party of then Vice President Theodore Roosevelt at the time he was hiking to Mount Marcy when President McKinley was assassinated in Buffalo. Due to increased use of aerial detection, the tower ceased fire lookout operations at the end of the 1970 fire lookout season. In summer 2008, the Luther Forest Corporation dismantled and moved the tower to the former Boy Scout Camp Saratoga, now a part of the Wilton Wildlife Refuge. The tower is listed on the National Historic Lookout Register.
