= SALS =

SALS may refer to:

- Simple Approach Lighting System
- Single-Access Laparosopic Surgery
- Southern Adirondack Library System
- Southern Appalachian Labor School
