= Robert Rheinlander =

Robert H. Rheinlander (1880–1961) was an American architect, contractor and structural engineer from Glens Falls, New York.

== Career ==
Robert Rheinlander was based in Glens Falls, New York and designed and or built many well known and large buildings in the northern New York State area. He was a member of the Society of American Registered Architects. His career was predominantly from 1900 – 1945. Among Rheinlanders achievements, he designed and rebuilt The Sagamore a grand Victorian hotel on Lake George in 1921–1922 after a fire.

Robert designed and or built the following buildings which are listed on the National Register of Historic Places:

- The Cunningham House at 161 Warren Street
- The Hoopes House at 153 Warren Street
- The Hyde Museum at 169 Warren Street

Additionally, he assisted in the designs the Finch Pruyne (Finch Paper) Headquarters building in Glens Falls. Rheinlander also built the Crandall Public Library in Glens Falls

Rheinlander was a former director of the Glens Falls National Bank and Trust Co. and a director of the Tait Paper and Color Industries, later known as Imperial Paper and Color Corp and ultimately owned by Ciba-Geigy.

== Personal life ==
Robert H. Rheinlander was born in 1880. He was a native of North Adams, Massachusetts. Rhinelander was a member of the Society of American Registered Architects, a 32nd degree Mason, and a member of Senet Lodge of Masons of Albany and the Albany Sovereign Consistory, Scottish Rite Masons. He was also a member of the Glens Falls First Baptist Church. He married Pauline Dearstyne, daughter of Harvey Rey Dearstyne. They had one son, Robert Rheinlander, and a daughter who went by the nickname "Billie."

Rheinlander died in 1961 and is buried at the Glens Falls Cemetery.

== See also ==
- List of American architects
