= Glens Falls, New York =

Glens Falls
- City
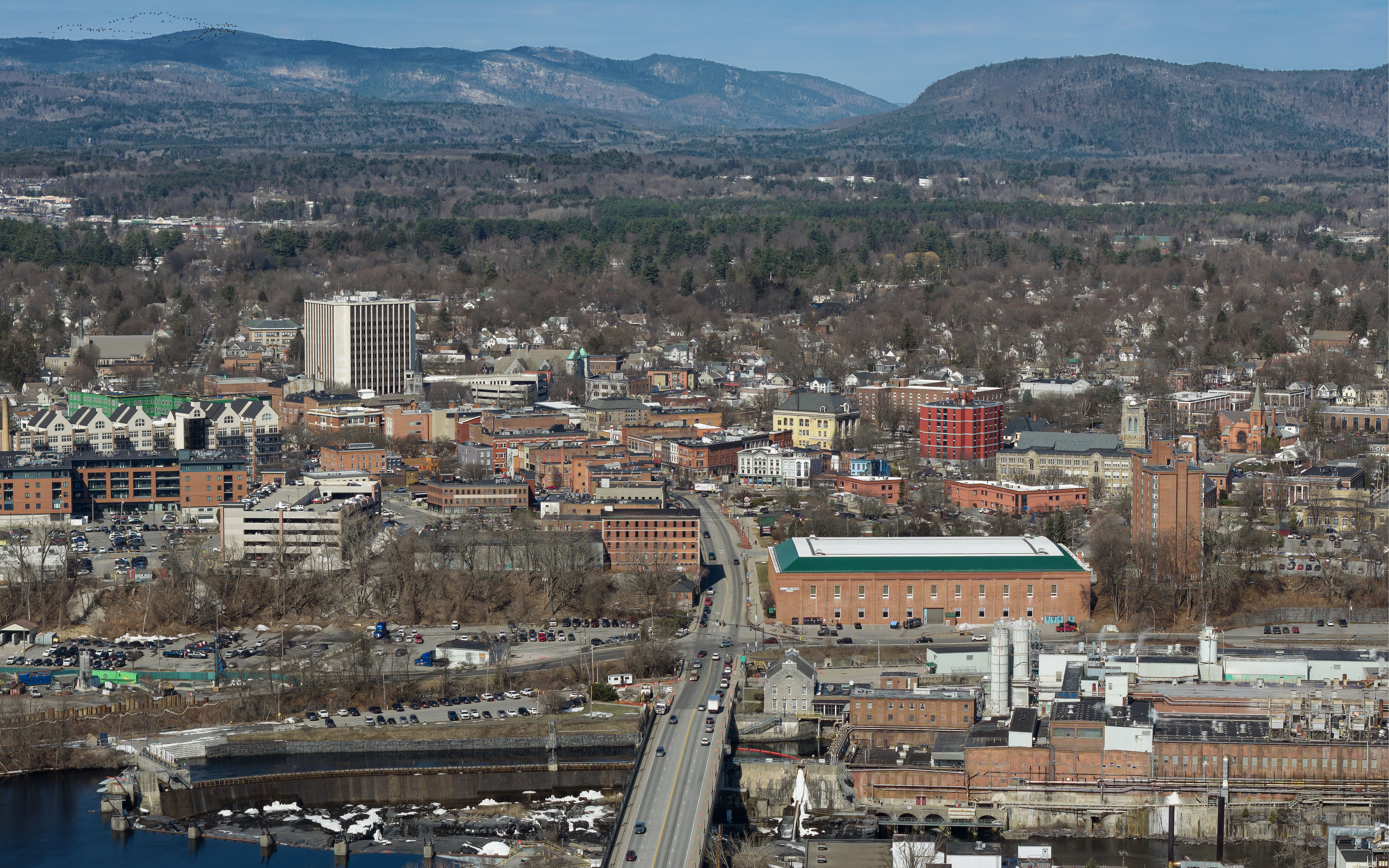
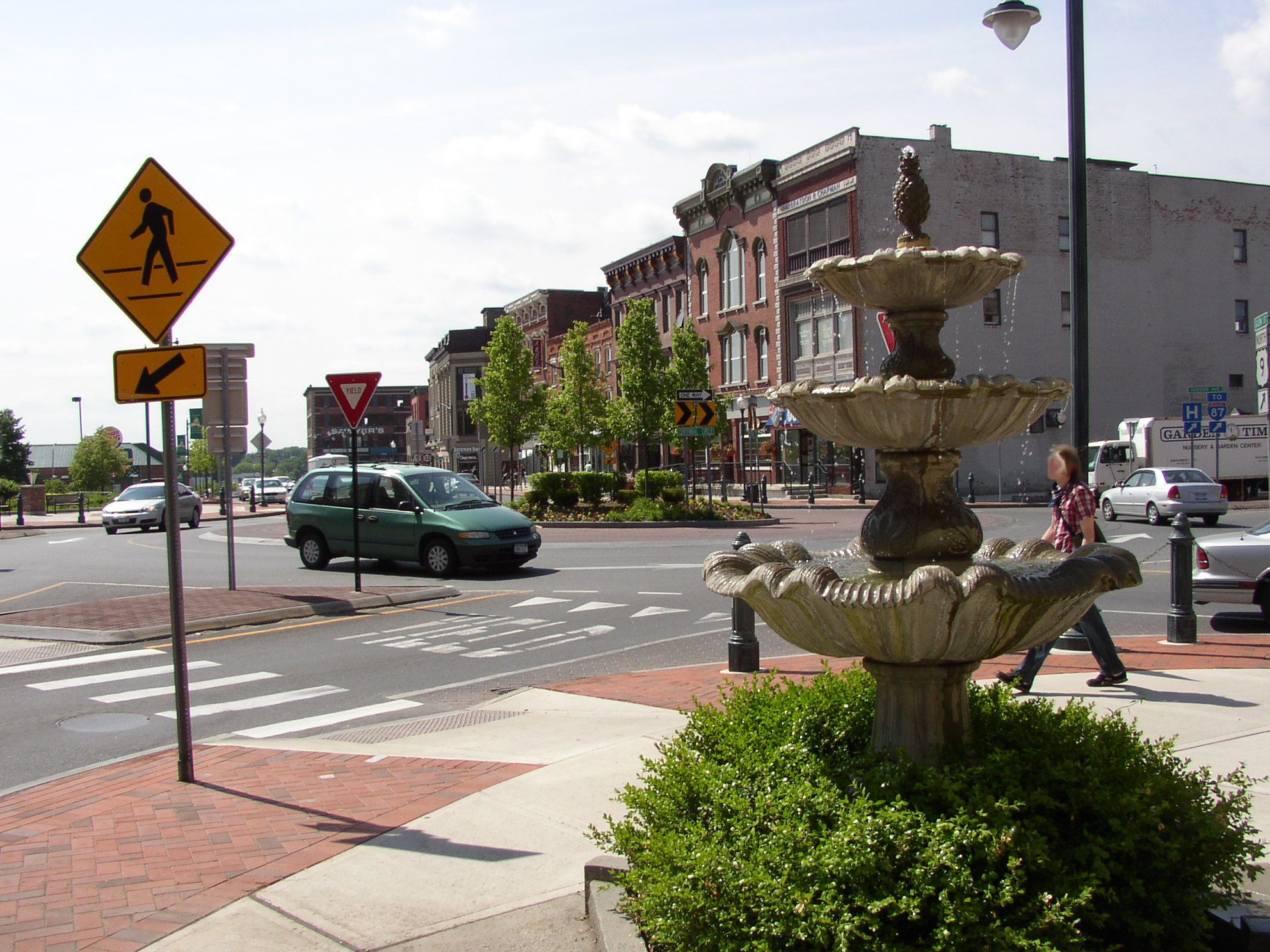
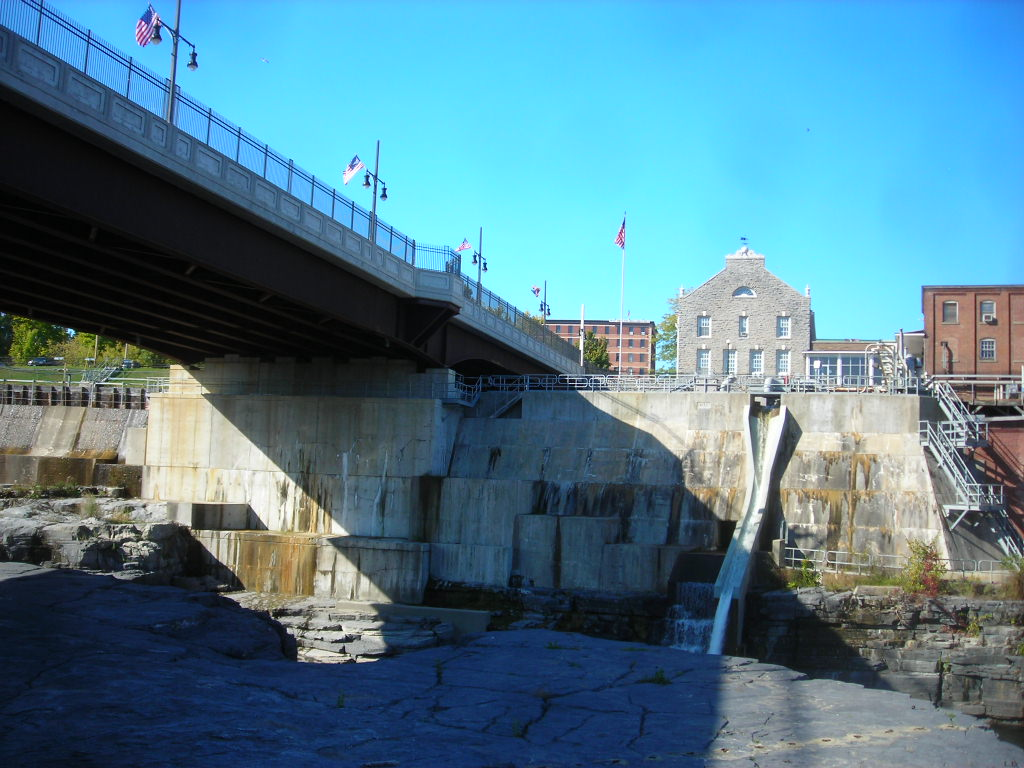
- Downtown Centennial Circle Coopers Cave
- Nicknames: Hometown U.S.A., Empire City
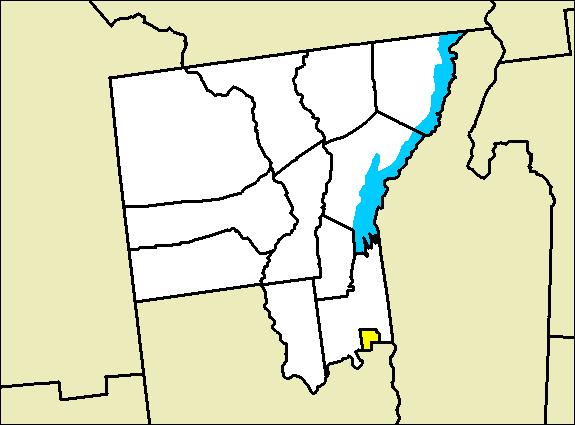
- Location of Glens Falls in Warren County

- Location in New York (state) Location within the United States
- Coordinates: 43°18′44″N 73°38′54″W
- Country: United States
- State: New York
- County: Warren
- Incorporated: 1839 (village); 1908 (city)

Government
  - Type: Mayor-Council
  - Mayor: Diana Palmer (D)

Area
  - City: 3.99 sq mi (10.33 km^{2})
  - Land: 3.85 sq mi (9.97 km^{2})
  - Water: 0.14 sq mi (0.36 km^{2}) 2.54%
  - Urban: 35.35 sq mi (91.55 km^{2})
- Elevation: 344 ft (105 m)

Population (2020)
  - City: 14,830
  - Density: 3,851.1/sq mi (1,486.92/km^{2})
  - Metro: 128,774
- Time zone: UTC−5 (EST)
  - Summer (DST): UTC−4 (EDT)
- ZIP codes: 12801
- Area codes: 518, 838
- FIPS code: 36-29333
- GNIS feature ID: 0951223
- Website: cityofglensfalls.com

Glens Falls is a city in Warren County, New York, United States, and is the central city of the Glens Falls Metropolitan Statistical Area. The population was 14,830 at the 2020 census. The name was given by Colonel Johannes Glen, the falls referring to a large waterfall in the Hudson River at the southern end of the city.

Glens Falls is a city in the southeastern corner of Warren County, surrounded by the town of Queensbury to the north, east, and west, and by the Hudson River and Saratoga County to the south. Glens Falls is known as "Hometown U.S.A.," a title Look magazine gave it in 1944. The city has also referred to itself as the "Empire City."

== History ==
"Glenn Falls", 1841

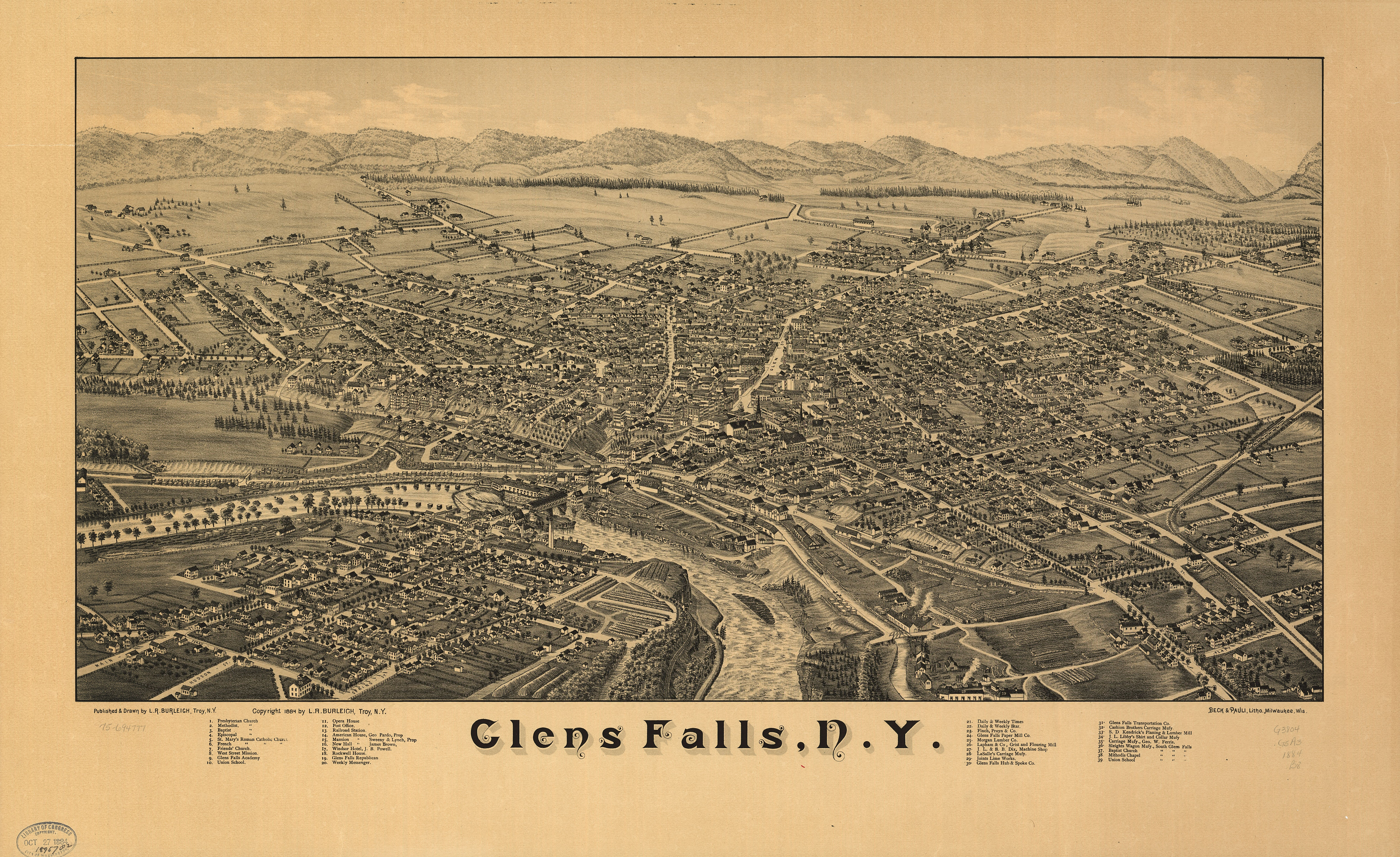
Panoramic map with list of landmarks, 1884

The area is originally called Chepontuc ("difficult place to get around") in the Iroquoian languages of the area's Indigenous inhabitants. It also referred to as the "Great Carrying Place." Later, European-American settlers named the area "The Corners" in English.

As a halfway point between Fort Edward and Fort William Henry, the falls was the site of several battles during the French and Indian War and the Revolutionary War. The then-hamlet was mostly destroyed by fire twice during the latter conflict, forcing the Quakers to abandon the settlement until the war ended in 1783. Fire also ravaged the village in 1864, 1884, and 1902.

In 1766, it was renamed Wing's Falls for Abraham Wing – the leader of the group of Quakers who established the permanent settlement – and for the falls on the Hudson River. Wing's claim to the name of the falls and the hamlet was transferred to Colonel Johannes Glen of Schenectady in 1788, either on collection of a debt, as a result of a game of cards, or in exchange for hosting a party for mutual friends, depending on which local legend is believed. Colonel Glen changed the name to "Glen's Falls," though it was often printed with varying spelling such as "Glenn's," "Glenville", or "Glens". The spelling "Glens Falls" came to be the common usage.

A post office was established in 1808. Glens Falls became an incorporated village in 1839, and was re-incorporated in 1874 and 1887, expanding the village to what would become the city limits when the state legislature granted the city charter in 1908, at which time the city became independent from the town of Queensbury.

In 2003, with permission from Queensbury, Glens Falls annexed approximately 49 acres (0.20 km^{2}) of the town. The land, known as Veterans Field or the Northway Industrial Park, is on Veterans Road between Luzerne Road and Sherman Avenue and is just east of I-87. The land was vacant at the time. A thin, 0.5 miles (0.80 km) strip of Sherman Avenue was part of this annexation, to comply with state law on contiguity of annexed land. As a result, the city and town share this stretch of highway.

== Geography ==
According to the United States Census Bureau, the city has an area of 3.9 square miles (10 km^{2}), of which 3.8 square miles (9.8 km^{2}) is land and 0.1 square miles (0.26 km^{2}) (2.54%) is water.

The city is on the Hudson River, in the Adirondack foothills, at the border of Saratoga County.

=== Climate ===
Climate data for Glens Falls, New York (Floyd Bennett Memorial Airport), 1991–2020 normals, (Note: Mean monthly maxima and minima (i.e. the expected highest and lowest temperature readings at any point during the year or given month) calculated based on data at said location from 1991 to 2020.) extremes 1893–present
Month	Jan	Feb	Mar	Apr	May	Jun	Jul	Aug	Sep	Oct	Nov	Dec	Year
Record high °F (°C)	66 (19)	70 (21)	86 (30)	92 (33)	98 (37)	98 (37)	101 (38)	101 (38)	97 (36)	87 (31)	78 (26)	69 (21)	101 (38)
Mean maximum °F (°C)	51.3 (10.7)	50.9 (10.5)	63.9 (17.7)	78.1 (25.6)	87.0 (30.6)	90.4 (32.4)	91.1 (32.8)	89.3 (31.8)	85.6 (29.8)	76.0 (24.4)	65.7 (18.7)	53.6 (12.0)	92.9 (33.8)
Mean daily maximum °F (°C)	29.7 (−1.3)	33.1 (0.6)	42.5 (5.8)	56.6 (13.7)	69.0 (20.6)	77.1 (25.1)	81.5 (27.5)	79.6 (26.4)	71.9 (22.2)	59.2 (15.1)	46.7 (8.2)	35.3 (1.8)	56.9 (13.8)
Daily mean °F (°C)	19.7 (−6.8)	21.9 (−5.6)	31.7 (−0.2)	44.6 (7.0)	56.5 (13.6)	65.0 (18.3)	69.7 (20.9)	67.8 (19.9)	59.7 (15.4)	48.0 (8.9)	37.2 (2.9)	26.6 (−3.0)	45.7 (7.6)
Mean daily minimum °F (°C)	9.7 (−12.4)	10.6 (−11.9)	20.9 (−6.2)	32.7 (0.4)	43.9 (6.6)	52.9 (11.6)	57.8 (14.3)	55.9 (13.3)	47.5 (8.6)	36.8 (2.7)	27.6 (−2.4)	18.0 (−7.8)	34.5 (1.4)
Mean minimum °F (°C)	−15.8 (−26.6)	−13.1 (−25.1)	−0.1 (−17.8)	19.3 (−7.1)	29.9 (−1.2)	39.4 (4.1)	47.5 (8.6)	44.2 (6.8)	32.6 (0.3)	22.8 (−5.1)	11.8 (−11.2)	−3.6 (−19.8)	−19.6 (−28.7)
Record low °F (°C)	−36 (−38)	−32 (−36)	−24 (−31)	3 (−16)	20 (−7)	32 (0)	32 (0)	31 (−1)	24 (−4)	15 (−9)	−7 (−22)	−34 (−37)	−36 (−38)
Average precipitation inches (mm)	2.56 (65)	1.95 (50)	2.79 (71)	3.10 (79)	3.35 (85)	3.72 (94)	4.26 (108)	3.48 (88)	3.30 (84)	3.68 (93)	3.01 (76)	3.01 (76)	38.21 (971)
Average precipitation days (≥ 0.01 in)	11.3	9.1	10.5	11.7	12.5	12.0	11.8	10.7	9.5	11.4	10.7	11.5	132.7
Source: NOAA

== Demographics ==
Historical population
Census	Pop.	Note	%±
1850	2,717		—
1860	3,780		39.1%
1870	4,500		19.0%
1880	4,900		8.9%
1890	9,509		94.1%
1900	12,613		32.6%
1910	15,243		20.9%
1920	16,638		9.2%
1930	18,531		11.4%
1940	18,836		1.6%
1950	19,610		4.1%
1960	18,580		−5.3%
1970	17,222		−7.3%
1980	15,897		−7.7%
1990	15,023		−5.5%
2000	14,354		−4.5%
2010	14,700		2.4%
2020	15,830		7.7%

=== 2020 census ===
As of the 2020 census, Glens Falls had a population of 16,830. The median age was 39.6 years. 19.1% of residents were under the age of 18 and 16.8% of residents were 65 years of age or older. For every 100 females there were 95.9 males, and for every 100 females age 18 and over there were 93.7 males age 18 and over.

100.0% of residents lived in urban areas, while 0.0% lived in rural areas.

There were 6,904 households in Glens Falls, of which 23.6% had children under the age of 18 living in them. Of all households, 31.4% were married-couple households, 24.1% were households with a male householder and no spouse or partner present, and 32.3% were households with a female householder and no spouse or partner present. About 38.8% of all households were made up of individuals and 12.6% had someone living alone who was 65 years of age or older.

There were 7,430 housing units, of which 7.1% were vacant. The homeowner vacancy rate was 2.0% and the rental vacancy rate was 5.3%.

Racial composition as of the 2020 census
Race	Number	Percent
White	14,159	88.7%
Black or African American	334	2.3%
American Indian and Alaska Native	45	0.3%
Asian	179	1.2%
Native Hawaiian and Other Pacific Islander	0	0.0%
Some other race	145	1.0%
Two or more races	968	6.5%
Hispanic or Latino (of any race)	552	3.7%

=== 2010 census ===
As of the census of 2010, there were 14,707 people, 6,548 households, and 3,529 families residing in the city. The population density was 3,685.97 inhabitants per square mile (1,423.16/km^{2}). There were 7,112 housing units at an average density of 1,782.46 per square mile (688.21/km^{2}). The racial makeup of the city was 94.7% White, 1.8% African American, 0.3% Native American, 0.6% Asian, 0.4% from other races, and 2.3% from two or more races. Hispanic or Latino people of any race were 2.3% of the population.

There were 6,548 households, out of which 26.0% had children under the age of 18 living with them, 34.0% were married couples living together, 14.4% had a female householder with no husband present, and 46.1% were non-families. 36.2% of all households were made up of individuals, and 10.7% had someone living alone who was 65 years of age or older. The average household size was 2.22 and the average family size was 2.91.

In the city, the population was spread out, with 24.3% under the age of 20, 6.8% from 20 to 24, 29.5% from 25 to 44, 27.1% from 45 to 64, and 12.5% who were 65 years of age or older. The median age was 37.6 years. For every 100 females, there were 94.3 males. For every 100 females age 20 and over, there were 90.9 males.

=== Income and poverty ===
In 2016, median income for a household in the city was estimated at $46,305, and the median income for a family was $60,545. Males had a median income of $41,993 versus $37,988 for females. About 12.6% of families and 16% of the population were below the poverty line, including 23.9% of those under age 18 and 8% of those age 65 or over.

== Economy ==
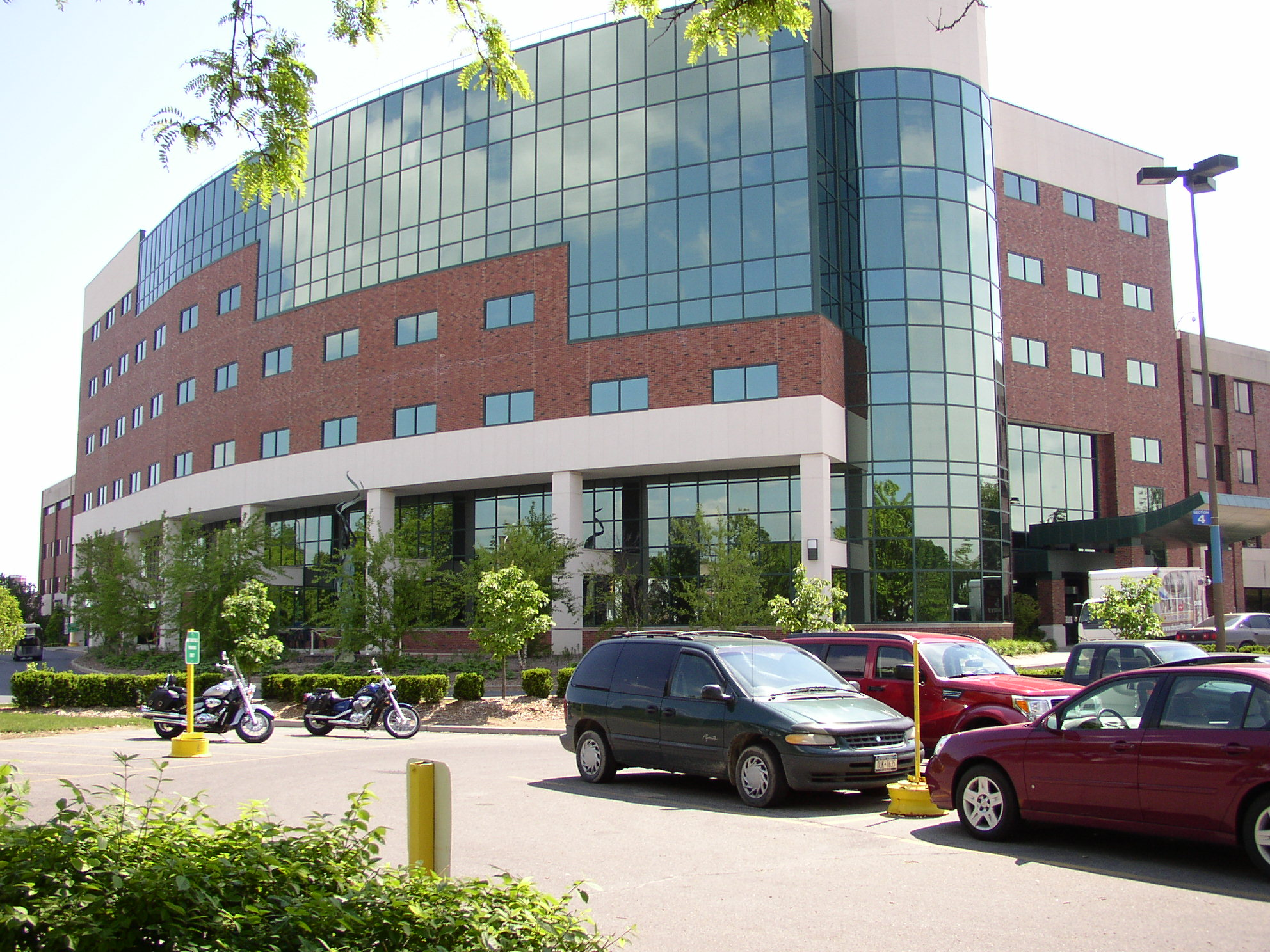
Glens Falls Hospital

The Glens Falls region is a major producer of medical devices. Glens Falls is home to Navilyst Medical, a medical device maker, previously a regional office of Pfizer and Boston Scientific Corporation. Glens Falls is also a principal provider of medical services for a vast 2,600-square-mile (6,700 km^{2}) region from Saratoga County to the south, extending northward to the central Adirondacks. These services are centered around the Glens Falls Hospital, a 410-bed facility downtown. Founded in the summer of 1897 by a group of twelve local physicians, the Glens Falls Hospital was meant to serve the entire Upper Hudson River Valley. Solomon A. Parks donated his home in Glens Falls for the original hospital. The present structure has been extensively modified, enlarged, and modernized several times to better serve the needs of the community, and it is the region's fast-response trauma center. The hospital is now the area's biggest employer. A VA outpatient facility serves veterans' medical needs.

Danfloss Flomatic Corporation is headquartered on Pruyn's Island in Glens Falls. The company is a leading manufacturer of industrial and municipal valves. Also on Pruyn's Island is Umicore, a Belgium-based company manufacturing silver-based contact materials.

Finch Paper LLC, headquartered at the base of Glen Street hill, is a major regional employer and a manufacturer of specialty paper and forest products. It is by far the largest taxpayer in the City of Glens Falls, owning property assessed at $60-million in 2006, according to city records. In mid-June 2007, Finch Pruyn & Company announced it had sold all of its assets, including 161,000 acres (652 km^{2}) of forestland in the Adirondacks, to Atlas Holdings of Greenwich, Conn. The Company name was then changed to Finch Paper LLC. Atlas then sold all of the forestland to The Nature Conservancy.

The Glens Falls Cement company, established 1893, is now a part of Lehigh Northeast, itself a division of HeidelbergCement, one of the world's largest cement producers.

Glens Falls has an old and prevalent history in the region's finance sector. Arrow Financial Corporation, headquartered downtown, is a publicly traded multi-bank holding company for Glens Falls National Bank & Trust Company (1851) and Saratoga National Bank and Trust Company. Evergreen Bank, N.A., formerly the First National Bank of Glens Falls, originated in 1853, and is now owned by banking conglomerate TD Banknorth. Advantage Capital Partners, a venture capital firm, has its New York offices downtown.

== Arts and culture ==
=== Arts and theater ===
The 300-seat Charles R. Wood Theater is home to the Adirondack Theater Festival, a professional non-profit summer theatre.

The Wood Theater provides artistic and cultural presentations throughout the year. Opened in 2003, the theater is named for Mr. Wood, a local entrepreneur and founder of The Great Escape & Splashwater Kingdom.

The Glens Falls Community Theatre has produced theatrical productions in Glens Falls for nearly 75 years.

The Lower Adirondack Regional Arts Council promotes the arts, hosts an annual arts festival, and maintains a gallery.

The Glens Falls Symphony began as a community orchestra at Adirondack Community College, now SUNY Adirondack, in 1977, initially named the Adirondack Concert Orchestra and later becoming the Adirondack Philharmonia. In 1986, the Symphony became a fully professional orchestra, making Glens Falls one of the smallest cities in the United States with a fully professional orchestra. In 1990, the Board and musicians voted to join the national American Federation of Musicians (AFM), the professional musicians’ union.

Museums include:

- The Hyde Collection, featuring European and American art.
- The Chapman Museum, featuring local history exhibits
- The World Awareness Children's Museum is a children's museum focused on cultural diversity.

Art in the Public Eye is a local non-profit arts organization.

The Shirt Factory Arts and Healing Center is a historic shirt factory that now houses artists' studios, shops, galleries, healing arts and services. More than 50 artists and 13 shops and galleries are in this building.

The Glens Falls September 11 Memorial is a tribute to the lives lost on that day, and the first responders. The memorial consists of 12 foot, solid granite towers resembling the trade center encompassed by granite walls to resemble the Pentagon. It also incorporates a piece of steel from the World Trade Center.

=== Historic sites ===
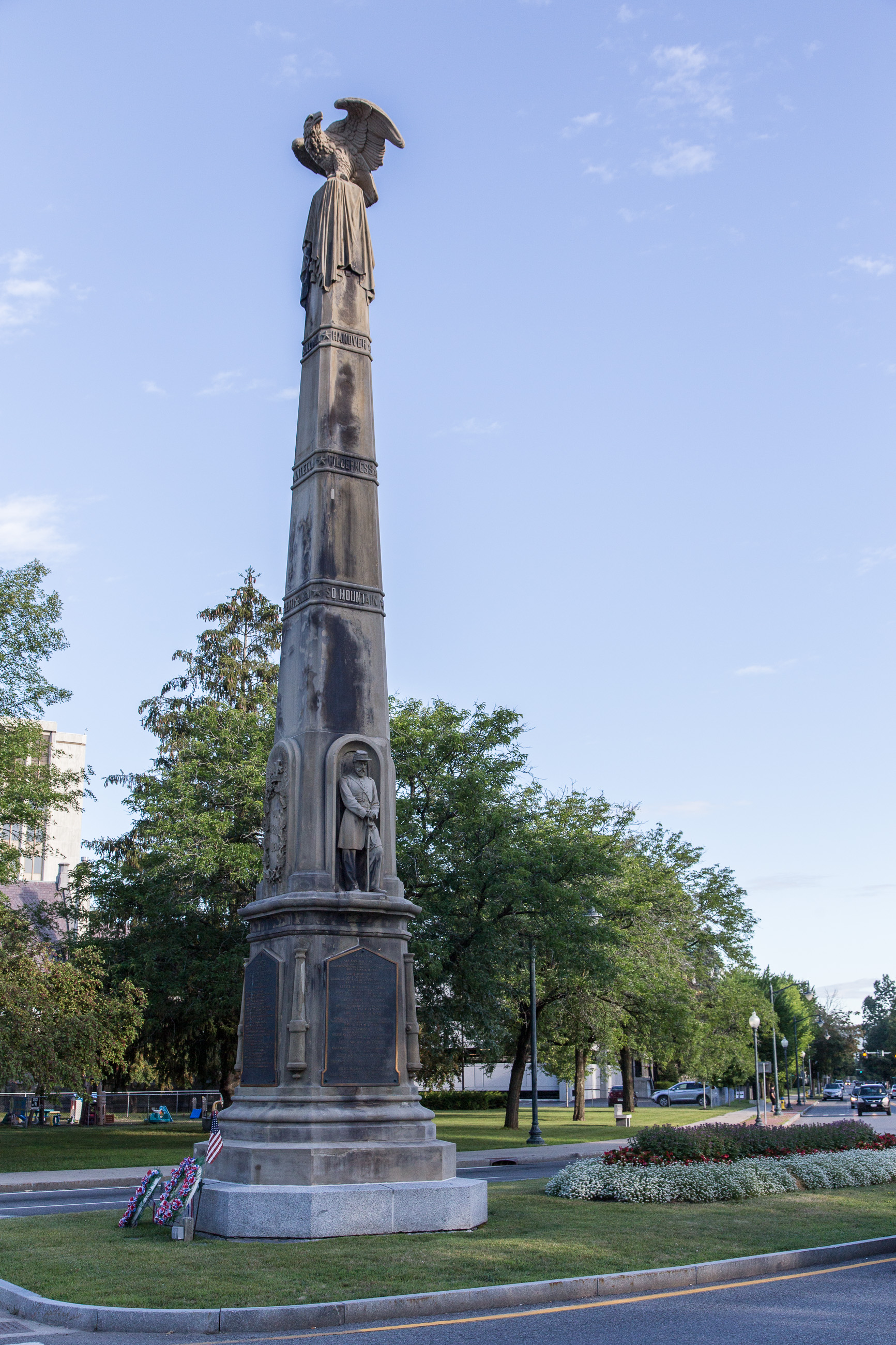
Civil War Monument

Glens Falls has two historic districts listed on the National Register of Historic Places and the equivalent New York State Register of Historic places. The Fredella Avenue historic district includes a series of concrete block structures, and the Three Squares Historic District makes up most of the Central Business District.

Historic sites:

- Crandall Public Library, founded in 1893, and relocated in 1931. It was designed by Charles A. Platt. The library is a part of the Southern Adirondack Library System.
- Civil War Monument, a limestone obelisk dedicated in 1872 to honor the 644 men from Queensbury who served in the Civil War. Ninety-five names, those of the men who died, are engraved on the monument.
- Zopher Delong House, currently the location of the Chapman Historical Museum.
- Glens Falls Feeder Canal, a hydro-electric power-plant on the Hudson River at Glens Falls. The canal was created around 1820 to feed water into the Champlain Canal. During the early 19th century, the New York State Canal System was crucial to the development of the state's economy. Lime, marble, lumber, and agricultural commodities were shipped between Glens Falls and the docks at the base of Canal Street.
- First Presbyterian Church, chartered in 1803; its fifth house of worship was constructed in 1929. It was designed by Ralph Adams Cram in his "presbyterian style" of neo-gothic architecture.
- Fort Amherst Road, the site of the former Fort Amherst. The fort constituted a block house marking the halfway point on the road between Fort Edward and Fort William Henry at the head of Lake George. This fort system, erected by the British, was built to secure the colony's northern territories from French incursions during the French and Indian War.
- Louis Fiske Hyde House, designed by Robert Rheinlander and Henry Forbes Bigelow, houses The Hyde Collection, a contemporary art.
- The Oldest Building in Glens Falls, a stone and brick structure erected around 1815.
- Quaker Meeting House, built in 1875.
- St. Mary-St. Alphonsus Regional Catholic School, established as St. Mary's Academy in 1883.
- A New York State historical marker referencing American Modernist painter Wilhelmina Weber Furlong was placed near City Hall in 2013.

=== Regional events ===
Events include:

- Adirondack Balloon Festival, founded in 1973, a four-day hot air balloon festival in the Glens Falls area, with events at the Floyd Bennett Memorial Airport and Crandall Park.
- The Adirondack Stampede, a Professional Rodeo Cowboys Association charity rodeo.
- Lower Adirondack Regional Arts Council June Arts Festival, held annually since 1972.
- New York State Boys' Public High School Basketball Tournament, founded in 1981.
- The Third Thursday Glens Falls Art Walk.

== Sports ==
Glens Falls has a tradition of minor league hockey. The highly successful Adirondack Red Wings, four-time Calder Cup champions of the American Hockey League, played in the city from 1979 to 1999. When the parent Detroit Red Wings disbanded the franchise, it was replaced by the Adirondack IceHawks of the United Hockey League, which was renamed "Frostbite" in 2004 before it folded in 2006. From 2009 to 2014, the city was the home to the AHL's Adirondack Phantoms, the principal farm team of the Philadelphia Flyers. On May 16, 2014, the Calgary Flames announced the Adirondack Flames would be their AHL affiliate. The Flames played one season before the AHL underwent a large realignment before the 2015–16 season and the Calgary Flames moved their AHL team to Stockton, California (renamed to Stockton Heat) and moved their ECHL team to Glens Falls, called the Adirondack Thunder who are currently a minor league affiliate of the New Jersey Devils.

Glens Falls' East Field is home to the Glens Falls Greenjackets of the Empire Football League. The Greenjackets started in 1928 and is the second oldest-active semi-pro football team in the country. The Greenjackets are 2008 & 2009 NAFL Empire Division Champions (10–0) and the 2009 NAFL North Atlantic Region Champions (14–0), and finished the season at 14–1 as the NAFL Eastern Conference Runners-up, 2009 NAFL Elite 8.

The city is also home to the Glens Falls Dragons, a baseball team playing in the Perfect Game Collegiate Baseball League, a collegiate summer baseball league. Since the team's inception in 2003 it has played at East Field.

== Parks and recreation ==
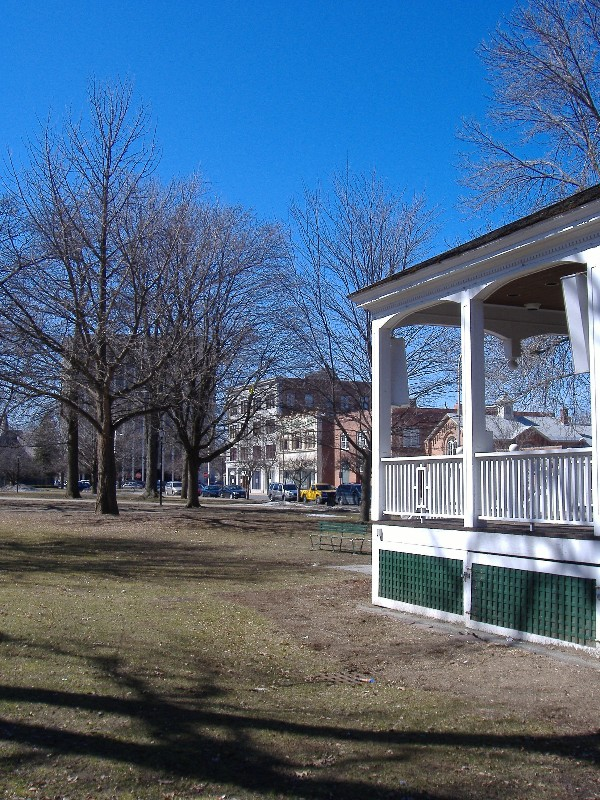
City Park

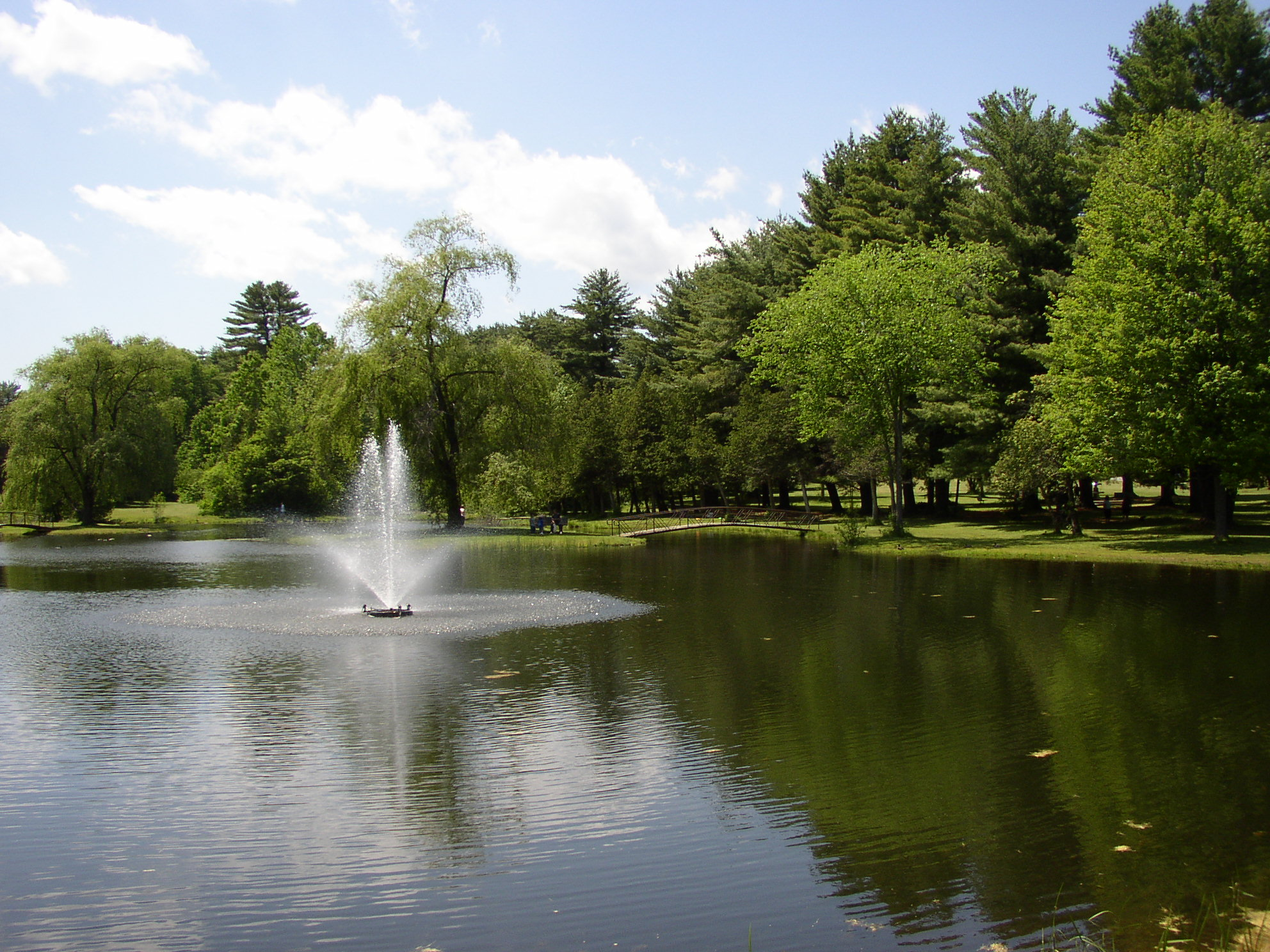
Crandall Park from US Route 9

City Park is located in the city's business district and contains the public library.

Crandall Park has a lowland pond, war monuments and recreation facilities bordering the city's Coles' Woods International Ski Trail system

Glens Falls Civic Center opened in 1979 and hosts sports and entertainment events in downtown Glens Falls; it includes an arena for sporting events, concerts, family activities, dance, theater and trade shows as well as banquet facilities. The Adirondack Thunder and Adirondack Junior Thunder play here. The facility was renamed Cool Insuring Arena in 2017 and Harding Mazzotti Arena in 2025. Past teams include the Adirondack Wildcats basketball team of the USBL, and the one year (1994) roller hockey franchise Empire State Cobras, as well as the ice hockey teams Adirondack Flames, Adirondack Frostbite, Adirondack Phantoms, and the Adirondack Red Wings.

East Field is home to the Glens Falls Dragons, of the Perfect Game Collegiate Baseball League; the Greenjackets semi-pro football team, the second oldest football team in America formed in 1928; and the Glens Falls High School Indians. It was home to the Glens Falls White Sox and Glens Falls Tigers of the Eastern League, the Glens Falls Redbirds of the New York–Penn League and the Adirondack Lumberjacks of the Northeast League/Northern League East.

== Government ==
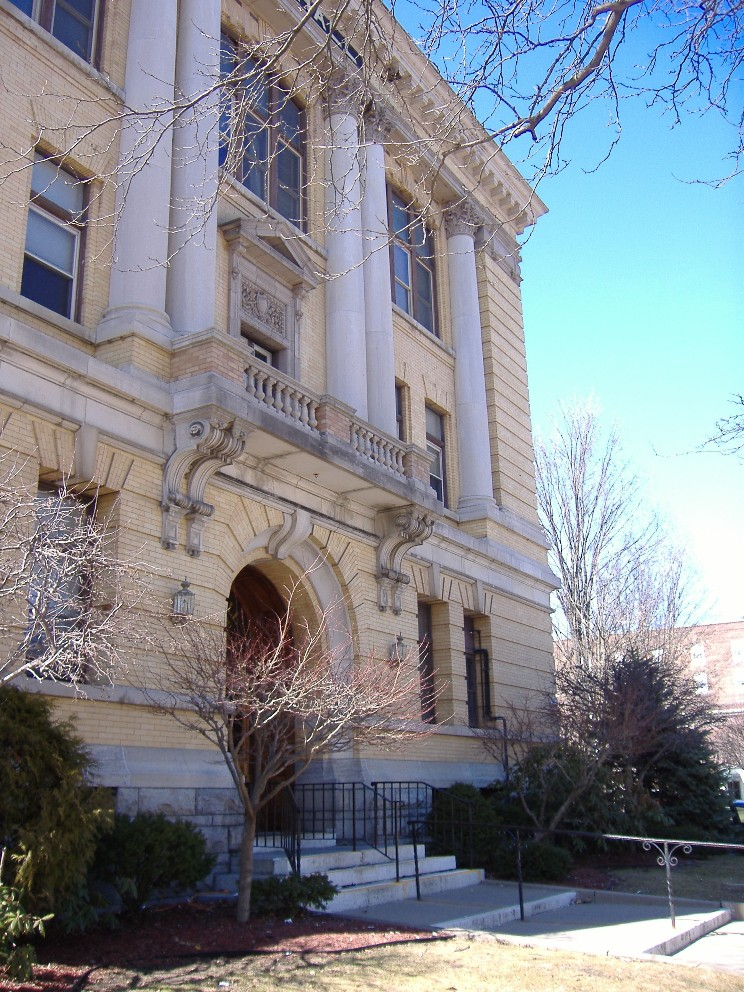
Glens Falls City Hall

Glens Falls, since incorporation as a city in 1908, has had a strong mayor charter. The city's Common Council has six members; one is elected to represent the city at large while the other five are elected from wards. The city is represented on the Warren County Board of Supervisors by five supervisors; one supervisor is elected from each Common Council ward. Such "city ward supervisors" do not have any duties in city government but have all the rights and privileges as any other member of the County Board.

Departments of the City include: Cemetery, Community, Fire, Police, Public Works, Purchasing, Recreation, Controller, Assessment, Civil Service, Clerk, Water & Sewer, and Buildings and Codes.

List: Mayors of Glens Falls as a city
- Charles W. Cool, 1908–09
- Samuel D. Kendrick, 1910–11
- W. Irving Griffing, 1912–15 and 1920–21
- Edward Reed, 1916–20 (died in office)
- Julius Jacobson, 1920 (interim)
- Charles W. Cool, 1922–23
- Charles H. Hitchcock, 1924–25
- Orville C. Smith, 1926–31
- Earle H. Stickney, 1932–33 and 1936–39
- W. Irving Griffing, 1934–35
- John Bazinet, 1940–49
- Milton G. Tibbitts 1950–51 and 1954–57
- J. Ward Russell, 1952–53 and 1958–61
- Harry Helm, 1962–63
- James E. Wallace, 1964–65
- James J. Donnelly, 1966–69
- Robert J. Cronin, 1970–77
- Edward M. Bartholomew, 1978–85
- Francis X. O'Keefe, 1986–93
- Vincent J. DeSantis, 1994–97
- Robert A. Regan, 1998–2005
- LeRoy B. Akins Jr, 2006–2008 (died in office)
- John "Jack" Diamond, May 10, 2008–2017 (Acting Mayor until election; elected Mayor November 4, 2008 for final year of term of Mayor Akins; reelected 2009 for a full term)
- Daniel L. Hall, 2018–2021
- Bill Collins, 2022–2025
- Diana Palmer, 2026–present

== Education ==
The city falls within two school districts, both of which are independent of the city government. The majority of the city falls within the Glens Falls City School District, which includes parts of the town of Queensbury.

The Glens Falls City School District operates Glens Falls High School, a middle school and four neighborhood elementary schools (Sanford Street School, Big Cross School, Jackson Heights School and Kensington Road Elementary School). Sanford Street School was closed at the end of the 2010–2011 school year.

The Glens Falls Common School District operates an independent public elementary school, Abraham Wing Elementary School, named for a founder of Glens Falls. Saint Mary's–Saint Alphonsus Regional Catholic School serves children in pre-kindergarten through grade eight as a regional parochial school.

== Media ==
=== Print ===
The Post-Star is a daily newspaper printed in Glens Falls with a daily circulation of approximately 27,000. The paper covers Glens Falls and Saratoga as well as the surrounding towns and counties of Warren, Saratoga and Washington. Established in 1895, it has been published since 1909. Writer Mark Mahoney won the 2009 Pulitzer Prize in Journalism (Editorial Writing) for his editorials on local government secrecy.

The Chronicle is a free weekly newspaper with a summer distribution up to 37,000. It was founded in 1980.

=== Radio ===
==== AM ====
- WMML/1230
- WWSC/1450

==== FM ====
- WLJH/90.7
- WGFR/92.7
- WBLN-LP/104.9

=== Television ===
Glens Falls is part of the Albany/Schenectady/Troy television market. One low-powered station originates from Glens Falls, WNCE-CD (TV-31).

== Infrastructure ==
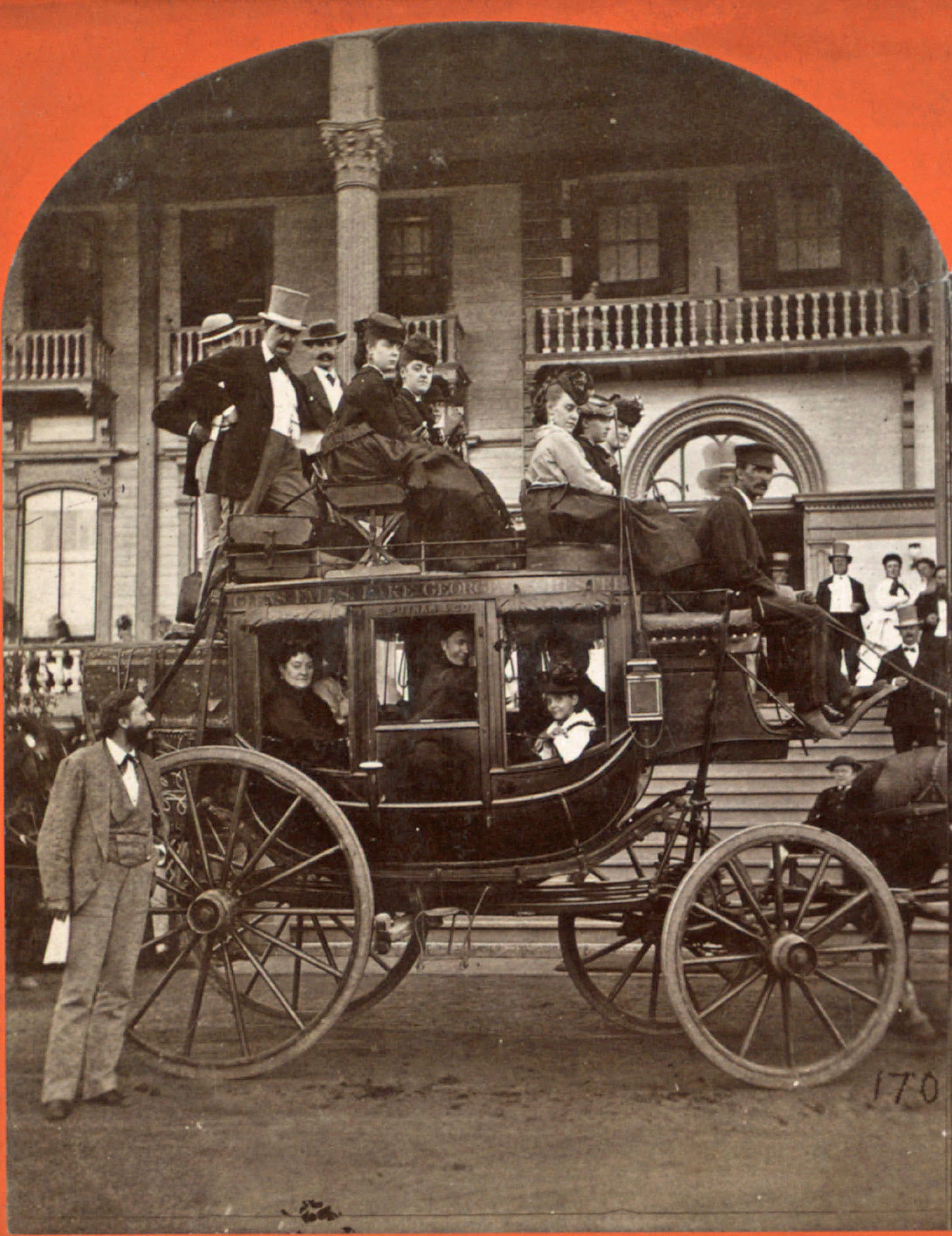
Glens Falls, Lake George and Chester stagecoach, circa 1880

=== Transportation ===
==== Air ====
Floyd Bennett Memorial Airport is public-use airport northeast of the city.

==== Bus ====
Capital District Transportation Authority provides bus service for the city and surrounding communities.

==== Roads ====
- U.S. Route 9 – known as Glen Street throughout Glens Falls.
- New York Route 32
- New York Route 9L

Glens Falls has a radial street pattern originating from its colonial settlement.

== Notable people ==
- Charles Reed Bishop - a prominent banker, politician, and philanthropist in the Kingdom of Hawaii who married Princess Bernice Pauahi Bishop and co-founded the Kamehameha Schools, the Bishop Museum, and Hawaii's first chartered bank, the Bank of Hawaii.
- George S. Brown (1801–1886) – first African American pastor in the former Troy Annual Conference
- Joseph Bruno – former Majority Leader of New York State Senate; born in Glens Falls
- George H. Chase (1843–1918) - Member of the 1st Arizona State Legislature.
- Bradshaw Crandell - illustrator and Hollywood portrait artist; born in Glens Falls
- Douglass Crockwell (1904–1968) - artist and filmmaker (Glens Falls Sequence, 1946); moved to Glens Falls in 1933
- John Alden Dix – 41st governor of New York (1911–1913), born in Glens Falls
- Laura Don – born Anna Laura Fish at Glens Falls, actress-manager and playwright
- "Hacksaw" Jim Duggan – professional wrestler of Mid-South, WWF and WCW fame, Glens Falls native
- Lisa Eichhorn – actress, born in Glens Falls
- Warren Angus Ferris (1810–1873) – explorer of the American West and early surveyor of Dallas
- George Fitch – member of the Wisconsin State Senate
- Jimmer Fredette – former combo guard for Brigham Young University's basketball team and consensus 2011 college player of the year; Glens Falls native
- Joseph Girard III – college basketball player for Clemson University
- Ferris Greenslet – editor of the Atlantic Monthly (1902–07), born in Glens Falls
- Carlyle Harris – convicted murderer; executed in 1893 for poisoning his wife
- Lionel Hitchman – professional hockey player, 1929 Stanley Cup champion, died in Glens Falls
- Charles Evans Hughes – Governor of New York (1907–1910), presidential candidate (1916), and Chief Justice of the United States Supreme Court (1930–1941); born in Glens Falls
- Thomas M. Jacobs – Olympic Nordic skier
- Frederick Avery Johnson – Member of Congress, village president
- Dave LaPoint – retired Major League Baseball pitcher and 1982 World Series champion; owner of Dave LaPoint's Pitchers bar formerly on South Street; Glens Falls High School graduate
- Betty Little – State Senator serving 45th Senate District (includes Glens Falls); born in Glens Falls but resides in Queensbury
- Rob Loughan – entrepreneur and investor
- Peter Mahovlich – retired All-Star hockey player; was on four Stanley Cup-winning teams; member of Canada's Sports Hall of Fame; resides in Glens Falls
- Barry Melrose – former head coach of the NHL's Tampa Bay Lightning and Los Angeles Kings, television commentator, former co-owner of Adirondack Frostbite UHL team and former coach of Adirondack Red Wings AHL team, both of which were based in Glens Falls
- Lorrie Moore – O. Henry Award-winning author
- Scott Murphy – U.S. Representative (2009–2011) for New York's 20th congressional district, which includes Glens Falls; Murphy also lives in Glens Falls
- Algernon Sidney Paddock – Secretary of Nebraska Territory and Governor of Nebraska; United States Senator; born in Glens Falls
- Dave Palmer – retired Major League Baseball pitcher
- Johnny Podres – pitcher for the Brooklyn and Los Angeles Dodgers; retired to Glens Falls region
- Edward C. Prescott – 2004 Nobel Prize in Economics, Glens Falls High School class of 1958
- Edgar Preston Richardson – art historian and director of the Detroit Institute of Arts and Winterthur Museum, Garden and Library
- Ed Reulbach – MLB pitcher with the Chicago Cubs during the early 1900s; 1907 and 1908 World Series champion; died in Glens Falls
- Robert Rheinlander – noted architect and designer of several prominent Glens Falls buildings
- Rochelle Saidel – author, activist, and founder of the Remember the Women Institute
- Powel J. Smith – member of the New York State Assembly, City Chamberlain
- Gerald B. H. Solomon – United States Representative from New York (1979–1999)
- Kate White – former editor-in-chief of Cosmopolitan Magazine; identifies Glens Falls as her hometown

== In popular culture ==
- The 1982 film Basket Case was partially filmed in Glens Falls.
- Glens Falls and the natural formation of the bedrock beneath it served as inspiration to James Fenimore Cooper in his historical novel The Last of the Mohicans (1826).
- In The Witch of Hebron (2010) by James Howard Kunstler, several characters visit Glens Falls.

== Sister cities ==
- – Saga, Japan
