= Saratoga Springs Public Library =

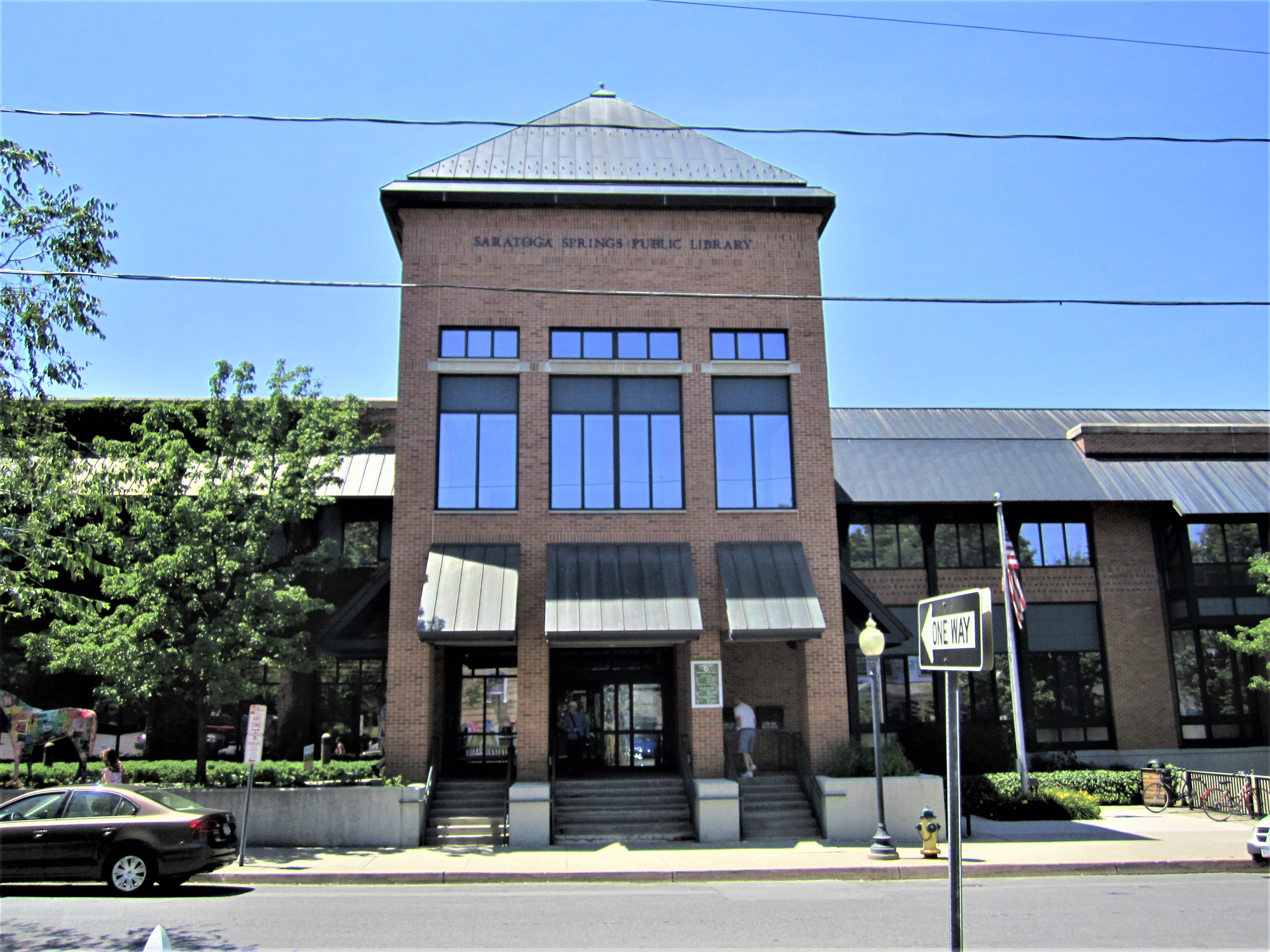
- (2013)
- 43.0811°N 73.7832°W
- Location: 49 Henry Street; Saratoga Springs, New York
- Established: 1950

Collection
- Size: 220,000

Access and use
- Circulation: 508,964 (loaned in 2012)
- Population served: 52,091
- Members: 48,000

Other information
- Budget: US $6,057,860 total operating (FY 2023 - 2024)
- Director: A. Issac Pulver
- Employees: 105, 59 FTE
- Website: sspl.org

Saratoga Springs Public Library (SSPL), established in 1950, is a public library located in Saratoga Springs in the Capital District area of New York. SSPL serves the Saratoga Springs City School District.

== Services and facilities ==
The three-story building on Henry Street that now houses the library was opened in 1995. SSPL offers a wide variety of services in the building and via the web site. The library offers a collection of current, high demand print and non-print items, including books on tape or compact discs, DVDs, as well as access to online electronic information resources, downloadable audiobooks, ebooks and videos, and much more. The library provides public computer access to library card and non-card holders, printing, 3D printing, scanning, faxing, and free WiFi.

Librarians are available to respond to the information needs of customers who walk-in or phone-in with questions. SSPL also provides Ask-A-Librarian, an email reference service. Individuals who wish to research their own information needs can also browse through the dozens of reference pages known as LibGuides.

The library offers Wireless capability, a coffee shop, and The Friends Book Shop bookstore selling used paperback and hardbound books.

=== Programs ===
The library offers free programs and activities for all ages. Some recurring offerings include:

- English Language Learning and Adult Basic Literacy
- Book clubs (internally called Book Groups)
- Paws4Reading partner program with certified therapy dogs
- Story times

=== The Saratoga Room ===
The Saratoga Room is a collection of local history resources, maps, monographs, manuscripts, books, pamphlets, primary sources, and audio-visual materials on the Saratoga Springs local history. The creation of the Spa State Park and preservation of the springs. Examples are a history of the effort to preserve the springs, The Politics of Hydrotherapy and the Development of a New York State Policy written by local resident and former Saratoga Spa State Park employee Ed Murphy, and the "Frank Sullivan Collection" of books written by humorist Frank Sullivan or inscribed to him by his famous friends. This room is open Monday, Wednesday, Friday 9-5, Tuesday, Thursday 9-9, Saturday 1-5.

The library is part of the Southern Adirondack Library System, providing an integrated online catalog and interlibrary loan among thirty-six libraries in Saratoga, Warren, Washington, and Hamilton counties.

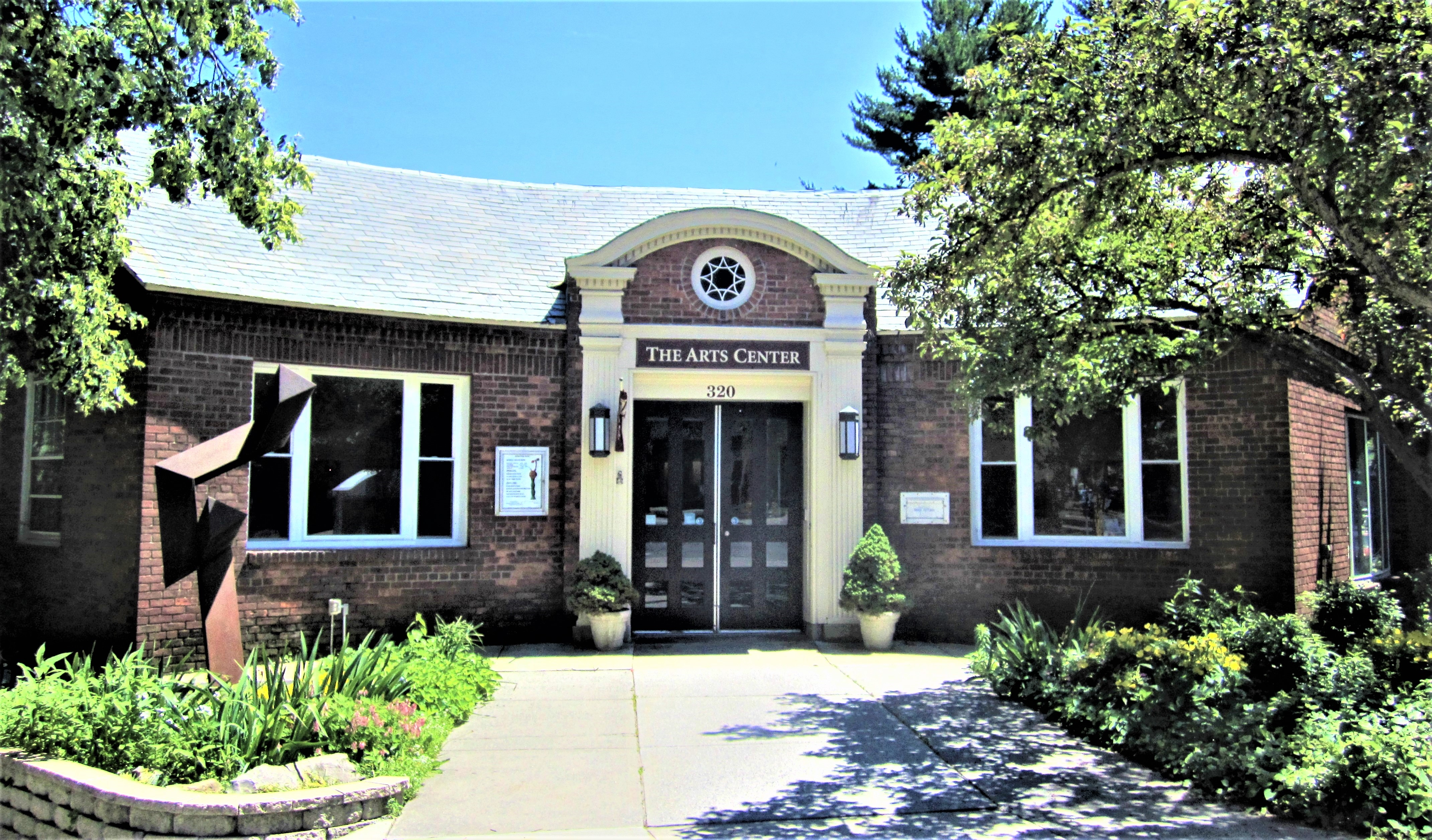
Former library building 1950-1995, 320 Broadway, Saratoga Springs, now The Arts Center of Saratoga Arts

== History ==
The first library in Saratoga Springs, the Saratoga Athenaeum, was a private subscription library founded in 1885 by a group that included Spencer Trask and Joseph Drexel among others. This library was first located on the corner of Broadway and Caroline Street, and moved to 344 Broadway in 1906.

In 1945 voters approved a proposal to construct a public library, which opened at 320 Broadway at the intersection of, Spring Street in a corner of Congress Park, in 1950. When this library opened students from the Saratoga Springs school district carried the books down Broadway to their new home.

The library's current building at 49 Henry Street broke ground in 1993 and opened in 1995. It was designed by Architecture Plus of Troy, New York and The LA Group and Phillips Associates of Saratoga Springs.

== Parking ==
The Saratoga Springs Public Library is located in downtown, nestled between Henry and Putnam Streets. As of 2024 the City of Saratoga Springs implemented summer paid parking. Paid parking runs from Memorial Day through Labor Day and affect six city-owned, off-street parking facilities. General information about parking restrictions and exceptions can be found here.

The library's Putnam Street parking lot has several restrictions enacted by the city during the time between Memorial Day and Labor Day:

- Between 9 am and 6 pm, all parking in the library parking lot, including in the 15-minute and handicap accessible spaces, is restricted to library parking lot permit holders only.
- Between 9 am and 9 pm, parking is free for library parking lot permit holders.
- While the City of Saratoga Springs Seasonal Paid Parking program is in effect, non-permit holders will pay $2 per hour or fraction thereof between 6 pm and 9 am, and all parkers will pay $2 per hour, or fraction thereof, between 9 pm and 9 am, and on holidays when the library is closed.
