= WCQL =

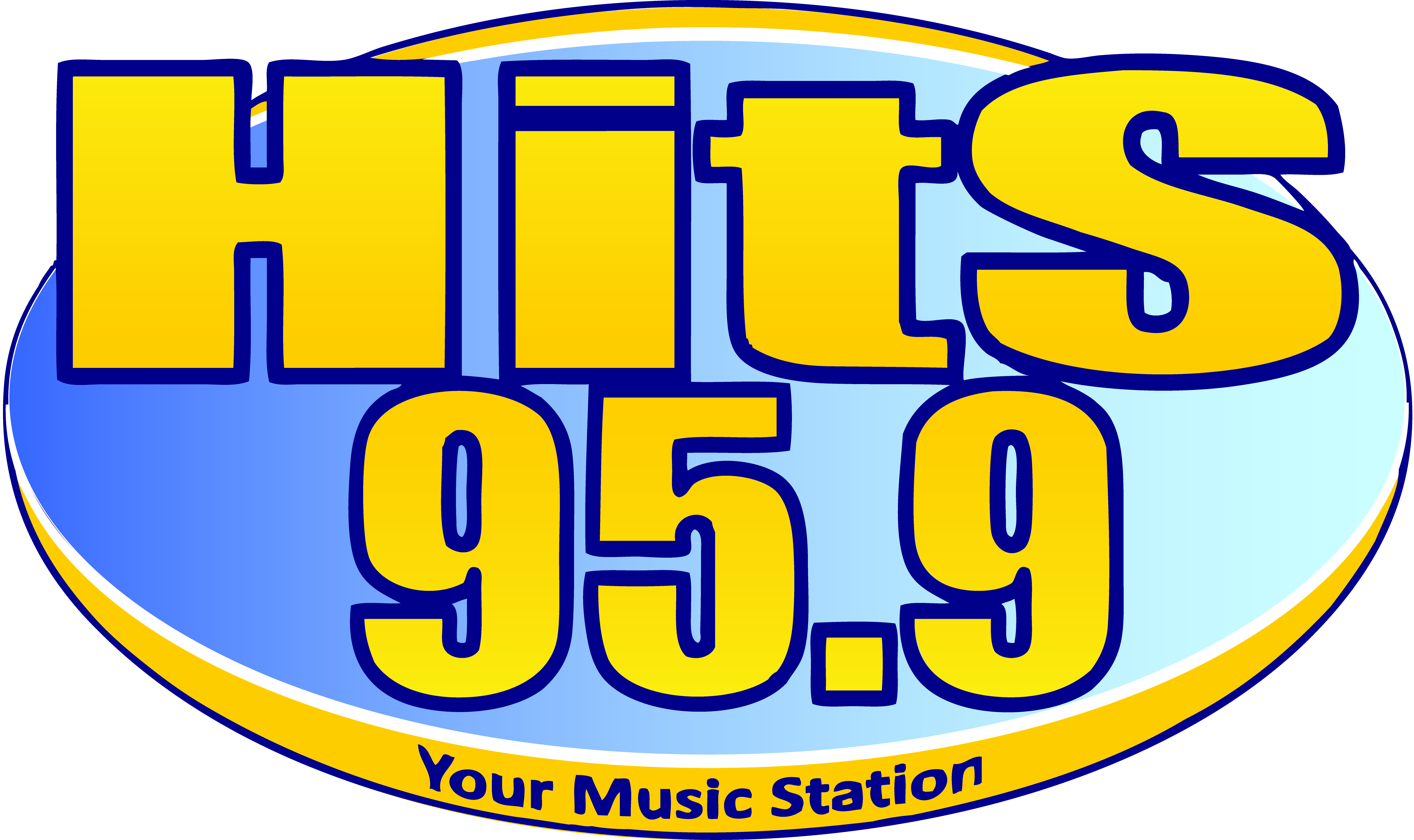
- Queensbury, New York; United States
- Broadcast area: Saratoga/North Country
- Frequency: 95.9 MHz
- Branding: Hits 95.9

Programming
- Format: Adult Top 40 (CHR)
- Affiliations: Adirondack Thunder

Ownership
- Owner: Regional Radio Group, LLC
- Sister stations: WCKM-FM, WWSC

History
- First air date: September 1967 (as WWSC-FM)
- Former call signs: WWSC-FM (1967–1978); WYLR-FM (1978–1997)
- Call sign meaning: Variation on "Cool" (allusion to previous slogan)

Technical information
- Licensing authority: FCC
- Facility ID: 36767
- Class: A
- ERP: 380 watts
- HAAT: 388 meters (1,273 ft)
- Transmitter coordinates: 43°25′12.2″N 73°45′35.4″W

Links
- Public license information: Public file; LMS
- Webcast: Listen live
- Website: hits959.com

WCQL (95.9 FM) is a radio station broadcasting an Adult Top 40 (CHR) format. Licensed to Queensbury, New York, United States, the station serves the Saratoga Springs/Glens Falls area. The station is currently owned by Regional Radio Group, LLC and features live and local programming Program Director John Pratt hosts the Hit Hot Breakfast in the morning as well as overseeing the rest of the staff at their location in Queensbury, New York.

== History ==
The radio station began operations in September 1967 as WWSC-FM, originally licensed to Glens Falls, New York, and simulcasting MOR formatted WWSC. In 1978, the call letters were changed to WYLR-FM, and the format to a syndicated, automated top 40 format called "The Love Rock", although the station still simulcast WWSC in the morning. The format was flipped to automated album-oriented rock in 1981. The daily simulcast with WWSC ended completely in 1982 when a live morning show was added. During the 1980s the station added live midday and afternoon drive shifts.

The format changed to an early version of hot adult contemporary in 1984, followed by dance top 40 in 1988 and then classic rock in 1991 as Y96. In late 1995, the format was changed to country (as North Country 95.9), but this only lasted until late 1997, when the station was sold, and the format was returned to classic rock, with the new call letters WCQL and the Cool Rock 95.9 branding. Classic rock lasted this time on WCQL for over seven years, until May 2005, when the station tweaked towards active rock due to new classic rock competition from the much more powerful classic hits-formatted WNYQ (105.7 FM). In September 2005, the station flipped to its current Top 40 format, Hits 95.9, due to competition from modern rock-leaning hot AC station WKBE (100.3 FM). Due to WNYQ's move to Malta, New York, the station's community of license was changed to Queensbury in 2006.

== Logos ==
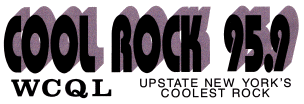
Former logo used between late 1997 and February 2002

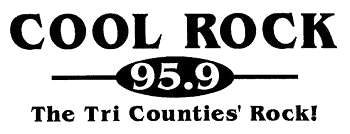
Former logo used between March 2002 and December 2003

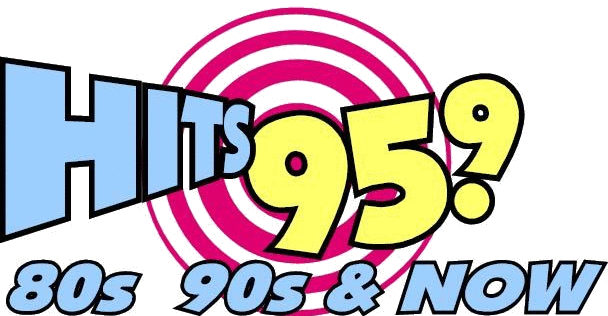
Former logo used between September 2005 and December 2009

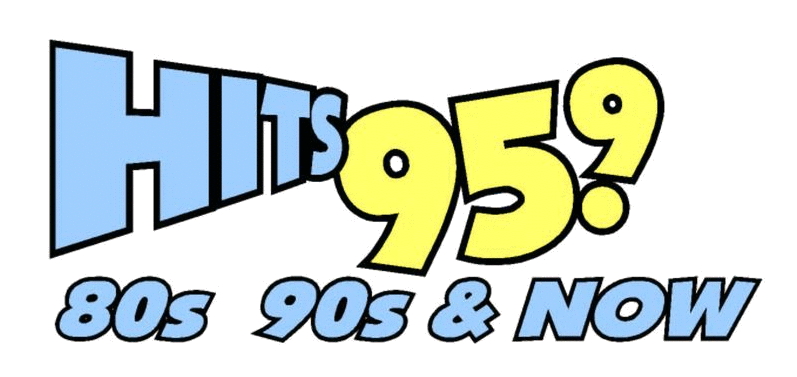
Former logo used in 2010 and 2011
