= Zopher Delong House =

Historic house in New York, United States

- U.S. National Register of Historic Places
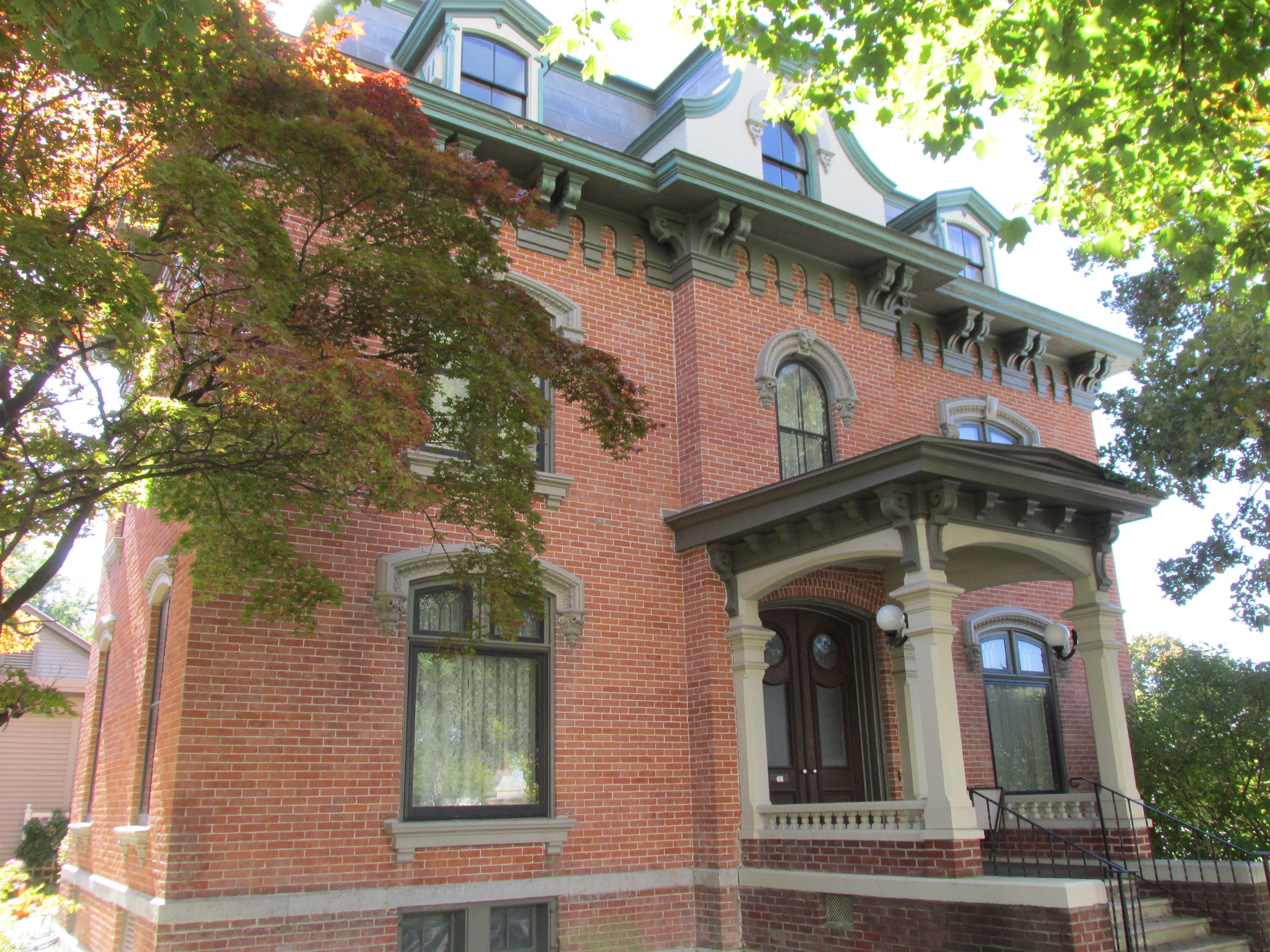
- Zopher Delong House

- Location within New York Location within the United States
- Location: 348 Glen St., Glens Falls, New York
- Coordinates: 43°18′40″N 73°38′12″W
- Area: less than one acre
- Built: 1870
- Architect: Cummings, Marcus F.
- Architectural style: Second Empire, Italianate
- MPS: Glens Falls MRA
- NRHP reference No.: 84003261
- Added to NRHP: September 29, 1984

Zopher Delong House is a historic home located at Glens Falls, Warren County, New York, United States. It was built about 1870 and is a 2 1/2-story, three-bay brick residence with a frame service wing. It has Italianate- and Second Empire–style design elements, including a mansard roof. It features a 2-story central pavilion and bracketed entrance portico. Also on the property is the original carriage house. It is maintained as a historic house museum known as the Chapman Historical Museum by the Glens Falls-Queensbury Historical Association.

It was added to the National Register of Historic Places in 1984.

== See also ==
- Chapman Historical Museum
- National Register of Historic Places listings in Warren County, New York
