= Rob Loughan =

American entrepreneur (born 1965)

- Born: Robert Michael Loughan; July 11, 1965 (age 61); Glens Falls, New York, U.S.
- Education: University at Albany, SUNY
- Occupation: Entrepreneur

Robert Michael Loughan (born July 7, 1965) is an American entrepreneur and investor. As a co-founder of Octane Software, he is best known for the 3.2 billion dollar sale of the company in 2001. Rob Loughan co-founded the venture capital firm Sagus Capital Partners, Dexterra Inc, and is the co-owner of the award-winning organic winery, Thistle Hill Winery in Mudgee, NSW Australia. He is also the co-founder of Baldface Lodge in British Columbia which GQ Magazine named as one of the top ten hippest hotels. Currently, he runs the capital investment firm, Loughan Group Inc. Loughan is the founder of Incroud, a platform for musicians to share music and apparel with fans; Flawless Photonics, which is pioneering supply chains in space producing transparent optical fibers; and Ferret, an app that uses AI to provide full information on potential business partners, associates, and other key relationships.
