= Chapman Museum =

History museum in Glens Falls, New York, U.S.

Coordinates: 43.3116°N 73.6490°W

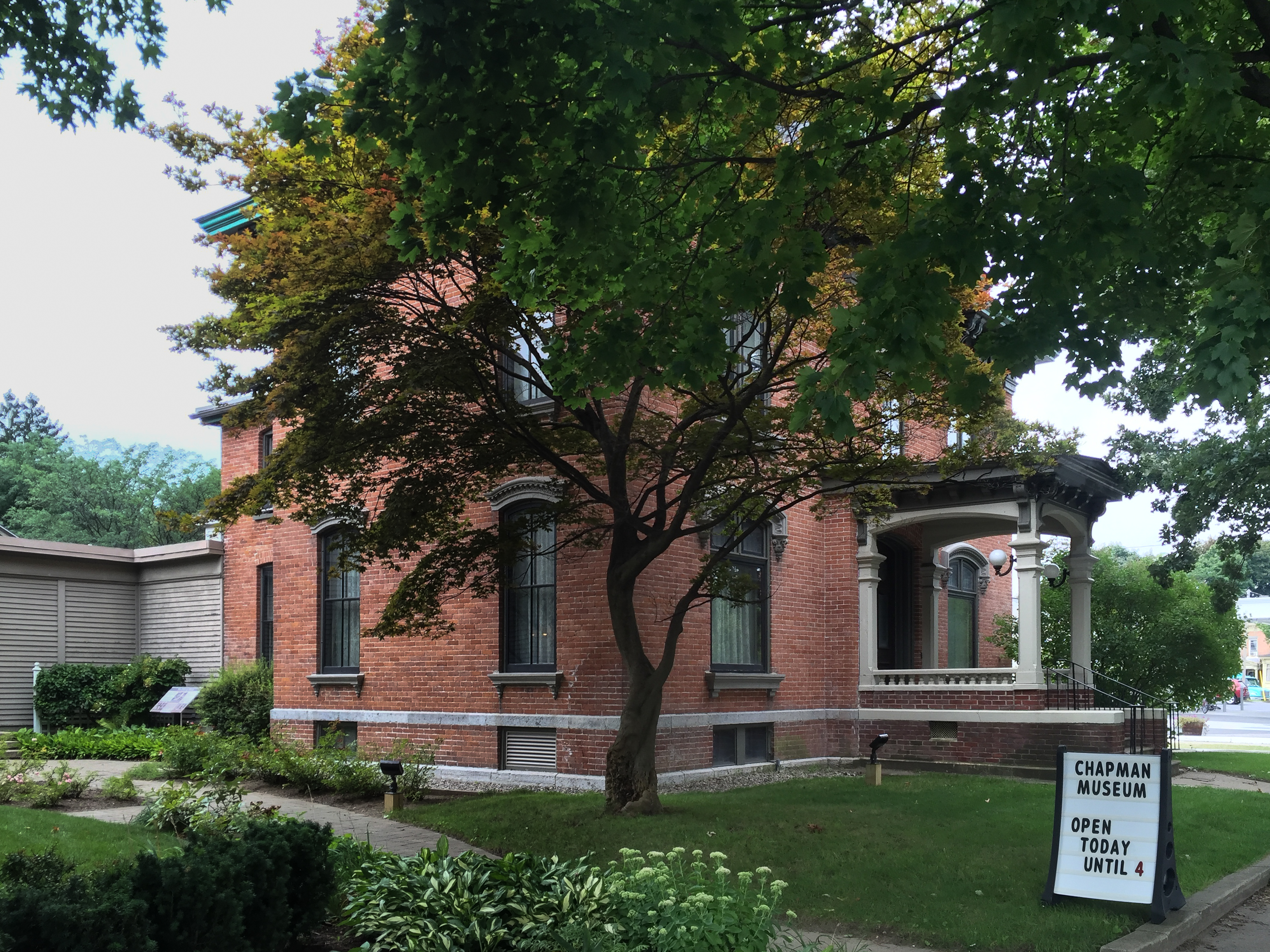
- Former name: Chapman Historical Museum
- Established: 1968
- Location: 348 Glen Street, Glens Falls, New York, United States
- Type: Regional History
- Website: https://www.chapmanmuseum.org

The Chapman Museum presents the history of the Glens Falls – Queensbury community and its connection to the Adirondack region. By encouraging discovery, understanding, and appreciation of the region's heritage, the museum provides perspective for the present and the future. The museum is owned and operated by the Glens Falls-Queensbury Historical Association. The historic home attached to the museum was originally built by Zopher DeLong who made his living as a hardware merchant in Glens Falls.

== Overview ==
In 1867, Glens Falls hardware merchant Zopher DeLong remodeled a modest wood-frame home on Glen Street, building the two story brick structure with a mansard roof seen by visitors today. Following Zopher's death in 1901, his son John took over the home and remodeled it to reflect his desire for modern tastes and conveniences.

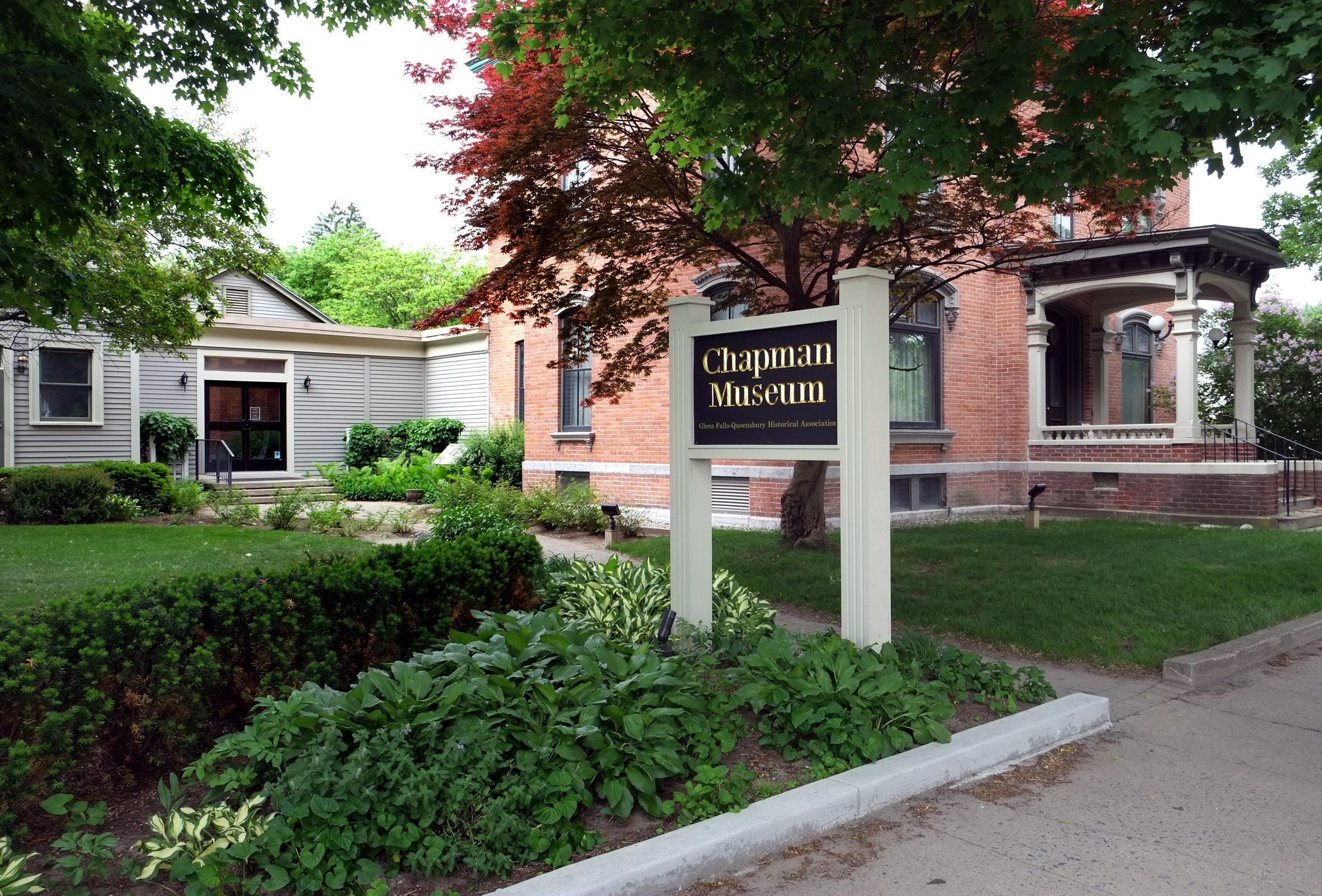
Exterior of the Chapman Museum located in Glens Falls, New York.

Six decades later, Juliet Chapman, a relative by marriage, donated the house to the community to become a local history museum. The organization received a permanent charter from the New York State Board of Regents in 1968. The DeLong House was added to the National Register of Historic Places in 1984. In the years since, the Chapman Museum has added an exhibition gallery, climate controlled collections storage, a research room, multi-purpose classroom, and a museum shop.

== Funding ==
The museum receives funding from various local, state, and federal organizations.

== See also ==
- Zopher Delong House
- Historic house museum
- National Register of Historic Places listings in Warren County, New York
- The Hyde Collection
