= Round Lake Library =

Library in Saratoga County, New York

Coordinates: 42.936680°N 73.794420°W

The Round Lake Library is located in the village of Round Lake, New York, United States. The village is located in Saratoga County, northeast of Schenectady.

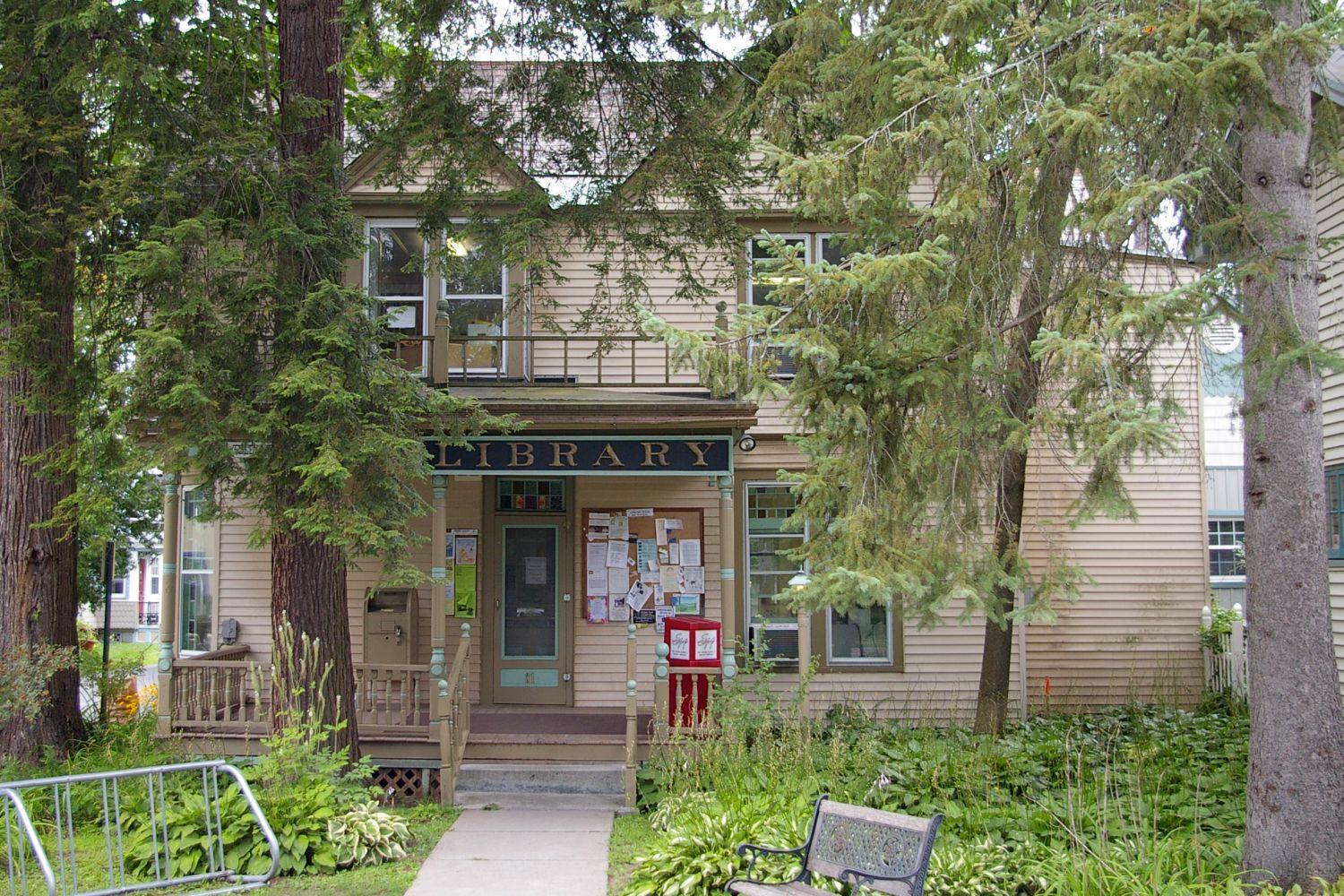
The "Clark House", the Round Lake Library location in Round Lake village, NY

The Round Lake Library was established in 1897 by the Woman's Round Lake Improvement Society (WRLIS), a not-for-profit organization of men and women from the community who sponsor activities to improve the village. The mission of WRILS was "to make Round Lake desirable and attractive as a place of residence and in all ways to study to keep pace with the progressive spirit of the age."

== History ==
The Round Lake Library was originally known as The Free Library and Reading Room and opened July 6, 1897 with 400 books donated by residents of the village. It was the second library in Saratoga County and the first to have its own building. WRILS rented the Clark House for $150 per year in order to house the Library and the building was bequeathed to the Library after its owner, Caroline Garnsey, died. The Library's first three librarians were members of the same family: Louise Lodewick Stevens, followed by her daughter Grace Powers and then her granddaughter Dorothy Northup in 1954.

The Village of Round Lake has decorative wooden homes crowded closely together and while this makes for a quaint community, it also created a fire hazard. On July 10, 1921, 17 buildings were destroyed as a result of a fire that started in a cottage located on the Library lawn. The Library was one of the few buildings that was not completely destroyed. The Round Lake Library is still housed in its original Victorian-style building at 31 Wesley Avenue. The Kate VanDembers Memorial Committee Room was added following the loss of the social room in the 1921 fire and the WRILS meeting room was added later.

In 1908, New York State aided the Library in instituting and using the Dewey Decimal Classification. In 1955, the Vischer Ferry Library donated many books to the Round Lake Library's collection, which significantly enhanced its offerings. The Round Lake Library was also the first Library in Saratoga County to join the Southern Adirondack Library System (SALS) in 1957, a voluntary association of public libraries in Hamilton, Saratoga, Warren and Washington Counties. As a result, the Library received funding for books, equipment and reference materials and by 1968 it offered the borrowing of books, records, art prints and films, as well as providing reference services and eventually interlibrary loan services.

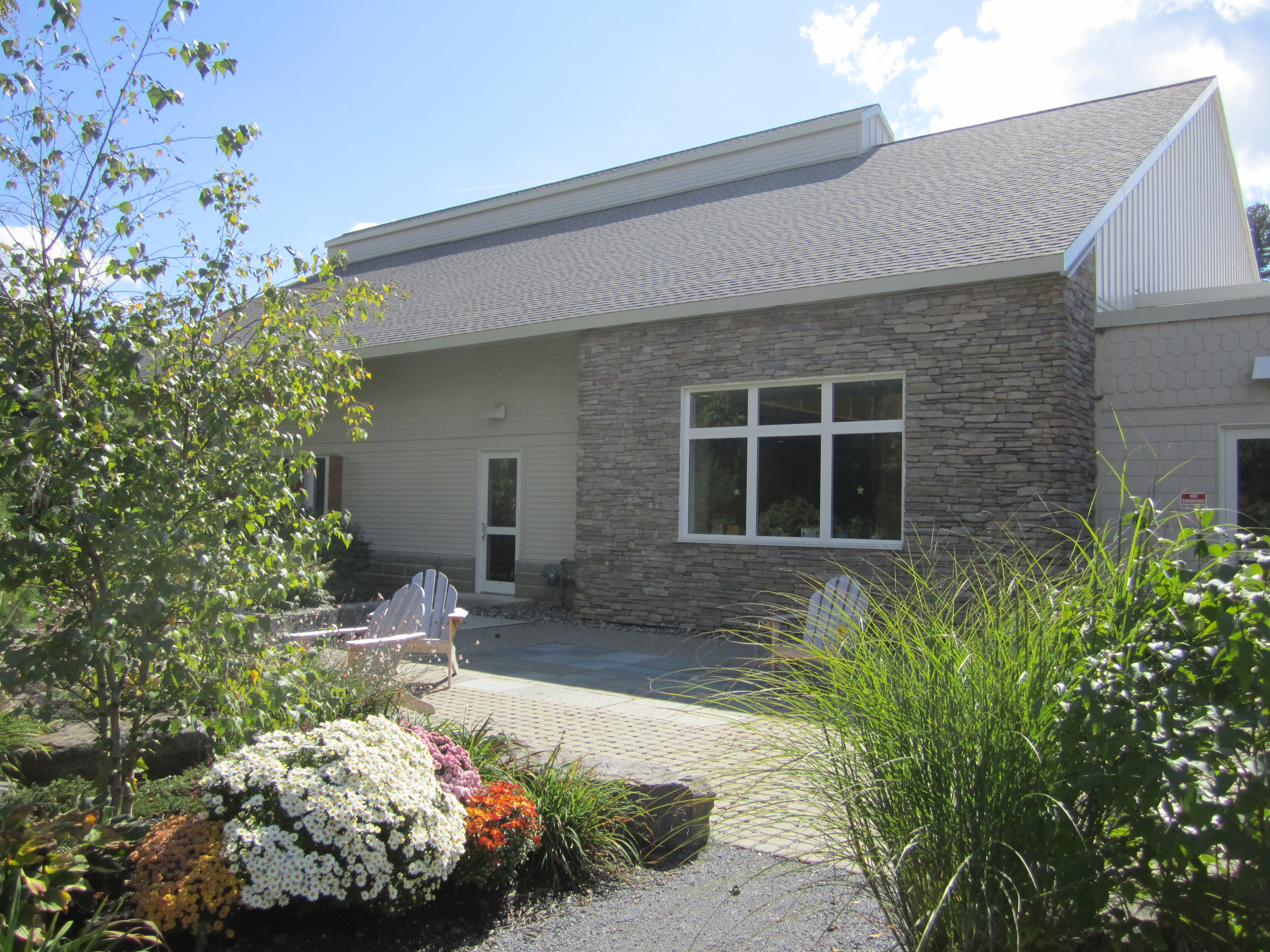
Round Lake Library Malta Branch in Malta, NY

In 2009 the Round Lake Library opened a branch in the David Meager Community Center in Malta.

== Today ==
WRILS continues to support the Round Lake Library today, primarily through proceeds of the annual antiques and arts and crafts festivals. The society also sponsors the Round Lake Victorian Village House Tour and story hours for children. The Town of Malta began its financial support to the Library in 1965 with a gift of $1000. This amount has steadily grown and is now approximately $53,000 per year. The Library is chartered by the New York State Education Department Board of Regents to serve the village of Round Lake and the town of Malta.

Although the Round Lake Library is housed in cozy quarters, it is prepared to meet the needs of its residents and patrons in the twenty-first century. It offers non-fiction, fiction and children books (including a distinct Victoriana and Parenting collection), audiobooks, videotapes and DVDs, musical recordings on CD, children computers, eAudiobooks, an updated medical reference section, Internet access, online Library Catalog and databases, Inter-Library Loan services, fax machine and copier, a book shop as well as meeting space for non-profit groups.

Round Lake Library Statistics from 2006:
Library Materials Owned: 18,194
Library Materials Borrowed: 47,317
Library Visits: 16,697
Programs Held: 87
Public Computers: 3

== Notes ==
- Round Lake Association 1868-1968" booklet compiled by Women's Round Lake Improvement Society for Centennial Celebration August 11–17, 1968.
- "Round Lake: Little Village in the Grove" by Mary Hesson, David J. Rogowski and Marianne Comfort (1998)
- Library, Public. "Town of Malta - Public Library". www.malta-town.org. Archived from the original on April 17, 2011.
- http://directory.sals.edu/index.php
