= The Sagamore =

- The Sagamore Resort
- U.S. National Register of Historic Places
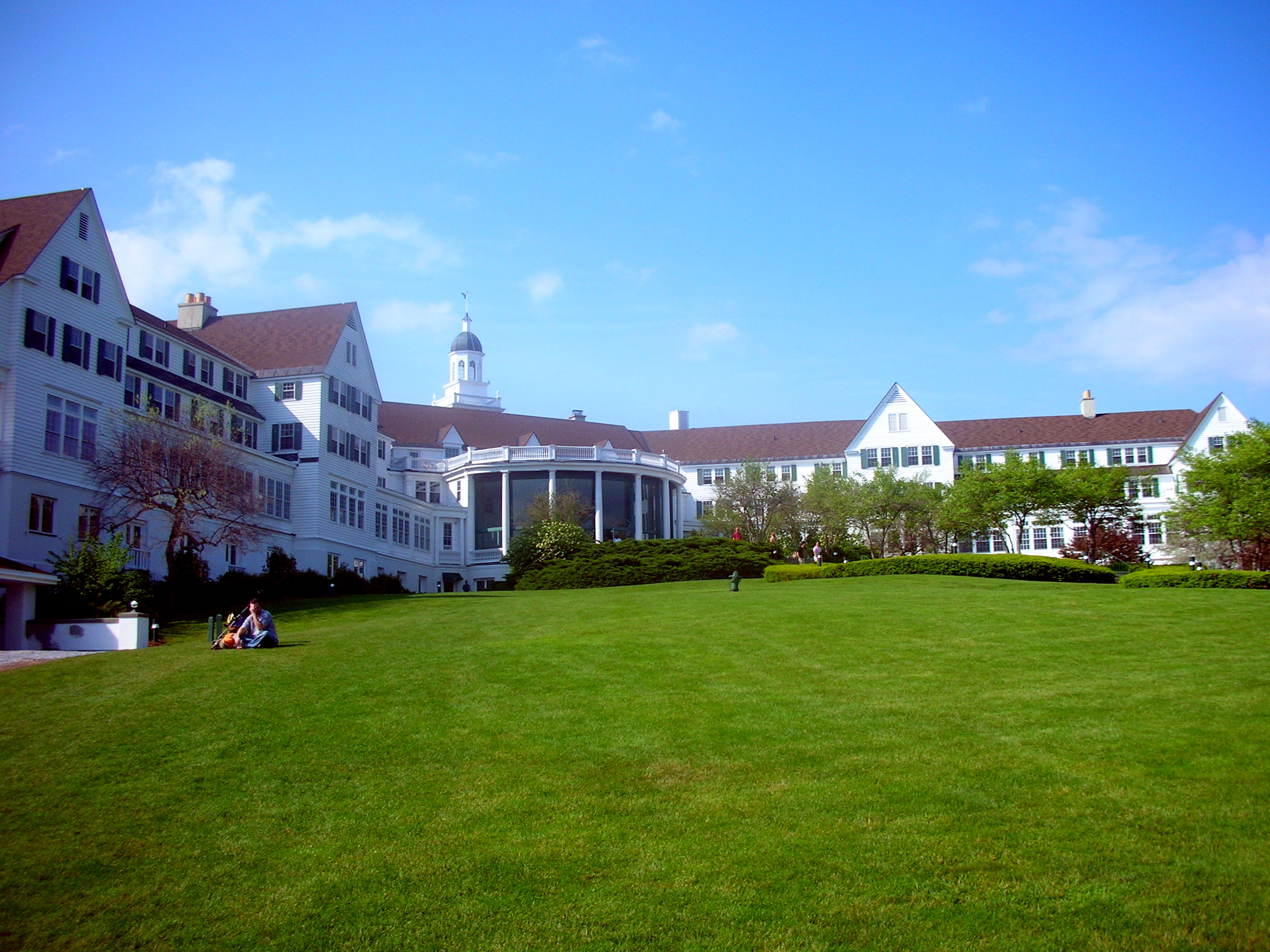
- Lakeside view of the Sagamore Hotel
- Nearest city: Bolton Landing, New York
- Coordinates: 43.555834873606564°N 73.64559615711279°W
- Built: 1882 (144 years ago)
- Architect: Multiple
- Architectural style: Colonial Revival, Queen Anne
- NRHP reference No.: 83001824
- Added to NRHP: 21 July 1983 (43 years ago)

The Sagamore is a Victorian-era resort hotel located on Lake George in Bolton Landing, New York. It occupies the private Green Island on Lake George. Since 1983, it has been listed in the National Register of Historic Places.

The Sagamore is a member of Historic Hotel of America, the official program of the National Trust for Historic Preservation.

== History ==
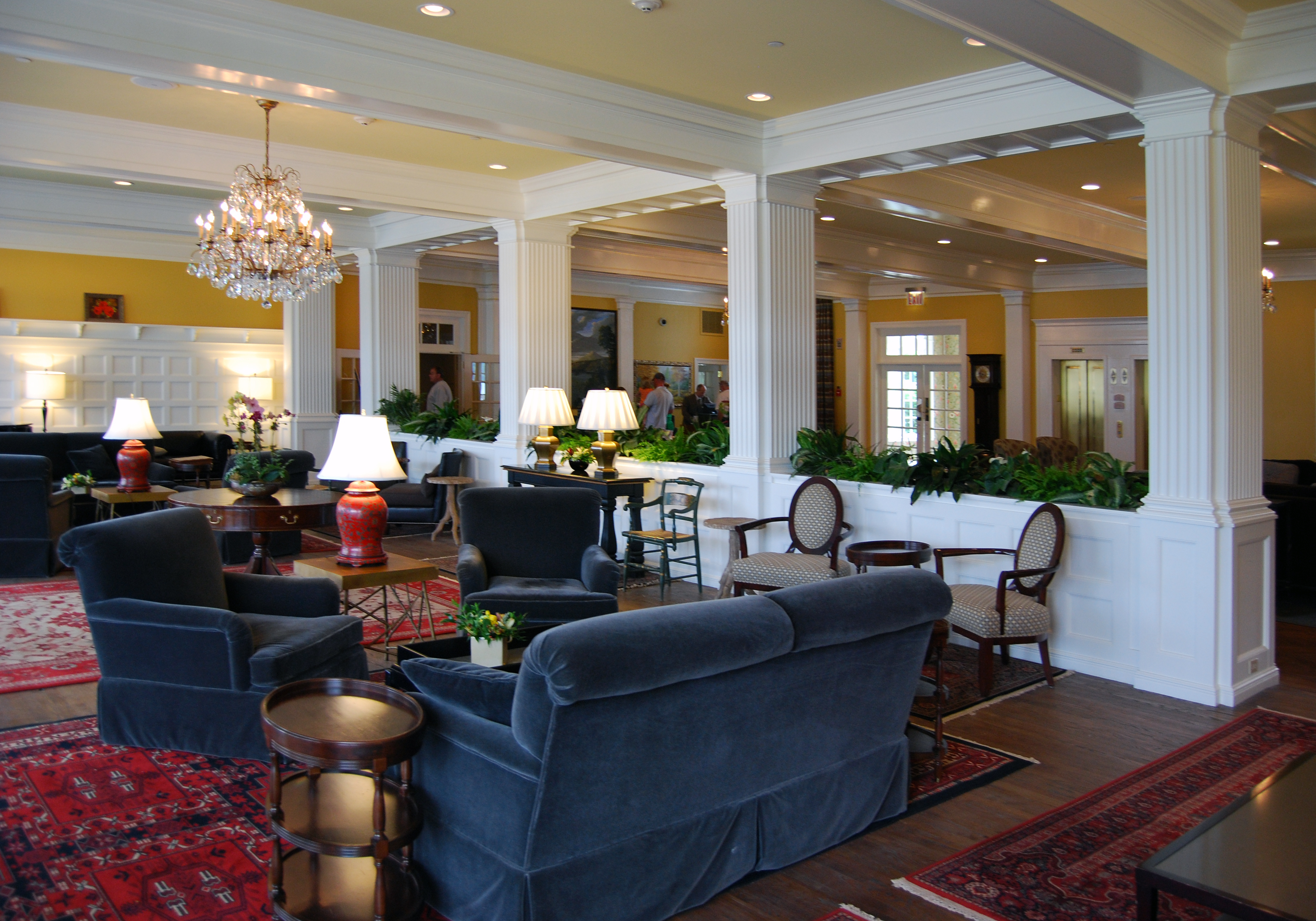
Lobby interior.

The Sagamore opened in 1883. It was financed by Myron Brown and five other investors who formed the Green Island Improvement Company, bought Green Island and started building a new hotel in the fall of 1882.

The hotel was named after "the Sagamore", an American Indian character in the James Fenimore Cooper novel The Last of the Mohicans (1826).

Twice damaged by fire, in 1893 and 1914, the Sagamore was rebuilt in the early 1920s. A group of investors including Dr. William G. Beckers of New York City, one of the hotel's early stockholders, Adolph Ochs, the owner and publisher of the New York Times, Dr. Willy Myers, a New York City surgeon and William H. Bixby, a St. Louis industrialist, hired prominent local architect and structural engineer Robert Rheinlander to oversee the effort.

The hotel eventually fell into disrepair before closing its doors in 1981. Two years later, builder and real estate developer Norman Wolgin of Philadelphia purchased the hotel and restored it. In the same year, the resort was listed in the National Register of Historic Places.

The resort is currently managed by Portsmouth, New Hampshire-based Ocean Properties, which bought it in 2008.

== See also ==
- List of Historic Hotels of America
