= Glens Falls National Bank =

Arrow Bank
- Type: Subsidiary
- Industry: Banking
- Founded: 1851; 175 years ago
- Headquarters: Glens Falls, New York, United States
- Number of locations: ▲38 (2025)
- Owner: Arrow Financial Corporation
- Website: www.gfnational.com

Arrow Bank is one of two subsidiary banks of the multi-bank holding company Arrow Financial Corporation (NASDAQ: AROW). The Bank was founded in 1851 in Glens Falls.

Arrow Bank provides commercial banking, investment, trust and insurance services to individuals, corporations, and government institutions in Warren, Washington, Essex, and Clinton Counties.

== History ==
Arrow Bank (previously Glens Falls National) opened in 1851, making it the first bank in Warren County. In 1864, a fire destroyed the bank. It was rebuilt following the fire and re-opened as the Glens Falls National Bank in 1867.

On January 6, 1870, a group of thieves robbed the bank, using dynamite and wet blankets. Approximately $20,000 ($422,000 in 2021) was stolen.

Glens Falls acquired the Fort Edward National Bank in 1950, making it the bank's second branch. In 1963, Glens Falls built another Washington County branch in Fort Edward. The Fort Edward office of Glens Falls National Bank was officially opened on July 21, 1971.

In December 2021, Glens Falls National Bank closed its Fort Edward branch.

In 2026 Arrow bank was merged with Adirondack Bank in a $89.1 million deal.
