= Southern Adirondack Library System =

Library consortium in New York, US

Coordinates: 43.074521°N 73.785173°W

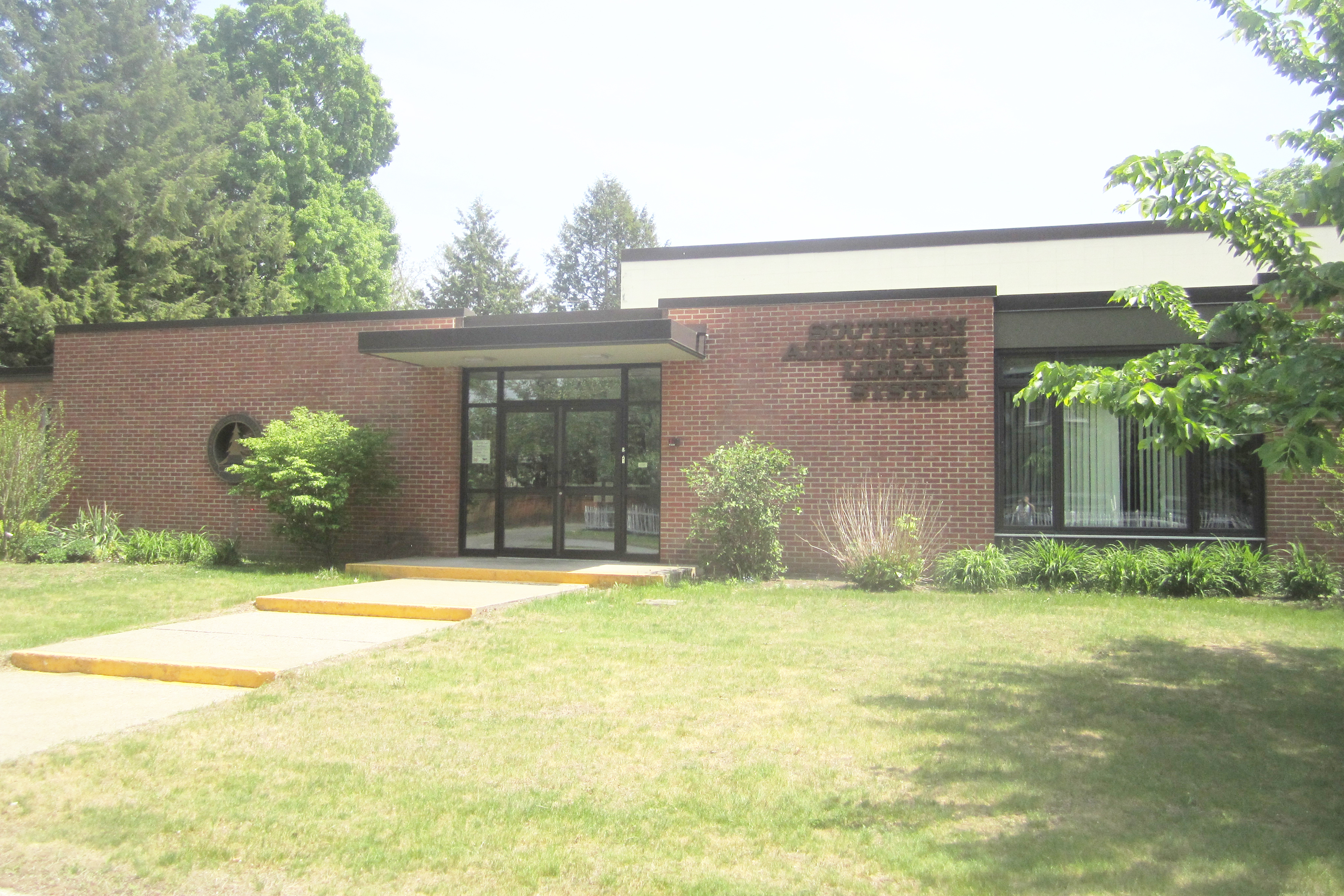
Headquarters of the Southern Adirondack Library System in Saratoga Springs, New York

The Southern Adirondack System (SALS) is a consortium of thirty-four libraries in Saratoga, Warren, Washington, and Hamilton counties in New York.

SALS is one of 23 public state-supported library systems in New York. It was chartered in 1959 by the New York State Board of Regents. It provides a consolidated online catalog and interlibrary loan services for its member libraries.

== Member libraries ==
=== Saratoga County ===
- Ballston Spa Public Library
- Burnt Hills--Town of Ballston Community Library
- Corinth Free Library
- Clifton Park-Halfmoon Public Library
- Galway Public Library
- Round Lake Library/Malta Branch
- Mechanicville District Public Library
- Hadley-Luzerne Public Library
- Round Lake Library
- Saratoga Springs Public Library
- Stillwater Free Library
- Schuylerville Public Library
- Waterford Public Library

=== Warren County ===
- Bolton Free Library
- Brant Lake - Horicon Free Public Library
- Caldwell-Lake George Library
- Town of Chester Public Library
- Glens Falls - Crandall Public Library
- Town of Johnsburg Library
- Stony Creek Free Library
- Warrensburg - Richards Library

=== Washington County ===
- Argyle Free Library
- Cambridge Public Library
- Easton Library
- Fort Edward Free Library
- Granville - Pember Library and Museum
- Greenwich Free Library
- Hudson Falls Free Library
- Salem - Bancroft Public Library
- Whitehall Free Library

=== Hamilton County ===
- Town of Inlet Public Library
- Town of Indian Lake Public Library
- Long Lake—Cornelius Vanderbilt Whitney Long Lake Public Library
- Town of Lake Pleasant Public Library
- Raquette Lake Free Library
