= Round Lake (village), New York =

Round Lake
- Village
- Village of Round Lake
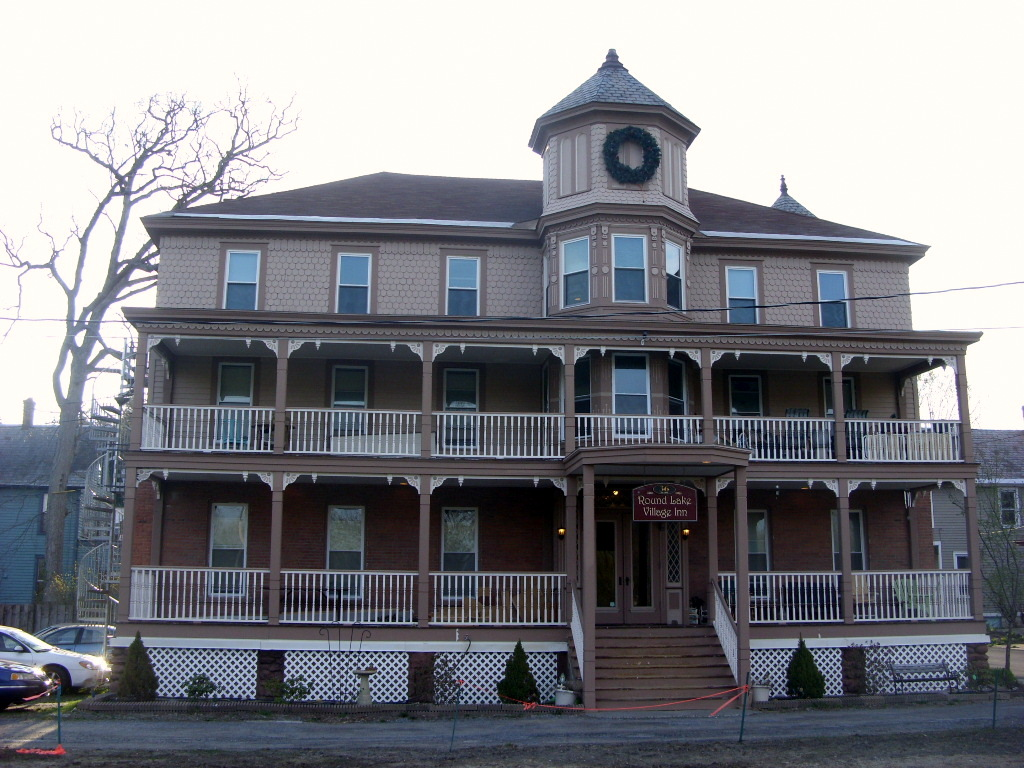
- Round Lake Village Inn, April 2009

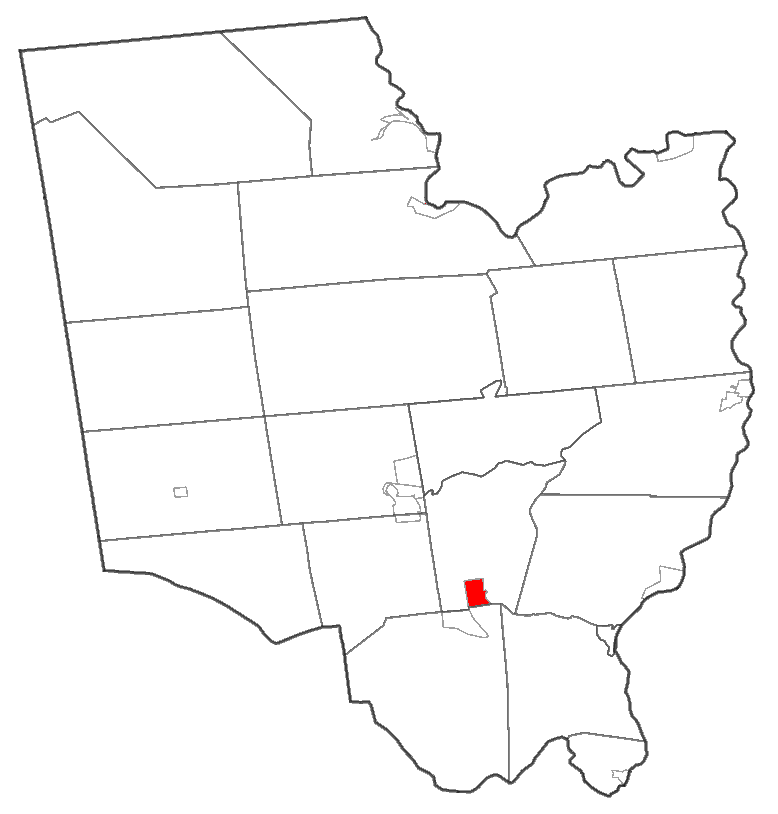
- Map highlighting Round Lake's location within Saratoga County.

- Location within the state of New York Round Lake (the United States)
- Coordinates: 42°56′12″N 73°47′37″W
- Country: United States
- State: New York
- County: Saratoga
- Settled: 1867
- Village: 1969

Government
  - Mayor: Gary Putman

Area
  - Total: 1.23 sq mi (3.18 km^{2})
  - Land: 1.12 sq mi (2.91 km^{2})
  - Water: 0.11 sq mi (0.28 km^{2})
- Elevation: 160 ft (50 m)

Population (2020)
  - Total: 828
  - Density: 737.7/sq mi (284.82/km^{2})
- Time zone: UTC-5 (Eastern (EST))
  - Summer (DST): UTC-4 (EDT)
- ZIP code: 12151
- Area code: 518
- FIPS code: 36-63957
- GNIS feature ID: 0962980
- Website: http://www.roundlakevillage.org/
- Round Lake Historic District
- U.S. National Register of Historic Places
- U.S. Historic district
- Nearest city: Round Lake, New York
- Built: 1865
- Architect: Drube, H.
- Architectural style: Second Empire, Gothic, Stick/Eastlake
- NRHP reference No.: 75001225
- Added to NRHP: April 24, 1975

Round Lake is a village in Saratoga County, New York, United States. The population was 828 at the 2020 census. The name is derived from a circular lake adjacent to the village. In 1975, the Round Lake Historic District, which encompasses the village, was added to the National Register of Historic Places.

The Village of Round Lake is in the Town of Malta.

== History ==
The village began in 1867 as a summer camp meeting locale for groups of Methodists. At first, visitors lived in tents, while visiting ministers could rent space in the second story of the meeting's passenger station. By 1868 more permanent structures including cottages, a two-story trustees office and bookstore, and a market appeared. The village was owned and governed by the Round Lake Association. By 1881 lectures patterned after Chautauqua Institution were being conducted. In 1887 George West constructed the George West Museum of Art and Archaeology to enhance the cultural offerings.

Among the noted Methodist residents was Rev. Strong, creator of the tome Strong's Bible concordance until his death.

The 1980-pipe Ferris Tracker organ, originally built in 1847 for Calvary Episcopal Church in New York City, was moved to the Round Lake Auditorium in 1888 and is considered to be the oldest and largest three-manual organ in existence. The organ is still used for musical programs today.

By mid 20th century, declining interest in the cultural activities of the Round Lake Association led to its demise in the 1960s. The museum was dismantled in 1965. After the association was dissolved, the village was incorporated in 1969 to take its place.

== National Register listing for Round Lake Historic District ==
- Round Lake Historic District *** (added 1975 - District - #75001225)
- U.S. 9, Round Lake and
- Historic Significance: Information Potential, Architecture/Engineering, Event
- Architect, builder, or engineer: Drube, H.
- Architectural Style: Gothic, Second Empire, Stick/Eastlake
- Area of Significance: Philosophy, Religion, Architecture, Historic - Non-Aboriginal, *Community Planning And Development
- Cultural Affiliation: Not Available
- Period of Significance: 1850-1874, 1875–1899
- Owner: Private, Local Gov't
- Historic Function: Domestic, Religion
- Historic Sub-function: Religious Structure, Single Dwelling
- Current Function: Domestic
- Current Sub-function: Single Dwelling

== Geography ==
Round Lake is located at 42°56′12″N 73°47′37″W (42.936784, -73.793661).

According to the United States Census Bureau, the village has a total area of 1.2 square miles (3.1 km^{2}), of which 1.1 square miles (2.8 km^{2}) is land and 0.1 square miles (0.26 km^{2}) (7.69%) is water.

The village is located on the western side of a lake called Round Lake. Little Round Lake is a smaller lake, northeast of Round Lake and connected by a short passage. New York State Route 67 passes the northeastern side of the lake.

U.S. Route 9 passes through the eastern side of the village and Interstate 87, the Adirondack Northway, is one-half mile to the west. County Roads 80 and 823, passing through the village, link US-9 to the Northway.

== Demographics ==
Historical population
Census	Pop.	Note	%±
1970	886		—
1980	791		−10.7%
1990	765		−3.3%
2000	604		−21.0%
2010	623		3.1%
2020	828		32.9%
U.S. Decennial Census

As of the census of 2000, there were 604 people, 257 households, and 160 families residing in the village. The population density was 558.7 inhabitants per square mile (215.7/km^{2}). There were 280 housing units at an average density of 259.0 per square mile (100.0/km^{2}). The racial makeup of the village was 96.19% White, 0.50% African American, 0.83% Native American, 1.16% Asian, and 1.32% from two or more races. Hispanic or Latino of any race were 0.99% of the population.

There were 257 households, out of which 32.3% had children under the age of 18 living with them, 47.5% were married couples living together, 12.5% had a female householder with no husband present, and 37.7% were non-families. 30.4% of all households were made up of individuals, and 10.1% had someone living alone who was 65 years of age or older. The average household size was 2.35 and the average family size was 2.96.

In the village, the population was spread out, with 25.3% under the age of 18, 6.0% from 18 to 24, 31.0% from 25 to 44, 26.5% from 45 to 64, and 11.3% who were 65 years of age or older. The median age was 38 years. For every 100 females, there were 88.8 males. For every 100 females age 18 and over, there were 84.1 males.

The median income for a household in the village was $43,409, and the median income for a family was $49,375. Males had a median income of $35,859 versus $30,750 for females. The per capita income for the village was $20,320. About 1.3% of families and 2.6% of the population were below the poverty line, including 1.1% of those under age 18 and 8.0% of those age 65 or over.

== Fire Department ==
The Round Lake Hose Company was founded in 1886 as the M.B. Sherman Hose Company, with a Constitution that required active members have ‘good moral character’ and live within a mile of the community. The first firehouse was situated on Troy Avenue near the intersection of Burlington Avenue. A two-wheeled cart carried two sizes of hose, which were rolled up on a wheel axle and had a long pole with enough handles for seven men to pull it along if necessary. Another two wheeled cart, with a bell mounted on the axle, would proceed ahead of the hoses to sound a warning. The modern Round Lake Hose Company operates two fire stations, housing a total of eleven pieces of apparatus. The membership consists of 65 volunteer men and women who continue to respond to emergencies in the village as well as within the town of Malta and town of Ballston. Additionally, a 1926 Childs fire truck which was purchased from the village of Ballston Spa in 1945 is maintained as a unique parade piece representing their history.

== See also ==
- Round Lake Library
- List of Registered Historic Places in Saratoga County, New York
