= SUNY Adirondack =

Community college in Queensbury, New York, U.S.

- Former name: Adirondack Community College
- Type: Public community college
- Established: 1961; 65 years ago
- Parent institution: State University of New York
- President: Anastasia L. Urtz
- Undergraduates: 2,683 (fall 2025)
- Location: Queensbury, New York, United States; 43.353056°N 73.653333°W
- Campus: Suburban 114 acres (0.46 km^{2})
- Colors: Yellow, Green, and White
- Nickname: Timberwolves
- Sporting affiliations: National Junior College Athletic Association, Region III, Mountain Valley Collegiate Conference
- Mascot: Eddie Rondack
- Website: www.sunyacc.edu

SUNY Adirondack is a public community college in Queensbury, New York. It serves residents in Warren, Washington and northern Saratoga counties in New York State with over 30 academic programs of study. It was founded in 1961 as Adirondack Community College (ACC). Bachelor's and master's degree programs became available with the opening of the SUNY at Plattsburgh Queensbury Branch on the SUNY Adirondack campus. It adopted its present name on March 1, 2010.

== History ==
This school was founded in 1961 as Adirondack Community College, to provide higher education to residents of Warren and Washington counties and beyond.

In 1983, the Adirondack Community College Foundation was established to provide student scholarships.

The college is now branded as SUNY Adirondack.

== Campus ==
=== Office and service buildings ===
Warren Hall houses the business office, the financial aid office, payroll, office of the registrar, Barbara Green, the Interim Dean of Student affairs, the admissions office, and the office of accessibility services which provides assistance to students with disabilities.

Student Center houses the school bookstore, a cafeteria, a student lounge with big-screen TV, a pool table, and a number of couches, chairs, and tables for students to relax or sleep. It also houses the Student Engagement & Diversity Initiative office, which is home to the SUNY Adirondack Student Senate as well as the College Activity Board.

=== Classroom buildings ===
Eisenhart Hall is the oldest classroom building on campus. A major renovation was completed in April 2006, including a new geothermal heating system, as it used to have poor climate control. It now also houses a SUNY Plattsburgh lecture hall. Primarily business classes are taught in this building: Accounting, Marketing, Management, Hospitality, Conventions and Events Planning, QuickBooks, Human Resource Management, Entrepreneurship, social science classes are taught in this building: psychology, sociology, history, and political science, though other classes are taught here as well.

Washington Hall is next to Eisenhart Hall and is home to nursing labs, the radio station (WGFR), the television studio (for instructional use), a video editing lab, photography labs and darkroom, and a Mac lab for graphic design/media arts students.

Dearlove Hall houses the Visual Arts Gallery, art studios, math lab, English and mathematics classrooms. The 3rd floor contains computer networking (Cisco Academy), IT:End User Support classrooms and tech. The offices of most English and Math professors are located in the basement of this hall. Art, language arts, and mathematics courses are primarily taught in this building. There is also an art gallery and a small lecture hall.

Scoville Building houses a small café, the library, the computer center, a computer lab, and the computer classrooms. There are only a few non-computer classrooms here, which mainly provide room for overflow from Eisenhart Hall. The top floor houses the Office of the President (Kristine Duffy, Ed. D). The library contains more than 63,000 books, including over 5,000 reference books, and subscribes to over 340 journals and other periodicals.

Adirondack Hall is an academic building that contains all science labs, a performance auditorium, and several music classrooms. Music lessons for 17 instruments and private voice are available for credit to all students, regardless of major.

The Regional Higher Education Center houses the extension centers of SUNY Plattsburgh, Empire State and Paul Smith's College. It also contains several classrooms.

=== Dormitories ===
New student housing was furnished in the Fall of 2013.

== Student life ==
The Student Senate and the College Activity Board (CAB) provide a variety of activities and events including monthly movies.

Additionally, there are a number of clubs representing a variety of interests. Students can join:

- Adirondack Broadcast Association
- Anime Club
- Anthropology Club
- Black & Latinx Student Union
- Chi Alpha Bible Study
- College Activity Board
- Culinary Arts Club
- Data Matrix Zone (DMZ) Club
- Doctor Who "BADWOLF" Club
- Gaming Club
- International Club
- Media Arts Club
- Phi Theta Kappa Honor Society
- Pride Club
- Student Senate
- SUNY Adirondack Business Club
- SUNY Adirondack Car Club
- SUNY Adirondack Green Communities Club
- Theater Club
- Veteran's Club
- SUNY Adirondack ROCX (Outdoor/Adventure Sports)

== Athletics ==
SUNY Adirondack is a member of the NJCAA Region 3 Mountain Valley Athletic Conference and requires students be enrolled full-time and maintain a GPA of 2.0 or higher. The following are inter-collegiate, competitive teams:

- Men's Baseball
- Men's and Women's Basketball
- Bowling
- Cross Country
- Golf
- Men's and Women's Soccer
- Women's Softball
- Women's Volleyball
- Men's Lacrosse

== Notable former faculty members ==
- Jean Rikhoff, author and editor
