= WCKM-FM =

Radio station in Lake George, New York

WCKM-FM and WDKM
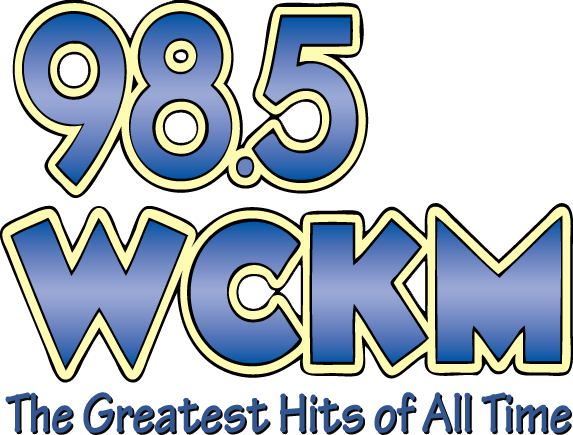

WCKM-FM: Lake George, New York; WDKM: Poultney, Vermont; United States
- Broadcast area: Adirondack Region
- Frequencies: WCKM-FM: 98.5 MHz; WDKM: 92.5 MHz
- Branding: 98.5 CKM

Programming
- Format: Classic hits
- Affiliations: ABC News Radio

Ownership
- Owner: Regional Radio Group, LLC
- Sister stations: WWSC; WCQL

History
- First air date: WCKM-FM: April 21, 1994; WDKM: September 9, 2016

Technical information
- Licensing authority: FCC
- Facility ID: WCKM-FM: 19650; WDKM: 190453
- Class: WCKM-FM: A; WDKM: A
- ERP: WCKM-FM: 370 watts; WDKM: 100 watts
- HAAT: WCKM-FM: 393 meters (1,289 ft); WDKM: −76 meters (−249 ft)
- Transmitter coordinates: WCKM-FM: 43°25′12.2″N 73°45′35.4″W; WDKM: 43°31′2.2″N 73°14′12.3″W

Links
- Public license information: WCKM-FM: Public file; LMS; WDKM: Public file; LMS
- Webcast: Listen live
- Website: www.wckm.com

WCKM-FM (98.5 MHz) and WDKM (92.5 MHz) are a pair of commercial FM radio stations simulcasting a classic hits format. The stations are owned by Regional Radio Group, LLC and features news and sports from ABC Radio.

WCKM-FM is licensed to Lake George, New York, and WDKM is licensed to Poultney, Vermont. They serve Essex, Hamilton, Saratoga, Warren and Washington Counties in New York and Rutland County, Vermont.
