= WWSC =

- Glens Falls, New York; United States
- Broadcast area: Glens Falls, New York
- Frequency: 1450 kHz
- Branding: 93 WSC The Legend

Programming
- Format: Classic rock
- Affiliations: Adirondack Thunder

Ownership
- Owner: Regional Radio Group, LLC
- Sister stations: WCKM-FM, WCQL

History
- First air date: December 18, 1946
- Call sign meaning: Warren, Washington, and Saratoga Counties

Technical information
- Licensing authority: FCC
- Facility ID: 49092
- Class: C
- Power: 1,000 watts day; 940 watts night
- Transmitter coordinates: 43°18′45.26″N 73°35′53.42″W
- Translator: 93.1 W226CP (Glens Falls)

Links
- Public license information: Public file; LMS
- Webcast: Listen live
- Website: 93wsc.com

WWSC (1450 AM) is a commercial radio station broadcasting a classic rock radio format. Licensed to Glens Falls, New York, it serves Warren, Washington, and northern Saratoga counties (from which the call letters are derived). It is owned by Regional Radio Group, LLC. It originally signed on in 1946.

WWSC is powered at 1,000 watts by day. It drops its power slightly to 940 watts at night to protect other stations on 1450 AM when radio waves travel further. Programming is also heard on FM translator 93.1 W226CP. It brands itself after the translator's dial position, "93 WSC".

== History ==
WWSC originally signed on the air on December 18, 1946. It was owned by Great Northern Radio with its studios at 11 South Street. It was a network affiliate of the Mutual Broadcasting System and later ABC. At first it was powered at only 250 watts. By the 1950s, the daytime power was boosted to 1,000 watts, while it continued to broadcast at 250 watts at night.

In 1959, WWSC was acquired by Normandy Broadcasting. It featured a full service middle of the road format of popular music, news and sports. In September 1967, it added an FM companion, WWSC-FM 95.9 (now WCQL in Queensbury). At first, this simulcast the AM station, then began airing an automated Top 40 playlist.

In the 1990s, as listeners increasingly turned to the FM band for music, WWSC completed its transition to a talk radio format. In addition to syndicated programming, local talk shows included Off the Rails with Gonzo Gates on Mondays and I'm In with the Adirondack Regional Chamber of Commerce Fridays. In 2008, it was acquired by the Regional Radio Group LLC.

WWSC featured coverage of local high school football, basketball and hockey. Its sports coverage garnered multiple New York State Broadcasters awards. It also aired Adirondack Thunder games from the ECHL.

On May 14, 2021, WWSC changed its format from talk to classic rock and rebranded as “93 WSC The Legend”.

== Translator ==
Call sign	Frequency	City of license	FID	ERP (W)	Class	Transmitter coordinates	FCC info
W226CP	93.1 FM	Glens Falls, New York	202883	250	D	43°19′31.2″N 73°39′5.4″W	LMS
