= Bill Horn =

Canadian ice hockey player

- Born: April 16, 1967 (age 59) Whitewood, Saskatchewan, Canada
- Height: 5 ft 8 in (173 cm)
- Weight: 165 lb (75 kg; 11 st 11 lb)
- Position: Goaltender
- Caught: Left
- Played for: Western Michigan; New Haven Nighthawks; Roanoke Valley Rebels; Detroit Falcons; Rochester Americans; San Diego Gulls; Greensboro Monarchs; Wheeling Thunderbirds; Raleigh Icecaps; Columbus Cottonmouths; Winston-Salem IceHawks; St. Pete/Winston-Salem Parrots
- NHL draft: 95th, 1986; Hartford Whalers
- Playing career: 1985–2003

William Horn (born April 16, 1967) is a Canadian ice hockey coach and retired goaltender who was an All-American for Western Michigan.

== Career ==
Horn had a 3 successful years at ND. He was voted Top Goaltender: Bill Horn (Notre Dame)at the 1984 Air Canada Cup. He won 3 consecutive starts during the round robin play including 10 periods without surrendering a goal. Horn graduated from Athol Murray College of Notre Dame in 1985 and was recruited by Bill Wilkinson to play for Western Michigan. He became the team's starter as a freshman, taking over after the graduation of Glenn Healy, and backstopped the team to their best season in history. Horn set a program record and led the nation with 25 wins, helping WMU win 32 games that year (the only 30-win season for the program as of 2021). Horn played well during the regular season, helping the team finish in a second place tie in the CCHA, but it was in the playoffs where he became a star. While WMU had been led by their powerful offense, Horn kept his team in the semifinal against Bowling Green, winning the game in overtime. He then held top-seeded Michigan State to a single goal to claim the team's first conference championship (the Broncos would not win another for 26 years). Horn was named the Tournament MVP and led his team to their first ever NCAA Tournament appearance. While the team was swept out of the quarterfinals, Horn received a fair bit of notoriety from his performance and was drafted by the Hartford Whalers in the succeeding NHL Draft.

Western Michigan dropped back to the middle of the pack the following year but Horn played well enough to make the All-conference second team. Both he and the team saw moderate gains in his junior season but the Broncos were unable to recapture the magic of his freshman year and the team finished with a losing record in Horn's final season. The diminishing returns after the stellar freshman season left a bit of a damper on Horn's prospects, but he still was able to carve out a decent tenure as a minor league goaltender. After a year off, he made his first appearance for the Roanoke Valley Rebels in 1990 and would find himself returning to the region many times over the succeeding decade. He joined the Michigan Falcons for their inaugural season the following year and helped the team win the inaugural Colonial Hockey League regular season title. he bounced between several leagues over the next three years, never staying in one place for too long. He retired after helping the Greensboro Monarchs make an improbable run to the Riley Cup finals in 1995.

Horn won 2 Championships in Roller Hockey International in 1993 with the Anaheim Bullfrogs and 1996 with the Orlando Jackals.

Horn returned as a player two years later, playing for three teams in the area in parts of two seasons before hanging up his pads. After several years off, he appeared in two games during the 2002–03 season for the St. Pete/Winston-Salem Parrots in their only year of existence.

After his graduation from Western Michigan Horn had started coaching the goaltending position, founding Horn Goaltending, but he began to make it a full-time position at the tail end of his professional career. In 1998 he served as a player-coach for the Winston-Salem IceHawks and continues to instruct as of 2021. Horn's sons also played hockey; Brett reaching the college ranks with SUNY Potsdam and Zac last appearing for the Carolina Jr. Hurricanes of the USPHL Premier league. In 2020–21, Horn served as the goaltending coach for the Jr. Canes.

He was inducted into the Western Michigan Athletic Hall of Fame in 2019.

== Statistics ==
=== Regular season and playoffs ===
			Regular season									Playoffs
Season	Team	League	GP	W	L	T	MIN	GA	SO	GAA	SV%	GP	W	L	MIN	GA	SO	GAA	SV%
1985–86	Western Michigan	CCHA	30	25	5	0	—	—	0	—	—	—	—	—	—	—	—	—	—
1986–87	Western Michigan	CCHA	36	19	16	0	2066	136	2	3.95	.890	—	—	—	—	—	—	—	—
1987–88	Western Michigan	CCHA	33	15	13	2	—	—	1	—	—	—	—	—	—	—	—	—	—
1988–89	Western Michigan	CCHA	37	12	19	6	2181	153	1	4.21	.867	—	—	—	—	—	—	—	—
1990–91	Roanoke Valley Rebels	ECHL	51	18	21	6	2719	194	1	4.28	.900	—	—	—	—	—	—	—	—
1990–91	New Haven Nighthawks	AHL	1	1	0	0	60	5	0	5.00	.833	—	—	—	—	—	—	—	—
1991–92	Michigan Falcons	CoHL	43	20	13	3	2179	147	1	4.05	—	4	—	—	—	—	—	—	—
1992–93	Detroit Falcons	CoHL	8	5	2	1	484	34	0	4.21	.816	—	—	—	—	—	—	—	—
1992–93	Greensboro Monarchs	ECHL	27	16	9	0	1465	81	3	3.32	.899	—	—	—	—	—	—	—	—
1992–93	San Diego Gulls	IHL	2	1	1	0	120	5	0	2.50	.911	—	—	—	—	—	—	—	—
1992–93	Rochester Americans	AHL	6	3	1	1	304	22	0	4.34	.868	1	—	—	—	—	—	—	—
1993–94	Wheeling Thunderbirds	ECHL	4	2	0	0	107	5	0	2.80	.911	—	—	—	—	—	—	—	—
1993–94	Rochester Americans	AHL	25	9	9	5	1394	81	0	3.49	.873	1	—	—	—	—	—	—	—
1994–95	San Diego Gulls	IHL	8	2	1	1	288	15	0	3.12	.889	—	—	—	—	—	—	—	—
1994–95	Greensboro Monarchs	ECHL	20	13	5	1	1134	58	0	3.07	.902	13	—	—	—	—	—	—	—
1996–97	Raleigh Icecaps	ECHL	29	7	16	2	1512	101	0	4.01	.889	—	—	—	—	—	—	—	—
1996–97	Columbus Cottonmouths	CHL	3	2	1	0	158	17	0	6.43	.819	2	—	—	—	—	—	—	—
1997–98	Winston-Salem IceHawks	UHL	24	12	12	0	1358	87	1	3.84	.876	—	—	—	—	—	—	—	—
2002–03	St. Pete/Winston-Salem Parrots	ACHL	2	0	1	0	79	6	0	4.55	.813	—	—	—	—	—	—	—	—
NCAA totals			136	71	53	8	7933	542	4	4.10	.876	—	—	—	—	—	—	—	—
CoHL/UHL totals			75	37	27	4	4021	268	2	4.00	—	4	—	—	—	—	—	—	—
ECHL totals			131	56	51	9	6937	439	4	3.80	.898	13	—	—	—	—	—	—	—
IHL totals			10	3	2	1	408	20	0	2.94	.895	—	—	—	—	—	—	—	—
AHL totals			32	13	10	6	1758	108	0	3.69	.871	2	—	—	—	—	—	—	—

== Awards and honors ==
Award	Year
AHCA West Second-Team All-American	1985–86
CCHA All-Tournament Team	1986
All-CCHA Second Team	1985–86

Awards and achievements
Preceded by Norm Foster	CCHA Most Valuable Player in Tournament; 1986	Succeeded by Bobby Reynolds
