= 2016 Central Penn Capitals season =

Final season of Central Penn Capitals football

- Owner: Isaac Carn
- General manager: Milton Creary
- Head coach: Rick Marsilio (resigned on April 20, 1–3 record); Andre Coles (interim)
- Home stadium: Pennsylvania Farm Show Complex & Expo Center

Results
- Record: 4–4
- Division place: 4th
- Playoffs: Did not qualify

The 2016 Central Penn Capitals season was the fourth season for the American indoor football franchise, and their fourth in the American Indoor Football. On October 14, 2015, it was announced that the Capitals were moving to Harrisburg and renaming themselves the Central Penn Capitals.

== Schedule ==
Key: Win Tie Loss Bye

=== Exhibition ===
All start times are local to home team

Week	Day	Date	Kickoff	Opponent	Results		Location
Week	Day	Date	Kickoff	Opponent	Score	Record	Location
11	Saturday	May 7	4:00pm	Connecticut Chiefs			Pennsylvania Farm Show Complex & Expo Center

=== Regular season ===
All start times are local to home team

Week	Day	Date	Kickoff	Opponent	Results		Location
Week	Day	Date	Kickoff	Opponent	Score	Record	Location
1	BYE						
2	BYE						
3	Saturday	March 12	7:05pm	Lehigh Valley Steelhawks	L 27–44	0–1	Pennsylvania Farm Show Complex & Expo Center
4	BYE						
5	BYE						
6	Saturday	April 2	7:05pm	Philadelphia Yellow Jackets	L 36–40	0–2	Pennsylvania Farm Show Complex & Expo Center
7	Saturday	April 9	7:05pm	Triangle Torch	W 74–43	1–2	Pennsylvania Farm Show Complex & Expo Center
8	Saturday	April 16	7:05pm	at Philadelphia Yellow Jackets	L 26–79	1–3	Class of 1923 Arena
9	Sunday	April 24	7:05pm	at Triangle Torch	L 41–47	1–4	Dorton Arena
10	Saturday	April 30	7:05pm	at Lehigh Valley Steelhawks	W 65–56	2–4	PPL Center
11	BYE						
~~12~~	~~Saturday~~	~~May 14~~	~~7:05pm~~	~~Winston Wildcats~~	Cancelled		~~Pennsylvania Farm Show Complex & Expo Center~~
12	Saturday	May 14	7:05pm	Maryland Eagles	W 67–0	3–4	Pennsylvania Farm Show Complex & Expo Center
13	Saturday	May 21	7:05pm	at Lehigh Valley Steelhawks	W 37–29	4–4	PPL Center
14	BYE						

=== Standings ===
2016 AIF Northern standings
Team	W	L	PCT
y – West Michigan Ironmen	6	1	.857
x – River City Raiders	6	1	.857
x – Lehigh Valley Steelhawks	6	2	.750
Philadelphia Yellow Jackets	4	3	.571
Central Penn Capitals	4	4	.500
Chicago Blitz	3	3	.500
Triangle Torch	3	4	.429
Winston Wildcats	3	5	.375
Maryland Eagles	0	2	.000
Northern Kentucky Nightmare	0	5	.000

=== Playoffs ===
All start times are local to home team

Round	Day	Date	Kickoff	Opponent	Score	Location
~~Div. Semifinals~~	~~Saturday~~	~~June 4~~	~~7:05pm~~	~~at West Michigan Ironmen~~	Cancelled	~~L. C. Walker Arena~~

When initially announced, the Capitals were set to play the Northern Division's first-seeded West Michigan Ironmen. On May 30, the Capitals were replaced with the Southern Division's third-seeded Myrtle Beach Freedom and the Capitals were held out of the playoffs altogether.

== Roster ==
2016 Central Penn Capitals roster
Quarterbacks: -- Ray Wagner; -- Isiah Williams; Running backs: Currently vacant; Wide receivers: -- Kelvin Irving; -- Raymond Mack; -- Brian Richards	Offensive linemen: Currently vacant; Defensive linemen: -- Michael Bibbs; -- Kiem LeGrant	Linebackers: -- Kevin Cuffee; 8 Jermaine Thaxton; Defensive backs: -- Mark Grandville; -- John Kennedy II; -- Travis Proctor; -- Armar Watson; Kickers: -- Drew Newcomer	Injured reserve: currently vacant; Refused to report: -- Terrill Barnes WR (DNR); -- Bakari Brown WR (DNR); -- Jeff Joyle WR (DNR); -- Eric Liles RB (DNR); -- Collin Nelson DB (DNR); -- Jared Sampson DL (DNR); -- Quinn Way WR (DNR); Exempt list: -- Tanner Melson DL (Exempt); Rookies in italics; Roster updated May 25, 2016; 12 Active, 8 Inactive
