= 2016 Triangle Torch season =

- Owner: George Sutphen
- General manager: George Sutphen
- Head coach: Josh Resignalo
- Home stadium: Dorton Arena; 1025 Blue Ridge Road; Raleigh, NC 27607

Results
- Record: 3–4
- Division place: 7th
- Playoffs: did not qualify

The 2016 Triangle Torch season was the first season for the American indoor football franchise, and their first in American Indoor Football.

== Schedule ==
Key: Win Tie Loss Bye

=== Regular season ===
All start times are local to home team

| Week | Day | Date | Kickoff | Opponent | Results | | Location |
| Week | Day | Date | Kickoff | Opponent | Score | Record | Location |
|---|---|---|---|---|---|---|---|
| 1 | BYE | | | | | | |
| 2 | BYE | | | | | | |
| 3 | BYE | | | | | | |
| 4 | Sunday | March 20 | 4:05pm | Winston Wildcats | W 53–33 | 1–0 | Dorton Arena |
| 5 | Friday | March 25 | 7:05pm | Lehigh Valley Steelhawks | L 30-66 | 1–1 | Dorton Arena |
| 6 | BYE | | | | | | |
| 7 | Saturday | April 9 | 7:05pm | at Central Penn Capitals | L 43-74 | 1-2 | Pennsylvania Farm Show Complex & Expo Center |
| 8 | Saturday | April 16 | 7:05pm | at Winston Wildcats | W 58-12 | 2-2 | LJVM Coliseum Annex |
| 9 | Sunday | April 24 | 4:05pm | Central Penn Capitals | W 47-41 | 3-2 | Dorton Arena |
| ~~10~~ | ~~Saturday~~ | ~~April 30~~ | ~~7:05pm~~ | ~~at Philadelphia Yellow Jackets~~ | Rescheduled for May 28 | | ~~Class of 1923 Arena~~ |
| 11 | Sunday | May 8 | 4:05pm | Philadelphia Yellow Jackets | L 42-59 | 3-3 | Dorton Arena |
| 12 | Saturday | May 14 | 7:05pm | at Lehigh Valley Steelhawks | L 19-68 | 3-4 | PPL Center |
| 13 | BYE | | | | | | |
| ~~14~~ | ~~Saturday~~ | ~~May 28~~ | ~~7:05pm~~ | ~~at Philadelphia Yellow Jackets~~ | Cancelled | | ~~Class of 1923 Arena~~; ~~Pennsylvania Farm Show Complex & Expo Center~~ |

=== Standings ===
2016 AIF Northern standings
| Team | W | L | PCT |
|---|---|---|---|
| y – West Michigan Ironmen | 6 | 1 | .857 |
| x – River City Raiders | 6 | 1 | .857 |
| x – Lehigh Valley Steelhawks | 6 | 2 | .750 |
| Philadelphia Yellow Jackets | 4 | 3 | .571 |
| Central Penn Capitals | 4 | 4 | .500 |
| Chicago Blitz | 3 | 3 | .500 |
| Triangle Torch | 3 | 4 | .429 |
| Winston Wildcats | 3 | 5 | .375 |
| Maryland Eagles | 0 | 2 | .000 |
| Northern Kentucky Nightmare | 0 | 5 | .000 |

== Roster ==
2016 Triangle Torch roster
| Quarterbacks: 7 Brian Harris; 10 Garrett Sutphen; Running backs: 25 Anson Yarborough; Wide receivers: 1 Antonio Allen; 12 Gerron Bryant; -- Tony Dixon; -- Frank James; 8 Justin Kenyan; 17 Chad Walcott | Offensive linemen: 68 Ken Brown; 50 Tobias Brown; -- Anthony Harris; -- R. J. Harvin; -- Phillip Watson; 77 Jataurus White; 91 Jamaal Williams; Defensive linemen: 55 William Alderman; 75 Dontre Brown; 11 Stanley Porter | Linebackers: 56 Preston Hines; 5 Allen Lee; 9 Brandon Sutton; Defensive backs: 6 Malik Cromartie; 2 Keith Holliday; 3 Jay Jackson; 23 Dekota Marshall; 4 John Robertson; 21 Jacob Sykes; 22 Stephen Virgil; Kickers: 18 T. C. Stevens | Injured reserve: currently vacant; Exempt list: currently vacant; Practice squad: currently vacant; rookies in italics; Roster updated May 12, 2016; 30 Active, 0 Inactive; → More rosters |
