= 2016 Lehigh Valley Steelhawks season =

- Owner: Glenn W. Clark
- General manager: Michael Clark
- Head coach: Chris Thompson
- Home stadium: PPL Center; 701 Hamilton Street; Allentown, Pennsylvania, U.S.

Results
- Record: 6-2
- Division place: 3rd
- Playoffs: Won Divisional Semifinal 54-52 (Raiders); Lost Northern Championship 35-42 (Ironmen)

The 2016 Lehigh Valley Steelhawks season was the sixth season for the American indoor football franchise, and their first in the American Indoor Football (AIF).

== Schedule ==
Key: Win Tie Loss Bye

=== Preseason ===
All start times are local to home team

Week	Day	Date	Kickoff	Opponent	Results		Location
Week	Day	Date	Kickoff	Opponent	Score	Record	Location
1	Saturday	March 5	7:05pm	Philadelphia Yellow Jackets	W 41-28	1-0	PPL Center

=== Regular season ===
All start times are local to home team

Week	Day	Date	Kickoff	Opponent	Results		Location
Week	Day	Date	Kickoff	Opponent	Score	Record	Location
1	BYE						
2	BYE						
3	Saturday	March 12	7:05pm	at Central Penn Capitals	W 44-27	1-0	Pennsylvania Farm Show Complex & Expo Center
4	BYE						
5	Friday	March 25	7:05pm	at Triangle Torch	W 66-30	2-0	Dorton Arena
6	Saturday	April 2	7:05pm	at Winston Wildcats	W 43-18	3-0	LJVM Coliseum Annex
7	Friday	April 8	7:30pm	Winston Wildcats	W 72-8	4-0	PPL Center
8	BYE						
9	Saturday	April 23	7:05pm	Philadelphia Yellow Jackets	W 52-33	5-0	PPL Center
10	Saturday	April 30	7:05pm	Central Penn Capitals	L 56-65	5-1	PPL Center
11	BYE						
12	Saturday	May 14	7:05pm	Triangle Torch	W 68-19	6-1	PPL Center
13	Saturday	May 21	7:05pm	Central Penn Capitals	L 29-37	6-2	PPL Center
14	BYE						

=== Standings ===
2016 AIF Northern standings
Team	W	L	PCT
y – West Michigan Ironmen	6	1	.857
x – River City Raiders	6	1	.857
x – Lehigh Valley Steelhawks	6	2	.750
Philadelphia Yellow Jackets	4	3	.571
Central Penn Capitals	4	4	.500
Chicago Blitz	3	3	.500
Triangle Torch	3	4	.429
Winston Wildcats	3	5	.375
Maryland Eagles	0	2	.000
Northern Kentucky Nightmare	0	5	.000

=== Playoffs ===
All start times are local to home team

Round	Day	Date	Kickoff	Opponent	Score	Location
Div. Semifinals	Monday	June 6	7:00pm	at River City Raiders	W 54-52	Family Arena
Div. Championship	Saturday	June 11	8:00pm	at West Michigan Ironmen	L 35-42	L. C. Walker Arena

== Roster ==
2016 Lehigh Valley Steelhawks roster
Quarterbacks: 11 Jake Jablonski; 8 Warren Smith; Running backs: -- Evan Rodriguez; Wide receivers: -- Gregory Edwards; 81 Warren Oliver Jr.; 4 Darius Prince; 1 Brandon Rendord; 7 Jerrell Young; -- Jeremy Hartman WR	Offensive linemen: 54 John Alvarez; 58 Andrew Edouard; 72 Lloyd Morrison; 77 David Osei; Defensive linemen: 97 Tahir Basil; 22 Gerard Bryant; 92 Larry Ford; 12 Dante Holmes; 6 Amara Kamara; 99 Shawn Lockett; 68 Justin Waltzer	Linebackers: 5 Carl Fleming; -- Joe Koonce; Defensive backs: 22 Gerard Bryant; -- Orlando Fisher; 24 E. J. Frain; 5 Jerome Junior; 33 Lenroy Naismith; 2 James Pitts; 21 Ken Walton; 3 John Williams; Kickers: 10 Spencer Hotaling	Injured reserve: Current vacant; Exempt list: -- Chris Alvarez DL (Exempt); -- Alim Koroma DL (Exempt); -- Joe Powell DB (Exempt); Suspension: -- Jackson Dallas OL (Susp.); rookies in italics Roster updated May 31, 2016; 30 Active, 5 Inactive → More rosters
