= Harding Mazzotti Arena =

Arena in Glens Falls, New York

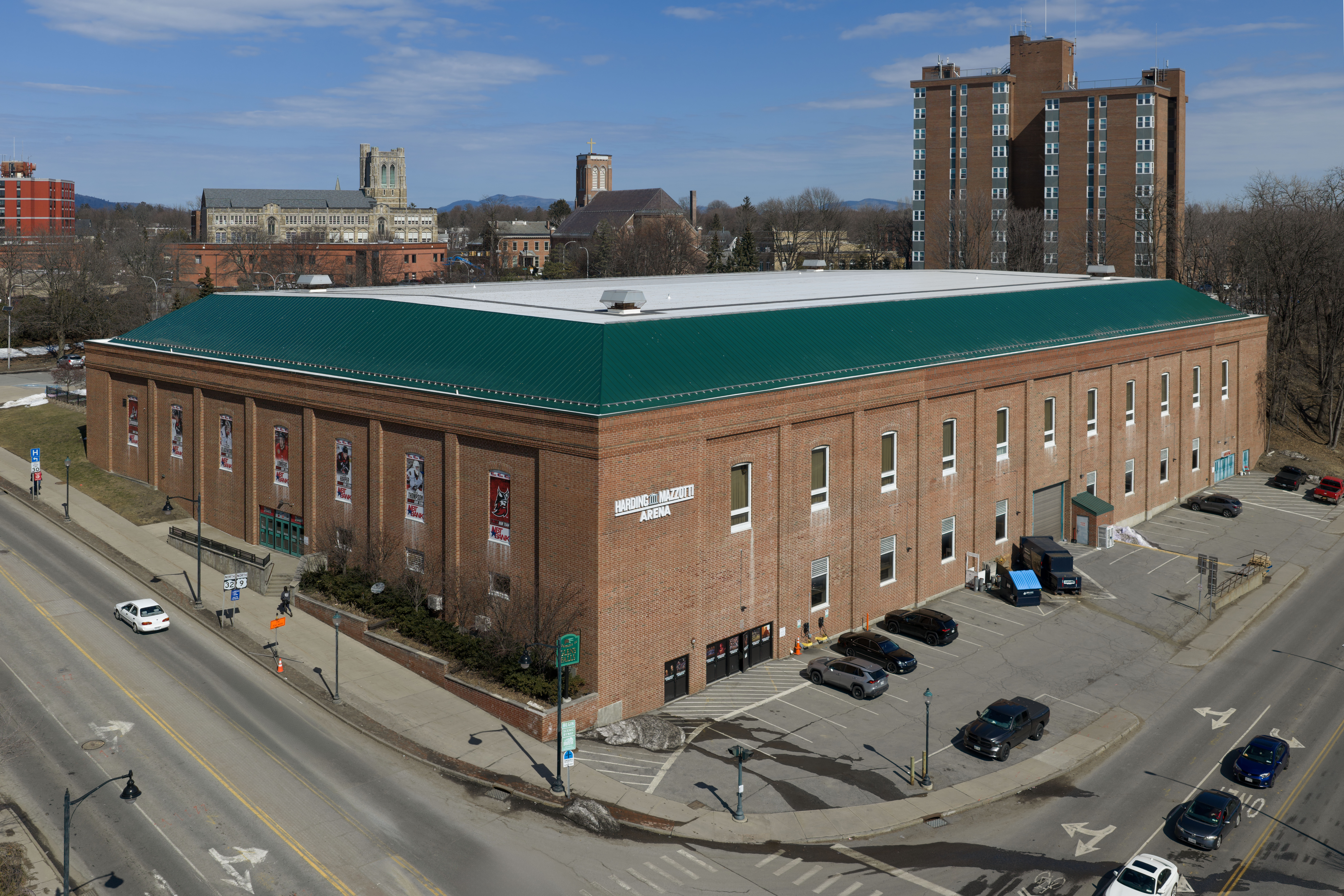

- Location within New York State Location within the United States
- Former names: Glens Falls Civic Center (1979–2017); Cool Insuring Arena (2017–2025)
- Location: 1 Civic Center Plaza; Glens Falls, NY 12801
- Coordinates: 43.308169°N 73.641782°W
- Owner: City of Glens Falls
- Operator: Adirondack Civic Center Coalition
- Capacity: 4,794 permanent seats plus capacity for 1,000 seated or standing on floor and 1,000 along promenade for standing room only
- Surface: Multi-surface

Construction
- Groundbreaking: August 15, 1977
- Opened: May 18, 1979
- Cost: $3 million ($13.3 million in 2025 dollars)
- Architect: Crandell Associates
- General contractor: Lino Associates

Tenants
- Adirondack Thunder (ECHL) (2015–present); Adirondack Flames (AHL) (2014–2015); Adirondack Phantoms (AHL) (2009–2014); Adirondack Icehawks/Frostbite (UHL) (1999–2006); Adirondack Red Wings (AHL) (1979–1999); Adirondack Wildcats (USBL) (2002–2004); Empire State Cobras (RHI) (1996); Adirondack Jr. Thunder (EHLP) (2022–2025)

The Harding Mazzotti Arena (formerly called the Glens Falls Civic Center and Cool Insuring Arena) is a 4,794-seat multi-purpose arena located in downtown Glens Falls, New York, that is the home of the Adirondack Thunder of the ECHL. Built in 1979, it was originally the home of the Adirondack Red Wings, AHL affiliate of the Detroit Red Wings.

== History ==
=== Hockey in Glens Falls ===
In preparation for the incoming Adirondack Red Wings, the Glens Falls Civic Center was completed in 1979. The building was constructed on a vacant lot just south of the city's center as part of the city's "Urban Renewal Era".

The Red Wings played in the Civic Center for 20 seasons in the AHL. During their time, they won 4 Calder Cup championships, and saw dozens of players move up to the NHL. In 1999, the parent club in Detroit pulled the team out of the arena, citing declining attendance as the reason for the sudden departure.

The Adirondack IceHawks were the next tenants of the building, after moving operations from Winston-Salem to Glens Falls. In 2004, the team was bought by ESPN's Steve Levy and Barry Melrose and rebranded as the Frostbite, who played through the 2005–06 season. The arena then sat without a hockey team for nearly 3 years.

For the 2007–08 AHL season and 2008–09 AHL season, the nearby Albany River Rats played four home games in Glens Falls in order to gauge the community's interest in whether an American Hockey League franchise could relocate to Glens Falls. City government officials and arena management were looking into the possibility of acquiring a franchise to play in the Civic Center.

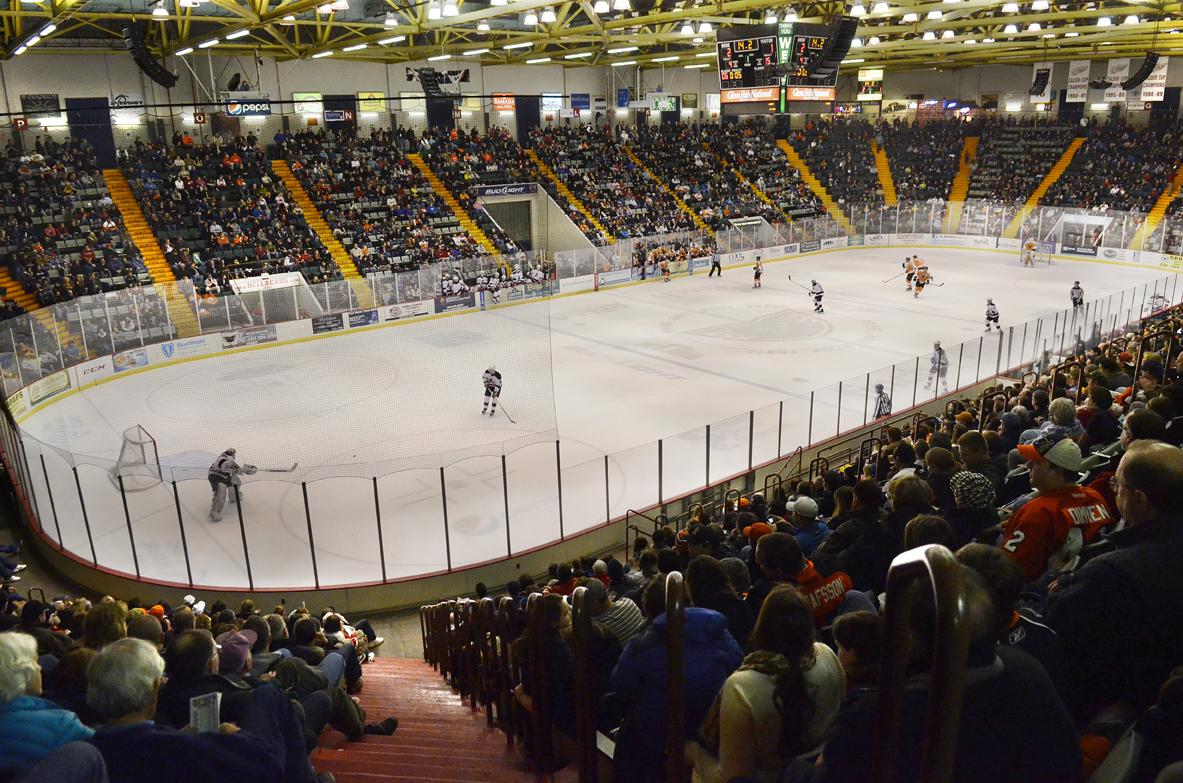
Adirondack Phantoms game in 2013

On February 12, 2009, the Civic Center was announced to be a potential temporary home to the Philadelphia Phantoms AHL team, who would leave Philadelphia following the 2009 season due to the demolition of the Wachovia Spectrum. That team, the Adirondack Phantoms, would play for five seasons at the Civic Center before moving to the PPL Center in 2014, becoming the Lehigh Valley Phantoms. However, AHL hockey stayed in Glens Falls for at least the 2014–15 season, as the former Abbotsford Heat announced they would be moving to the area, adopting the new Adirondack Flames moniker.

However, the Flames' first season would also be their last in Glens Falls, as the team moved to Stockton, California after the 2014–15 season to become the Stockton Heat. Glens Falls would not be without pro hockey, however, as the ECHL's Stockton Thunder moved to Glens Falls for the 2015–16 season to become the Adirondack Thunder.

On January 21, 2022, the Eastern Hockey League (2013–) announced the Adirondack Jr. Thunder will play their inaugural season in the Eastern Hockey League Premier, the organization's development league. They announced their home games would be played at Cool Insuring Arena, and Adirondack Red Wings all-time points and games-played leader Glenn Merkosky will be the team's first head coach.

=== Other notable events ===
The Grateful Dead played the first concert at the Glens Falls Civic Center on August 31, 1979. The Dead played there a further three times - every year until 1982.

On June 21, 1989, The Who kicked off their 25th Anniversary Tour at the Civic Center. It was the first time in seven years they were on tour. It also marked their first performance without drummer Kenney Jones, who replaced Keith Moon in 1979; he was replaced by Simon Phillips for that tour.

Iron Maiden played here for the first time in 1982.

19-year-old Mike Tyson defeated James Tillis, for his 20th straight professional career win, at the Civic Center on May 5, 1986. Tyson won via unanimous decision in the 10-round fight. Two months later, on July 26, 1986, Tyson fought and defeated Marvis Frazier in 30 seconds via KO for his 25th straight win in his professional career.

On October 31, 1994, it became the site of the first of ten "Halloween costumes" by jam band Phish. That evening, in the middle of a three set concert, Phish performed The Beatles' White Album in its entirety. The show was recorded and later released as a live album, entitled Live Phish Volume 13. Phish returned to the Civic Center on October 23, 2013, playing "Back in the USSR" and "While My Guitar Gently Weeps" from the White Album.

The Glens Falls Civic Center has been the host of the New York State Public High School Athletic Association Basketball Championships through 2014. The Federation tournament was previously held at the Glens Falls Civic Center up until 2011, when it was moved to the Times Union Center in Albany, New York. The Federation tournament has now returned to Glens Falls, but the NYSPHSAA tournament has moved to Binghamton.

Another notable event at the Civic Center came on December 8, 2010, when it hosted a basketball game between BYU and Vermont billed as the "Hometown Classic". The game served as a homecoming for BYU star Jimmer Fredette, who had led Glens Falls High School to the New York state Class A championship game, held at this facility, in 2007. A beyond-capacity crowd of 6,300, which also included former BYU great and current Boston Celtics general manager Danny Ainge, saw Fredette's Cougars win 86–58.

=== Ownership and management ===
On April 14, 2008, the building became one of the management properties of Global Spectrum for the city of Glens Falls, New York.

A public auction of the Glens Falls Civic Center had been scheduled for August 18, 2014; however, no bidders showed to make an offer. A local coalition continues to attempt to raise money to purchase the arena. The yearly operating losses near $1 million (US), and the city-owned arena does not currently have enough council votes in Warren County, New York to impose a 1% tax increase to subsidize the arena.

The Adirondack Civic Center Coalition placed one of two bids in a private auction on September 12, 2014. On October 21, 2014, the Glens Falls Common Council voted unanimously to sell the arena to the then-named "Coalition to Save Our Civic Center". Jack Walter, a local design and planning consultant, was named building manager on March 20, 2015. Walter would lead a new management team to replace Global Spectrum. That summer, Jeff Mead was announced as Walter's replacement on July 20, 2015.

On July 11, 2017, the Cool Insuring Agency purchased the naming rights to the arena on a five-year deal. On March 19, 2019, it was announced that the Cool Insuring Agency extended their contract, keeping the building's naming rights through 2024.

On July 28, 2025, area Law firm Harding Mazzotti LLP acquired the naming rights of the venue through 2030.

Events and tenants
| Preceded by Hampton Coliseum (as the Virginia Wings) | Home of the Adirondack Red Wings; 1979–1999 | Succeeded by AT&T Center (as the San Antonio Rampage |
| Preceded by Lawrence Joel Veterans Memorial Coliseum (as the Winston-Salem IceHawks) | Home of the Adirondack IceHawks; 1999–2004 | Succeeded by Glens Falls Civic Center (as the Adirondack Frostbite) |
| Preceded by Glens Falls Civic Center (as the Adirondack IceHawks) | Home of the Adirondack Frostbite; 2004–2006 | Succeeded by Folded |
| Preceded by Wachovia Spectrum (as the Philadelphia Phantoms) | Home of the Adirondack Phantoms; 2009–2014 | Succeeded by PPL Center (as the Lehigh Valley Phantoms) |
| Preceded by Abbotsford Entertainment & Sports Centre (as the Abbotsford Heat) | Home of the Adirondack Flames; 2014–2015 | Succeeded by Stockton Arena (as the Stockton Heat) |
| Preceded by Stockton Arena (as the Stockton Thunder) | Home of the Adirondack Thunder; 2015–present | Succeeded by Current |
| Preceded by Created | Home of the Adirondack Jr Thunder; 2022–present | Succeeded by Current |
