= Winston Wildcats =

Logo

General information
- Founded: 2015
- Headquartered: the Piedmont Triad, North Carolina
- Colors: Purple, black, gray, white
- Mascot: Wildcat
- HighPointWildcats.com

Team history
- Winston Wildcats (2016–2018); High Point Wildcats (2019); Carolina Wildcats (2019)

Home fields
- Winston-Salem Fairgrounds Annex (2016)

League / conference affiliations
- American Indoor Football (2016); Northern Division (2016); Independent (2017–2018); Elite Indoor Football (2019)

The Winston Wildcats were an indoor football team based in Piedmont Triad region of North Carolina. The Wildcats joined the professional American Indoor Football (AIF) as an expansion team in 2015. Following the 2016 season, the AIF ceased operations, leaving the Wildcats without a league. The Wildcats have periodically played as an independent against various teams in the local market. When they were in the AIF, their home games were at the LJVM Coliseum Annex in Winston-Salem, North Carolina. Since the 2019 season, they are based out of High Point, North Carolina, operating as a travel team called the High Point Wildcats in the Southern Steam's Elite Indoor Football, a league composed of a variety of professional to semi-professional indoor football teams. During the 2019 season, the team announced that coaches Malachi King, Dale Glossenger, and John Burns had purchased the team from Roderick Hinton and rebranded as the Carolina Wildcats.

The Wildcats were the first indoor football team to call Winston-Salem home since the Winston-Salem Energy, which played in the National Indoor Football League for the 2002 season before folding.

== Statistics and records ==
=== Season-by-season results ===
League champions	Division champions	Playoff berth	League leader

Season	League	Division	Regular season				Postseason
Season	League	Division	Finish	Wins	Losses	Ties	Postseason
2016	AIF	Northern	8th	3	5	0	Did not qualify

=== Head coaches' record ===
Name	Term	Regular season				Playoffs		Awards
Name	Term	W	L	T	Win%	W	L	Awards
Barry Marrow	2016	3	5	0	.375	—	—	

== 2016 season ==
2016 Winston Wildcats season
- Owner: Sports Xtras
- Head coach: Barry Marrow
- Home stadium: LJVM Coliseum Annex; 2825 University Parkway; Winston-Salem, NC 27105

Results
- Record: 3–5
- Division place: 8th
- Playoffs: Did not qualify

=== Schedule ===
Key: Win Tie Loss Bye

==== Regular season ====
All start times were local to home team

Week	Day	Date	Kickoff	Opponent	Results		Location
Week	Day	Date	Kickoff	Opponent	Score	Record	Location
1	BYE						
2	BYE						
3	BYE						
4	Sunday	March 20	4:05pm	at Triangle Torch	L 33–53	0–1	Dorton Arena
5	Saturday	March 26	7:05pm	Philadelphia Yellow Jackets	L 9–55	0–2	LJVM Coliseum Annex
6	Saturday	April 2	7:05pm	Lehigh Valley Steelhawks	L 18–43	0–3	LJVM Coliseum Annex
7	Friday	April 8	7:05pm	at Lehigh Valley Steelhawks	L 8–72	0–4	PPL Center
8	Saturday	April 16	7:05pm	Triangle Torch	L 12–58	0–5	LJVM Coliseum Annex
9	BYE						
10	Saturday	April 30	7:05pm	Maryland Eagles	W 49–19	1–5	LJVM Coliseum Annex
11	BYE						
~~12~~	~~Saturday~~	~~May 14~~	~~7:05pm~~	~~at Central Penn Capitals~~	Cancelled		~~Pennsylvania Farm Show Complex & Expo Center~~
12	Saturday	May 14	7:05pm	Philadelphia Yellow Jackets	W 2–0*	2–5	
13	Saturday	May 21	7:05pm	at Philadelphia Yellow Jackets	W 2–0 (forfeit)	3–5	Class of 1923 Arena
14	BYE						

* — Game was never scheduled to be played but was credited as forfeit win to the Wildcats one week after the non-played game with no explanation given by the AIF. (The Yellow Jackets were scheduled against the Maryland Eagles that week but had to forfeit due to the loss of their arena lease.)

=== Standings ===
2016 AIF Northern standings
Team	W	L	PCT
y – West Michigan Ironmen	6	1	.857
x – River City Raiders	6	1	.857
x – Lehigh Valley Steelhawks	6	2	.750
Philadelphia Yellow Jackets	4	3	.571
Central Penn Capitals	4	4	.500
Chicago Blitz	3	3	.500
Triangle Torch	3	4	.429
Winston Wildcats	3	5	.375
Maryland Eagles	0	2	.000
Northern Kentucky Nightmare	0	5	.000

=== 2016 roster ===
2016 Winston Wildcats roster
Quarterbacks: 1 Darius Coleman; 11 Torrie Walker; Running backs: Currently vacant; Wide receivers: 15 Anthony Boggans; 3 Jay Smith; 28 C. J. Tarver; 12 Antwan Thorpe	Offensive linemen: 56 LaVance Ginyard; 52 Harvey Oliver; 90 John Uqdan; Defensive linemen: 99 Chase Blackburn; 9 Maurice Gibbs; 54 Kevin Jones; 57 C. J. Montgomery	Linebackers: 44 Raphael King; 33 Aaron Massey; 2 Ricky Taylor; Defensive backs: 25 Lamarcus Bond; 36 Donnie Bryant; 36 Lawyer Montgomery; 21 Terrance Moore; Kickers: 18 Sonny Powell	Injured reserve: Currently vacant; Exempt list: Currently vacant; Rookies in italics; Roster updated April 5, 2016; 21 Active, 0 Inactive
