= Philadelphia Yellow Jackets =

Defunct indoor football team in Pennsylvania

Logo

General information
- Founded: 2015
- Folded: 2016
- Headquartered: Philadelphia, Pennsylvania
- Colors: Sky blue, gold, white
- philadelphiayellowjackets.com

Personnel
- Owner: Joe Krause
- Head coach: Mike Brown

Team history
- Philadelphia Yellow Jackets (2016)

Home fields
- Class of 1923 Arena (2016)

League / conference affiliations
- American Indoor Football (2016): Northern (2016)

The Philadelphia Yellow Jackets were a professional indoor football team and a member of the American Indoor Football league that played half a season in 2016 before folding due to financial issues.

In addition to being Philadelphia's second arena/indoor team (after the Philadelphia Soul, who played in the Arena Football League), the Yellow Jackets were named in honor of (and their visual identity is designed after) Philadelphia's first National Football League team, the Frankford Yellow Jackets. The original Yellow Jackets played in the NFL from 1924 until 1931 (and notably won the 1926 NFL championship).

== History ==
On June 11, 2015, the AIF announced the Yellow Jackets would be joining for the 2016 season. The "P-Y-J" are owned by Joe Krause, owner of the Indoor Gridiron League. The Yellow Jackets played their home games at the Class of 1923 Arena on the campus of the University of Pennsylvania the majority of their first season until May 11, 2016, when the university voided their contract for lack of payment leading to cancelling their last three games. Owner Joe Krause released a statement on the team's Facebook account accusing the university of breach of contract while he was dealing with his wife's recovery from a stroke.

They did reschedule their last "home" game to be at the Pennsylvania Farm Show Complex & Expo Center in Harrisburg, Pennsylvania, however, this game was also never played. The team was removed from the AIF after the 2016 season.

== 2016 season ==
=== Season record ===
Season	League	Division	Regular season				Postseason results
Season	League	Division	Finish	Wins	Losses	Ties	Postseason results
2016	AIF	Northern	folded	4	1	0	

Key: Win Tie Loss Bye

=== Preseason ===
All start times were local to home team

Week	Day	Date	Kickoff	Opponent	Results		Location
Week	Day	Date	Kickoff	Opponent	Score	Record	Location
1	Saturday	March 5	7:05pm	at Lehigh Valley Steelhawks	L 28-41	0-1	PPL Center

=== Regular season ===
All start times were local to home team

Week	Day	Date	Kickoff	Opponent	Results		Location
Week	Day	Date	Kickoff	Opponent	Score	Record	Location
1	BYE						
2	BYE						
3	BYE						
4	BYE						
5	Saturday	March 26	7:05pm	at Winston Wildcats	W 55–9	1–0	LJVM Coliseum Annex
6	Saturday	April 2	7:05pm	at Central Penn Capitals	W 40–36	2–0	Pennsylvania Farm Show Complex & Expo Center
7	BYE						
8	Saturday	April 16	7:05pm	Central Penn Capitals	W 79–26	3–0	Class of 1923 Arena
9	Saturday	April 23	7:05pm	at Lehigh Valley Steelhawks	L 33–52	3–1	PPL Center
~~10~~	~~Saturday~~	~~April 30~~	~~7:05pm~~	~~Triangle Torch~~	Rescheduled for May 28		~~Class of 1923 Arena~~
11	Saturday	May 8	4:05pm	at Triangle Torch	W 59–42	4–1	Dorton Arena
12	Saturday	May 14	7:05pm	Maryland Eagles	Cancelled (Note: Game canceled or forfeited due to the Yellow Jackets loss of a home arena.)		~~Class of 1923 Arena~~
12	Saturday	May 14	7:05pm	at Winston Wildcats	L 0–2 (Note: Game was never scheduled to be played but was credited as forfeit loss to the Wildcats one week after the non-played game with the Eagles with no explanation given by the AIF.)	4–2	
13	Saturday	May 21	7:05pm	Winston Wildcats	L 0–2	4–3	~~Class of 1923 Arena~~
~~14~~	~~Saturday~~	~~May 28~~	~~7:05pm~~	~~Triangle Torch~~	Cancelled		~~Class of 1923 Arena~~; ~~Pennsylvania Farm Show Complex & Expo Center~~

=== Standings ===
2016 AIF Northern standings
Team	W	L	PCT
y – West Michigan Ironmen	6	1	.857
x – River City Raiders	6	1	.857
x – Lehigh Valley Steelhawks	6	2	.750
Philadelphia Yellow Jackets	4	3	.571
Central Penn Capitals	4	4	.500
Chicago Blitz	3	3	.500
Triangle Torch	3	4	.429
Winston Wildcats	3	5	.375
Maryland Eagles	0	2	.000
Northern Kentucky Nightmare	0	5	.000
