= 2016 West Michigan Ironmen season =

- Owner: Terrence Williams
- Head coach: Tyrese Lynk
- Home stadium: L. C. Walker Arena

Results
- Record: 6–1
- Division place: 1st
- Playoffs: Won Northern Semifinals (Freedom) 78–37; Won Northern Championship (Steelhawks) 42–35; Lost AIF Championship (Lions) 32–74

The 2016 West Michigan Ironmen season was the franchise's inaugural season and the city of Muskegon's first indoor football season since the West Michigan ThunderHawks folded following the 2009 season.

The Ironmen won their first-ever season game against the Northern Kentucky 65–27 on March 20. Head coach Tyrese Lynk led the Ironmen to a 6–1 record and birth in the 2016 AIF Championship Game where they lost 32–74 to the Columbus Lions.

== Coaching staff ==
2016 West Michigan Ironmen staff
Front office: Owner – Terrence "TJ" Williams; Owner – Heith Seewald; General manager – currently vacant; Director of Football Operations - currently vacant	Head coach: Head Coach - Tyrese Lynk; Assistant coaches currently vacant

== Schedule ==
Key: Win Tie Loss Bye

=== Preseason ===
All start times are local to home team

Week	Day	Date	Kickoff	Opponent	Results		Location
Week	Day	Date	Kickoff	Opponent	Score	Record	Location
1	Sunday	March 6	3:05pm	Atlanta Vultures	W 63–29	1–0	L. C. Walker Arena

=== Regular season ===
All start times are local to home team

Week	Day	Date	Kickoff	Opponent	Results		Location
Week	Day	Date	Kickoff	Opponent	Score	Record	Location
1	BYE						
2	BYE						
3	Sunday	March 13	3:05pm	at River City Raiders	L 68–75	0–1	Family Arena
4	Sunday	March 20	7:05pm	Northern Kentucky Nightmare	W 65–37	1–1	L. C. Walker Arena
5	BYE						
6	Saturday	April 2	7:00pm	Chicago Blitz	W 34–30	2–1	L. C. Walker Arena
7	Saturday	April 9	7:05pm	River City Raiders	W 69–49	3–1	L. C. Walker Arena
8	BYE						
9	Saturday	April 23	7:05pm	Cincinnati Bulldogs	W 73–6	4–1	L. C. Walker Arena
10	Saturday	April 30	7:00pm	Northern Kentucky Nightmare	W 55–27	5–1	L. C. Walker Arena
11	Saturday	May 7	7:05pm	Cincinnati Bulldogs	W 107–0	6–1	L. C. Walker Arena
12	BYE						
13	BYE						
~~14~~	~~Saturday~~	~~May 28~~	~~7:00pm~~	~~at Chicago Blitz~~	Cancelled		~~Odeum Expo Center~~

=== Standings ===
2016 AIF Northern standings
Team	W	L	PCT
y – West Michigan Ironmen	6	1	.857
x – River City Raiders	6	1	.857
x – Lehigh Valley Steelhawks	6	2	.750
Philadelphia Yellow Jackets	4	3	.571
Central Penn Capitals	4	4	.500
Chicago Blitz	3	3	.500
Triangle Torch	3	4	.429
Winston Wildcats	3	5	.375
Maryland Eagles	0	2	.000
Northern Kentucky Nightmare	0	5	.000

=== Playoffs ===
All start times are local to home team

Round	Day	Date	Kickoff	Opponent	Score	Location
Div. Semifinals	Saturday	June 4	7:05pm	Myrtle Beach Freedom*	W 78–37	L. C. Walker Arena
Div. Championship	Saturday	June 11	8:00pm	Lehigh Valley Steelhawks	W 42–35	L. C. Walker Arena
AIF Championship Game	Saturday	June 18	7:00pm	at Columbus Lions	L 32–74	Columbus Civic Center

* — When initially announced, the Ironmen were set to play the Northern Division's fourth-seeded Central Penn Capitals. On May 30, the Capitals were replaced with the Southern Division's third-seeded Myrtle Beach Freedom.

== Roster ==
2016 West Michigan Ironmen roster
Quarterbacks: 14 Alex Carder; 2 Stephen Kulikowski; Running backs: 44 Korey Ringer; 33 Dakota Smith; Wide receivers: 9 Donovan Campbell; 1 Cornelius Johnson; 8 Ronald Johnson; 20 Terry Mitchell; 4 Justin Mott; 6 Jamie Potts	Offensive linemen: 99 Amilio Flores; 85 Garrett Hoskins; 59 Mario Rodriguez; Defensive linemen: 91 Ryan Armstrong; 63 Deonte' Cruse; 67 Desmond Kenner; 5 Rony Nelson; 52 Luther Robinson Jr.	Linebackers: 51 Stan Knappen; 55 Korey Morrow; 7 Derek VandenBosch; Defensive backs: 11 Jamal Abbey; 21 Corey Edwards; 24 Deonte' Hurst; 22 Erik Thompson; -- Justin Williams; Kickers: currently vacant	Injured reserve: currently vacant; Transfer list: -- Ben Hutchins RB (Exempt); Refuse to report: currently vacant; rookies in italics Roster updated May 4, 2016; 26 Active, 1 Inactive
