= 2002–03 Knoxville Ice Bears season =

2002–03 Knoxville Ice Bears
- 2002–03 record: 36-21-2
- Home record: 20-8-2
- Road record: 16-13-0
- Goals for: 217
- Goals against: 204

Team information
- General manager: Tommy Benizio
- Coach: Tony Martino
- Assistant coach: Preston Dixon
- Captain: Steve Zyork
- Arena: Knoxville Civic Coliseum
- Average attendance: 3,643

Team leaders
- Goals: Kevin Swider (40)
- Assists: Jim Bermingham (43)
- Points: Kevin Swider (80)
- Penalty minutes: Alex Alepin (292)
- Plus/minus: Kevin Swider; Jim Bermingham (+20)
- Wins: Frederick Beaubien (26)
- Goals against average: Frederick Beaubien (2.76)

The 2002–03 Knoxville Ice Bears season was the franchise's first season in existence. The team was formed when the Knoxville Speed folded after the 2001–02 United Hockey League season.

The Ice Bears played their inaugural season in the Atlantic Coast Hockey League. They finished with a 36–21–2 record, good for 2nd in the ACHL standings, behind the Orlando Seals. In the playoffs, the Ice Bears swept the St. Pete/Winston-Salem Parrots 3 Games to 0, but were swept by Orlando in the ACHL Finals.

After the season, head coach Tony Martino left to coach HC Varese and Tommy Benizio was not retained as general manager. In addition, the ACHL folded, and the Ice Bears moved to the newly formed South East Hockey League, along with the Fayetteville FireAntz. The Ice Bears averaged 3,643 fans a game in their inaugural season, which was first in the ACHL.
