= Brad Jones (ice hockey) =

American ice hockey player (born 1965)

- Born: June 26, 1965 (age 59); Sterling Heights, Michigan, U.S.
- Height: 6 ft 1 in (185 cm)
- Weight: 195 lb (88 kg; 13 st 13 lb)
- Position: Left wing
- Shot: Left
- Played for: Winnipeg Jets; Los Angeles Kings; Philadelphia Flyers
- National team: United States
- NHL draft: 156th overall, 1984; Winnipeg Jets
- Playing career: 1987–1998

Bradley Scott Jones (born June 26, 1965) is an American former professional ice hockey left winger who played six seasons in the National Hockey League (NHL) between 1987 and 1992 with the Winnipeg Jets, Los Angeles Kings, and Philadelphia Flyers.

== Career ==
Jones was drafted 156th overall in 1984 by the Winnipeg Jets. As well as Winnipeg, he played for the Los Angeles Kings and the Philadelphia Flyers. He played a total of 148 regular-season games, scoring 25 goals and 56 points.

== Career statistics ==
=== Regular season and playoffs ===
			Regular season					Playoffs
Season	Team	League	GP	G	A	Pts	PIM	GP	G	A	Pts	PIM
1980–81	Henry Ford II High School	HS-MI	—	—	—	—	—	—	—	—	—	—
1981–82	Henry Ford II High School	HS-MI	—	—	—	—	—	—	—	—	—	—
1982–83	Markham Waxers	OJAHL	46	20	36	56	75	—	—	—	—	—
1983–84	University of Michigan	CCHA	37	8	26	34	32	—	—	—	—	—
1984–85	University of Michigan	CCHA	34	21	27	48	66	—	—	—	—	—
1985–86	University of Michigan	CCHA	36	28	39	67	40	—	—	—	—	—
1986–87	University of Michigan	CCHA	40	32	46	78	64	—	—	—	—	—
1986–87	Winnipeg Jets	NHL	4	1	0	1	0	—	—	—	—	—
1987–88	Winnipeg Jets	NHL	19	2	5	7	15	1	0	0	0	0
1987–88	United States National Team	Intl	50	27	23	50	59	—	—	—	—	—
1988–89	Winnipeg Jets	NHL	22	6	5	11	6	—	—	—	—	—
1988–89	Moncton Hawks	AHL	44	20	19	39	62	7	1	0	1	22
1989–90	Winnipeg Jets	NHL	2	0	0	0	0	—	—	—	—	—
1989–90	Moncton Hawks	AHL	15	5	6	11	47	—	—	—	—	—
1989–90	New Haven Nighthawks	AHL	36	8	11	19	71	—	—	—	—	—
1990–91	Los Angeles Kings	NHL	53	9	11	20	57	8	1	1	2	2
1991–92	Philadelphia Flyers	NHL	48	7	10	17	44	—	—	—	—	—
1992–93	Ilves	FIN	26	10	7	17	62	4	0	1	1	4
1992–93	New Haven Senators	AHL	4	2	1	3	6	—	—	—	—	—
1993–94	HC Ajoie	NLB	19	9	12	21	22	—	—	—	—	—
1994–95	Springfield Falcons	AHL	61	23	22	45	47	—	—	—	—	—
1994–95	Fort Wayne Komets	IHL	4	1	1	2	6	—	—	—	—	—
1995–96	Binghamton Rangers	AHL	62	25	27	52	36	4	1	1	2	0
1996–97	Frankfurt Lions	DEL	37	14	11	25	89	9	5	3	8	18
1997–98	B.C. Icemen	UHL	55	37	28	65	58	5	2	3	5	6
NHL totals			148	25	31	56	122	9	1	1	2	2

=== International ===
Year	Team	Event	GP	G	A	Pts	PIM
1995	United States	WC	5	0	2	2	2
Senior totals			5	0	2	2	2

== Awards and honors ==
Award	Year
All-CCHA Second team	1985–86
All-CCHA First Team	1986–87
AHCA West Second-Team All-American	1986–87
