= Dieter Kochan =

Canadian-born American ice hockey player

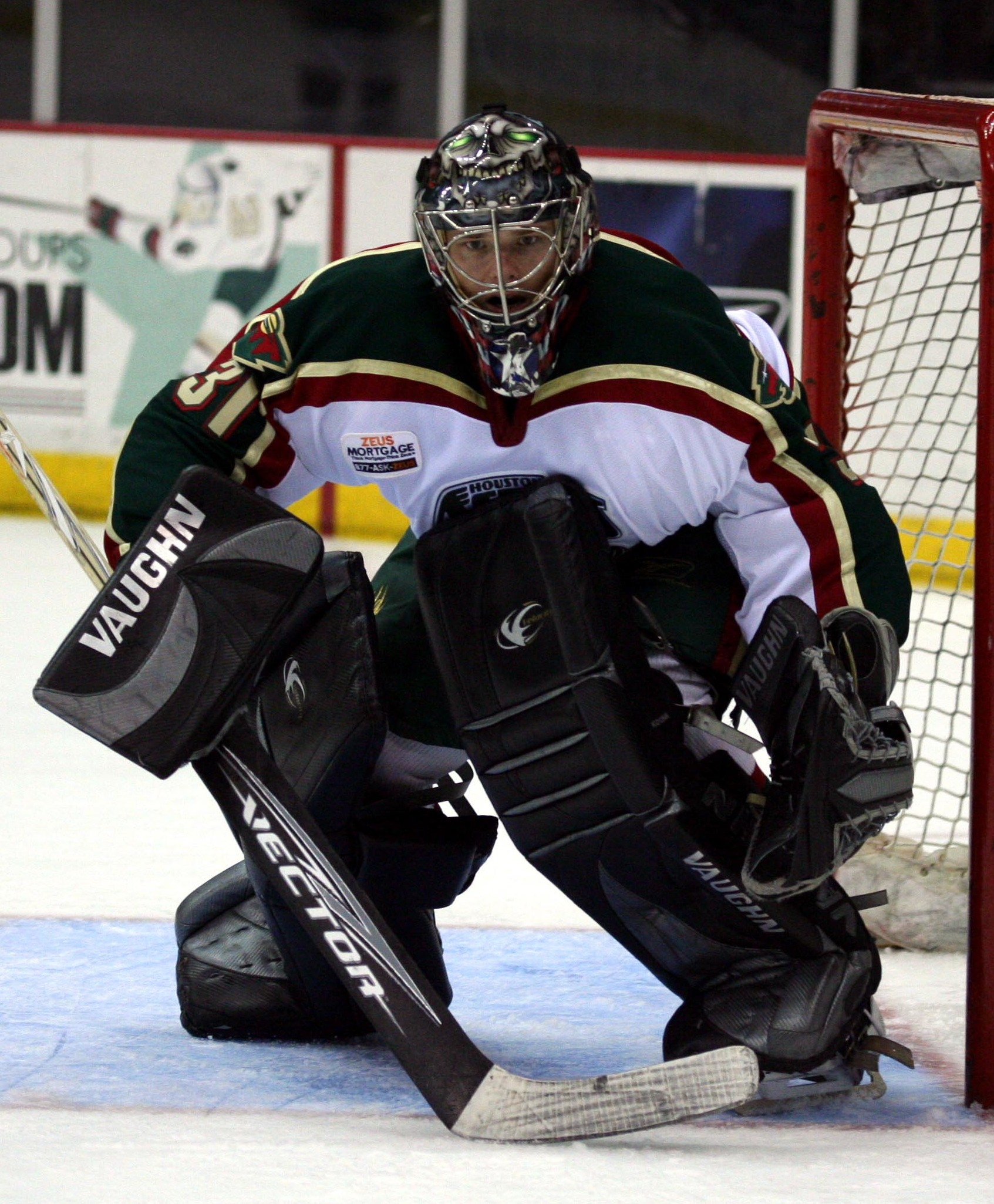
- Kochan with the Houston Aeros in 2007
- Born: May 11, 1974 (age 51); Saskatoon, Saskatchewan, Canada
- Height: 6 ft 1 in (185 cm)
- Weight: 185 lb (84 kg; 13 st 3 lb)
- Position: Goaltender
- Caught: Left
- Played for: Tampa Bay Lightning; Minnesota Wild
- National team: United States
- NHL draft: 98th overall, 1993; Vancouver Canucks
- Playing career: 1997–2007

Dieter Kochan (born May 11, 1974), is a Canadian-born American former professional ice hockey goaltender who played for the United States men's national ice hockey team at the 2002 IIHF World Championship as well as 21 games for the NHL Tampa Bay Lightning and Minnesota Wild between 2000 and 2003. He was the first player to be called up directly from the UHL to the NHL. He notably scored a goal for the B.C. Icemen, on January 5, 1999. He was a member of the Calder Cup champion Houston Aeros in 2002–03. Internationally Kochan played for the American national team at the 2002 World Championship.

Kochan was born in Saskatoon, Saskatchewan and raised in Madison, Wisconsin.

== Roller Hockey ==
Kochan grew up in Wisconsin where he also played roller hockey. He was the principal goaltender of the gold medal U.S. roller hockey teams at the 1996, 1997 and 1998 World Championships. He was also goalie of the gold medal team at the 1999 Pan American Games.

== Post career ==
Kochan announced his retirement on May 17, 2007, after playing the 2006–07 season with the Houston Aeros. He joined the Michigan State Police in 2008, and in 2025 he was joined by a police dog named Roy. He also spent time as a volunteer assistant goaltending coach with the Michigan Tech men's hockey team from 2008–2010 and in 2013–2014. He left the program after former goaltender Joe Shawhan joined the program as its new head coach, who noted that Kochan's available hours had been limited due to his full-time police role.

== Career statistics ==
=== Regular season and playoffs ===
			Regular season										Playoffs
Season	Team	League	GP	W	L	T	OTL	MIN	GA	SO	GAA	SV%	GP	W	L	MIN	GA	SO	GAA	SV%
1990–91	Edgewood High School	HS-WI	—	—	—	—	—	—	—	—	—	—	—	—	—	—	—	—	—	—
1991–92	Sioux City Musketeers	USHL	23	7	10	0	—	1131	100	0	5.31	.875	—	—	—	—	—	—	—	—
1992–93	Kelowna Spartans	BCJHL	44	34	8	0	—	2582	137	1	3.18	.887	15	12	3	927	48	1	3.10	—
1993–94	Northern Michigan University	WCHA	20	9	7	0	—	985	57	2	3.47	.875	—	—	—	—	—	—	—	—
1994–95	Northern Michigan University	WCHA	29	8	17	3	—	1512	107	0	4.25	.880	—	—	—	—	—	—	—	—
1995–96	Northern Michigan University	WCHA	31	7	21	2	—	1627	123	0	4.54	.871	—	—	—	—	—	—	—	—
1996–97	Northern Michigan University	WCHA	26	8	15	2	—	1528	99	0	3.89	.888	—	—	—	—	—	—	—	—
1997–98	Louisville Riverfrogs	ECHL	18	7	9	2	—	980	61	1	3.73	.891	—	—	—	—	—	—	—	—
1998–99	B.C. Icemen	UHL	40	18	16	5	—	2322	115	2	2.97	.907	4	1	2	208	9	0	2.60	.913
1999–00	Tampa Bay Lightning	NHL	5	1	4	0	—	238	17	0	4.28	.847	—	—	—	—	—	—	—	—
1999–00	Springfield Falcons	AHL	2	1	1	0	—	120	5	1	2.50	.921	—	—	—	—	—	—	—	—
1999–00	Orlando Solar Bears	IHL	4	4	0	0	—	240	4	1	1.00	.958	—	—	—	—	—	—	—	—
1999–00	Grand Rapids Griffins	IHL	2	1	0	1	—	93	1	0	0.64	.970	—	—	—	—	—	—	—	—
1999–00	B.C. Icemen	UHL	43	29	11	3	—	2544	110	4	2.59	.922	—	—	—	—	—	—	—	—
2000–01	Tampa Bay Lightning	NHL	10	0	3	0	—	314	18	0	3.44	.870	—	—	—	—	—	—	—	—
2000–01	Detroit Vipers	IHL	49	13	28	3	—	2606	154	0	3.55	.894	—	—	—	—	—	—	—	—
2001–02	Tampa Bay Lightning	NHL	5	0	3	1	—	237	16	0	4.06	.876	—	—	—	—	—	—	—	—
2001–02	Springfield Falcons	AHL	45	21	20	1	—	2518	112	2	2.67	.910	—	—	—	—	—	—	—	—
2002–03	Minnesota Wild	NHL	1	0	1	0	—	60	5	0	5.00	.821	—	—	—	—	—	—	—	—
2002–03	Houston Aeros	AHL	25	15	6	3	—	1447	61	1	2.53	.907	2	0	0	20	0	0	0.00	1.000
2003–04	Bridgeport Sound Tigers	AHL	45	20	17	7	—	2728	85	6	1.87	.933	4	1	3	281	12	0	2.57	.918
2004–05	Bridgeport Sound Tigers	AHL	39	19	19	—	0	2303	102	1	2.66	.914	—	—	—	—	—	—	—	—
2005–06	Sibir Novosibirsk	RSL	8	1	5	—	0	417	23	0	3.31	.872	—	—	—	—	—	—	—	—
2005–06	Portland Pirates	AHL	15	9	4	—	1	838	38	1	2.72	.916	—	—	—	—	—	—	—	—
2006–07	Houston Aeros	AHL	23	6	14	—	1	1188	65	1	3.28	.903	—	—	—	—	—	—	—	—
NHL totals			21	1	11	1	—	849	56	0	3.96	.862	—	—	—	—	—	—	—	—

=== International ===
Year	Team	Event	GP	W	L	T	MIN	GA	SO	GAA	SV%
2002	United States	WC	3	—	—	—	149	5	0	2.01	.918
Senior totals			3	—	—	—	149	5	0	2.01	.918

== Awards and accomplishments ==
- United Hockey League Second All-Star Team (2000)
- Harry "Hap" Holmes Memorial Award (fewest goals against - AHL) (2004) (shared with Wade Dubielewicz)
- Member of Team USA at the 1996, 1997 and 1998 roller hockey World Championships & 1999 Pan American Games
