= Northern Kentucky Nightmare =

Logo

General information
- Founded: 2016
- Folded: 2016
- Headquartered: Highland Heights, Kentucky
- Colors: Light blue, black, white

Personnel
- Owners: W. Leland Bennett III; Kyle Hogan
- Head coach: Mike Goodpaster

Team history
- Northern Kentucky Nightmare (2016)

League / conference affiliations
- American Indoor Football (2016)

The Northern Kentucky Nightmare was a professional indoor football team based in Highland Heights, Kentucky and were members of American Indoor Football that began play in the 2016 season. The Nightmare, who were nominally a replacement for the Northern Kentucky River Monsters (a team that had played in various indoor leagues during the early 2010s), played all their games on the road during the 2016 season. Following the 2016 season, the AIF ceased operations, and the Nightmare were left without a league. In September 2016, owner W. Leland Bennett III was listed as the owner of another proposed Northern Kentucky indoor football team in negotiations with joining the new Arena Developmental League, but were later removed from the league in November.

== Final roster ==
Northern Kentucky Nightmare roster
Quarterbacks: 17 Antonio Davis; 6 Brandon Hanna; Running backs: 13 Jimmy Connor; -- Maurice Grinter; Wide receivers: 9 Mike Brown; 22 Mercier Doucette; 85 Dyshaun Edwards; -- Jason Johnson; 8 Nez Mincy; 1 Robert Redd; 18 Derrick Shearer; 10 Chris Spalding; 36 Lamar Taborn	Offensive linemen: -- Bob Beeler; -- Deon Brooks II; 95 Juleon Harrison; 74 Matt Money; -- Marwan Odeh; 78 Rick Schmeig; Defensive linemen: 95 Demetrius Blasingame; 56 T. J. Gholston; -- Vincent Harris; -- Rico Middlebrooks; 6 Jameel Peeples; 99 Luke Scarborough; 50 Howard Watkins	Linebackers: 32 David Hampton; 35 Luke Kling; 48 Tommie McBride; 59 Keilan Woods; 31 Greg Gillum; Defensive backs: -- Akiel Belfon; 3 Sergio Freeman; 4 T. J. Harris; 22 Antwan Hill; 12 Kyle James; 21 DeMario Pleasant; 2 Justin Williams; 5 Ontario Williams; Kickers: 16 Mitchell Jett	Injured reserve: currently vacant; Transfer list: currently vacant; Refuse to report: currently vacant; rookies in italics Roster updated May 10, 2016; 39 Active, 0 Inactive

== Staff ==
Northern Kentucky Nightmare staff
Front office: Co-owner – W. Leland Bennett III; Co-owner - Kyle Hogan	Head Coach: Head coach – Mike Goodpaster; Assistant coaches: Offensive coordinator – Kyle Hogan

== Statistics and records ==
=== Season record ===
Season	League	Division	Regular season				Postseason results
Season	League	Division	Finish	Wins	Losses	Ties	Postseason results
2016	AIF	Northern	10th	0	5	0	

=== Head coaches' records ===
Name	Term	Regular season				Playoffs		Awards
Name	Term	W	L	T	Win%	W	L	Awards
Mike Goodpaster	2016	0	5	0	.000	—	—	

== 2016 season ==
Key

Win Tie Loss Bye

=== Regular season ===
All start times were local to home team

Week	Day	Date	Kickoff	Opponent	Results		Location
Week	Day	Date	Kickoff	Opponent	Score	Record	Location
1	Saturday	February 27	7:05pm	at River City Raiders	L 6–47	0–1	Family Arena
2	BYE						
3	Sunday	March 13	7:00pm	at Chicago Blitz	L 22–33	0–2	Odeum Expo Center
4	Sunday	March 20	7:05pm	at West Michigan Ironmen	L 37–65	0–3	L. C. Walker Arena
5	BYE						
6	BYE						
7	Saturday	April 9	7:05pm	at Chicago Blitz	L 24–36	0–4	Odeum Expo Center
8	BYE						
9	BYE						
10	Saturday	April 30	7:00pm	at West Michigan Ironmen	L 27–55	0–5	L. C. Walker Arena
11	Sunday	May 8	3:05pm	at River City Raiders	Cancelled		Family Arena
12	BYE						
13	BYE						
14	BYE						

=== Standings ===
2016 AIF Northern standings
Team	W	L	PCT
y – West Michigan Ironmen	6	1	.857
x – River City Raiders	6	1	.857
x – Lehigh Valley Steelhawks	6	2	.750
Philadelphia Yellow Jackets	4	3	.571
Central Penn Capitals	4	4	.500
Chicago Blitz	3	3	.500
Triangle Torch	3	4	.429
Winston Wildcats	3	5	.375
Maryland Eagles	0	2	.000
Northern Kentucky Nightmare	0	5	.000
