= 2016 River City Raiders season =

- Owner: Free Tickets Entertainment, LLC
- General manager: Lin Hart, Jr.
- Head coach: Corey Bethany
- Home stadium: Family Arena; 2002 Arena Parkway; St. Charles, MO 63303

Results
- Record: 6-1
- Division place: 2nd
- Playoffs: Lost Divisional Semifinals 52-54 (Steelhawks)

The 2016 River City Raiders season was the fourth season for the American indoor football franchise, and their first in American Indoor Football (AIF).

== Schedule ==
Key: Win Tie Loss Bye

=== Regular season ===
All start times are local to home team

| Week | Day | Date | Kickoff | Opponent | Results | | Location |
| Week | Day | Date | Kickoff | Opponent | Score | Record | Location |
|---|---|---|---|---|---|---|---|
| 1 | Saturday | February 27 | 7:05pm | Northern Kentucky Nightmare | W 47-6 | 1-0 | Family Arena |
| 2 | BYE | | | | | | |
| 3 | Sunday | March 12 | 3:05pm | West Michigan Ironmen | W 75-68 | 2-0 | Family Arena |
| 4 | BYE | | | | | | |
| 5 | BYE | | | | | | |
| 6 | Sunday | April 3 | 3:05pm | Cincinnati Bulldogs | W 81-14 | 3-0 | Family Arena |
| 7 | Saturday | April 9 | 7:05pm | at West Michigan Ironmen | L 49-69 | 3-1 | L. C. Walker Arena |
| 8 | BYE | | | | | | |
| 9 | Saturday | April 23 | 7:05pm | Chicago Blitz | W 47-34 | 4-1 | Family Arena |
| 10 | BYE | | | | | | |
| ~~11~~ | ~~Sunday~~ | ~~May 8~~ | ~~3:05pm~~ | ~~Northern Kentucky Nightmare~~ | Cancelled | | ~~Family Arena~~ |
| 11 | Friday | May 6 | 6:05pm | Missouri Rampage | W 62-13 | 5-1 | Family Arena |
| 12 | Saturday | May 14 | 7:05pm | at Chicago Blitz | W 37-31 | 6-1 | Odeum Expo Center |
| 13 | BYE | | | | | | |
| 14 | BYE | | | | | | |

=== Standings ===
2016 AIF Northern standings
| Team | W | L | PCT |
|---|---|---|---|
| y – West Michigan Ironmen | 6 | 1 | .857 |
| x – River City Raiders | 6 | 1 | .857 |
| x – Lehigh Valley Steelhawks | 6 | 2 | .750 |
| Philadelphia Yellow Jackets | 4 | 3 | .571 |
| Central Penn Capitals | 4 | 4 | .500 |
| Chicago Blitz | 3 | 3 | .500 |
| Triangle Torch | 3 | 4 | .429 |
| Winston Wildcats | 3 | 5 | .375 |
| Maryland Eagles | 0 | 2 | .000 |
| Northern Kentucky Nightmare | 0 | 5 | .000 |

=== Playoffs ===
All start times are local to home team

| Round | Day | Date | Kickoff | Opponent | Score | Location |
|---|---|---|---|---|---|---|
| Div. Semifinals | Monday | June 6 | 7:00pm | Lehigh Valley Steelhawks | L 52-54 | Family Arena |

== Roster ==
2016 River City Raiders roster
| Quarterbacks: 3 Tarean Austin; Running backs: 6 Tyler Batts; 36 Lennies McFerren; 33 Deon Morris; Wide receivers: 18 DuJuan Bolden; 8 Chris Headd; 11 DeAndre Jackson; 14 Johnnie King; 83 Courtney Ward; 81 Chris Willis | Offensive linemen: 74 K. C. Giger; 50 Jerry Johnson; 54 John Johnson; 72 Lawrence Smith; Defensive linemen: 29 Gary Henderson; 57 Keenan Mace; 5 Jason Null; 90 Bernard Quinn | Linebackers: 38 Haylon Jacobs; 13 Kyle Walker; Defensive backs: 10 Theo Alexander; 2 Marcus Cotton; 21 Timothy Hamm-Bey; 7 Travonti Johnson; 1 Bryan Lowery; 32 Reggie Jennings; 9 Patrick Wells; Kickers: 4 Corey Adamson | Injured reserve: currently vacant; Exempt list: currently vacant; rookies in italics Roster updated May 5, 2016; 28 Active, 0 Inactive |
