= 2016 Chicago Blitz season =

- Owner: Mike Oliver
- General manager: Michael Dortch
- Head coach: Mike Oliver
- Home stadium: Odeum Expo Center; 1033 North Villa Avenue; Villa Park, IL 60181

Results
- Record: 3-3
- Division place: 6th
- Playoffs: did not qualify

The 2016 Chicago Blitz season was the third season for the American Indoor Football franchise, and their second season in the AIF. On May 25, the Blitz cancelled its last scheduled road game and announced that the team was for sale.

== Schedule ==
Key: Win Tie Loss Bye

=== Regular season ===
All start times are local to home team

Week	Day	Date	Kickoff	Opponent	Results		Location
Week	Day	Date	Kickoff	Opponent	Score	Record	Location
1	BYE						
2	BYE						
3	Sunday	March 13	7:00pm	Northern Kentucky Nightmare	W 33-22	1-0	Odeum Expo Center
4	BYE						
5	BYE						
6	Saturday	April 2	7:00pm	at West Michigan Ironmen	L 30-34	1-1	L. C. Walker Arena
7	Saturday	April 9	7:00pm	Northern Kentucky Nightmare	W 36-24	2-1	Odeum Expo Center
8	BYE						
9	Saturday	April 23	7:05pm	at River City Raiders	L 34-47	2-2	Family Arena
10	BYE						
11	Saturday	May 7	7:00pm	Memphis X-Sounds	W 73-6	3-2	Odeum Expo Center
12	Saturday	May 14	7:05pm	River City Raiders	L 31-37	3-3	Odeum Expo Center
13	BYE						
~~14~~	~~Saturday~~	~~May 28~~	~~7:00pm~~	~~West Michigan Ironmen~~	Cancelled		~~Odeum Expo Center~~

==== Game 2: vs. West Michigan Ironmen ====
Game 2: Chicago Blitz at West Michigan Ironmen – Game summary

Quarter	1	2	3	4	Total
Blitz	6	6	6	12	30
Ironmen	14	7	7	6	34

at L. C. Walker Arena, Muskegon, Michigan

- Date: April 2, 2016
- Game time: 7:00 p.m. CT
- Game weather: None (indoor arena)
- Game attendance: 2,800

Game information

First quarter

- WM – Derek Vandenbosch 3-yard fumble return (Jose Diaz kick), 13:23. Ironmen 7–0.
- CHI – James Walton 29-yard pass from Demetrius Jones (Julie Harshbarger kick failed), 7:02. Ironmen 7–6.
- WM – Derrick Eshelman 15-yard pass from Alex Carder (Jose Diaz kick), 2:36. Ironmen 14–6.

Second quarter

- CHI – Brian Miles 7-yard pass from Demetrius Jones (2-pt failed), 10:06. Ironmen 14–12.
- WM – Erik Thompson 51-yard field goal return (Jose Diaz kick), :46. Ironmen 21–12.

Third quarter

- WM – Ronald Johnson 4-yard pass from Alex Carder (Jose Diaz kick), 10:55. Ironmen 28–12.
- CHI – Bryant Pascascio 3-yard pass from Tony Powell (2-pt failed), 7:22. Ironmen 28–18.

Fourth quarter

- CHI – James Walton 1-yard pass from Tony Powell (Julie Harshbarger kick failed), 12:21. Ironmen 28–24.
- CHI – Keenan Miller 4-yard pass from Tony Powell (Julie Harshbarger kick failed), :46. Blitz 30–28.
- WM – Erik Thompson 48-yard kick return (2-pt failed), :28. Ironmen 34–30.

Top passers

- WM – Alex Carder – 7/20, 79 yards, 2 TD, INT

==== Game 3: vs. Northern Kentucky Nightmare ====
Game 3: Northern Kentucky Nightmare at Chicago Blitz – Game summary

Quarter	1	2	3	4	Total
Nightmare	6	12	6	0	24
Blitz	20	7	0	9	36

at Odeum Expo Center, Villa Park, Illinois

- Date: April 9, 2016
- Game time: 7:00 p.m. CT
- Game weather: None (indoor arena)
- TV announcers: Kyle Smith (play-by-play) and Al Stasch (analyst)

Game information
First quarter
- CHI – Keenan Miller 5-yard run (Igor Materic kick), 13:18. Blitz 7–0.
- NK – Jimmy Connor 30-yard run (run failed), 10:32. Blitz 7–6.
- CHI – Bryant Pascascio 9-yard pass from Tony Powell (Igor Materic kick), 8:33. Blitz 14–6.
- CHI – Keenan Miller 1-yard run (Igor Materic kick failed), 1:36. Blitz 20–6.

Second quarter

- NK – Justin Williams 21-yard pass from Antonio Davis (Mike Brown kick failed), 14:41. Blitz 20–12.
- CHI – Brian Miles 46-yard kickoff return (Igor Materic kick), 13:48. Blitz 27–12.
- NK – Keilan Woods 4-yard pass from Antonio Davis (Pass failed), 5:47. Blitz 27–18.

Third quarter

- NK – Antonio Davis 4-yard run (Pass failed), 8:13. Blitz 27–24.

Fourth quarter

- CHI – Igor Materic 30-yard field goal (Igor Materic kick), 12:28. Blitz 30–24.
- CHI – Deshon Conley 48-yard interception return (Igor Materic kick blocked), :13. Blitz 36–24.

=== Standings ===
2016 AIF Northern standings
Team	W	L	PCT
y – West Michigan Ironmen	6	1	.857
x – River City Raiders	6	1	.857
x – Lehigh Valley Steelhawks	6	2	.750
Philadelphia Yellow Jackets	4	3	.571
Central Penn Capitals	4	4	.500
Chicago Blitz	3	3	.500
Triangle Torch	3	4	.429
Winston Wildcats	3	5	.375
Maryland Eagles	0	2	.000
Northern Kentucky Nightmare	0	5	.000

== Roster ==
2016 Chicago Blitz roster
Quarterbacks: 9 Andre Locke; Running backs: 17 Keenan Miller; 30 Lloyd Morgan; Wide receivers: 11 David Brown; -- Brian Miles; 3 Bryan Pascascio; 12 Jermel Smith; 6 James Walton	Offensive linemen: 56 Anthony Bullock; 66 Darius Crosby; 55 Tim Mueller; 57 Nick Torresso; 77 Baptiste Williams; Defensive linemen: 5 Karl Grant; 18 Ramon Lacey; 8 DeAndre Mosley; 90 Ryan O'Neil; 96 Evan Van Klei; 66 Marquis Walton	Linebackers: 1 Greg Barksdale; 13 Zo Hood; 44 Shannon Newsberry; Defensive backs: 14 Jorrick Calvin; 21 Deshon Conley; 7 Darius Jones; 4 Brandon Onuselogu; 28 Robert Riley; 12 Leo Watkins; 24 Keith Woodson; Kickers: 19 Igor Materic	Injured reserve: 2 Demetrius Jones QB (IR); Exempt list: 93 Tyrone Saunders DL (Exempt); Practice squad: currently vacant; rookies in italics Roster updated May 12, 2016; 30 Active, 2 Inactive → More rosters
