= B.C. Icemen =

- City: Binghamton, New York
- League: United Hockey League
- Founded: 1997
- Home arena: Broome County Veterans Memorial Arena
- Colors: Blue, black, silver, white

Franchise history
- 1997–2002: B.C. Icemen

Championships
- Division titles: 2 (1998–99, 1999–00)

The B.C. Icemen were an ice hockey team in the United Hockey League (UHL). They played in Binghamton, New York, at the Broome County Veterans Memorial Arena.

== History ==
In 1997, the owners of the American Hockey League (AHL)'s Binghamton Rangers moved their franchise to Hartford, Connecticut, as the Hartford Wolf Pack. The team was replaced by the B.C. ("Broome County") Icemen of the lower-level United Hockey League (UHL). The B.C. Icemen logo was created by Endicott native, nationally syndicated cartoonist Johnny Hart, creator of the comic strip B.C.; the logo featured a stylized caveman, similar to those depicted in his comic strip, playing ice hockey. In 2001, the original local owners, Dave Pace, Mark Palombo, and Patrick Snyder, sold the franchise and the new owner, David Wright then initiated a move to bring back the AHL. Wright was forced to declare bankruptcy, but a new ownership group followed his lead and the Binghamton Senators, farm club of the Ottawa Senators of the National Hockey League (NHL), arrived. Former B.C. Icemen include Keith Aucoin, Pete Vandermeer, Chris Allen, Dieter Kochan Brad Jones, and Boyd Kane.

The market was previously served by: Broome Dusters of the NAHL (1970–1977), Binghamton Whalers of the AHL (1980–1990), and the Binghamton Rangers of the AHL (1990–1997)
The franchise was followed by: Binghamton Senators of the AHL (2002–2017)
Binghamton Devils of the AHL (2017–2021)
Binghamton Black Bears of the Federal Prospects Hockey League (FPHL) (2021–present)

== Year-by-year record ==
Season	GP	W	L	OTL	GF	GA	Pts	Standing	Playoffs
1997–98	74	25	40	9	237	339	59	4th, East	Did not qualify
1998–99	74	39	30	5	280	238	83	1st, East	Lost in round 1
1999–00	74	47	20	7	279	222	101	1st, East	Lost in Round 1
2000–01	74	31	34	9	263	290	71	3rd, Northeast	Did not qualify
2001–02	74	39	27	8	233	237	86	4th, East	Lost in round 2

== Team records ==
Goals: 52 Chris Grenville (Canada) (2000–01)
Assists: 59 Patrice Robitaille (Canada) (1999-00)
Points: 109 Chris Grenville (Canada) (2000–01)
Penalty minutes: 390 Pete Vandermeer (Canada) (1998–99)
GAA: 2.34 Erasmo Saltarelli (Canada) (2001–02)
SV%: .933 Erasmo Saltarelli (Canada) (2001–02)
Career goals: 160 Chris Grenville (Canada)
Career assists: 146 Chris Grenville (Canada)
Career points: 306 Chris Grenville (Canada)
Career penalty minutes: 643 Matt Ruchty (Canada)
Career goaltending wins: 47 Dieter Kochan (Canada)
Career shutouts: 6 Dieter Kochan (Canada)
Career games: 303 Justin Plamondon (Canada)
