= Adirondack Frostbite =

Ice hockey team in New York, U.S.

- City: Glens Falls, New York
- League: United Hockey League
- Founded: 1994
- Home arena: Glens Falls Civic Center
- Colors: Stratos, sundance, cornflower, white
- Owners: Steve Levy; Barry Melrose

Franchise history
- 1994–1997: Utica Blizzard
- 1997–1999: Winston-Salem IceHawks
- 1999–2004: Adirondack IceHawks
- 2004–2006: Adirondack Frostbite

The Adirondack Frostbite were a minor professional ice hockey team based in Glens Falls, New York, and were a member of the United Hockey League (UHL). They played their home games at the Glens Falls Civic Center.

The Adirondack IceHawks UHL team came to Glens Falls in 1999, after the American Hockey League's (AHL) Adirondack Red Wings disbanded. The IceHawks were a relocation of the Winston-Salem IceHawks from Winston-Salem, North Carolina. In 2004, ESPN SportsCenter anchor Steve Levy and NHL analyst Barry Melrose became the team's owners and the team changed its name to the Frostbite.

On January 13, 2006, head coach Marc Potvin was found dead in his hotel room in Kalamazoo, Michigan, hours before his team was to play the Kalamazoo Wings.

The Frostbite suspended operations on June 12, 2006, after the team could not come to a lease agreement with the Glens Falls Civic Center. Professional hockey would not return to the Adirondack region until 2009 when the AHL's Philadelphia Phantoms relocated to become the Adirondack Phantoms.
