= Winston-Salem Entertainment-Sports Complex =

Sports complex in Winston-Salem, North Carolina

Winston-Salem Entertainment-Sports Complex logo

The Winston-Salem Entertainment-Sports Complex is a group of arenas, sports venues, and entertainment venues in Winston-Salem, North Carolina, United States. The complex consists of six structures, five of which are found in the same area along Deacon Boulevard in the city's North Ward. The complex is championed by the Lawrence Joel Veterans Memorial Coliseum (LJVM Coliseum) and its own complex, which includes the LJVM Coliseum Annex and Education Building. The Winston-Salem Fairgrounds are intertwined with LJVM Complex. Across the road from the LJVM Coliseum lies BB&T Field, a football stadium, and Gene Hooks Field, a baseball stadium. Bowman Gray Stadium, a race track and football field, is considered part of the Winston-Salem Entertainment-Sports Complex, but it is not found in the vicinity of the other venues. It is found along Martin Luther King, Jr. Boulevard southeast of downtown. BB&T Ballpark is also part of the complex and is located in downtown at the intersection of Business 40 and North Carolina Highway 150.

The complex is used by sports teams from Wake Forest University (Demon Deacons) and Winston-Salem State University (Rams). The Winston-Salem Dash baseball team played at Gene Hooks Field until 2009 (but now play at Truist Stadium formerly BB&T Ballpark starting in 2010).

The Winston-Salem Memorial Coliseum was the city's old multi-purpose arena and was demolished and replaced by the LJVM Coliseum in 1989.
