= 1998–99 UHL season =

- Finals champions: Muskegon Fury

Seasons
- ← 1997–98 1999–00 →

The 1998–99 United Hockey League season was the eighth season of the United Hockey League (Colonial Hockey League before 1997), a North American minor professional league. 11 teams participated in the regular season and the Muskegon Fury won the league title.

== Regular season ==
Central Division	GP	W	L	T	GF	GA	Pts
Muskegon Fury	74	50	18	6	304	208	106

Eastern Division	GP	W	L	T	GF	GA	Pts
B. C. Icemen	74	39	30	5	280	238	83
Asheville Smoke	74	36	35	3	292	331	75
Winston-Salem Icehawks	74	31	40	3	245	311	65
Mohawk Valley Prowlers	74	27	39	8	214	300	62

West Division	GP	W	L	T	GF	GA	Pts
Port Huron Border Cats	74	41	26	7	261	239	89
Flint Generals	74	37	32	5	318	299	79
Saginaw Gears	74	20	46	8	212	332	48

Western Division	GP	W	L	T	GF	GA	Pts
Quad City Mallards	74	50	19	5	364	253	105
Thunder Bay Thunder Cats	74	47	20	7	325	247	101
Madison Monsters	74	29	40	5	237	294	63

== Colonial Cup-Playoffs ==
Colonial Cup-Quarterfinals
C1	Muskegon Fury	4
E3	Winston-Salem Icehawks	1
E1	B. C. Icemen	1
WT2	Flint Generals	4
WN1	Quad City Mallards	4
E2	Asheville Smoke	0
WT1	Port Huron Border Cats	3
WN2	Thunder Bay Thunder Cats	4

Colonial Cup-Semifinals
C1	Muskegon Fury	4
WT2	Flint Generals	3
WN1	Quad City Mallards	4
WN2	Thunder Bay Thunder Cats	2

Colonial Cup-Final
C1	Muskegon Fury	4
WN1	Quad City Mallards	2
