= Empire State Cobras =

- City: Glens Falls, New York
- Founded: 1994
- Home arena: Glens Falls Civic Center
- Colors: Black, Red, Grey, White
- Murphy Cups: None
- Conference Championships: None
- Division Championships: 1996

Franchise history
- Phoenix Cobras (1994 - 1995) Empire State Cobras (1996) Buffalo Wings (1997 - 1999)

The Empire State Cobras were a one-year franchise in Roller Hockey International during the summer of 1996, based in Glens Falls, New York. The Cobras drew fewer than 1,000 per game at home and owner Jerry Shorthouse ran out of money before the end of the season.

Most of the Cobras’ roster came over from the defunct Buffalo Stampede franchise (1994-1995), which won RHI’s Murphy Cup in 1994. Although the club was good and won the Atlantic Division with a 16-7-5 record, the Cobras reportedly had to sell their home court advantage in the playoffs to the lower-seeded Orlando Jackals. They lost to the eventual champion Jackals in the first round. In January 1997, the Cobras returned to Buffalo under new ownership and changed their name to the Buffalo Wings. Roller Hockey International suspended operations in late 1997. After sitting out 1998, the league re-organized for one final season in 1999 and then folded.
