= Adirondack Junior Thunder =

Junior ice hockey team in New York, US

Atlantic City Seals
- City: Atlantic City, New Jersey
- League: EHLP
- Division: South
- Founded: 2022
- Home arena: Atlantic City Skate Zone
- Colors
- Owner: Matt Lemma
- General manager: Matt Lemma
- Head coach: Matt Lemma
- Media: The Post-Star
- Affiliates: Adirondack Thunder (ECHL)

Franchise history
- 2022–2025: Adirondack Jr. Thunder
- 2025–present: Atlantic City Seals

The Atlantic City Seals are a junior ice hockey team in the Eastern Hockey League Premier based in Atlantic City, New Jersey. They will play home games out of the Atlantic City Skate Zone.

The team was founded as the Adirondack Jr. Thunder based in Glens Falls, New York. They were established in 2022, and play home games out of the Cool Insuring Arena. The franchise was purchased and relocated after the completion of the 2024-25 season.

== Team ==
The team was announced on January 20, 2022, under the ownership of Todd Tierney and Tadd Sipowicz, and is managed by Jeff Mead. Sipowicz and Mead are the Chief Revenue Officer and President of Business Operations, respectively, for the ECHL's Adirondack Thunder.

On the same day, they announced the team's first head coach would be Adirondack Red Wings all-time points and games-played leader Glenn Merkosky. Merkosky has head coaching experience with the Sudbury Wolves from 1992 to 1996, and the Adirondack Red Wings from 1996 to 1999.

They play in the Eastern Hockey League Premier (EHLP) a development league for the Eastern Hockey League, within Tier III junior hockey.

The team fills a gap in Upstate New York hockey, citing the loss of local youth players to other areas to play junior hockey before college. The team is largely made up of local players from the Glens Falls and Albany area.

== Season-by-season records ==
Updated December 27, 2022.

Regular season										Playoffs
Season	GP	W	L	OTL	SOL	Pts	GF	GA	Standing	Playoffs
2022–23	42	30	6	4	2	66	206	126	1st of 5, New Eng. 2nd of 15 EHLP	Lost Div Semis 0-2 (New Hampshire Avalanche)
2023–24	42	28	8	4	2	62	194	141	1st of 5, New Eng. 5th of 16 EHLP	Lost Div Semis 0-2 (Vermont Lumberjacks)
2024–25	42	25	16	0	1	51	191	153	2nd of 5, North Div; 8th of 16 EHLP	Won Div Semis 2-0 (New Hampshire Avalanche); Lost Div. Finals 1-2 (New England Wolves); Advance to Regional as Wild Card; Lost Mid-Atlantic Regional 1-2 (New Jersey 87's)
Atlantic City Seals
2025-26	42	25	12	0	5	55	187	143	-2nd of 6-South; 4th of 12 EHLP	Won Div Semifinals ?-? (Union Thunder); Lost Conf Finals ?-? (New jersey 87's)

== Players and personnel ==
=== Current roster ===
Updated December 21, 2023.

No.	Nat	Player	Pos	S/G	Age	Acquired	Birthplace
2	(United States)	Brayden Moynihan	F	L	20	2023	Charleton, New York
10	(United States)	Angelo Fuda	F	L	22	2022	Schenectady, New York
14	(United States)	Jacob Badar	F	R	20	2023	Saratoga, New York
16	(Canada)	Kyler Leboutillier	F	R	24	2023	Ottawa, Ontario
20	(Canada)	Josh Arrobas	F	R	22	2023	Montreal, Quebec
21	(United States)	Ayden Rodriguez	F	R	20	2022	Dingmans Ferry, Pennsylvania
22	(United States)	Mack Ryan	F	L	21	2022	Queensbury, New York
23	(United States)	Quinn Theis	F	L	21	2022	Queensbury, New York
25	(United States)	Colin Fish	F	L	22	2023	Watervliet, New York
27	(United States)	Cole Davidson	F	R	21	2023	Averill Park, New York
40	(United States)	Jordan Dickinson (C)	F	L	22	2022	South Glens Falls, New York
3	(Canada)	Landen Jerome	D	R	19	2023	Val-d'Or, Quebec
7	(United States)	Nick Ogden	D	L	21	2022	Queensbury, New York
8	(United States)	Trent Trahan	D	R	22	2022	Chazy, New York
9	(United States)	Jim Fitzgerald (C)	D	L	23	2022	Queensbury, New York
12	(United States)	Parker Caswell	D	L	21	2023	Ballston Spa, New York
17	(United States)	Hunter Bradley	D	L	20	2023	Middle Grove, New York
41	(United States)	Frank Klaus	D	R	21	2022	Saratoga Springs, New York
30	(United States)	Connor Traver	G	L	21	2023	Hudson Falls, New York
31	(United States)	Andy Buser	G	L	23	2022	South Glens Falls, New York
35	(United States)	AJ Murphy	G	L	21	2023	Auburn, New York

== Head coaches ==
- Glenn Merkosky, 2022–present
