= Phoenix Cobras =

Defunct roller hockey team

- City: Phoenix, Arizona
- Founded: 1994
- Home arena: Arizona Veterans Memorial Coliseum
- Colors: Red, Black, Yellow, White
- Murphy Cups: None
- Conference Championships: None
- Division Championships: None

Franchise history
- Phoenix Cobras (1994–1995) Empire State Cobras (1996) Buffalo Wings (1997–1999)

The Phoenix Cobras were a professional roller hockey team based in Phoenix, Arizona, United States that played in Roller Hockey International.

The team folded after the 1995 season, was sold and moved to the Albany, New York, area and changed their name to the Empire State Cobras.
