= Winston-Salem Fairgrounds Arena =

Arena in North Carolina, United States

Coordinates: 36°7′39″N 80°15′28″W

- Interactive map of Winston-Salem Fairgrounds Arena
- Former names: LJVM Coliseum Annex (1989–2014); Winston-Salem Fairgrounds Annex (2014–2024)
- Location: 414 Deacon Blvd, Winston-Salem, North Carolina 27105
- Owner: City of Winston-Salem
- Capacity: 4,000
- Surface: 200' x 85' (hockey)

Construction
- Opened: 1989

Tenants
- Winston-Salem Thunderbirds (ECHL) 1989–1992; Winston-Salem Mammoths (SHL) 1995–1996; Winston-Salem IceHawks (UHL) 1997–1999; Winston-Salem Parrots (ACHL) 2002–2003; Winston-Salem T-Birds (SEHL) 2003–2004; Winston-Salem Polar Twins (SPHL) 2004–2005; Twin City Cyclones (SPHL) 2007–2009; Winston Wildcats (AIF) 2016; Twin City Thunderbirds (FPHL) 2017–present

Website
- wsfairgrounds.com

The Winston-Salem Fairgrounds Arena (formerly named the LJVM Coliseum Annex and later the Winston-Salem Fairgrounds Annex) is a 4,000-seat multi-purpose arena in Winston-Salem, North Carolina built in 1989. Since 2017, it has been home to the Carolina Thunderbirds, a minor league hockey team in the Federal Prospects Hockey League. It was formerly home to the Winston-Salem Thunderbirds, Winston-Salem Mammoths, Winston-Salem IceHawks, Winston-Salem T-Birds, Winston-Salem Polar Twins, and Twin City Cyclones ice hockey teams. It also serves as an occasional concert venue, hosting Bob Dylan on two occasions, in 1991 and 2002.

It was originally part of the Lawrence Joel Veterans Memorial Coliseum, which used to be part of the larger Winston-Salem Sports and Entertainment Complex, and was named the LJVM Coliseum Annex. In 2013, the city sold the Coliseum to Wake Forest University and renamed the complex and smaller arena to Winston-Salem Fairgrounds in 2014. It is located adjacent to the Winston-Salem Fairgrounds. In 2024, the Annex was renamed to the Winston-Salem Fairgrounds Arena.

The Winston-Salem Fairgrounds Arena was home to the Winston Wildcats, an indoor football team that was part of American Indoor Football and later independent.
