= Glenn Merkosky =

Canadian ice hockey player

- Born: April 8, 1960 (age 65) Edmonton, Alberta, Canada
- Height: 5 ft 10 in (178 cm)
- Weight: 185 lb (84 kg; 13 st 3 lb)
- Position: Centre
- Shot: Left
- Played for: Hartford Whalers; New Jersey Devils; Detroit Red Wings
- NHL draft: Undrafted
- Playing career: 1980–1991

Glenn M. Merkosky (born April 8, 1960) is a Canadian former professional ice hockey player. He played in several leagues, most notably playing 66 games across 5 non-consecutive seasons in the National Hockey League (1981–90), during which time he played with the New Jersey Devils, Hartford Whalers, and Detroit Red Wings. Merkosky also played 10 consecutive seasons in the American Hockey League (1980–91), 1 season in the Central Hockey League (1982–83), and 1 season in the German Deutsche Eishockey Liga (1987–88).

Merkosky started out playing in Canadian in junior hockey leagues, such as playing 1 season (1976–77) in the Kootenay International Junior Hockey League, 1 season (1977–78) in the British Columbia Hockey League, and 3 non-consecutive seasons (1976–80) in the Western Hockey League.

After retiring as a player he became head coach of the Ontario Hockey League's Sudbury Wolves (1992–96) and then of the American Hockey League's Adirondack Red Wings (1996–99). From 1999 to 2019 he worked as a pro scout for the Detroit Red Wings. As of the 2022–23 season, Merkosky worked as the General Manager and Head Coach for Adirondack Junior Thunder, a junior hockey team.

== Career statistics ==
=== Regular season and playoffs ===
			Regular season					Playoffs
Season	Team	League	GP	G	A	Pts	PIM	GP	G	A	Pts	PIM
1976–77	Grand Forks Border Bruins	KIJHL	—	—	—	—	—	—	—	—	—	—
1976–77	Kamloops Chiefs	WCHL	5	0	2	2	0	—	—	—	—	—
1977–78	Kamloops Chiefs	BCJHL	61	55	91	146	66	—	—	—	—	—
1977–78	Seattle Breakers	WCHL	6	4	3	7	2	—	—	—	—	—
1978–79	Michigan Tech University	WCHA	38	14	29	43	22	—	—	—	—	—
1979–80	Calgary Wranglers	WHL	72	49	40	89	95	7	4	6	10	14
1980–81	Binghamton Whalers	AHL	80	26	35	61	61	5	0	2	2	2
1981–82	Binghamton Whalers	AHL	72	29	40	69	83	10	0	2	2	2
1981–82	Hartford Whalers	NHL	7	0	0	0	2	—	—	—	—	—
1982–83	New Jersey Devils	NHL	34	4	10	14	20	—	—	—	—	—
1982–83	Wichita Wind	CHL	45	26	23	49	15	—	—	—	—	—
1983–84	Maine Mariners	AHL	75	28	28	56	56	17	11	10	21	20
1983–84	New Jersey Devils	NHL	5	1	0	1	0	—	—	—	—	—
1984–85	Maine Mariners	AHL	80	38	38	76	19	11	2	3	5	13
1985–86	Adirondack Red Wings	AHL	59	24	33	57	22	17	5	7	12	15
1985–86	Detroit Red Wings	NHL	17	0	2	2	0	—	—	—	—	—
1986–87	Adirondack Red Wings	AHL	77	54	31	85	66	11	6	8	14	7
1987–88	Sportbund DJK Rosenheim	GER	16	2	3	5	17	—	—	—	—	—
1987–88	Adirondack Red Wings	AHL	66	34	42	76	34	11	4	6	10	4
1988–89	Adirondack Red Wings	AHL	76	31	46	77	13	17	8	11	19	10
1989–90	Adirondack Red Wings	AHL	75	33	31	64	29	6	2	1	3	6
1989–90	Detroit Red Wings	NHL	3	0	0	0	0	—	—	—	—	—
1990–91	Adirondack Red Wings	AHL	77	28	29	57	37	2	1	1	2	0
AHL totals			737	325	353	678	420	107	39	51	90	79
NHL totals			66	5	12	17	22	—	—	—	—	—
