= 1997–98 UHL season =

- Finals champions: Quad City Mallards

Seasons
- ← 1996–97 1998–99 →

The 1997–98 United Hockey League season was the seventh season of the United Hockey League (the Colonial Hockey League before 1997), a North American minor professional league. Ten teams participated in the regular season and the Quad City Mallards won the league title.

== Regular season ==
East Division	GP	W	L	T	GF	GA	Pts
Flint Generals	74	46	22	6	371	278	98
Brantford Smoke	74	33	27	14	312	307	80
Port Huron Border Cats	74	31	33	10	256	303	72
Winston-Salem Icehawks	74	33	38	3	228	305	69
B. C. Icemen	74	25	40	9	237	339	59
Saginaw Lumber Kings	74	23	46	5	231	342	51

West Division	GP	W	L	T	GF	GA	Pts
Quad City Mallards	74	55	18	1	360	257	111
Muskegon Fury	74	43	23	8	341	244	94
Thunder Bay Thunder Cats	74	42	26	6	337	304	90
Madison Monsters	74	39	24	11	271	265	89

== Colonial Cup-Playoffs ==
Colonial Cup-Quarterfinals
W1	Quad City Mallards	4
W4	Madison Monsters	3
W2	Muskegon Fury	4
W3	Thunder Bay Thunder Cats	1
E1	Flint Generals	4
E5	B. C. Icemen	1
E2	Brantford Smoke	4
E3	Port Huron Border Cats	0

Colonial Cup-Semifinals
W1	Quad City Mallards	4
W2	Muskegon Fury	2
E1	Flint Generals	4
E2	Brantford Smoke	1

Colonial Cup-Final
W1	Quad City Mallards	4
E1	Flint Generals	3
