= Class of 1923 Arena =

Ice rink in Philadelphia, Pennsylvania

Coordinates: 39.9517°N 75.1871°W

- "Penn Ice Rink"
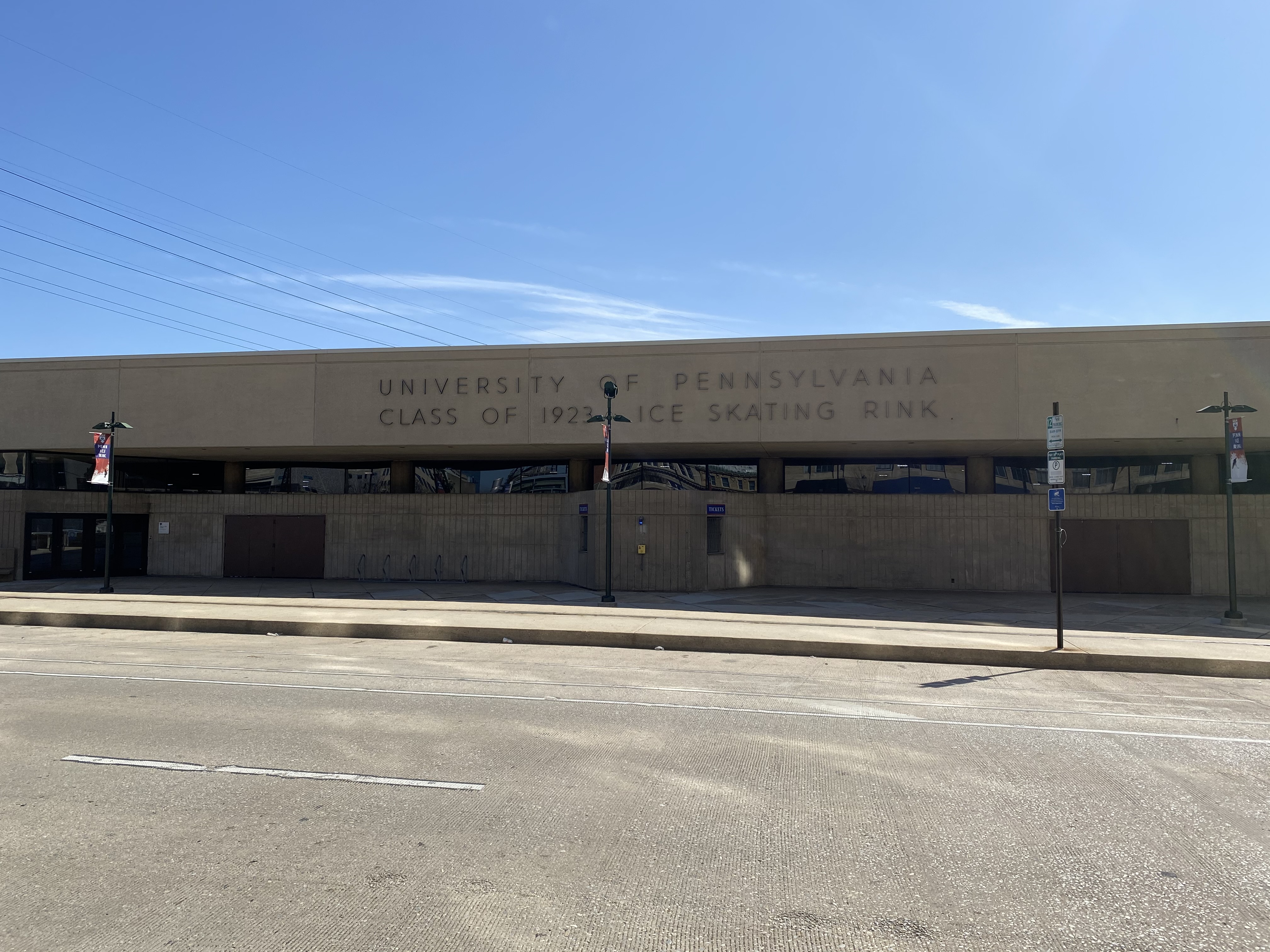
- Interactive map of Class of 1923 Arena
- Location: 3130 Walnut Street; Philadelphia, Pennsylvania 19104
- Owner: University of Pennsylvania
- Operator: University of Pennsylvania Business Services
- Capacity: 2,500 (hockey/indoor football)
- Surface: Ice; 85 ft (26 m) × 200 ft (61 m)

Construction
- Groundbreaking: 1968
- Opened: Fall 1970
- Architect: Robert S. McMillan Associates

Tenants
- Penn Quakers (NCAA, 1972–1978; ACHA, 1978–present); Philadelphia Yellow Jackets (AIF) (2016); Philadelphia Rebels (NAHL) (2017–2018)

Website
- www.upenn.edu/icerink

The Class of 1923 Arena is the skating rink of the University of Pennsylvania.

In 1968, alumni from the Class of 1923 formed the group "Friends of Pennsylvania Hockey," led by Howard Butcher, III. Butcher himself donated over $3 million for the creation of the facility, and along with John Cleveland and Bill R. Wise, organized the largest class donation in the history of the university. The arena was named after the class to commemorate its generosity.

The arena is located in the eastern part of Penn's campus in the University City section of Philadelphia. It can seat nearly 3,000 people. The building, designed by Robert S. McMillan Associates, was constructed primarily of poured concrete and is supported by four 22-foot concrete columns. The lower concourse includes locker rooms for the university's teams, food services, and the "Quaker Room", which overlooks the rink. The ice surface itself measures 85' × 200' and totals 18,000 square feet (1,700 m^{2}). The upper concourse includes restrooms and old concession stands that are no longer in use, with entrances on Walnut Street.

The Class of 1923 Arena is the second-largest collegiate hockey venue in Pennsylvania, after Penn State's Pegula Ice Arena.

While best known for the skating rink that is in the arena during the regular hockey season (September to March), throughout the rest of the year the ice is removed and the arena is used for other events, such as Wharton's Fight Night or Roller Derby.

The arena has hosted a variety of teams. In ice hockey, it most notably hosted the Penn varsity men's team from the arena's opening until the school dropped varsity hockey after the 1977–78 season, and has hosted the school's club-level men's and women's teams ever since. It has also hosted club hockey teams from other Philadelphia-area schools, and has hosted practices and exhibition games for the Philadelphia Flyers. In roller hockey, it has hosted the Philadelphia Bulldogs professional team. The arena also regularly hosts teams from the National Hockey League, when the teams don't have time to travel home for their regular morning skate. The arena is the home of the Philadelphia Fiesta Ice Hockey Club (a.k.a. The Saturday Morning Game), a men's travel tournament team who were the CanAm Cup (Montreal) gold medal champions in 2001, 2003 and 2005.

Prince and The Revolution performed a concert on November 24, 1982, during the "1999" tour. The opening acts included Vanity 6 and The Time.

In 2016, the arena was home to the Philadelphia Yellow Jackets of American Indoor Football. However, on May 11, 2016, the university voided their contract with the Yellow Jackets due to a lack of payment. This led to the cancellation of the Yellow Jackets' last three home games.
