= St. Pete/Winston-Salem Parrots =

- City: Winston-Salem, North Carolina; St. Petersburg, Florida
- League: Atlantic Coast Hockey League
- Founded: 2002

Franchise history
- 2002-2003: St. Pete/Winston-Salem Parrots

The St. Pete/Winston-Salem Parrots were an ice hockey team in the Atlantic Coast Hockey League in the 2002–03 season. They began the season in St. Petersburg, Florida and moved to Winston-Salem, North Carolina on November 30, 2002. They folded after the season with a record of 28-23-6.

== Season-by-season record ==
Season	GP	W	L	T	OTL	SOL	Pts	GF	GA	Place	Playoffs
2002/03	57	28	23	—	—	6	53	171	174	4., ACHL	Lost in semifinals

== Records ==
- Games: Andrew Dickson, John Gurskis 57
- Goals: Matt Holmes 22
- Assists: John Gurskis 40
- Points: John Gurkis 53
- PIM: Ken Fels 187
