= Winston-Salem IceHawks =

- City: Winston-Salem, North Carolina
- League: UHL
- Founded: 1994
- Home arena: Lawrence Joel Veterans Memorial Coliseum
- Colors: Red, yellow, black, white

Franchise history
- 1994–1997: Utica Blizzard
- 1997–1999: Winston-Salem IceHawks
- 1999–2004: Adirondack IceHawks
- 2004–2006: Adirondack Frostbite

The Winston-Salem IceHawks were a minor professional ice hockey team in the United Hockey League (UHL) based in Winston-Salem, North Carolina. The franchise was relocated from Utica, New York, in 1997 and played for two seasons in North Carolina before relocating to Glens Falls, New York, to become the Adirondack IceHawks.
