= PPL Center =

Indoor sports arena in Allentown, Pennsylvania

- PPL Center's logo as of 2018

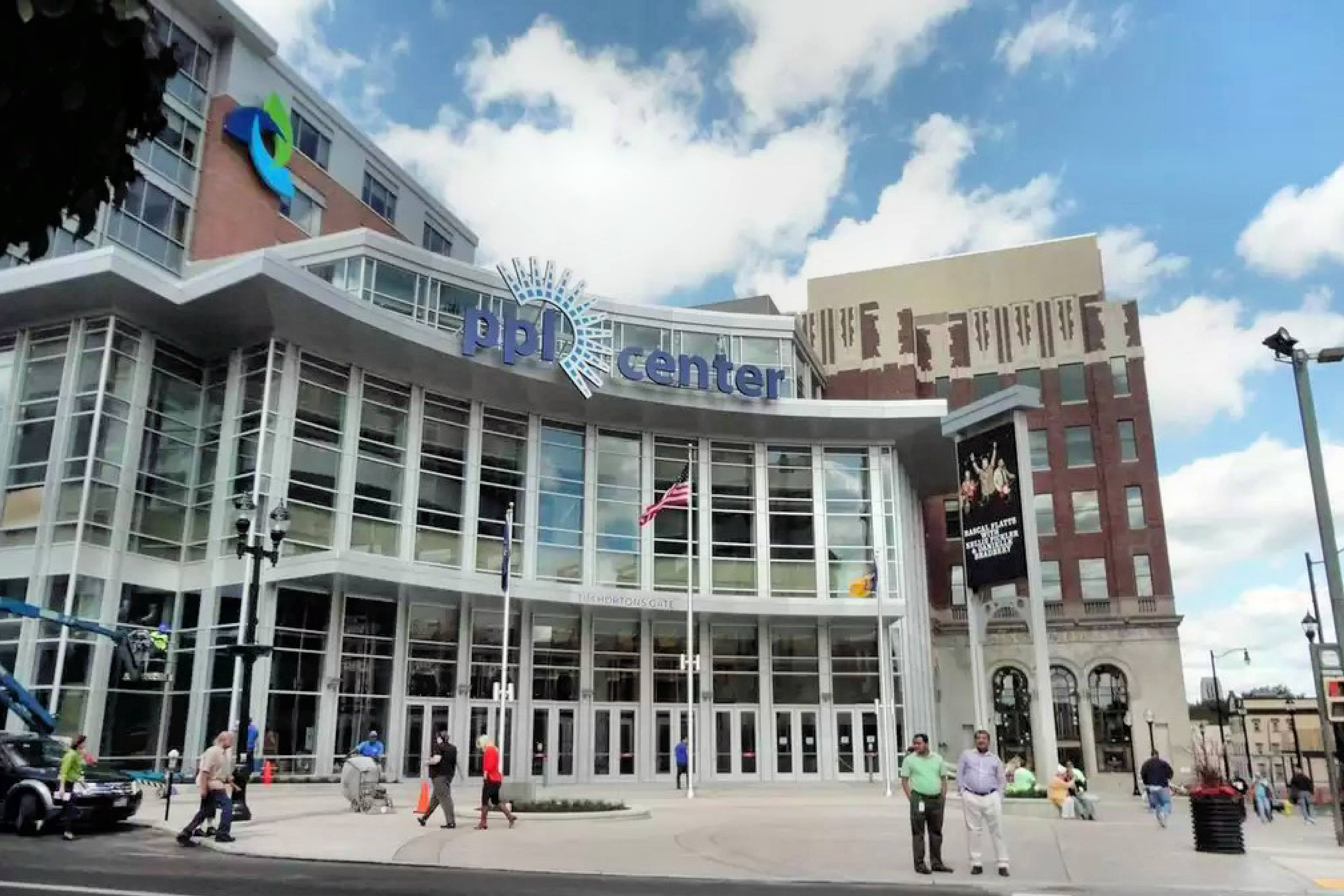
- PPL Center in 2018

- Location of PPL Center in Pennsylvania Location within the United States
- Address: 701 Hamilton Street
- Location: Allentown, Pennsylvania, U.S.
- Coordinates: 40°36′9″N 75°28′22″W
- Owner: City of Allentown
- Operator: OVG360
- Capacity: 8,420 (9,046 with standing room) (Hockey); 10,500 (Concerts); 8,500 (Indoor football)
- Surface: Multi-surface
- Public transit: LANta bus: EBS Green Line, EBS Blue Line, 102, 103, 104, 107, 209, 210, 211, 213, 218, 220, 322, 323, 324 at Allentown Transportation Center

Construction
- Groundbreaking: January 3, 2012 (site demolition); November 29, 2012 (official)
- Opened: September 10, 2014
- Cost: $191.4 million ($282 million total project)
- Architects: Sink Combs Dethlefs; Elkus Manfredi Architects
- Project managers: Hammes Company Sports Development, Inc.
- Structural engineers: Martin/Martin, Inc.
- Services engineers: M–E Engineers, Inc.
- General contractor: Alvin H. Butz Jr.

Tenants
- Lehigh Valley Phantoms (AHL) (2014–present); Lehigh Valley Steelhawks (PIFL/AIF/NAL) (2015–2018); Lehigh Valley Spirits (MASL) (2026–present)

Website
- pplcenter.com

The PPL Center is an 8,500-seat capacity indoor sports arena in Allentown, Pennsylvania. It opened on September 10, 2014. It is the home arena for the Lehigh Valley Phantoms of the American Hockey League, the primary development hockey team for the Philadelphia Flyers. The arena also hosts major concerts, sports, and entertainment events throughout the year.

== Overview ==
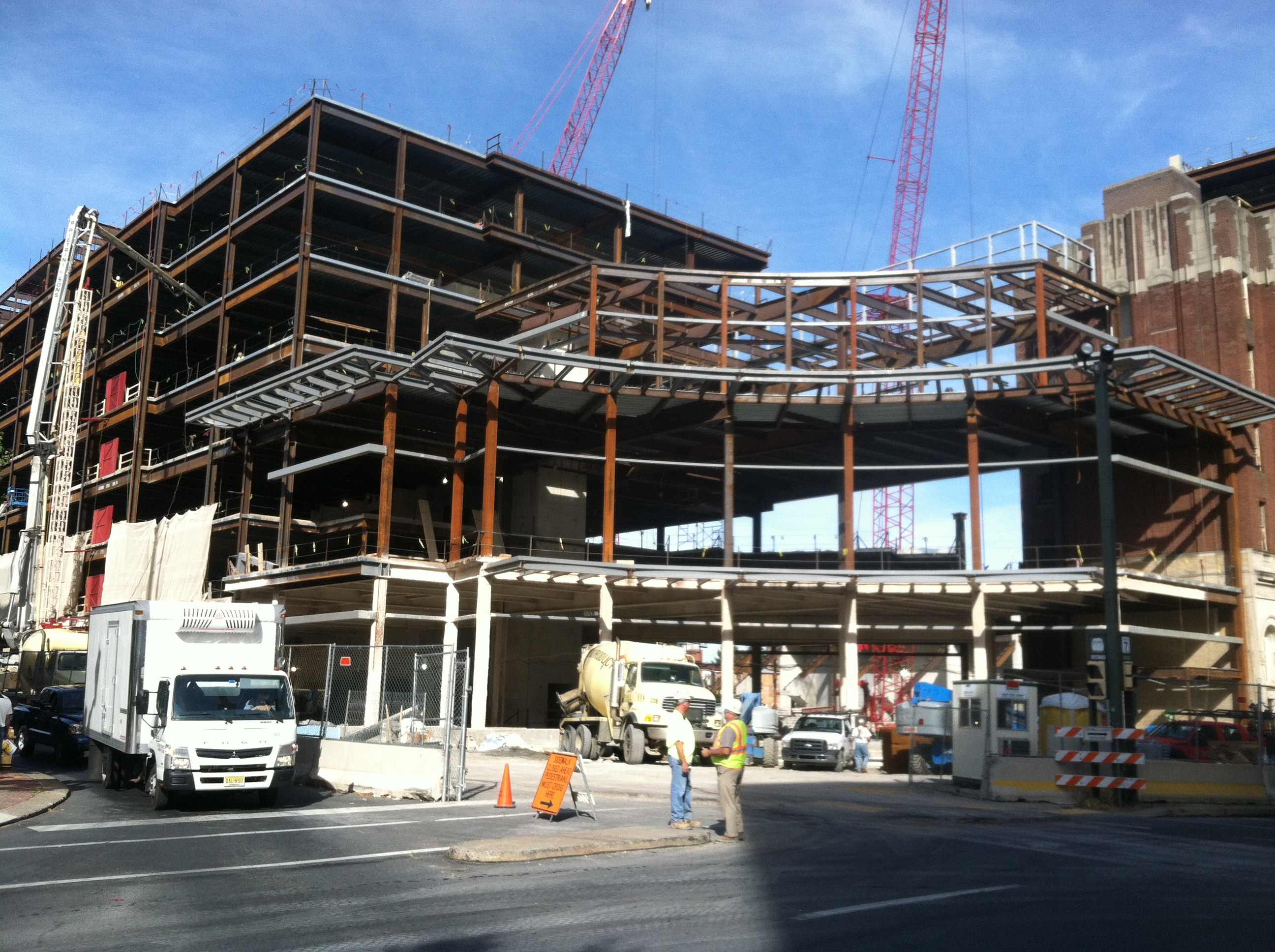
Construction of PPL Center underway in Center City Allentown in September 2013

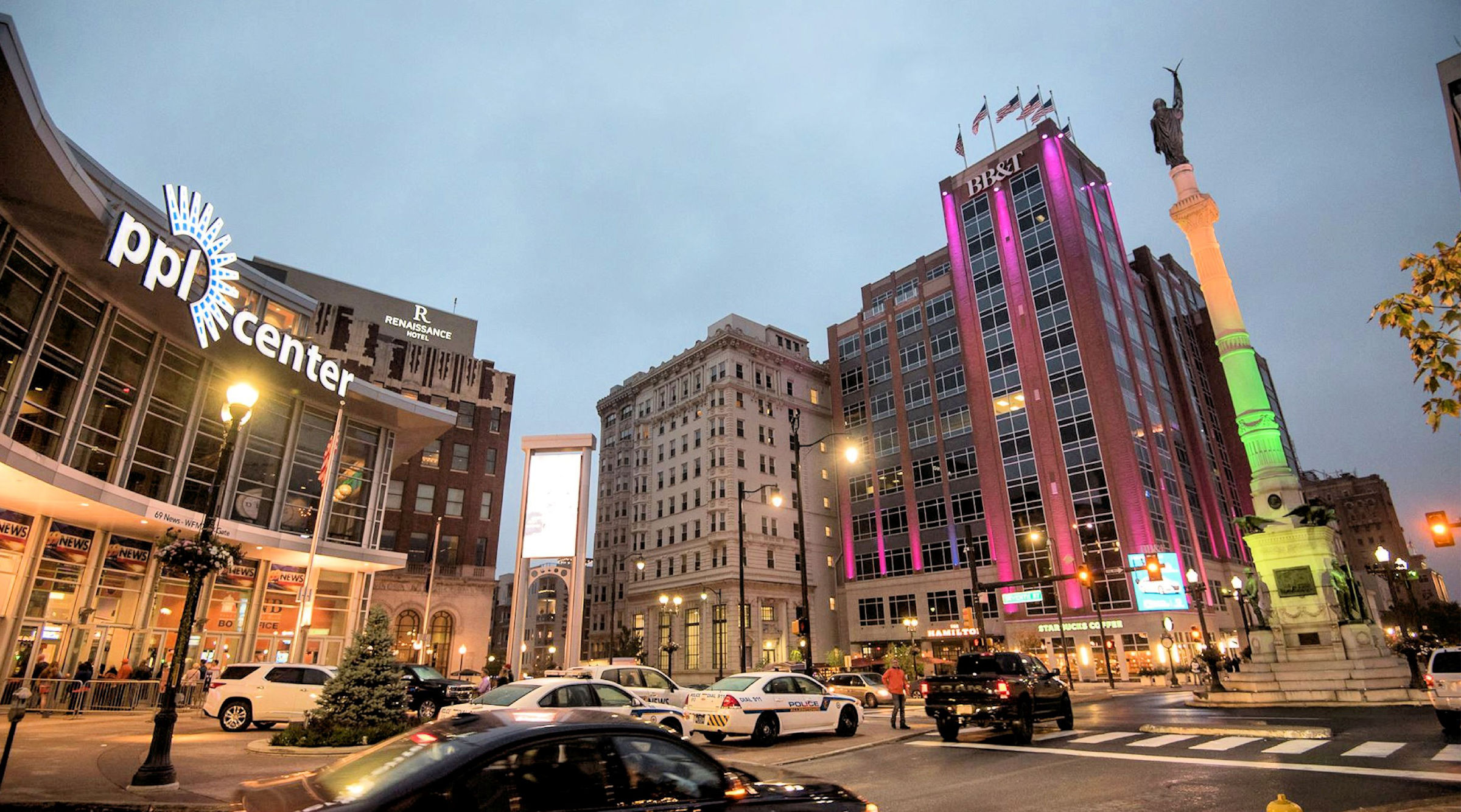
Entrance to the PPL Center (on left) in Allentown in October 2018

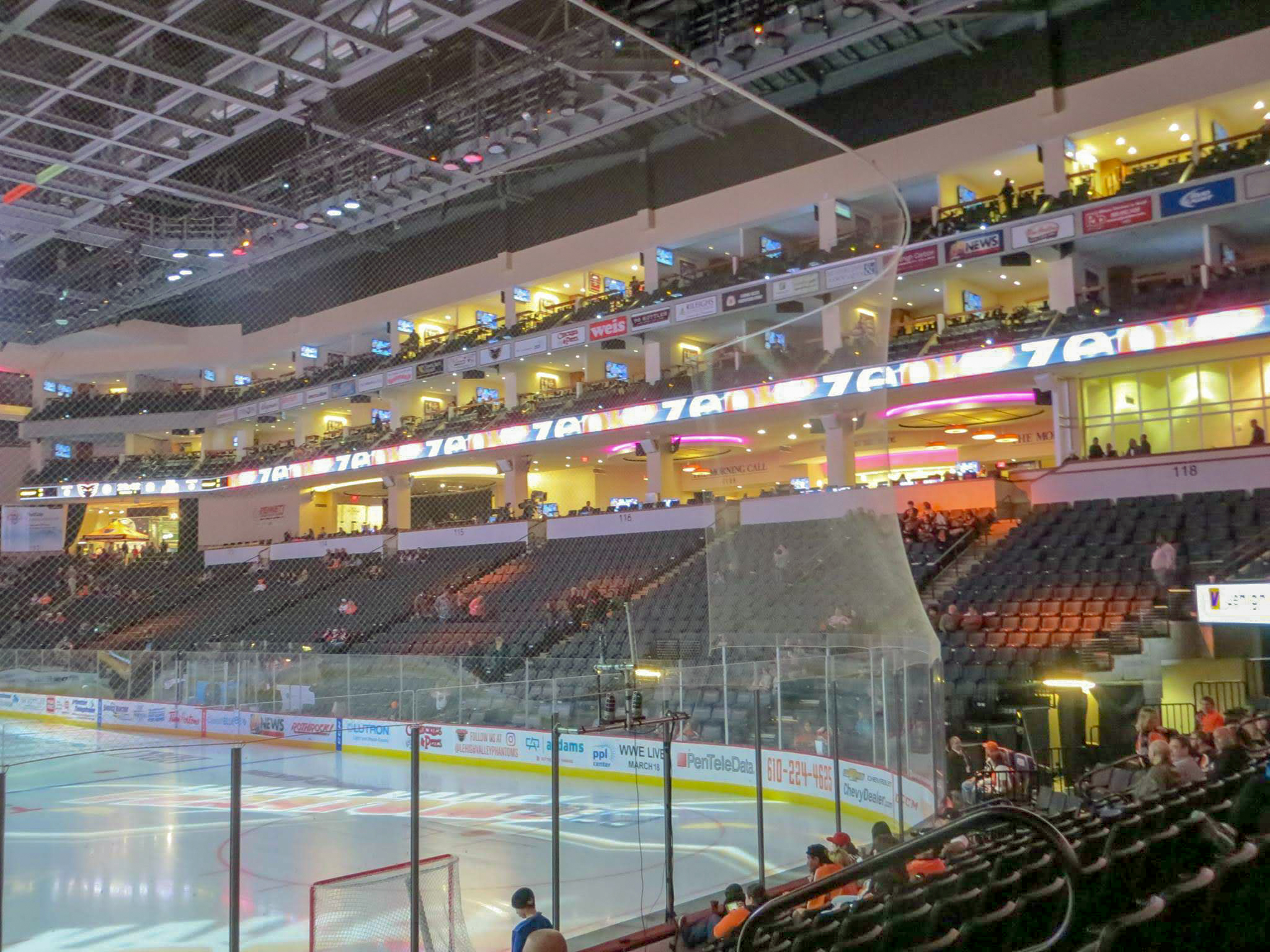
Pre-game before the Lehigh Valley Phantoms, the primary development hockey team of the Philadelphia Flyers, take the ice at PPL Center in February 2017

The arena was part of a larger redevelopment project of the central business district of Allentown. The project encompasses a five-acre square block area in which several new structures are planned to be erected: Part of the arena site was previously developed in the 1980s as an office building called Corporate Plaza. On February 23, 1994, it collapsed into a sinkhole, due to limestone in the ground and the decision to not place the building on a concrete pad, but rather on spread footings; the plaza was imploded on March 19 of that year. Within the arena on the ground floor, WFMZ-TV maintains a studio that houses its news operation.

Its naming rights are owned by the PPL Corporation, an Allentown-based company that paid an undisclosed sum over ten years for the naming rights.

Some criticism about the PPL Center centered around the cost of the arena relative to the cost of other dedicated American Hockey League arenas in the country. Nathan Benefield, the director of Public Analysis for The Commonwealth Foundation for Public Policy Alternatives, a Pennsylvania free-market think tank that opposes public funding of stadiums, believes that the PPL Center benefited from funding a plan with no cap on public money beyond the annual revenue generated by the zone. As of October 2012, $224.3 million in bonds have been sold.

== History ==
Rebuilding an arena on the site of the Spectrum in Philadelphia was rejected in favor of the more profitable Stateside Live! project and a new 180-room Renaissance by Marriott hotel. The competition to build a new arena for the Phantoms in 2008 was primarily between Allentown and Camden, New Jersey. While Camden was closer, Allentown had a more elaborate proposal which helped secure Allentown's bid for the team.

Plans to build the PPL Center at the corner of 7th and Hamilton streets in Center City Allentown were announced in late 2009. For much of 2009 and 2010, the focus of the project was on securing funding. The project took a major leap forward in 2011 when several properties were purchased by the city of Allentown to help clear the way for the project to begin. By the end of January 2012, all of the properties had been purchased with final demolition of all buildings occurring in early February 2012.

== Sports ==
The arena plays host to the Lehigh Valley Phantoms of the American Hockey League, the primary development hockey team of the Philadelphia Flyers. It had been home to the Lehigh Valley Steelhawks, an indoor football team, who played four seasons in the arena from 2015 to 2018. It also served as the site for the last remaining home games and two home playoff games for the Arena Football League's Philadelphia Soul while the Wells Fargo Center in Philadelphia was hosting the 2016 Democratic National Convention. The arena has hosted the NHL preseason game, called "Flyers in the Valley", annually since 2016.

Since 2016, the arena also hosts the Allentown Indoor Race, a midget car racing event of the Indoor Auto Racing Championship Series.

Beginning in 2028, the Ivy League announced plans to host their men’s and women’s basketball tournaments at the stadium.

== Concerts ==
Since its opening in 2014, PPL Center has hosted a number of notable concerts, including:

=== 2024 ===
- March 31: Cirque Du Soleil
- April 25: Jordan Davis
- June 8: Nate Bargatze
- June 28: Brooks & Dunn
- October 21: Duran Duran
- October 25: Godsmack
- December 2: Creed and 3 Doors Down

=== 2023 ===
- May 18: Janet Jackson and Lil' Kim
- July 6: Bill Burr
- September 21: Parker McCollum
- October 28: Cody Johnson
- November 4: Stevie Nicks
- November 7: Tool

=== 2022 ===
- February 16: Imagine Dragons
- May 15: Megadeth
- June 11 and September 30: Lynyrd Skynyrd

=== 2020 ===
- January 23: Korn and Breaking Benjamin
- February 4: Kiss and David Lee Roth

=== 2019 ===
- May 31: Meek Mill
- July 10: Rob Zombie and Marilyn Manson
- July 17: Halestorm and Alice Cooper
- December 3: Five Finger Death Punch and Three Days Grace

=== 2018 ===
- March 16: Papa Roach
- May 2: Bon Jovi
- August 3: Cyndi Lauper and Rod Stewart
- August 30: Stone Sour and Ozzy Osbourne
- September 8: Elton John

=== 2017 ===
- July 5: New Kids On The Block with Boyz II Men and Paula Abdul

=== 2016 ===
- May 17: Def Leppard
- September 27: Elton John

=== 2015 ===
- September 12: Eagles
- September 15 and 16: Tom Petty and the Heartbreakers and Steve Winwood

== Parking and traffic ==
On May 31, 2011, a comprehensive parking analysis conducted by Traffic Planning and Design, Inc. (TPD) was submitted to Allentown Economic Development Corporation. The analysis stated the total number of parking spaces within the study area, between the public and private parking garages and surface lots, was of approximately 7,376 parking spaces. As a result of this parking analysis, the existing spaces and proposed construction of an additional 500 parking spaces to be built with this development, will adequately accommodate the highest peak period parking demands of the proposed Allentown arena and mixed-used development. In comparison, Coca-Cola Park on Allentown's east side has 2,500 parking spots available.

Also on May 31, 2011, a comprehensive traffic analysis conducted by Traffic Planning and Design, Inc. (TPD) was submitted to Allentown Economic Development Corporation. The report stated that the existing roadway infrastructure can accommodate the new traffic generated by the proposed development. Conditions will be further improved with the recommended improvements.

== See also ==
- Dime Savings and Trust Company, a National Register of Historic Places building, built in 1925 and incorporated into the PPL Center
- Farr Building, a historic Allentown building, built in 1907 on the grounds of a former Continental Army hospital during the Revolutionary War
- List of indoor arenas in the United States
