= Trinity Health Arena =

Arena in Muskegon, Michigan, United States

- Location in Michigan Location in United States
- Former names: L. C. Walker Arena (1960–2019)
- Location: 470 W Western Ave, Muskegon, Michigan 49440
- Coordinates: 43°14′4″N 86°15′20″W
- Capacity: Hockey: 4,000; Basketball: 4,900; Concerts: 5,200
- Surface: Multi-surface

Construction
- Groundbreaking: 1958
- Opened: October 27, 1960
- Renovated: 2010,2016-2019,2020-2022
- Cost: $2 million ($10.9 million in 2025 dollars)
- Architect: Ralph Legeman Associates

Tenants
- Muskegon Zephyrs/Mohawks/Lumberjacks (IHL) (1960–1992); Michigan Mayhem (CBA) (2004–2006); Muskegon Thunder (CIFL) (2007–2009); Muskegon Lumberjacks (IHL) (2008–2010); Muskegon Lumberjacks (USHL) (2010–present); West Michigan Ironmen (AIF/CIF/MPIF/AAL/APFL/GLAF) (2016–present); Muskegon Risers SC (PASL/M2) (2016–2019)

The Trinity Health Arena (formerly the L.C. Walker Arena) is a 5,200-seat multi-purpose arena in Muskegon, Michigan, United States. It was built in 1960 in partnership with philanthropist and industrialist Louis Carlisle Walker at a cost of $2 million, and on October 27, 1960, was formally gifted to the City of Muskegon. Mr. Walker provided $1 million and the City provided $1 million toward the cost. It is currently home to the Muskegon Lumberjacks of the United States Hockey League, and the West Michigan Ironmen indoor football team. The Arena will change its name to Trinity Health Arena after a corporate decision to rename Mercy Health facilities Trinity Health.

The arena was built on a site of a former supermarket, and in addition to sports is also used for concerts, trade shows, conventions and other events. The arena measures 39 feet (12 m) from the arena floor to the ceiling. The arena contains 17,000 square feet (1,600 m^{2}) of arena floor space, and can seat up to 4,000 for basketball, up to 4,500 for concerts, and 3,500 for ice shows and wrestling. The Arena has gone through several renovations, with the most recent occurring in 2018. The renovation included removing seats from the arena, which once had more than 6,000 seats. The most recent renovation includes the addition of Rad Dads restaurant on the building's east side. A new sports bar and restaurant called Carlisle's has since opened on the west side of the building. Carlisle's offers high end stadium food in a sports-themed atmosphere. The name Carlisle's comes from Louis Carlisle Walker, who originally spearheaded the arena construction.

A portion of a former Plumb's grocery store, built in 1936, was actually incorporated into the Arena; it was known as the LC Walker Arena annex, used for conventions, banquets, meetings and other special events. Now, the area is used by Peak Performance, an athletic training and rehabilitation center.

== VanDyk Mortgage Convention Center ==
The VanDyk Mortgage Convention Center is a convention center which is attached to the Trinity Health Arena. The venue broke ground in May 2019 and opened on April 12, 2021.

== Louis Carlisle Walker ==
Louis Carlisle Walker (1875–1963) was a furniture maker, an 1896 graduate of the University of Michigan and founder of the Shaw-Walker company which revolutionized the office furniture industry. His success in business was matched by his generosity to the community, and the arena bore his name until 2019.
